= Tulare County Regional Transit Agency =

Transportation in California, United States

RIDE Tulare County
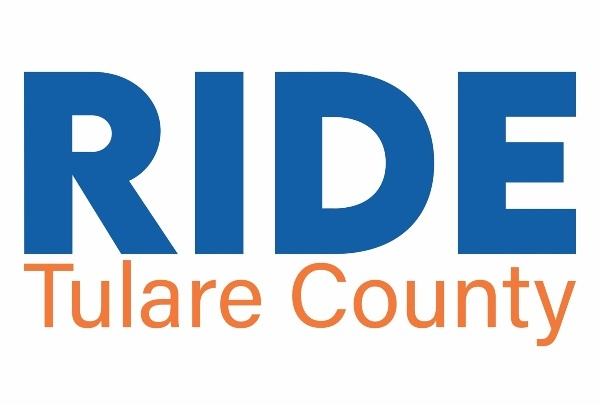
- Parent: Tulare County Association of Governments (TCAG)
- Founded: August 17, 2020
- Service area: Tulare County, California
- Service type: Bus service, Dial-a-Ride
- Routes: 27
- Destinations: Intercity and local routes in Tulare County
- Hubs: Dinuba Transit Center, Porterville Transit Center, Tulare Transit Center, Visalia Transit Center
- Website: ridetc.org

RIDE Tulare County (RIDETC) formerly known as Tulare County Regional Transit Agency, is a joint powers agency formed by all the cities in Tulare County, California (except Visalia) alongside the county government on August 17, 2020. It operates the public transportation systems within and connecting the respective member agencies, including the legacy systems Dinuba Area Regional Transit (DART, in Dinuba), Tulare InterModal Express (TIME, in the City of Tulare), and Tulare County Area Transit (TCaT, intercity routes). It is the largest single public transit agency in Tulare County.

== History ==
The cities of Exeter, Farmersville, Lindsay, Porterville, Tulare, and Woodlake in partnership with the County of Tulare were the initial seven member agencies of RIDETC, which was formed by unanimously adopting the draft by-laws on August 17, 2020. In September 2020, Dinuba joined RIDETC as the eighth member. Collectively, these represent all the cities within Tulare County with the sole exception of Visalia, the largest city and county seat, which has chosen to retain its independent Visalia Transit agency. The consolidation is expected to result in uniform fares, more efficient routes, and easier intercity travel within Tulare County.

Memoranda of understanding (MoU) were signed between RIDETC and the cities of Dinuba, Tulare, and Woodlake at the May 17, 2021 board meeting, transferring ownership, operation, and administration of public transportation systems in those cities to RIDETC. A similar MoU for Porterville signed at the same May meeting effectively allowed that city to provide transit operations and maintenance services for Woodlake. The first legacy system to transition under RIDETC administration was the bus service in Woodlake, starting on July 1, 2021. Porterville Transit loaned several minivans to Woodlake, replacing the minibuses that previously were operated by that city.

Starting late April 2026, RIDETC began a systemwide branding transition from its original TCRTA identity to the unified RIDE Tulare County name, standardizing vehicle decals, rider materials, and digital route platforms under the RIDETC abbreviation. The rebrand also expanded emphasis on real-time route information and consolidated fare messaging across member systems, aligning legacy services under a single countywide identity.

== Services ==
=== Fixed routes ===
RIDETC has assumed operation of legacy fixed routes from Dinuba (DART), Porterville (Porterville Transit), the City of Tulare (TIME), and Tulare County (TCaT). Prefixes designate the legacy system from which the route was inherited.

RIDETC Fixed Routes
Route	Name	Legacy system	Terminus	Via	Terminus	Typical headway	Notes
C10	North County	TCaT	Visalia (Visalia Transit Center)	Seville, Cutler, East Orosi, Orosi, Sultana	Dinuba (Dinuba Transit Center)	60–120 minutes	
C20	South County	TCaT	Tulare (Tulare Transit Center)	Matheny Tract, Tipton, Pixley, Teviston, Earlimart, Delano	Richgrove	60–150 minutes	
C30	Northeast County	TCaT	Visalia (Visalia Transit Center)	Ivanhoe, Woodlake, Lemon Cove, Three Rivers	Visalia (Visalia Transit Center)	30–70 minutes	Some buses turn back at Woodlake Whitney Transit Center.
C40	Southeast County	TCaT	Visalia (Tulare County Government Plaza)	Tulare, Lindsay, Strathmore	Porterville (Porterville Transit Center)	60–172 minutes	
C70	Porterville – Springville	TCaT	Porterville (Porterville Transit Center)	Springville, Highway 190 foothill corridor	Porterville (Porterville Transit Center)	90–120 minutes	Uses the same bus as C80 & C90
C80	Porterville–Terra Bella–Ducor	TCaT	Porterville (Porterville Transit Center)	Terra Bella, Ducor	Porterville (Porterville Transit Center)	90–120 minutes	Uses the same bus as C70 & C90
C90	Lindsay – Strathmore – Plainview – Woodville – Poplar – Porterville	TCaT	Lindsay	Strathmore, Plainview, Woodville, Poplar-Cotton Center, Poplar	Porterville (Porterville Transit Center)	90–120 minutes	Uses the same bus as C70 & C80
TR	Tule River Indian Reservation	PT	Porterville (Porterville Transit Center)	Highway 190 Park-n-Ride, Old Casino, Old Mill, Tule River Indian Reservation	Porterville (Porterville Transit Center)	~120 minutes	Only five scheduled trips per day
11X	Tulare–Visalia	TIME	Tulare Transit Center	State Route 99, State Route 198, Mooney Blvd corridor	Visalia (Visalia Transit Center)	30–60 minutes	Operated jointly with Visalia Transit.
DC	Dinuba Connection	DART	Dinuba Transit Center	Tulare WORKS, Reedley Shopping Center, Adventist Medical Center, Reedley College, Reedley Palm Village, Reedley DMV, Dinuba Walmart	Dinuba Transit Center	60 minutes	
DL	Dinuba Loop	N/A	Dinuba High School	Delgado Park, St. Michael’s, Saginaw & Viscaya Pkwy, Viscaya Gardens, Nebraska Dog Park, Northpark Apartments, Lincoln Elementary School, Washington Intermediate / JFK, Olive Way, Jefferson School, Rancho Vista, Wilson Elementary School	Dinuba High School	>7 hours	Limited to two scheduled trips per day
D1	Northeast Dinuba	DART	Dinuba Transit Center	Dinuba Walmart, Dollar Tree, St. Michael’s, Tulare WORKS, Parkside Village, Grace & Laughter, Saginaw & Viscaya Pkwy, Roosevelt Elementary School	Dinuba Transit Center	60 minutes	
D2	Northwest Dinuba	DART	Dinuba Transit Center	Dinuba Senior Center, Lincoln Elementary School, Nebraska Dog Park, Northpark Apartments, Sierra Village, Washington / JFK Schools, Dinuba Downs	Dinuba Transit Center	60 minutes	
D3	Southeast Dinuba	DART	Dinuba Transit Center	Olive Way, Jefferson School, Rancho Vista, Department of Public Works, Platinum Theaters, Rabobank	Dinuba Transit Center	60 minutes	
D4	Central Dinuba	DART	Dinuba Transit Center	Dinuba Walmart, Gregory Park, Housing Authority, Wilson Elementary School, Delgado Park, O Street	Dinuba Transit Center	60 minutes	
T1	North Tulare	TIME	Tulare Transit Center	Regional Medical Center, Sports Park, Pleasant School, Maple School	Tulare Transit Center	40–50 minutes	
T2	Southeast Tulare	TIME	Tulare Transit Center	Martin Luther King Jr. Ave, Bardsley Ave, Cypress Elementary School, Blackstone St corridor	Tulare Transit Center	40–60 minutes	
T3	West Tulare	TIME	Tulare Transit Center	Pleasant Ave, Valley Oak Apartments, Senior Center, Sacramento St, Pratt St	Tulare Transit Center	40–60 minutes	
T4	Northeast Tulare	TIME	Tulare Transit Center	Prosperity Ave, Target, Walmart, Tulare Outlets, Merritt Ave	Tulare Transit Center	40–60 minutes	
T5	Southwest Tulare	TIME	Tulare Transit Center	H Street, Parkwood Meadows Park, O’Neal Ave, Family HealthCare Network, Tulare City Hall	Tulare Transit Center	40–60 minutes	
T6	East Tulare	TIME	Tulare Transit Center	Tulare Ave, Laspina St, Highway 137, College of the Sequoias, Kohn Elementary School	Tulare Transit Center	40–50 minutes	Formerly designated as route T7

== Legacy systems ==
=== Dinuba ===
Under Dinuba Area Regional Transit (DART), Dinuba operated four routes, including one longer-distance route ("Dinuba Connection") connecting Dinuba to Reedley in Fresno County, two flexible routes ("North" and "South") allowing deviations to serve dial-a-ride passengers between nominal fixed route stops, and a fare-free single fixed route ("Jolly Trolley") serving popular businesses.

=== Exeter ===
The City of Exeter began operating a dial-a-ride intracity on-demand transit service in 1991. Service to its larger neighbor Visalia is provided by Visalia Transit. On July 1, 2017, Visalia Transit took over intracity dial-a-ride services within Exeter. The steep fare increase, from $1 under Exeter to $2.25 under Visalia, resulted in citizens berating the City Council.

=== Farmersville ===
The City of Farmersville also relied on Visalia Transit for public transportation connections to Visalia, with Farmersville compensating Visalia annually from its transportation funding allocation.

=== Lindsay ===
Dial-a-ride services within Lindsay were provided under annual agreements with Tulare County. TCaT also provided service for circulation within Lindsay (Route 60) and connections to Porterville and the neighboring unincorporated communities of Plainview, Poplar-Cotton Center, Strathmore, and Woodville (Route 90).

=== Porterville ===
Porterville Transit operates six fixed routes within Porterville; there were nine fixed routes prior to the COVID-19 pandemic, with one of the fixed routes providing service to the Tule River Indian Reservation. The service reopened sometime after the pandemic, now run under RIDETC administration.

=== Tulare ===
The City of Tulare operated the Tulare InterModal Express (TIME) transit service, which provided six fixed routes within Tulare and one express route, jointly operated with Visalia Transit, that connected those two cities. The six fixed routes within Tulare were named for their geographical coverage (#1 Northwest; #2 Southeast; #3 West; #4 Northeast; #5 Southwest; and #7 East); all routes, including Tulare–Visalia service (#11X) met at the central Tulare Transit Center (360 N. K St). Sunday service was added in 2015. The 7 number got switched to T6.

=== Tulare County ===
Tulare County Area Transit (TCaT) provided mainly intercity routes, linking cities and communities within Tulare County.

=== Woodlake ===
Woodlake operated a dial-a-ride service within the city limits and unincorporated areas of the county starting in 1999; fixed intercity routes serving Woodlake were previously operated by Orange Belt Stages and TCaT.

The Woodlake dial-a-ride service typically operated one of the city's three 16-passenger cutaway minibuses with the other two left in reserve. The Woodlake city bus connected with TCaT Route 30 at the Whitney Transit Center, which opened in October 2013 at 201 E Lakeview in downtown Woodlake; in total, there were four bus shelters: one at Whitney and the others at local schools (Woodlake High School, F.J. White Learning Center, and Castle Rock Elementary).

== Structure ==
Each member agency appoints one elected official and one alternate representative to serve on the RIDETC Board of Directors. RIDETC holds one meeting per month, scheduled for the third Monday at 3 PM.

== Fleet and facilities ==
=== Facilities ===
The Tulare County Transit Operations and Maintenance Facility (TOMF) held a grand opening on September 23, 2021. The TOMF can accommodate up to 25 buses with a 26,000 ft^{2} (2,400 m^{2}) building that includes administration, operations, dispatch, and maintenance facilities. It is located near the county's Visalia Road Yard, at the intersection of Avenues 256 (Sierra) and 140 (South Lover's Lane).
