= Tulare County Area Transit =

Transportation in California, United States

Tulare County Area Transit (TCaT)

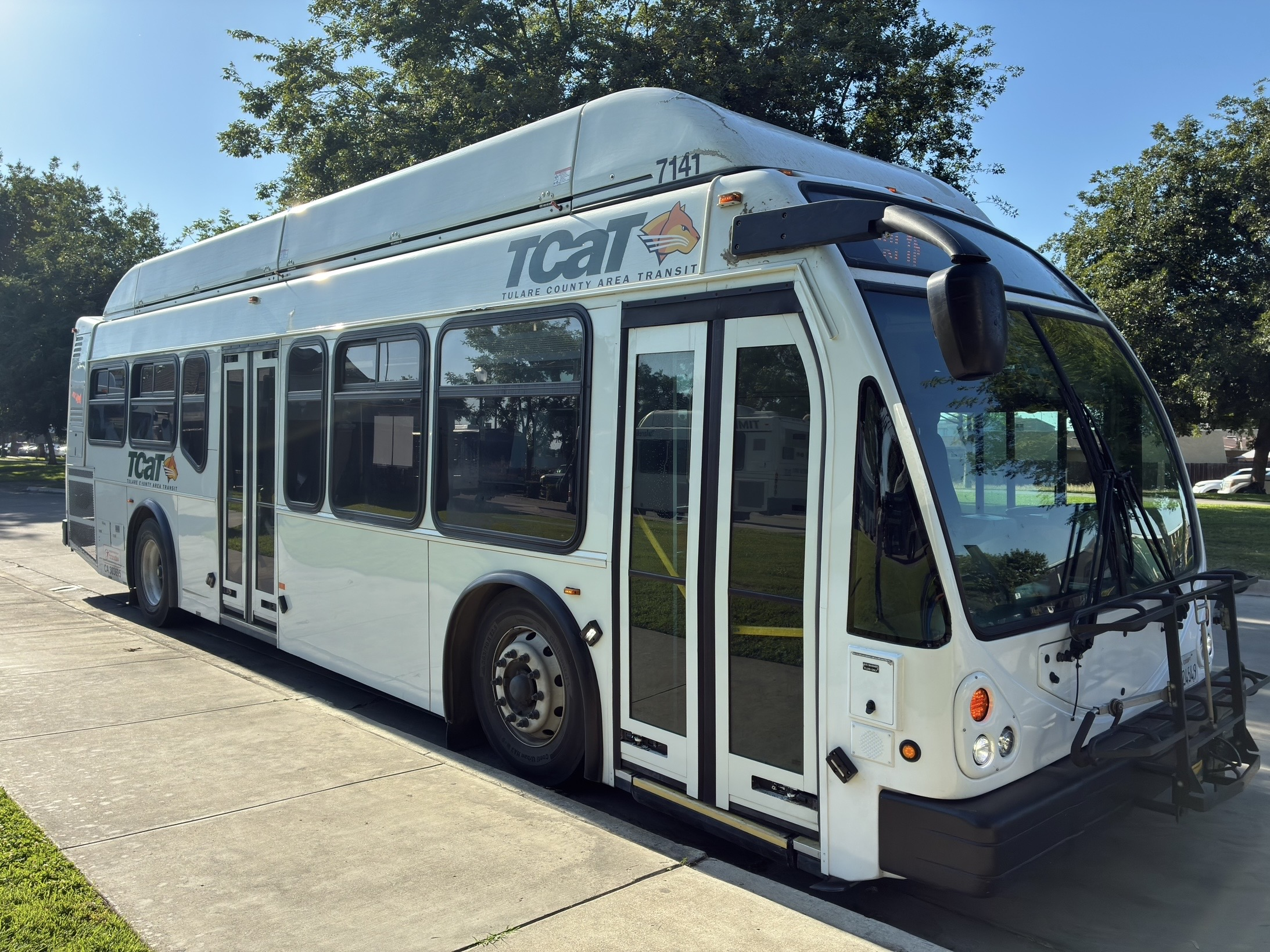
- A TCaT South County bus
- Parent: Tulare County Regional Transit Agency
- Founded: 1981 (2006)
- Headquarters: 5961 S Moony Blvd
- Locale: Visalia, CA
- Service area: Tulare County
- Service type: Bus service, Dial-a-Ride
- Routes: 9
- Destinations: Intercity routes in Tulare County
- Hubs: Porterville Transit Center, Visalia Transit Center
- Annual ridership: 231,589 (2020)
- Website: Official website

Tulare County Area Transit (TCaT) was the county-operated bus agency providing service between cities and local community circulator routes in Tulare County, California; transit within the larger cities was provided by agencies operated by those communities, including Dinuba (DART), Porterville (Porterville Transit), Tulare (TIME), and Visalia (Visalia Transit); connections are provided to Delano (DART) in neighboring Kern County.

TCaT began in 1981 with two distinct systems: rural intercity fixed routes within Tulare County and commuter routes to Visalia; the two systems were consolidated in 2000 and was rebranded to TCaT in 2006. TCaT routes are now operated by the Tulare County Regional Transit Agency (TCRTA), which was formed as a joint powers agency in 2020 by the city and county governments of Tulare County, with the exception of Visalia.

== History ==
The county began offering public transportation as COACH (rural intercity fixed routes) and STAGE (commuter service to Visalia, the county seat and largest city) in 1981 as Tulare County Transit alongside dial-a-ride point-to-point services for smaller communities in the county. COACH and STAGE were merged in fiscal year 2000–01 and Tulare County Transit was rebranded to TCaT in 2006.

MV Transportation has been the operating contractor for TCaT since 2006. Under a regional transit coordination study, it was proposed to reassign TCaT routes to municipal operators, with Visalia taking over 10, 30, and 50, and Porterville operating 40 and 70.

== Services ==
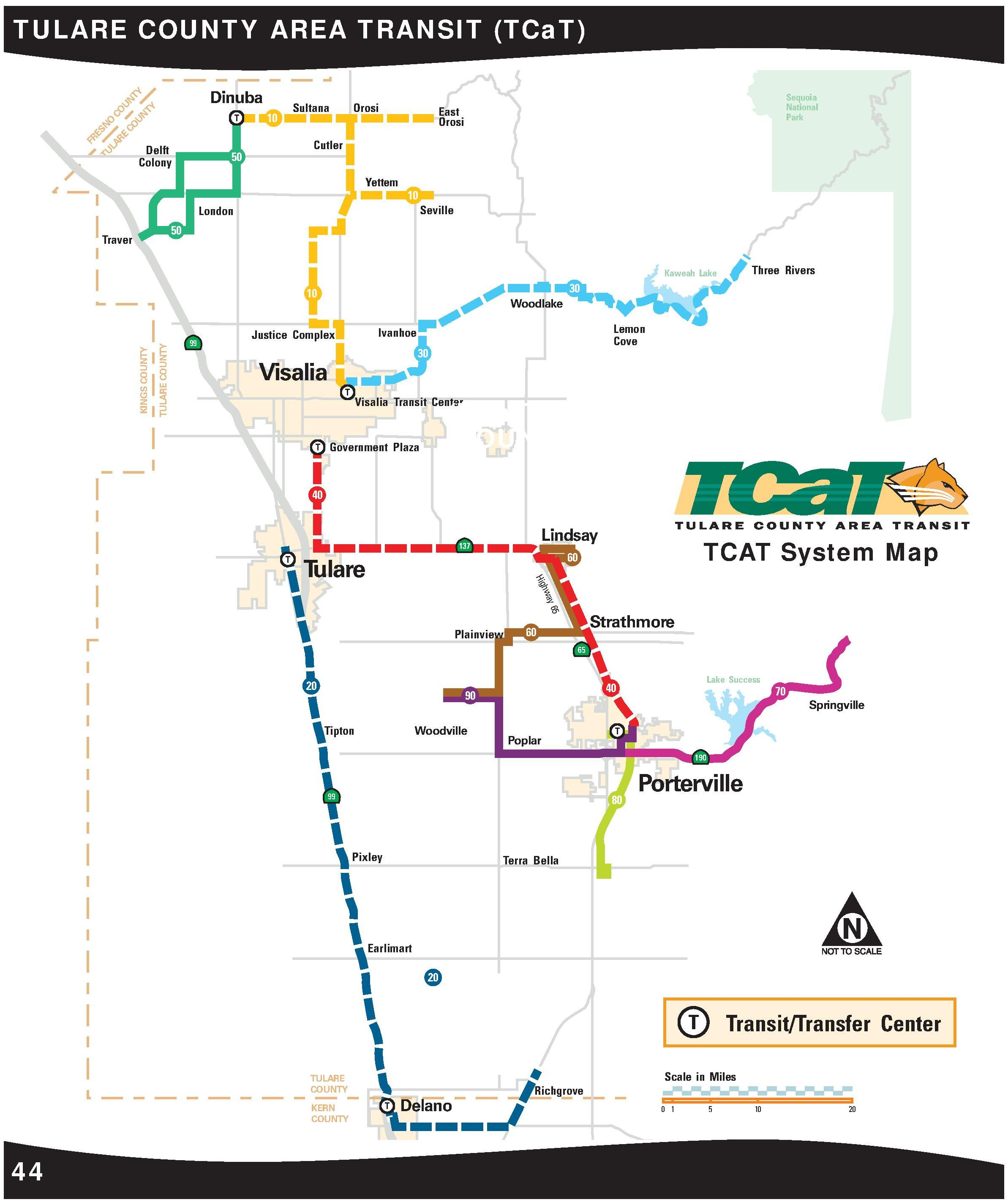
TCaT system map (c. 2016)

TCaT operates intercity routes seven days a week; most circulator routes operate on weekdays only. No service is provided on specific holidays (New Year's Day, Easter Sunday, Memorial Day, Independence Day (July 4), Labor Day, Thanksgiving Day, and Christmas Day (December 25)) and Sunday service is provided on other holidays (Martin Luther King Jr. Day, Presidents' Day, Veterans Day, Day after Thanksgiving, Christmas Eve).

=== Fixed routes ===
Fixed routes are divided into intercity (10, 20, 30, and 40) and local circulator routes (50, 60, 70, 80, and 90). Routes 70, 80, and 90 are interlined so that a single bus is used for all routes; The bus first operates from Plainview at 6:20 AM on weekdays as Route 90 and runs south to the Porterville Transit Center, arriving by 7:10 AM. Continuing as Route 90, the bus returns north to Lindsay, arriving by 7:41 AM, then turns around and heads south to Porterville via Plainview, Woodville, Cotton Center, Poplar, and Strathmore, arriving by 8:38 AM. The bus then operates as Route 70, making a loop via Springville and returning to Porterville by 9:48 AM. The bus next makes a loop as Route 80 via Terra Bella and Ducor, returning to Porterville by 10:45 AM. After an hour-long break, the bus repeats a similar cycle: first operating both directions of Route 90 twice (north to Lindsay, south back to Porterville, then repeating the north–south segments through Lindsay), then the Route 70 loop via Springville, next the Route 80 loop, and finishing with one last run as Route 90 (north to Lindsay, then south back to Porterville).

TCaT fixed routes
No.	Route name	Terminus	via	Terminus	Typ. headway (minutes)	Notes / Refs.
10	North County	Visalia	Seville, Cutler, East Orosi, Orosi, Sultana	Dinuba	60 (weekday); 120 (weekend)	
20	South County	Tulare	Matheny Tract, Tipton, Pixley, Teviston, Earlimart, Delano	Richgrove	60–90 (weekday); 150 (weekend)	
30	Northeast County	Visalia	Ivanhoe, Woodlake, Lemon Cove, Three Rivers	Visalia	30 (weekday); 70 (weekend)	
40	Southeast County	Visalia	Tulare, Lindsay, Strathmore	Porterville	65 (weekday); 120 (weekend)	
50	Dinuba – London – Traver – Delft Colony	Dinuba	London, Traver, Delft Colony	Dinuba	70–240 (wkdy); 60–180 (Sat)	
60	Lindsay	Lindsay	Savemart/McDonalds, Wellness Center, E. Tulare Rd & Lafayette Ave, City Hall	Lindsay	30 (weekday)	
70	Porterville – Springville	Porterville	Springville	Porterville	360 (weekday)	
80	Porterville – Terra Bella – Ducor	Porterville	Terra Bella, Ducor	Porterville	360 (weekday)	
90	Lindsay – Strathmore – Plainview – Woodville – Poplar – Porterville	Lindsay	Plainview, Woodville, Cotton Center, Poplar, Strathmore	Porterville	90–270 (weekday)	

=== LOOP ===
The Local Organizations Outreach Program (LOOP) provides transportation to youth mentoring and gang prevention programs at no charge for at-risk youths. LOOP started in November 2006 and operates with four buses.

=== Fares ===
Due to the ongoing COVID-19 pandemic in California, TCRTA suspended fare collection on all transit routes and participating sub-agencies, including TCaT, Tulare InterModal Express (TIME), Dinuba Transit, Porterville Transit, and Woodlake Transit starting on July 1, 2021. Partial support was provided by the San Joaquin Valley Air Pollution Control District.

Fares and passes
	Regular	Student	Military, Seniors (65+), Disabled, and Medicare	Children (6 & younger)
Single Ride	$2	$2	$1	First two free, additional $2 each
Punch Pass (Note: Valid for TCaT only.)	$17 (Note: One pass provides 10 one-way fares ($20 value).)	—	—	—
Regional T-Pass (Note: Allows riders to transfer to any fixed route or transit operator within the county.)	$55 (Note: Price for a monthly pass. Discounted mid-month pass is $30, only sold after the 16th of each month.)	—	—	—

=== Transfers ===
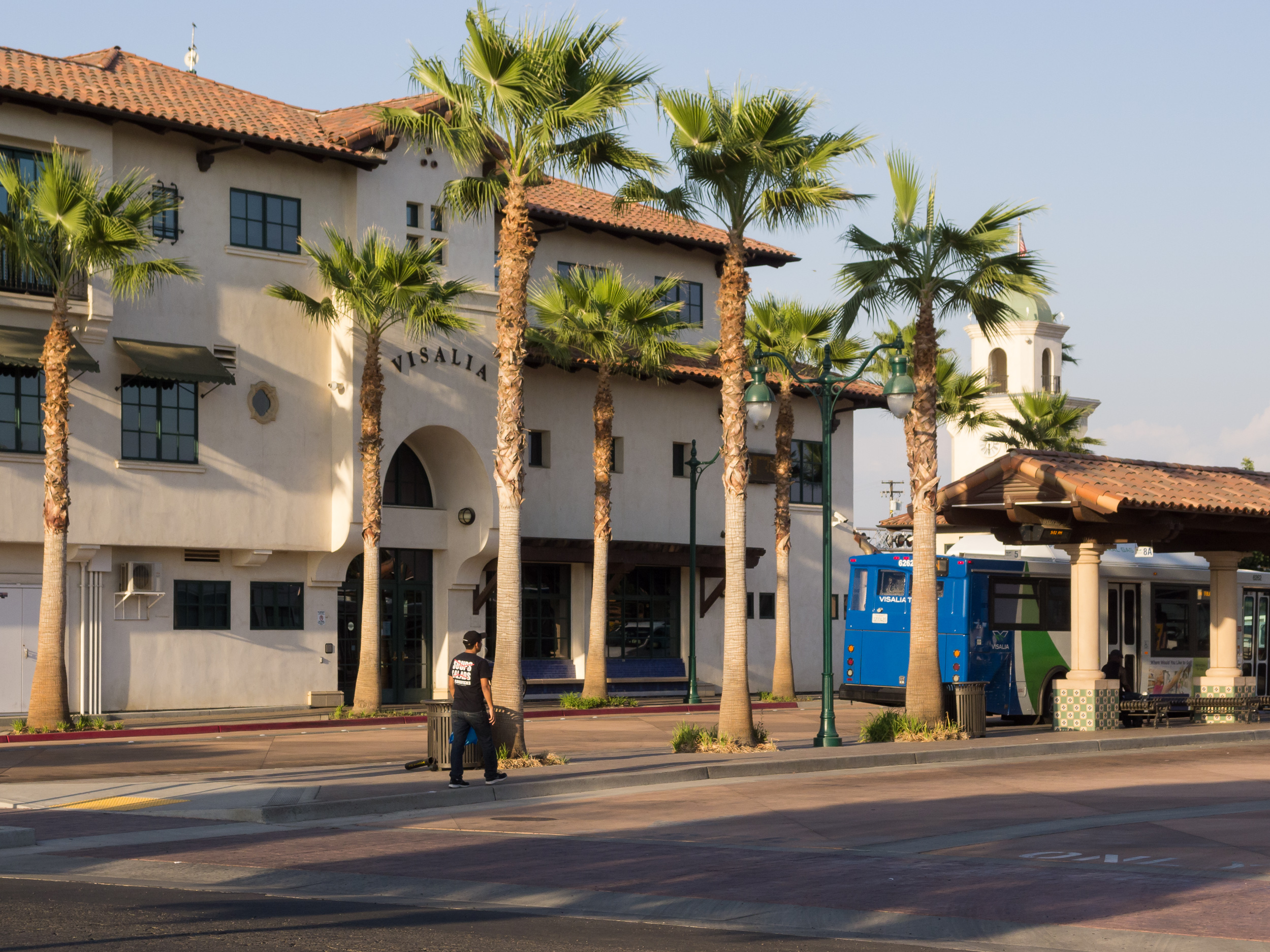
Visalia Transit Center (2013)

TCaT riders may transfer to Visalia Transit Route 1 without an additional fare. In addition, riders disembarking from the following TCaT routes may transfer to local bus systems without charge:

- to TIME (Tulare), from Routes 20 and 40
- to Porterville Transit, from Routes 40, 60, 70, 80, and 90

Within TCaT, Routes 10 and 30 connect at the Visalia Transit Center. Routes 10 and 50 connect in Dinuba. Routes 40, 60, 70, 80, and 90 connect at the Porterville Transit Center. Although it travels to Visalia, Route 40 stops at the southern edge of Visalia in Government Plaza, and does not connect to Routes 10 and 30.

== Fleet ==
Tulare County Area Transit fleet (as of 2015)
Fleet no. (Qty)	Year	Mfr	Model	Length	Fuel	Notes
? (2)	2004	ElDorado	MST II	31'	Diesel	LOOP service
? (1)	2008	ElDorado/GMC	Aerotech	?	CNG	
? (2)	2008	ElDorado/GMC	Aerotech	?	gasoline	LOOP service
? (1)	2009	ElDorado/GMC	Aerotech	?	CNG	
? (7)	2009	ElDorado/GMC	Aerotech	?	CNG	
? (4)	2011	ARBOC/GMC	Freedom?	?	CNG	
? (2)	2011	Glaval/Ford	Primetime ?		CNG	
? (4)	2013	ElDorado/Ford	Aero Elite	?	CNG	
? (2)	2014	ElDorado/Ford	Aero Elite	?	CNG	

=== Facilities ===
TCaT uses the same operations and maintenance contractor (MV Transportation) and shares a service facility with Visalia Transit at the city's Corporation Yard.
