= Porterville Transit =

Bus agency in California, United States

- Porterville Transit bus at Porterville Transit Center in October 2026
- Parent: Tulare County Regional Transit Agency
- Founded: 1997
- Headquarters: 61 W. Oak Ave
- Locale: Porterville, CA
- Service type: Bus service, Dial-a-Ride
- Routes: 6
- Destinations: Porterville; Tule River Indian Reservation
- Hubs: Porterville Transit Center
- Fleet: GreenPower Motor Company
- Annual ridership: 648,649 (2018)
- Website: Official website

Porterville Transit (PT) is the primary transit authority serving residents and visitors to Porterville, the second-largest city in Tulare County, California. It was operated by the city and offered both fixed routes and dial-a-ride local service within Porterville, with all fixed routes operating out of a central transit center. Buses connecting Porterville's transit hub to nearby census-designated places were handled by Tulare County Area Transit (TCaT), including services to Tulare and Visalia (TCaT Route 40), Springville (TCaT Route 70), Terra Bella (80), and Poplar and Woodville (90).

Prior to the COVID-19 pandemic in California, PT also offered service to the nearby Tule River Indian Reservation. Porterville Transit routes are now operated by the Tulare County Regional Transit Agency (TCRTA), which was formed as a joint powers agency in 2020 by the city and county governments of Tulare County, with the exception of Visalia.

== History ==
In 1980, the city began to offer public transportation as a dial-a-ride point-to-point service branded Dial-A-COLT (City Operated Local Transit). The city entered an agreement with TCRTA to provide public transportation services within the Porterville urbanized area in 1983, with the County providing a share of the operating budget. A locally owned company, Sierra Management, was formed in 1994 to manage the transportation service operations, including drivers, dispatchers, and administrative personnel. The city is responsible for day-to-day administration, including fleet maintenance and repair, under the Department of Public Works.

With increased demand, the city began offering two regular fixed routes as Porterville Transit starting in July 1997. Dial-A-COLT was reprioritized to focus on elderly and Americans with Disabilities Act passengers in August 2006, with regular transit taken over by Porterville Transit. In April 2020, the city began operating the transPORT service, mimicking on-demand private rideshare services like Uber and Lyft.

== Services ==
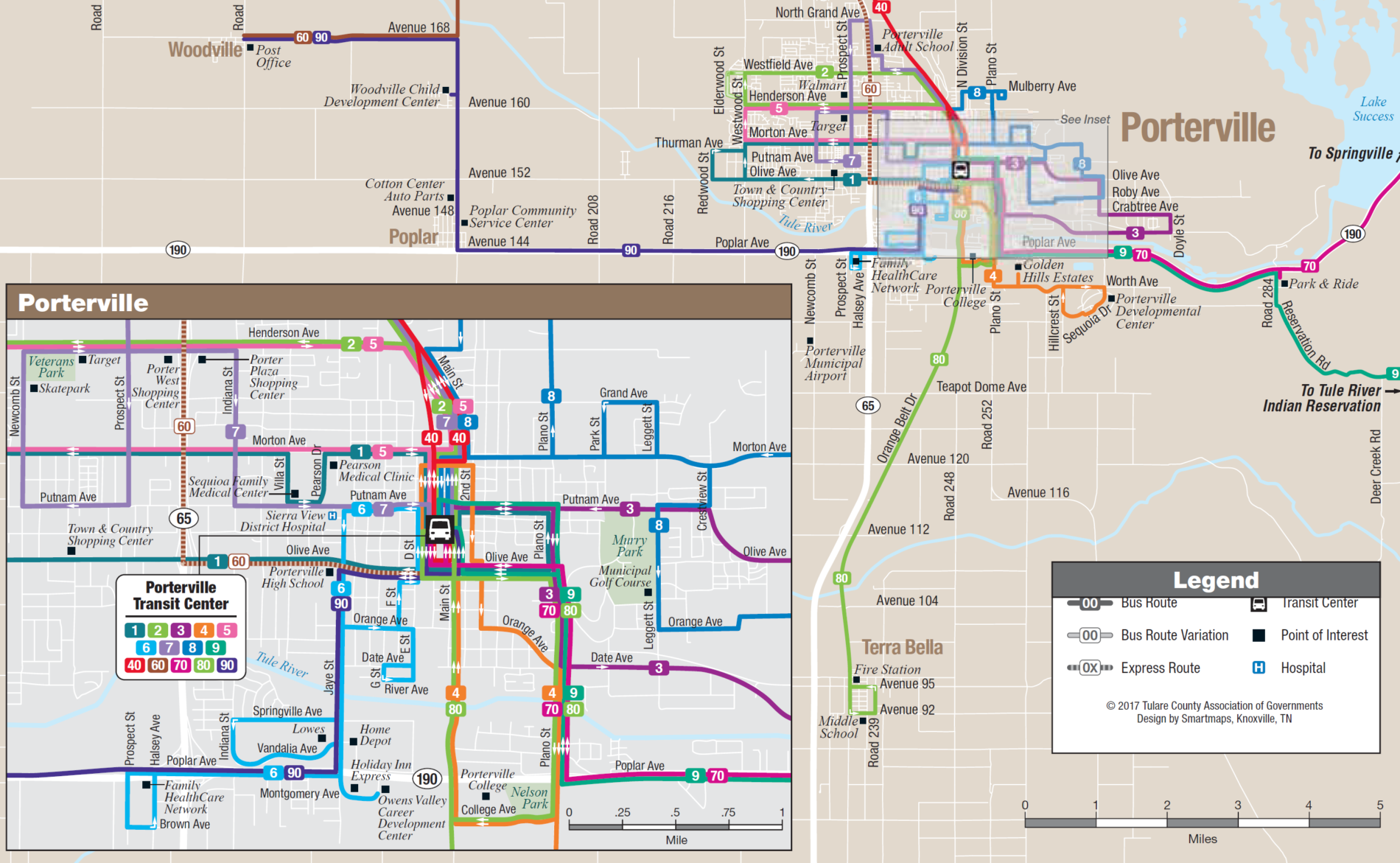
Porterville Transit map

Porterville Transit operates seven days a week, with no service provided on specific holidays (New Year's Day, July 4, Thanksgiving, and Christmas). The service area encompasses 49 mi^{2} (130 km^{2}); of the 76,000 residents, approximately 80% live within the city limits of Porterville, an area of 17.6 mi^{2} (46 km^{2}).

=== Fixed routes ===
All fixed routes originate from the Porterville Transit Center (PTC), 61 W. Oak Ave. Routes 1 through 8 are one-way loops that return to PTC; Route 9 is a linear route between PTC and the Tule River Indian Reservation. Route 9, which began service in 2013, was the most popular route by 2016, accounting for approximately 20% of all riders; Route 3 was the most frequently-boarded, averaging 17.5 boardings per revenue-hour.

Routes 4, 7, and 8 were suspended due to low ridership amid the COVID-19 pandemic in California; Route 9 was suspended at the request of the Tule River tribe. The City Council voted to resume Route 4 in August 2021.

Porterville Transit fixed routes
No.	Route name	Destinations served	Avg headway (minutes)	Notes / Refs.
1	Olive and Morton	South County Justice Center, Porterville High School, Burton Elementary, Sierra View District Hospital	40	
2	Henderson and Westfield	Porterville Library, Wal-Mart Shopping Center, Monache High School, Porterville Adult School, Monte Vista Elementary	40	
3	Plano and East Springville Dr	Vallarta Super Market, East Porterville, Alta Vista School, Granite Hills High School, Porterville Municipal Golf Course, Santa Fe Apartments	40	
4	Porterville Development Center / Porterville College	Porterville Heritage Center, Santa Fe School, LB Learning Center, Porterville Developmental Center, Golden Hills Mobile Estates, Vandalia Elementary, Pioneer Middle School, Porterville College	40	
5	Morton and Henderson	Veterans Park, Westwood Ave, Target Shopping Center, Government Plaza, Galaxy 9 Theaters, Zalud Park	40	
6	Family HealthCare Network / Eastridge Shopping Mall	Sierra View District Hospital, Lowes and Home Depot Shopping Center, Family HealthCare Network, Holiday Inn Express, Porterville Sheltered Workshop	40	
7	Porterville Adult School	North Main St., Monte Vista Elementary, Porterville Adult School, Sequoia Middle School, Wal-Mart Shopping Center, West Putnam Elementary, Porterville Skate Park, Target Shopping Center, Government Plaza, and Galaxy 9 Theaters	80	Suspended. Archived routes and schedules available.
8	Northeast Porterville	Roche Ave Elementary, Porterville Municipal Golf Course, John J. Doyle Elementary, Granite Hills High School	80	Suspended. Archived routes and schedules available.
9	Tule River Indian Reservation	Vallarta Super Market, Eagle Mtn Casino Park n Ride, Tule River Tribal Offices, Eagle Mountain Casino, South County Justice Center	60	Suspended. Archived routes and schedules available.

=== Fares ===
Due to the ongoing COVID-19 pandemic in California, TCRTA suspended fare collection on all transit routes and participating sub-agencies, including Tulare County Area Transit (TCaT), Tulare InterModal Express (TIME), Dinuba Transit, Porterville Transit, and Woodlake Transit starting on July 1, 2021. Partial support was provided by the San Joaquin Valley Air Pollution Control District.

Prior to the suspension of fares, exact change was required. Porterville Transit also offers a contactless "GO Card" (smart card and onboard farebox; passengers may pre-purchase single-trip fares; 1-, 7-, or 31-day passes; or preload the card with cash. Alternatively, passengers may pay using the agency's mobile app, which will display a QR code to be scanned by the onboard farebox.

Fares and passes
	Regular	Student	Veterans, Seniors (65+), Disabled, and Medicare	Children (5 & younger)
Single Ride	$1.50	$1.50	$0.75	First two free, additional $1.50 each
All-Day Pass	$3	$3	$1.50	—
7-Day Pass	$10	—	—	—
Monthly Pass	$40	$25	$20	—
Regional T-Pass (Note: Allows riders to transfer to any fixed route within the county.)	$55 (Note: Price for a monthly pass. Discounted mid-month pass is $30, only sold after the 16th of each month.)	—	—	—

=== Transfers ===
Bus services connecting Porterville with other communities within Tulare County are provided by Tulare County Area Transit (branded TCaT). TCaT riders on Routes 40, 60, 70, 80, and 90 may transfer to Porterville Transit buses for free.

== Fleet ==
In August 2021, the transit fleet included 10 battery-electric buses, 14 CNG transit buses, 12 battery-electric vans, 3 CNG cutaway buses, and 9 gasoline minivans.

Porterville Transit fleet (fixed routes, as of 2016)
Fleet no. (Qty)	Year	Mfr	Model	Length	Fuel	Notes
8159, 8162 (2)	2003	ElDorado/Freightliner	MST II	31'	Diesel	
8100 (1)	2005	SVMC	Classic Trolley	25'	Gasoline	
8168–8171 (4)	2007	ElDorado	E-Z Rider II MAX	32'	CNG	
8175–8179 (5)	2010	ElDorado	E-Z Rider II MAX	32'	CNG	
8184 (1)	2009	Starcraft	AllStar	25'	Gasoline	
8190–8191 (2)	2013	ElDorado	E-Z Rider II MAX	32'	CNG	
8192–8193 (2)	2015	ElDorado	E-Z Rider II MAX	32'	CNG	
8201–8210 (10)	2018	GreenPower	EV350	35'	battery-electric	
? (4)	2021	GreenPower	EV350	35'	battery-electric	Planned procurement

=== Facilities ===
The Transit Center, which opened in May 2003, also houses the bus dispatch center and ticket office. Bus maintenance, fueling, and storage are performed at the City of Porterville Department of Public Works, Field Services Division facility on North Prospect Street, between W Grand Ave and W Morton Ave.
