= Transportation in Visalia =

Intercity transportation system in California, U.S.

Overview
- Owner: Visalia Transit, Caltrans, and the state of California
- Locale: The City of Visalia and surrounding cities in Tulare County
- Transit type: buses, private automobile, airplane, taxicab, bicycle, pedestrian

Operation
- Operators: Visalia Transit, Tulare County Area Transit (TCAT), Sequoia Shuttle, The Loop, Dial-A-Ride, Visalia Towne Trolley, Amtrak, and private operators

The intercity transportation system in Visalia serves as a regional hub for passenger and freight traffic in the Sequoia Valley, composed of freeways, roads, and bus lines.

== Air transportation ==
In the Visalia metropolitan area there is one commercial airport and many general-aviation airports.

The primary Visalia airport is Visalia Municipal Airport.

Other nearby commercial airports include: Fresno Yosemite International Airport (serves the San Joaquin Valley) and Meadows Field Airport (serves the South Valley).

Some general-aviation airports include: Sequoia Field, Exeter Airport, Woodlake Airport, Porterville Municipal Airport, and Mefford Field.

== Land transportation ==
The City of Visalia is served by a network of freeways, streets, and local and regional public transportation systems.

=== Freeways ===
Freeways of Visalia include:

- Golden State Highway
- Sequoia Freeway

Highways of Visalia include:

- South Mooney Boulevard and Dinuba Boulevard
- Lovers Lane

=== Public transportation ===
- Visalia Transit
- Tulare County Area Transit (TCaT)
- Tulare Intermodal Express (TIME)- Route 11X - Daily service between the downtowns of Tulare and Visalia in partnership with both cities.
- Kings Area Regional Transit (KART) - Route 15 - Weekly service between the city of Hanford and Downtown Visalia.
- Sequoia Shuttle - Summer service between Visalia and Sequoia National Park.
