= TCAT (disambiguation) =

TCAT or Tompkins Consolidated Area Transit is a transportation operator serving the region around Ithaca and Tompkins County, New York.

TCAT may also refer to:

- Cyclo-Methiodrone (TCAT), a designer drug of the thiophene class
- Tokyo City Air Terminal (T-CAT), a bus terminal serving both Haneda and Narita airports near Tokyo, Japan
- Tulare County Area Transit (TCaT), serving intercity routes in Tulare County, California
- Telford College of Arts and Technology (TCAT), a further education college in Telford, Shropshire, England
- Tennessee Colleges of Applied Technology (TCAT), a public college system with 27 campuses located throughout Tennessee.
