= Porterville Unified School District =

School district in California

Address
- 600 West Grand Avenue Porterville, California, 93257; United States

District information
- Type: Public
- Grades: K–12
- Established: 1998; 28 years ago
- Superintendent: Nate NelsonEd.D
- Budget: $69.7M
- NCES District ID: 0600064

Students and staff
- Students: 14,372 (2020–2021)
- Teachers: 599.49 (FTE)
- Staff: 639.64 (FTE)
- Student–teacher ratio: 23.97:1

Other information
- Website: www.portervilleschools.org

Porterville Unified School District (PUSD) is a school district located in Porterville, Tulare County, California, United States, and is composed of ten elementary schools, four middle schools, six comprehensive high schools, a continuation school, large adult school, and two alternative program sites. The high schools are accredited and provide academic programs that prepare students for university entrance. Other programs include music, art, agriculture, athletics, and vocational preparation.

The following places are covered by PUSD for all grade levels, K-12: most of Porterville, western East Porterville, and Kennedy Meadows. Portions of the district covers only high school levels. Those portions include part of Porterville as well as the rest of East Porterville, California Hot Springs, Camp Nelson, Cedar Slope, Ducor, Idlewild, McClenney Tract, Pierpoint, Pine Flat, Plainview, Ponderosa, Poplar-Cotton Center, Posey, Poso Park, Sequoia Crest, Springville, Strathmore, Sugarloaf Saw Mill, Sugarloaf Village, Terra Bella, Woodville, and Woodville Farm Labor Camp.

== History ==
In 1896 Porterville High School was set up in the east room of the second story of the Morton Street Elementary School. The school was financially supported with tuition from students coming from outside the Porterville School area. Porterville High School was renamed to Porterville Union High School in 1910. In 1924 Porterville Elementary District was consolidated, adding Worth Elementary School. Vandalia Elementary School joined the Porterville Elementary District in 1925. Miles Elementary School was added to the Porterville Elementary District in 1932. On June 15, 1928, a two-classroom addition was added to the Porterville Union High School for use as a junior college. The addition of a junior College did not change the extent of the district but admitted junior college students from Strathmore, Lindsay, Exeter, and Tulare high schools. This was paid for by the county, and the overhead costs for the students were chargeable to the districts.

In 1998 Porterville Unified School District was created by unifying the Porterville Elementary District (est.1862) and Porterville Union High School (est.1869). Strathmore High School District was merged into the Porterville Unified School District in 2004.

== Schools ==
=== Elementary schools ===
- Belleview Elementary School
- John J. Doyle Elementary School
- Los Robles Elementary School
- Monte Vista Elementary School
- Olive Street Elementary School
- Roche Avenue Elementary School
- Santa Fe Elementary School
- Vandalia Elementary School
- Westfield Elementary School
- West Putnam Elementary School

=== Middle schools ===
- Barlett Middle School
- Pioneer Middle School
- Porterville Military Academy
- Sequoia Middle School

=== High schools ===
- Granite Hills High School
- Harmony Magnet Academy
- Monache High School
- Porterville High School
- Porterville Military Academy
- Strathmore High School

=== Continuation schools ===
- Citrus High School

=== Alternative program sites ===
- Vine Community Day School
- Butterfield Charter School

=== Large adult schools ===
- Porterville Adult School
