= Woodlake Whitney Transit Center =

Transit center in Woodlake, California

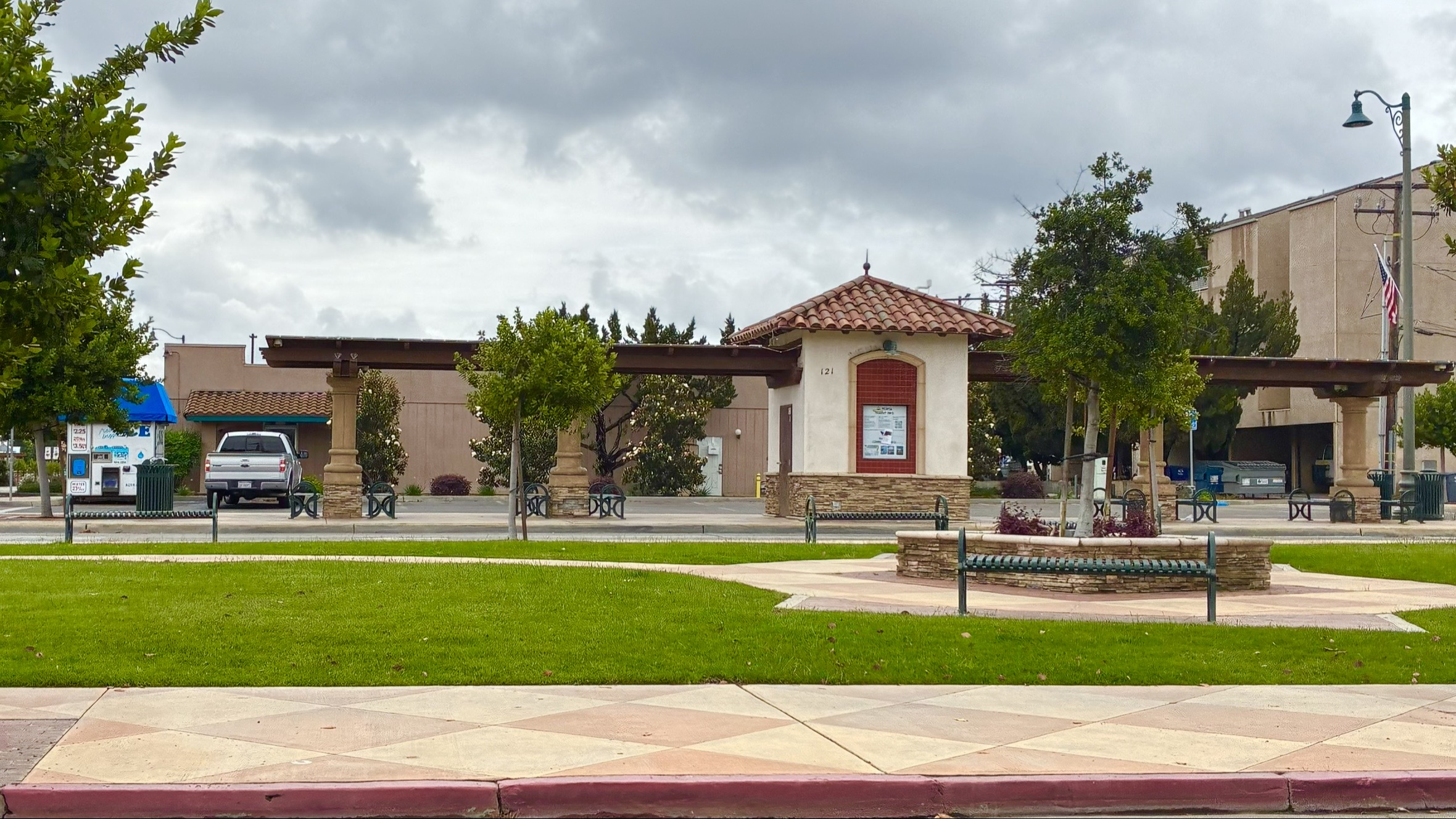

General information
- Location: 201 E. Lakeview Avenue; Woodlake, California; United States
- Coordinates: 36.41715°N 119.09783°W
- Owner: City of Woodlake
- Operator: City of Woodlake
- Transit authority: Tulare County Regional Transit Agency
- Bus routes: C30
- Bus operators: Tulare County Regional Transit Agency
- Connections: TCRTA microtransit service

Construction
- Structure type: At-grade
- Accessible: Yes

Other information
- Website: gotcrta.org/services-and-schedules/transit-center-locations/
Location

Woodlake Whitney Transit Center is a transit center in Woodlake, California, located at 201 East Lakeview Avenue. It is operated by the City of Woodlake and served by the Tulare County Regional Transit Agency (TCRTA).

== History ==
The Woodlake Whitney Transit Center was completed by the City of Woodlake as part of local transportation improvements and later became a stop for county transit operations.

The transit center is maintained by the City of Woodlake for regional transit use.

== Services ==
The following route serves the transit center:

- C30 – Woodlake, Lemon Cove, and the Visalia Transit Center

TCRTA Microtransit service is also available from the transit center.

== See also ==
- Tulare County Regional Transit Agency
- Visalia Transit Center
- Woodlake, California
