= Dinuba Area Regional Transit =

Former transit system in California

- A City of Dinuba DART Bus in Tulare
- Parent: City of Dinuba
- Ceased operation: 2021
- Headquarters: Dinuba Transit Center, 180 W. Merced Street, Dinuba, California
- Locale: Dinuba, California
- Service area: Dinuba, California; Reedley, California; Tulare County, California; Fresno County, California
- Service type: Bus service, demand-responsive transport
- Routes: 4
- Operator: City of Dinuba

Dinuba Area Regional Transit (DART) was the City of Dinuba's municipal transit system in Dinuba, California. At its peak, the system included a flex route network that combined fixed-route and dial-a-ride service, the free Jolly Trolley circulator, and the Dinuba Connection regional route to Reedley, California.

Transit service in Dinuba is now provided through RIDE Tulare County.

== History ==
A 2019 City of Dinuba request for proposals described DART as a city-operated system and stated that flex route service had been introduced in 2007. DART is a combination of flex route, dial-a-ride, and regional fixed-route service in Dinuba and the surrounding area.

The 2014 transit development plan made DART as the City of Dinuba's public transit system and identified three core elements: the flex route system, the Jolly Trolley circulator, and regional service to Reedley.

In June 2021, a service agreement between TCRTA, now known as RIDETC and the Fresno County Rural Transit Agency covered Dinuba-Reedley intercity service beginning July 1, 2021. The City of Dinuba's current transit page now directs riders to RIDETC, an lists Dinuba among the cities it serves.

== Services ==
DART's flexroute service used two 30-minute routes through northern and southern Dinuba. The Dinuba Transit Center served as the transfer point between routes, and the service allowed buses to deviate from the route to pick up dial-a-ride passengers between stops. All DART buses were wheelchair accessible, and dial-a-ride trips had to be reserved in advance.

The Jolly Trolley was a free circulator serving major shopping destinations in central Dinuba. It operated Monday through Thursday from 9:00 a.m. to 6:00 p.m. and Friday and Saturday from 9:00 a.m. to 9:00 p.m.

The Dinuba Connection linked Dinuba with Reedley and served the Dinuba Vocational Center, Adventist Medical Center, Reedley College, Palm Village Retirement Community, and Walmart. It operated Monday through Friday, with separate school-year and summer schedules.

== Routes ==
All DART routes began and ended at the Dinuba Transit Center.

Dinuba Area Regional Transit routes
Route	Route name	Terminus	Via	Terminus	Headway
1	Northern Dinuba	Dinuba Transit Center	Senior Center; Tulare Works; Walmart	Dinuba Transit Center	30 minutes (weekday); 60 minutes (Friday evening to Saturday)
2	Southern Dinuba	Dinuba Transit Center	Housing Authority; shopping and neighborhood stops in southern Dinuba	Dinuba Transit Center	30 minutes (weekday); 60 minutes (Friday evening to Saturday)
Jolly Trolley	Jolly Trolley	Dinuba Transit Center	Walmart; Kmart; Entertainment Plaza	Dinuba Transit Center	30 minutes (free service)
Dinuba Connection	Dinuba Connection	Dinuba Transit Center	Dinuba Vocational Center; Adventist Medical Center; Reedley College; Palm Village; Walmart	Reedley	1 hour

Map of the Dinuba Area Regional Transit system before consolidation into TCRTA

== Fares ==
According to the system's published guide, fixed-route fare was $0.25 for riders age 6 and older, while children 5 and under rode free with a fare-paying adult. The monthly T-Pass cost $50.00 and provided unlimited fixed-route rides. Dial-a-Ride fare was $1.50 for the general public, $1.25 for seniors and students, and free for children 5 and under with a fare-paying adult. The Dinuba Connection charged $1.50 one-way. The Jolly Trolley was free.

== Transition to RIDE Tulare County ==
By 2021, Dinuba transit service had transitioned to then TCRTA rather than continuing as a standalone city system. The City of Dinuba's public transit page now redirects to RIDE Tulare County, it describes itself as the agency serving Dinuba along with other Tulare County cities and the county government.

== See also ==
- RIDE Tulare County
- Tulare County Area Transit
