= Tulare Transit Center =

Transit center in Tulare, California

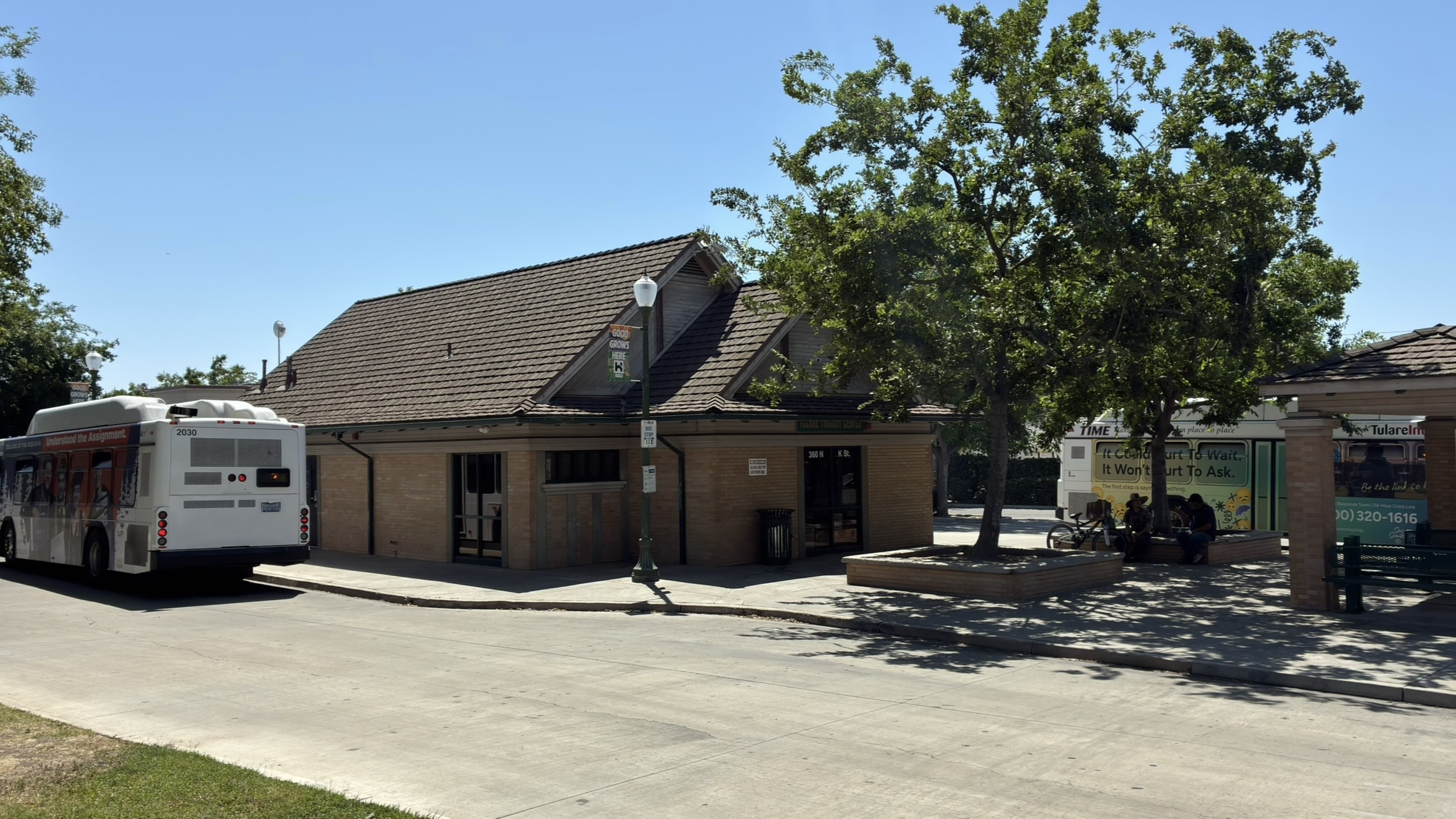
- The Transit Center viewed from the NW side

General information
- Location: 360 N K Street; Tulare, California; United States
- Coordinates: 36.21183°N 119.34629°W
- Owner: Tulare County Regional Transit Agency
- Operator: Tulare County Regional Transit Agency (TCRTA)
- Transit authority: Tulare County Regional Transit Agency
- Bus routes: T1, T2, T3, T4, T5, T6, 11X
- Bus operators: Tulare County Regional Transit Agency
- Connections: TCRTA microtransit service

Construction
- Structure type: At-grade
- Accessible: Yes

Other information
- Website: ridetc.org/services-and-schedules/transit-center-locations/
Location

Tulare Transit Center is a public transportation facility in downtown Tulare, California, United States. Located at 360 North K Street, the center serves as a transit hub for local Tulare routes and regional commuter services operated by the Tulare County Regional Transit Agency (TCRTA), which operates under the name RIDE Tulare County.

The original downtown transit center was constructed in 1999 to facilitate connections between bus services. An additional intermodal transit facility opened directly across from it in 2007 as part of a downtown redevelopment strategy.

The Tulare Transit Center functions as a primary transfer location for Tulare fixed-route operations. The facility provides local and regional transit connections throughout Tulare County. The center provides connections between routes serving Tulare and surrounding communities, including Visalia, Tipton, Pixley, Earlimart, and Delano.

== History ==
=== Development ===
The Tulare Downtown Transit Center was constructed in 1999 to improve connections between intercity public transportation services. Before its construction, buses used an on-street transfer location. The transit center provides a waiting area for passengers, access to bathrooms for bus drivers and passengers, and a break room for drivers, among other amenities for safety and convenience.

According to the Tulare County Association of Governments' 2011 Regional Transportation Plan, the downtown transit center was served by Tulare InterModal Express (TIME), Tulare County Area Transit (TCaT), and Visalia City Coach (VCC). These services provided local transportation within Tulare and connections to other communities in Tulare County.

In 2007, the City of Tulare opened the Tulare InterModal Transit Center directly across from the existing downtown transit center. The new facility formed part of a broader downtown redevelopment strategy that included the continued development of public transportation services.

=== Regional transit consolidation ===
The Tulare County Regional Transit Agency was established through a joint powers agreement that became effective on August 17, 2020. Its founding members included the cities of Dinuba, Exeter, Farmersville, Lindsay, Tulare, and Woodlake, as well as Tulare County.

== Location and facilities ==
The transit center is located at 360 North K Street in downtown Tulare, California. The Tulare County Regional Transit Agency identifies the facility as one of its transit center locations, alongside facilities in Dinuba and Woodlake.

The center provides a location for passengers to board buses, transfer between services, and purchase transit passes. The regional transit agency also identifies its transit centers as points for connections between local and regional transportation services.

The facility is situated near the Tulare stop used by Greyhound Lines, which is listed separately at 407 North K Street.

== Bus services ==
The Tulare Transit Center serves local bus routes operating within Tulare and regional routes connecting the city with other communities in the southern San Joaquin Valley.

The following routes serve the transit center:

- T1 North Tulare – via Regional Medical Center, Vallarta Supermarket, Sports Park, Pleasant Elementary School, and Maple School.
- T2 Southeast Tulare – via Tulare Fairgrounds, Cypress Elementary School, Valley Oak Apartments, and Senior Center.
- T3 West Tulare – via Centennial Park and Tulare Historical Museum.
- T4 Northeast Tulare – via Target, Walmart, and Tulare Outlets.
- T5 Southwest Tulare – via Family HealthCare Network, Parkwood Meadows Park, and Tulare City Hall.
- T6 East Tulare – via College of the Sequoias, Mission Oak High School, and Kohn Elementary School.
- 11X – via Tulare and Visalia.

TCRTA microtransit service is also available from the transit center.

=== Local services ===
Local bus services connect the transit center with residential neighborhoods, commercial areas, educational institutions, and other destinations within Tulare.

The East Tulare Loop, designated Route T6, operates from the transit center and serves destinations including Tulare Avenue, Laspina Street, Highway 137 and Mooney Boulevard, the College of the Sequoias Tulare campus, and Kohn Elementary School before returning to the transit center.

The published Monday–Saturday timetable for the East Tulare Loop provides departures from the transit center beginning at 7:00 a.m., with the final listed departure at 7:00 p.m. The scheduled journey around the loop takes approximately 35 minutes.

=== Regional services ===
The Tulare–Visalia Express, designated Route 11X, connects the Tulare Transit Center with the Visalia Transit Center. The route provides an intercity connection between the two cities, including service along the Mooney Boulevard corridor in Visalia.

The South County Route, designated C20, connects Tulare with communities farther south in Tulare County and with Delano in neighboring Kern County. Its published timetable identifies the Tulare Transit Center as a scheduled stop and includes service to Matheny Tract, Tipton, Pixley, Teviston, Earlimart, and Delano.

== Passenger activity ==
A December 2025 Tulare County Regional Transit Agency report included an analysis of passenger boarding and alighting activity at transit stops throughout the regional system. The report identified eight routes serving the transit center during the sampling period: 11X, C20, T1, T2, T3, T4, T5, and T6. The figures represent passenger activity recorded in the sampled trips rather than annual ridership totals for the transit center.

The analysis used sampled trips from March 2025 through August 2025. Tulare Transit Center recorded 238 passenger boardings and alightings in the sample, compared with 136 at Visalia Transit Center, 88 at Porterville Transit Center, and 84 at Dinuba Transit Center.

== See also ==
- Tulare County Regional Transit Agency
- Tulare, California
