= Sierra View District Hospital =

Sierra View Medical Center
- Sierra View Local Healthcare District

Geography
- Location: Porterville, San Joaquin Valley, California, United States
- Coordinates: 36.06913°N 119.02737°W

Organization
- Care system: Healthcare District
- Type: District Hospital
- Affiliated university: None

Services
- Standards: Joint Commission Accreditation
- Beds: 163

History
- Founded: 1958; 68 years ago

Links
- Website: www.sierra-view.com
- Lists: Hospitals in California

Sierra View Medical Center is a 167-bed, full-service acute care hospital located in Porterville, California. Founded in 1958, the hospital serves the Southern Sequoia region of California's Central Valley. Services include cancer care, an intensive-care unit and respiratory care.

The hospital is a part of the Sierra View Local Healthcare District. It offers a wide range of health care services featuring state of the art technologies including Magnetic Resonance Imaging (MRI) and Computed Tomography (CT). The hospital is also home to the Roger S. Good Cancer Treatment Center, which hosts clinical trials of the University of California Los Angeles in oncology. In July 2007, the hospital opened a 32-station outpatient Dialysis Center. The hospital's Wound Healing Center is managed by Healogics.

Sierra View Medical Center was awarded the Joint Commission's Gold Seal of Approval for Primary Stroke Centers in 2021, demonstrating compliance with high standards in quality improvement for patient outcomes. The hospital also received the organization's Pioneers in Quality award in 2017. Sierra View Medical Center received the Get With The Guidelines - Stroke GOLD PLUS with Target: Type 2 Diabetes Honor Roll from the American Heart Association. It is also the only hospital in Tulare County to be designated "Baby Friendly" following a World Health Organization and UNICEF-supported initiative aimed at promoting breastfeeding. The Wound Healing Center was awarded the Healogics Robert A. Warriner III Center of Excellence in 2018.
