= Monache High School =

Location
- 960 North Newcomb St. Porterville, California; USA; 36.08325°N 119.0528°W

Information
- School type: Public, High School
- Established: 1967
- School district: Porterville Unified School District
- Superintendent: Nate Nelson
- Principal: Shondra Walker
- Staff: 90.08 (FTE)
- Grades: 9-12
- Enrollment: 1,934 (2023-2024)
- Student to teacher ratio: 21.47
- Colors: Blue and Gold
- Mascot: Marauder
- Newspaper: The Tribal Tribune

Monache High School is one of the three high schools located in Porterville, California, United States and is part of the Porterville Unified School District (PUSD). It's the city's second high school and as of 2021 serves approximately 2,583 students.

== Arts ==
There is a mural of a Native American as of 2024. It The mural has three parts, a Native American man’s upper torso — eyes closed, arms extended, bow and arrow strapped across his chest — at the top, a centered giant “M” with a feathered arrow intersecting the letter, and the word “Respect” — followed by the words “Show respect to all people but grovel to none — Tecumseh” written across the bottom third.

=== Music ===
The Monache High School Marching Band has performed around the world, such as Edinburgh, Scotland, the Aloha Bowl, the Hollywood Christmas Parade, The Rose Parade, The Macy's Thanksgiving Day Parade, The Orange Bowl Parade, and The Fiesta Bowl. The band has won the title of Grand Champions at the Selma Marching Band Festival 27 times. In 2006, the group won the Centennial Band Review and was named Grand Champion of the Chick-Fil-A Bowl Band festival, winning three of the festival's four events: jazz band, field show and parade. They did not compete in the Concert Band competition.

== Mathematics ==
Current courses include: Prealgebra, Math 2P, Math 3P, Statistics, Trigonometry, Precalculus P and Calculus AB/BC.
