= Granite Hills High School (Porterville, California) =

High school in Porterville, California, United States

Location
- 1701 E Putnam Ave., Porterville, CA 93257
- Coordinates: 36.0684°N 118.9786°W

Information
- School district: Porterville Unified School District
- Principal: Jacob Bowker
- Staff: 55.22 (FTE)
- Enrollment: 1,168 (2023–2024)
- Student to teacher ratio: 21.15
- Colors: Cardinal and silver
- Nickname: Grizzlies

Granite Hills High School, established in 1999, is one of the eleven high schools in Porterville, Tulare County, California. Jacob Bowker is the principal. A previous principal was Apolinar Marroquin.

Its online newspaper, the Grizzly Gazette, was a top million finalist in the National Scholastic Press Association Pacemaker Competition in the 2005–06 school year and were winners the following two years.----

The Granite Hills Academic Decathlon team won the Tulare County Academic Decathlon Regional Championship for the 6th consecutive year.

The school's girls soccer team forfeited a game in 2022 because of the other team included a transgender athlete.

The school offers an "Academy of Law Justice and Ethics" program. In 2022, students from the school's Academy of Law Justice and Ethics investigated a simulated murder scene

In 2018, a student stabbed himself.
