= Tulare InterModal Express =

- A TIME Bus in its original paint scheme
- Parent: Tulare County Regional Transit Agency
- Ceased operation: 2021
- Headquarters: Tulare, California
- Locale: Tulare County, California
- Service area: Tulare, California
- Service type: Bus service
- Routes: 7
- Destinations: Tulare, California
- Operator: City of Tulare
- Website: https://www.tulare.ca.gov/residents/transit

The Tulare InterModal Express (TIME) was a public transportation system serving the city of Tulare, California and surrounding areas in Tulare County, California. It had provided fixed-route bus service and demand-response transit (Dial-A-Ride), connecting residential neighborhoods, commercial centers, and regional destinations.

Originally operated by the City of Tulare, TIME is now part of RIDE Tulare County as part of a broader effort to unify transit services across the county.

== History ==
TIME was established to provide local bus service within Tulare, offering residents an alternative to private vehicle travel. Over time, the system expanded to include multiple routes covering different parts of the city, as well as regional connections.

In 2021, operations were consolidated into RIDE Tulare County, following the creation of a joint powers authority to manage transit across multiple cities in Tulare County.

== Services ==
=== Fixed-route service ===
TIME operates several fixed bus routes throughout Tulare. These routes are designed to connect key areas of the city and typically converge at a central hub:

Historically, TIME operated six local routes and one express route connecting to Visalia, California.

A key regional route includes:

- Route 11X (Tulare–Visalia Express), providing service between Tulare and Visalia.

=== Dial-A-Ride ===
TIME operates a Dial-A-Ride service within Tulare city limits. This curb-to-curb service is available to the general public, with priority often given to seniors and individuals with disabilities.

== Service area and operations ==
- Service area: Tulare city limits
- Operating hours:
  - Monday–Friday: Approximately 6:15 a.m. to 9:45 p.m.
  - Saturday–Sunday: Reduced hours
- Holiday service: Not operated on major holidays such as Christmas and Independence Day.

== Routes and connectivity ==
TIME routes are structured to allow transfers at the Tulare Transit Center, enabling riders to move between routes efficiently.

Former TIME routes (pre-TCRTA)
Route	Route name	Terminus	Via	Terminus	Headway
1	North Tulare	Tulare Transit Center	Tulare Regional Medical Center; Sports Park; Pleasant School; Maple School	Tulare Transit Center	About every 30 minutes weekdays/Saturdays; hourly Sundays
2	Southeast Tulare	Tulare Transit Center	Martin Luther King Jr. Ave & O St.; Bardsley Ave & Mooney Blvd.; Blackstone St & Bardsley Ave	Tulare Transit Center	About every 30 minutes weekdays/Saturdays; hourly Sundays
3	West Tulare	Tulare Transit Center	Westside Community Health Clinic; Senior Center; Skate Park	Tulare Transit Center	About every 30 minutes weekdays/Saturdays; hourly Sundays
4	Northeast Tulare	Tulare Transit Center	Prosperity Ave; Target; Walmart; Vallarta	Tulare Transit Center	About every 30 minutes weekdays/Saturdays; hourly Sundays
5	Southwest Tulare	Tulare Transit Center	Bardsley Ave & Pratt St.; K St & Goodin Ave; Hillman Clinic; Tulare Aviation Department	Tulare Transit Center	About every 30 minutes weekdays/Saturdays; hourly Sundays
7	East Tulare	Tulare Transit Center	Mooney Blvd; College of the Sequoias (Tulare); Kohn School	Tulare Transit Center	About every 30 minutes weekdays/Saturdays; hourly Sundays
11X	Tulare–Visalia Express	Tulare Transit Center	Mooney Blvd; Mineral King Ave	Visalia Transit Center (Visalia, California)	About every 30 minutes (express service)

TIME Bus Service Map

The system connects with regional transit providers including Tulare County Area Transit via Tulare Transit Center and Visalia Transit via the 11X, allowing for extended travel across Tulare County.

== Administration ==
TIME is now operated since 2021 under RIDE Tulare County, a joint powers agency formed by multiple cities and the County of Tulare to coordinate regional transit services.

== Planning and reports ==
Transit planning and performance for TIME have been evaluated through regional audits and reports conducted by the Tulare County Association of Governments.

== See also ==
- Tulare County Regional Transit Agency
- Tulare County Area Transit
- Visalia Transit
- Public transport in the United States
