= Seville, California =

Seville
- census-designated place
- Location in Tulare County and the state of California

- Location within California Location within the United States
- Coordinates: 36°30′57″N 119°13′23″W
- Country: United States
- State: California
- County: Tulare

Area
  - Total: 0.275 sq mi (0.712 km^{2})
  - Land: 0.275 sq mi (0.712 km^{2})
  - Water: 0 sq mi (0 km^{2}) 0%
- Elevation: 354 ft (108 m)

Population (2020)
  - Total: 446
  - Density: 1,620/sq mi (626/km^{2})
- Time zone: UTC-8 (Pacific (PST))
  - Summer (DST): UTC-7 (PDT)
- ZIP code: 93292
- Area code: 559
- GNIS feature IDs: 249325; 2585448

Seville is a census-designated place in Tulare County, California, United States. Seville is located along California State Route 201 4.5 miles (7.2 km) southeast of Cutler and 8.5 miles (13.7 km). northwest of Woodlake. The population was 446 at the 2020 census.

== History ==
Seville was named by officials of the Atchison, Topeka and Santa Fe Railroad in 1913. The first child born in Seville was Dorothy Seville Wilhour on December 21, 1914. The town gave her father a $20 gold piece for naming the child after the town.

A post office was established in Seville in 1915 and was closed in 1931

== Geography ==
According to the United States Census Bureau, the CDP covers an area of 0.3 square mile (0.7 km^{2}), all land.

== Water system ==
In March 2011, Catarina de Albuquerque of the United Nations visited Seville to evaluate the community's water system. She was appointed by the UN's Human Rights Council in 2008 as the first UN Independent Expert on human rights obligations with respect to access to safe drinking water and sanitation. She said that many families in Tulare County spend more than 10 percent of their income on tap and bottled water because the tap water is contaminated with nitrates from agricultural fertilizers, septic systems and dairy farms. De Albuquerque added that this expense cuts into their ability to pay for other essential needs such as "food, housing, education and health." In Seville in 1911, many residents were spending more than $120 per month on water while the average annual household income was only $16,000.

== Demographics ==
Historical population
| Census | Pop. | Note | %± |
|---|---|---|---|
| 2010 | 480 | | — |
| 2020 | 446 | | −7.1% |
U.S. Decennial Census; 1850–1870 1880-1890; 1900 1910 1920; 1930 1940 1950; 1960 1970 1980; 1990 2000 2010

Seville first appeared as a census designated place in the 2010 U.S. census.

The 2020 United States census reported that Seville had a population of 446. The population density was 1,621.8 inhabitants per square mile (626.2/km^{2}). The racial makeup of Seville was 81 (18.2%) White, 0 (0.0%) African American, 27 (6.1%) Native American, 1 (0.2%) Asian, 0 (0.0%) Pacific Islander, 208 (46.6%) from other races, and 129 (28.9%) from two or more races. Hispanic or Latino of any race were 419 persons (93.9%).

The whole population lived in households. There were 99 households, out of which 50 (50.5%) had children under the age of 18 living in them, 51 (51.5%) were married-couple households, 8 (8.1%) were cohabiting couple households, 20 (20.2%) had a female householder with no partner present, and 20 (20.2%) had a male householder with no partner present. 17 households (17.2%) were one person, and 4 (4.0%) were one person aged 65 or older. The average household size was 4.51. There were 77 families (77.8% of all households).

The age distribution was 147 people (33.0%) under the age of 18, 54 people (12.1%) aged 18 to 24, 126 people (28.3%) aged 25 to 44, 81 people (18.2%) aged 45 to 64, and 38 people (8.5%) who were 65 years of age or older. The median age was 27.1 years. For every 100 females, there were 98.2 males.

There were 105 housing units at an average density of 381.8 units per square mile (147.4 units/km^{2}), of which 99 (94.3%) were occupied. Of these, 47 (47.5%) were owner-occupied, and 52 (52.5%) were occupied by renters.

== Education ==
Seville is served by the Stone Corral Elementary School District and the Woodlake Unified School District for grades 9–12.
