= Visalia Transit =

Bus services provider in California, United States

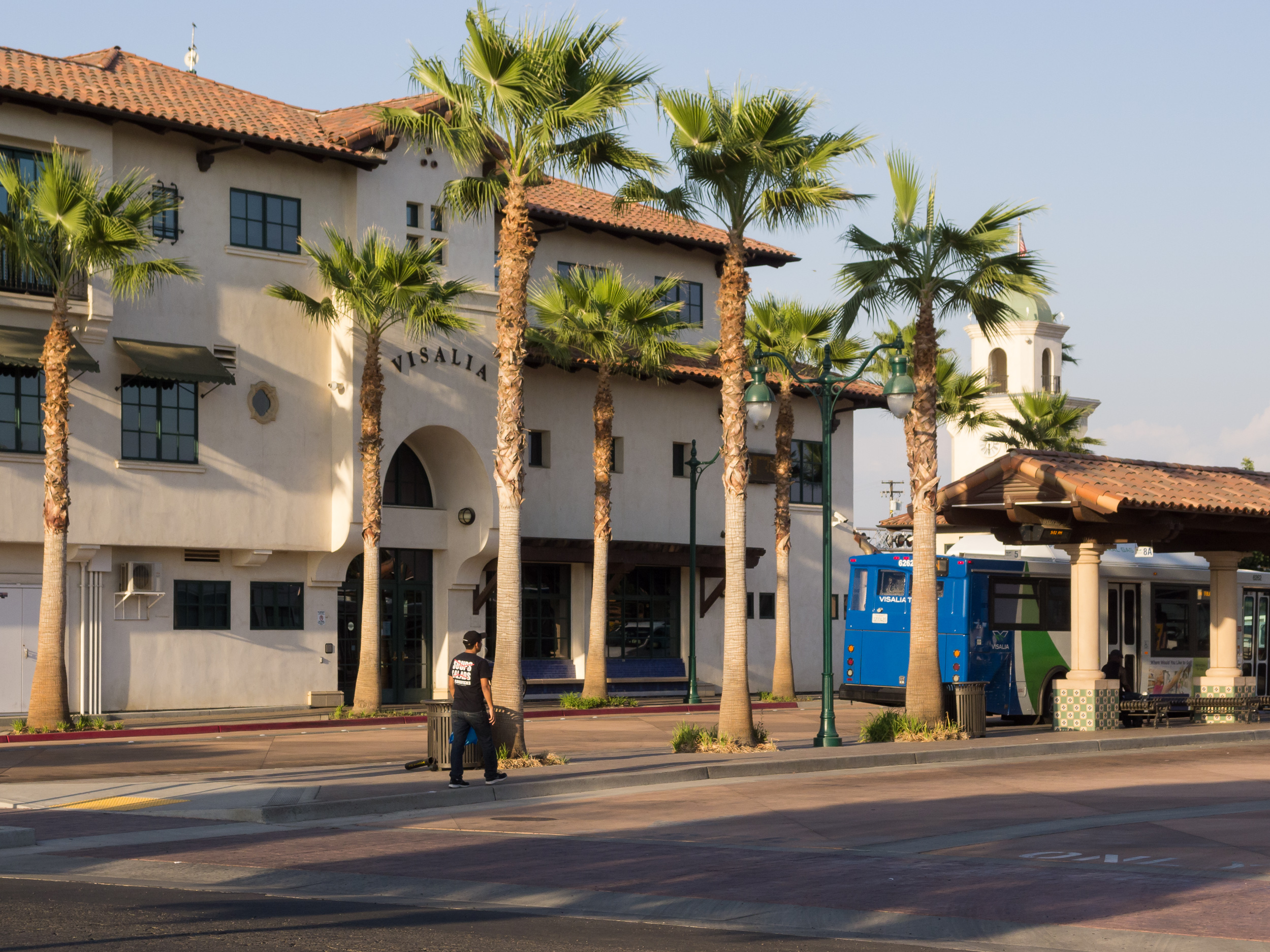
- Visalia Transit Center in 2013
- Parent: City of Visalia Transit Division
- Founded: 1981; 45 years ago
- Locale: Visalia, California
- Service type: Bus service, Dial-a-Ride
- Routes: 13
- Hubs: Visalia Transit Center
- Daily ridership: 2,100 (weekdays, Q4 2025)
- Annual ridership: 691,900 (2025)
- Operator: Transdev, soon RATP Dev
- Website: visaliatransit.info
System map (2021)
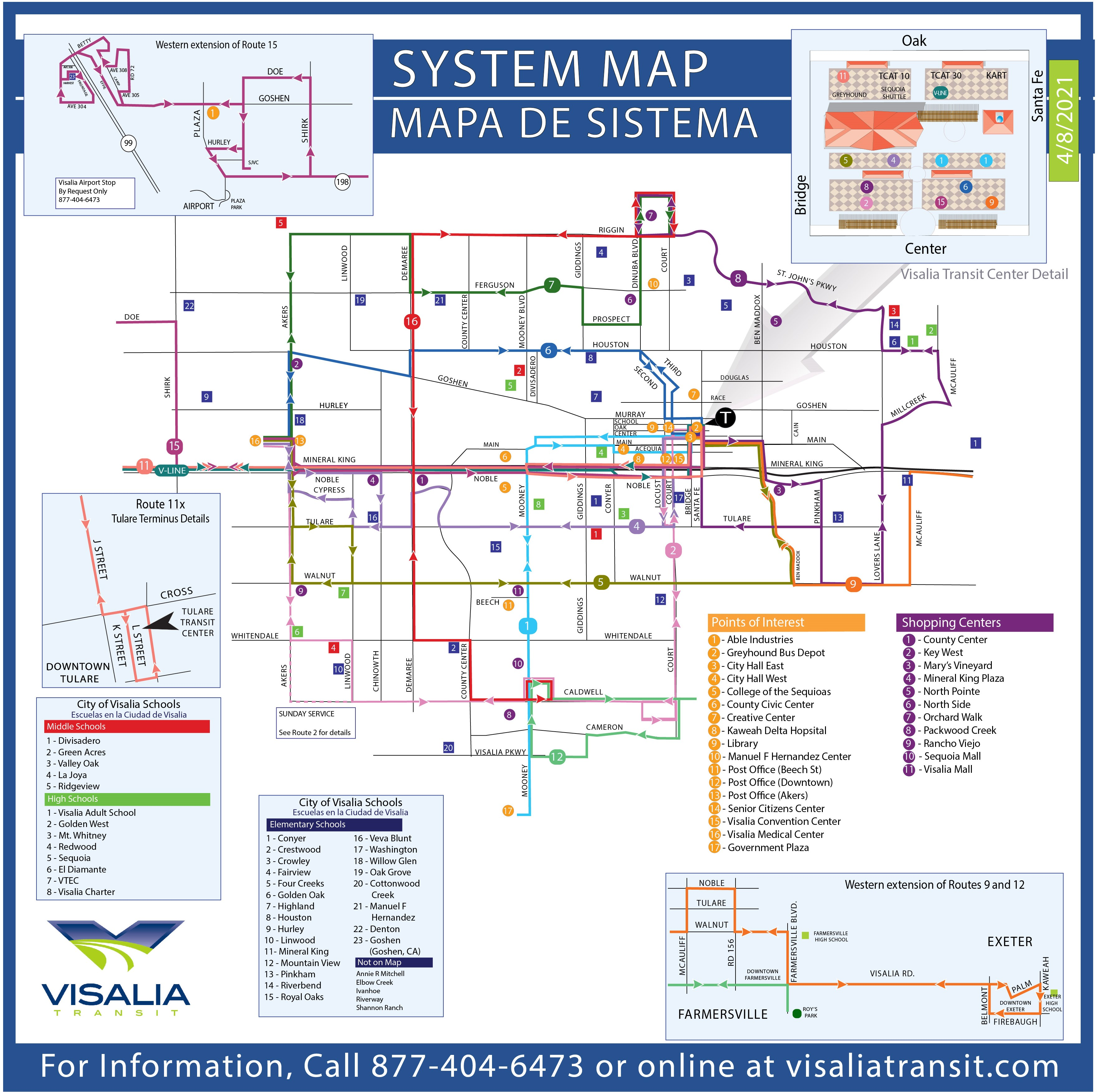

Visalia Transit is the primary bus agency serving residents and visitors to Visalia, California, the largest city and county seat of Tulare County, California. It is operated by the city through its contractor RATP Dev and offers both fixed routes and dial-a-ride local service within Visalia. In 2025, the system had a ridership of 691,900, or about 2,100 per weekday as of the fourth quarter of 2025.

Most routes operate out of the central transit center in Downtown Visalia. There are three secondary hubs located on the city's north, west, and south sides. Buses connecting Visalia's central transit hub to nearby census-designated places are handled by the Tulare County Regional Transit Agency including services to Dinuba (Route C10) and Woodlake (Route C30); Route C40 connects the southern hub in Visalia (Government Center) with Tulare and Porterville.

== History ==
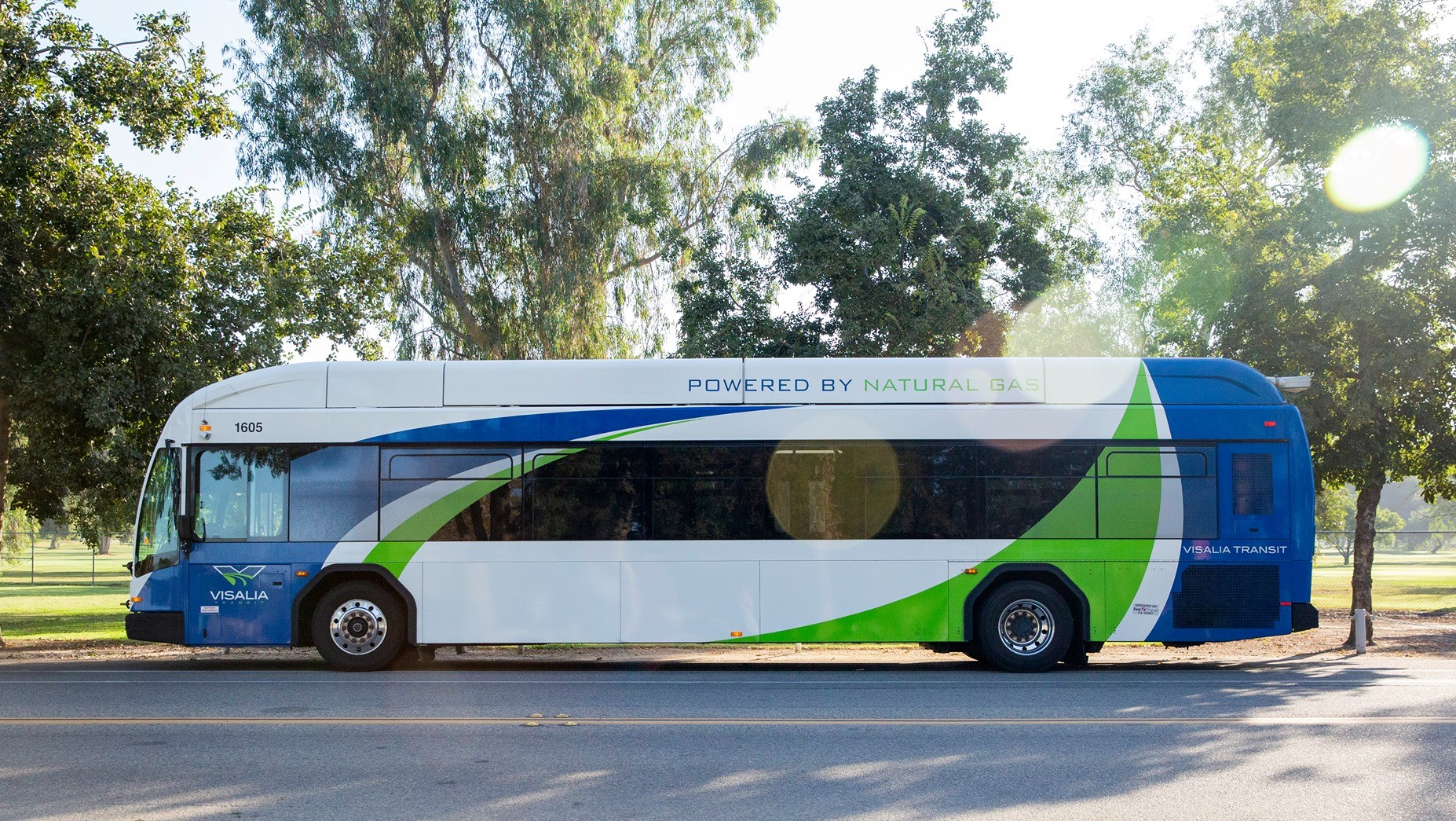
Visalia Transit bus

Public transportation in Visalia was initially provided by the Visalia Electric Railroad, which operated streetcars between 1904 and 1924. Local transit operations were taken over by the city of Visalia in 1981, spurred by growth in the city's size and population. The first routes were spokes radiating from a downtown hub; service expansion since then has included newer developments south and west of the original urban core, and routes to outlying communities such as Exeter, Farmersville, and Goshen.

The Visalia Towne Trolley service, operating a circulation route in downtown Visalia, started in November 1998. The Towne Trolley was discontinued in September 2017 due to low ridership and were made available for charter service, but low use led the City Council to sell four of the five trolleys in January 2019.

== Services ==
Visalia Transit operates seven days a week, with no service on specific holidays (New Year's Day, Easter, Memorial Day, Independence Day, Thanksgiving, and Christmas) and limited service on other holidays (President's Day, Labor Day, Christmas Eve, and New Year's Eve). The agency serves a population of approximately 138,207 in its 40 square miles (100 km^{2}) service area.

In addition to its fixed-route and dial-a-ride transportation services within Visalia, the city operates two special long-distance routes (V-LINE to Fresno and Sequoia Shuttle to Sequoia National Park), a free intracity shuttle for at-risk youths (LOOP), and maintains The Greenline, where callers may request information about Visalia Transit and other local agencies within Tulare County. The Greenline call center is staffed Monday through Saturday.

=== Fixed routes ===
Most fixed routes connect to the Visalia Transit Center (VTC) near downtown Visalia; many of these routes connect to secondary hubs on the west (Visalia Medical Clinic), south (Government Center and Sequoia Mall), or north (Orchard Walk/Target Dinuba Road).

Visalia Transit fixed routes
No.	Route name	Terminus (Note: "A" route origin / "B" route destination)	via	Terminus (Note: "A" route destination / "B" route origin)	Typical headway (minutes)	Notes / Refs.
1A/1B	Mooney	Visalia Transit Center	Mooney Blvd	Government Plaza (TCRTA transfer)	15 (weekday); 20 (weekend)	
2A/2B	Caldwell/Court	Visalia Transit Center	Court and Caldwell (Kaweah Delta Urgent Care)	Visalia Medical Clinic	30	
4A/4B	Tulare	Visalia Transit Center	Tulare	Visalia Medical Clinic	30	
5A/5B	Walnut	Visalia Transit Center	Walnut	Visalia Medical Clinic	30–45 (weekday); 30 (weekend)	
6A/6B	Murray	Visalia Transit Center	Houston & Goshen	Visalia Medical Clinic	60	
7A/7B	Ferguson	Visalia Medical Clinic	Goshen & Ferguson	Target (Dinuba Rd)	60	
8A/8B	Northeast	Visalia Transit Center	Noble, Lovers Lane, & McAuliff	Target (Dinuba Rd)	30-45	
9A/9B	Exeter – Farmersville	Visalia Transit Center	Ben Maddox, McAuliff, & Walnut	Farmersville & Exeter	45 (weekday); 90 (weekend)	
11X	Tulare Express	Visalia Transit Center	SR 198 & 99	Tulare Transit Center	30	Jointly operated with TCRTA.
12A/12B	Mooney Orchard	Sequoia Mall	Caldwell & Visalia Pkwy	Farmersville (Roy's Park)	60	
15A/15B	Goshen – Mineral King	Visalia Transit Center	Mineral King/Noble (Visalia Medical Clinic)	Goshen Elementary	45	
16A/16B	Demaree	Sequoia Mall	Demaree & Riggin	North Target	30	
17A/17B	Plaza	Visalia Medical Clinic	Shirk, Riggin, & Plaza (Amazon Facility)	San Joaquin Valley College	30	

=== Fares ===
Although exact cash fare is required, passes may be purchased at the farebox; change will be provided in the form of a change card, which is valid for one year after it was issued. Visalia offers the Rider Rewards reloadable smart card, available for purchase from the Visalia Transit Center; value may be added to the Rider Rewards card online. Monthly pass users with a Rider Rewards card qualify for discounts from certain local merchants.

Fare collection was temporarily suspended during the COVID-19 pandemic, but has resumed as of February 1, 2021.

	Regular	Veterans, Seniors (65+), Disabled, and Medicare	Children (6 & younger)
Single Ride	$1.75	$0.85	First two free, additional $1.75 each
All-Day Pass	$3.50	$2.50	First two free, additional $1.75 each
7-Day Pass	$14	$7.50	First two free, additional $1.75 each
Monthly Pass	$50	$30	First two free, additional $1.75 each
Regional T-Pass (Note: Allows riders to transfer to any fixed route within the county, excluding V-LINE and Sequoia Shuttle.)	$55 (Note: Price for a monthly pass. Discounted mid-month pass is $30, only sold after the 16th of each month.)	—	First two free, additional $1.75 each

=== Transfers ===
Although Visalia Transit connects with Tulare InterModal Express (TIME), Tulare County Area Transit (TCaT), Greyhound, and Kings Area Regional Transit (KART), transfers are accepted without charge from TCaT connections onto VT Route 1 only.

== V-LINE ==
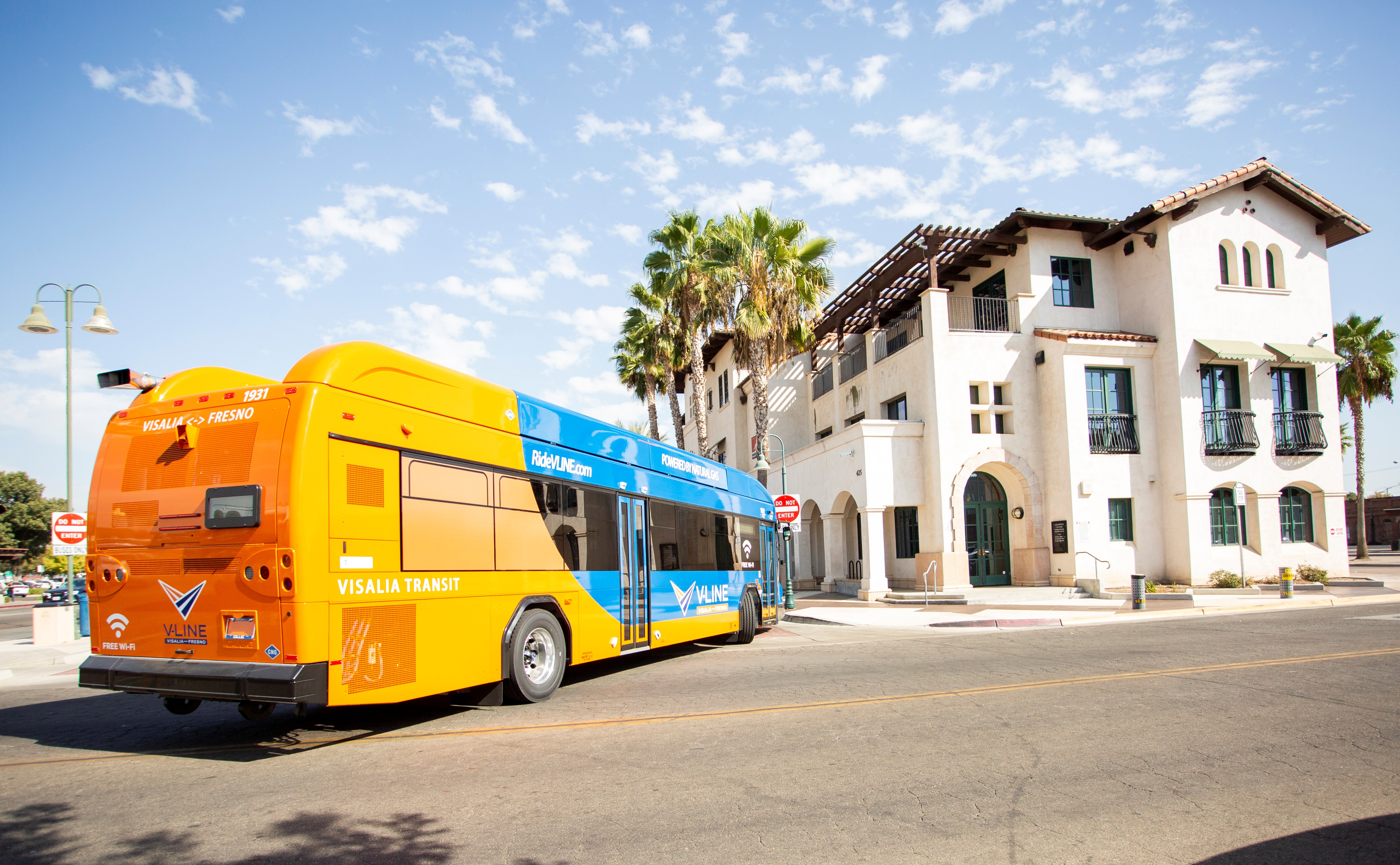
V-LINE bus at the Visalia Transit Center

Visalia Transit operates the V-LINE commuter service, connecting Visalia with Fresno.

V-LINE buses depart from the Visalia Transit Center and make stops at the Visalia Municipal Airport (main terminal), Fresno Yosemite International Airport, California State University, Fresno (near Maple & Shaw), and Courthouse Park in downtown Fresno, where riders can transfer to Fresno Area Express, Amtrak, and Greyhound Lines, before returning to Visalia. Typical headways on V-LINE range from 120 to 240 minutes. V-LINE is operated seven days a week with the exception of certain holidays (New Year's Day, Easter, Memorial Day, Independence Day, Thanksgiving Day, and Christmas Day). V-LINE passengers may park for free at the Visalia Airport for up to ten days. The route charges a premium fare. As of February 2023, a one-way ride is $10 for the general public and $9 for qualified riders (students, seniors, disabled, and military veterans); multiple-ride "punch passes" are available, bringing per-ride costs down to $7 and $6 (for 40 prepaid rides), respectively.

== Sequoia Shuttle ==
Visalia Transit operates the seasonal Sequoia Shuttle service, connecting Visalia with Sequoia National Park via Exeter, Three Rivers, and Lemon Cove.

The Sequoia Shuttle takes passengers to the Foothills Visitor Center and Giant Forest Monument in Sequoia National Park, where they may transfer to the park's internal shuttles. Due to the narrow roads to the park, Sequoia Shuttle buses are limited to 16 passengers, and reservations must be booked no later than 5 AM the day of travel as a result. The fare for Sequoia Shuttle is $20 for a round-trip, as approved by the Visalia City Council in 2019; it was the first fare increase since it was raised to $15 in 2008. The shuttles were canceled for the 2020 and 2021 seasons because of the ongoing COVID-19 pandemic in California.

== Fleet ==
As of 2016
Fleet no. (Qty)	Year	Mfr	Model	Length	Fuel	Notes
Fixed-route fleet
6267–6274, 6276 (9)	2008	Orion	VII NG	35'	CNG	
6283–6286 (4)	2009	Orion	VII NG	40'	CNG	
6287–6289 (3)	2009	Orion	VII NG	35'	CNG	
1301–1304 (4)	2013	Gillig	BRT Plus	40'	CNG	
1601–1607 (7)	2016	Gillig	BRT Plus	40'	CNG	
1801–1803 (3)	2018	Proterra	Catalyst	40'	Battery electric	
2101–2104 (4)	2021	Proterra	Catalyst	35'	Battery electric	
2301–2302 (2)	2023	New Flyer	XE35	35'	Battery electric	
2401–2402 (2)	2024	Gillig	Low Floor Plus	35'	Battery electric	
Trolley fleet
1829; 1874 (2)	2013	Freightliner / StarTrans	Supreme Classic	?	CNG	22 seats
Sequoia Shuttle fleet
6257–6259 (3)	2004	Gillig	Low Floor	35'	Diesel	31 seats
106–113 (8)	2007	Ford / Starcraft	AllStar	?	Gasoline	16 seats
114–115 (2)	2008	Ford / Starcraft	AllStar	?	Gasoline	16 seats
116–117 (2)	2009	Ford / Starcraft	AllStar	?	Gasoline	16 seats
1201–1204 (4)	2012	Gillig	BRT	35'	Diesel-electric hybrid	31 seats
1205–1206 (2)	2012	Gillig	BRT	29'	Diesel-electric hybrid	26 seats
118–119 (2)	2013	Ford / A-Z Buses	cutaway	?	Gasoline	16 seats
120 (1)	2015	Ford / Starcraft	AllStar	?	Gasoline	20 seats
121–126 (6)	2013	Ford / Glaval	cutaway	?	Gasoline	16 seats
1820–1821 (2)	2018	Gillig	BRT	29'	Diesel-electric hybrid	
V-LINE fleet
1501–1503 (3)	2016	Starcraft	AllStar	?	CNG	20 seats
1930–1931 (2)	2019	Gillig	BRT Plus	40'	CNG	

=== Facilities ===
The downtown Visalia Transit Center is at 425 E Oak Ave. Additional transfer points exist in the north (near the Orchard Walk shopping center), east (Ben Maddox and E Walnut), south (Sequoia Mall), and west (Visalia Medical Clinic).
