= Plainview, California =

Plainview
- census-designated place
- Location in Tulare County and the state of California

- Position in California.
- Coordinates: 36°08′32″N 119°08′15″W
- Country: United States
- State: California
- County: Tulare

Area
  - Total: 0.229 sq mi (0.592 km^{2})
  - Land: 0.229 sq mi (0.592 km^{2})
  - Water: 0 sq mi (0 km^{2}) 0%
- Elevation: 354 ft (108 m)

Population (2020)
  - Total: 846
  - Density: 3,700/sq mi (1,430/km^{2})
- Time zone: UTC-8 (Pacific (PST))
  - Summer (DST): UTC-7 (PDT)
- ZIP code: 93267
- Area code: 559
- GNIS feature ID: 2585439

Plainview is a census-designated place (CDP) in Tulare County, California, United States. Plainview sits at an elevation of 354 feet (108 m). The 2020 United States census reported Plainview's population as 846.

== Geography ==
According to the United States Census Bureau, the CDP covers an area of 0.2 square mile (0.6 km^{2}), all land.

== Demographics ==
Historical population
Census	Pop.	Note	%±
2010	846		—
2020	846		0.0%
U.S. Decennial Census; 1850–1870 1880-1890; 1900 1910 1920; 1930 1940 1950; 1960 1970 1980; 1990 2000 2010

Plainview first appeared as a census designated place in the 2010 U.S. census.

The 2020 United States census reported that Plainview had a population of 846. The population density was 3,710.5 inhabitants per square mile (1,432.6/km^{2}). The racial makeup of Plainview was 166 (19.6%) White, 2 (0.2%) African American, 10 (1.2%) Native American, 1 (0.1%) Asian, 0 (0.0%) Pacific Islander, 475 (56.1%) from other races, and 192 (22.7%) from two or more races. Hispanic or Latino of any race were 800 persons (94.6%).

The whole population lived in households. There were 210 households, out of which 118 (56.2%) had children under the age of 18 living in them, 109 (51.9%) were married-couple households, 10 (4.8%) were cohabiting couple households, 45 (21.4%) had a female householder with no partner present, and 46 (21.9%) had a male householder with no partner present. 28 households (13.3%) were one person, and 12 (5.7%) were one person aged 65 or older. The average household size was 4.03. There were 176 families (83.8% of all households).

The age distribution was 294 people (34.8%) under the age of 18, 99 people (11.7%) aged 18 to 24, 196 people (23.2%) aged 25 to 44, 178 people (21.0%) aged 45 to 64, and 79 people (9.3%) who were 65 years of age or older. The median age was 26.5 years. For every 100 females, there were 92.3 males.

There were 220 housing units at an average density of 964.9 units per square mile (372.5 units/km^{2}), of which 210 (95.5%) were occupied. Of these, 138 (65.7%) were owner-occupied, and 72 (34.3%) were occupied by renters.

== Education ==
Plainview is served by the Sunnyside Union Elementary School District and by the Porterville Unified School District for grades 9–12.
