= Strathmore, California =

Strathmore
- census-designated place
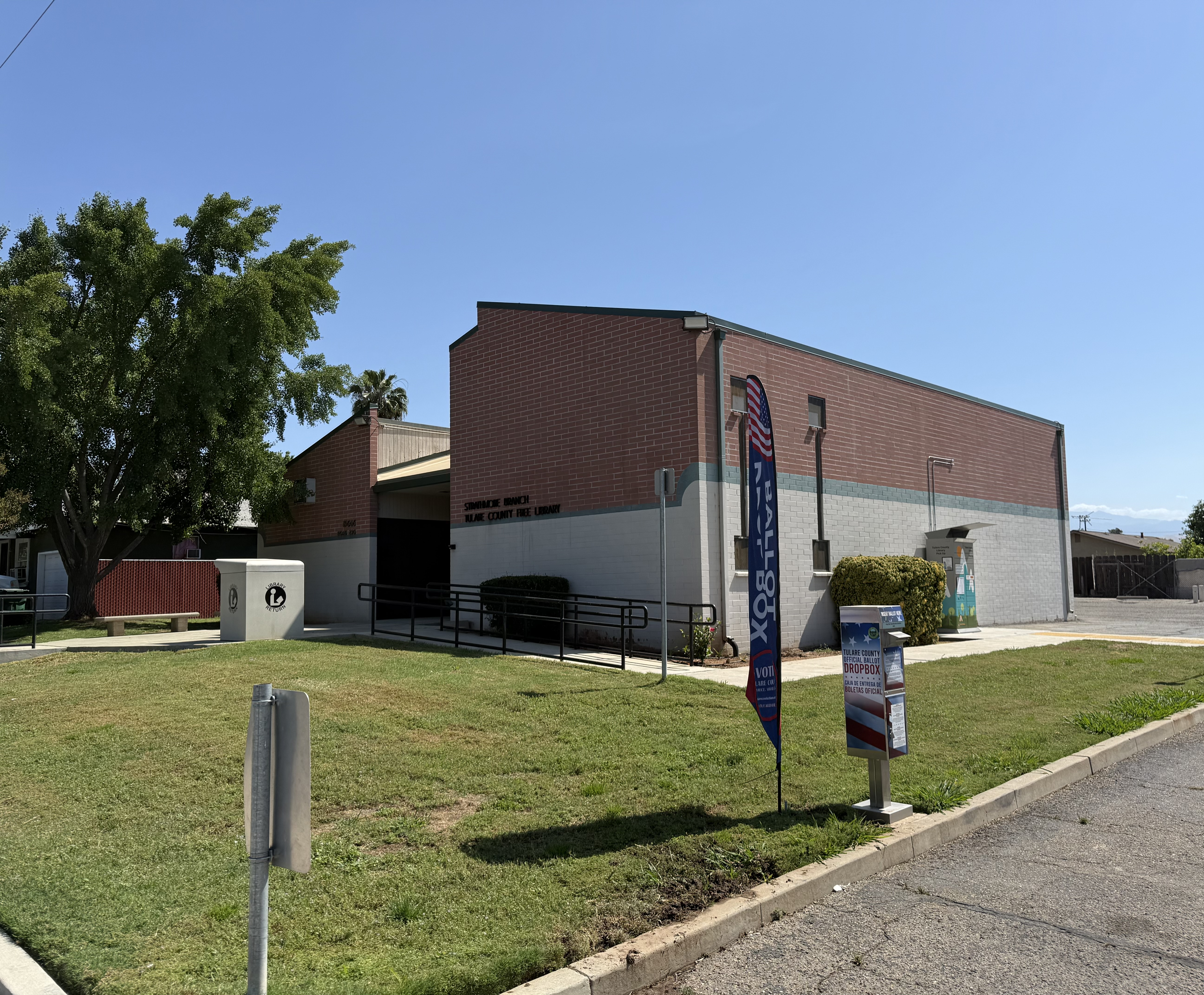
- Strathmore Library

- Location in Tulare County and the state of California

- Location in the United States
- Coordinates: 36°8′42″N 119°3′34″W
- Country: United States
- State: California
- County: Tulare

Area
  - Total: 1.411 sq mi (3.654 km^{2})
  - Land: 1.411 sq mi (3.654 km^{2})
  - Water: 0 sq mi (0 km^{2}) 0%
- Elevation: 400 ft (122 m)

Population (2020)
  - Total: 2,830
  - Density: 2,010/sq mi (774/km^{2})
- Time zone: UTC-8 (Pacific (PST))
  - Summer (DST): UTC-7 (PDT)
- ZIP code: 93267
- Area code: 559
- FIPS code: 06-75280
- GNIS feature ID: 1652797

Strathmore is a census-designated place (CDP) in Tulare County, California, United States. The population was 2,830 at the 2020 census, up from 2,819 at the 2010 census.

== History ==
Strathmore was given its name by the Scottish corporation Balfour Guthrie Company in 1908. It is a Scottish word which translates to “broad valley.” Previous names for Strathmore have been Roth Spur and Santos, CA.

== Geography ==
Strathmore is located at 36°8′42″N 119°3′34″W (36.144891, -119.059506).

According to the United States Census Bureau, the CDP has a total area of 1.4 square miles (3.6 km^{2}), all land.

=== Climate ===
According to the Köppen Climate Classification system, Strathmore has a semi-arid climate, abbreviated "BSk" on climate maps.

== Demographics ==
Historical population
Census	Pop.	Note	%±
1960	1,095		—
1970	1,221		11.5%
1980	1,955		60.1%
1990	2,353		20.4%
2000	2,584		9.8%
2010	2,819		9.1%
2020	2,830		0.4%
U.S. Decennial Census; 1860–1870 1880-1890; 1900 1910 1920; 1930 1940 1950; 1960 1970 1980; 1990 2000 2010

Strathmore first appeared as a census designated place in the 1960 U.S. census; and as a census designated place in the 1980 U.S. census.

=== 2020 census ===
As of the 2020 census, Strathmore had a population of 2,830 and a population density of 2,005.7 inhabitants per square mile (774.4/km^{2}).

The age distribution was 33.1% under the age of 18, 11.0% aged 18 to 24, 25.4% aged 25 to 44, 20.0% aged 45 to 64, and 10.5% who were 65 years of age or older. The median age was 29.0 years. For every 100 females, there were 95.7 males, and for every 100 females age 18 and over there were 98.6 males age 18 and over.

0.0% of residents lived in urban areas, while 100.0% lived in rural areas.

The whole population lived in households. There were 745 households, out of which 54.0% included children under the age of 18, 51.4% were married-couple households, 7.9% were cohabiting couple households, 22.6% had a female householder with no partner present, and 18.1% had a male householder with no partner present. 12.9% of households were one person, and 5.9% were one person aged 65 or older. The average household size was 3.80. There were 618 families (83.0% of all households).

There were 769 housing units at an average density of 545.0 units per square mile (210.4 units/km^{2}), of which 745 (96.9%) were occupied and 24 (3.1%) were vacant. Of occupied units, 51.8% were owner-occupied and 48.2% were occupied by renters. The homeowner vacancy rate was 1.3%, and the rental vacancy rate was 0.3%.

Racial composition as of the 2020 census
Race	Number	Percent
White	896	31.7%
Black or African American	1	0.0%
American Indian and Alaska Native	74	2.6%
Asian	6	0.2%
Native Hawaiian and Other Pacific Islander	1	0.0%
Some other race	1,393	49.2%
Two or more races	459	16.2%
Hispanic or Latino (of any race)	2,348	83.0%

=== Income and poverty ===
In 2023, the US Census Bureau estimated that the median household income was $42,705, and the per capita income was $11,190. About 35.3% of families and 32.0% of the population were below the poverty line.

=== 2010 census ===
At the 2010 census Strathmore had a population of 2,819. The population density was 1,986.0 inhabitants per square mile (766.8/km^{2}). The racial makeup of Strathmore was 1,490 (52.9%) White, 12 (0.4%) African American, 41 (1.5%) Native American, 7 (0.2%) Asian, 1 (0.0%) Pacific Islander, 1,162 (41.2%) from other races, and 106 (3.8%) from two or more races. Hispanic or Latino of any race were 2,238 persons (79.4%).

The whole population lived in households, no one lived in non-institutionalized group quarters and no one was institutionalized.

There were 705 households, 422 (59.9%) had children under the age of 18 living in them, 411 (58.3%) were opposite-sex married couples living together, 130 (18.4%) had a female householder with no husband present, 54 (7.7%) had a male householder with no wife present. There were 51 (7.2%) unmarried opposite-sex partnerships, and 4 (0.6%) same-sex married couples or partnerships. 93 households (13.2%) were one person and 40 (5.7%) had someone living alone who was 65 or older. The average household size was 4.00. There were 595 families (84.4% of households); the average family size was 4.35.

The age distribution was 1,051 people (37.3%) under the age of 18, 340 people (12.1%) aged 18 to 24, 696 people (24.7%) aged 25 to 44, 531 people (18.8%) aged 45 to 64, and 201 people (7.1%) who were 65 or older. The median age was 25.5 years. For every 100 females, there were 99.6 males. For every 100 females age 18 and over, there were 101.1 males.

There were 751 housing units at an average density of 529.1 per square mile, of the occupied units 366 (51.9%) were owner-occupied and 339 (48.1%) were rented. The homeowner vacancy rate was 1.9%; the rental vacancy rate was 6.4%. 1,475 people (52.3% of the population) lived in owner-occupied housing units and 1,344 people (47.7%) lived in rental housing units.

== Politics ==
In the state legislature, Strathmore is in the 16th senatorial district, represented by Democrat Melissa Hurtado, and in the 33rd Assembly district, represented by Republican Alexandra Macedo.

In the United States House of Representatives, Strathmore is in California's 22nd congressional district, represented by Republican David Valadao

== Education ==
Almost all of the CDP is in the Strathmore Union Elementary School District, while a small piece is in the Sunnyside Union Elementary School District. All of it is in the Porterville Unified School District for grades 9–12.
