= Sultana, California =

Sultana
- census-designated place
- Location in Tulare County and the state of California

- Location within California Location within the United States
- Coordinates: 36°32′44″N 119°20′24″W
- Country: United States
- State: California
- County: Tulare

Area
  - Total: 0.376 sq mi (0.974 km^{2})
  - Land: 0.376 sq mi (0.974 km^{2})
  - Water: 0 sq mi (0 km^{2}) 0%
- Elevation: 364 ft (111 m)

Population (2020)
  - Total: 779
  - Density: 2,070/sq mi (800/km^{2})
- Time zone: UTC-8 (Pacific (PST))
  - Summer (DST): UTC-7 (PDT)
- ZIP code: 93666
- Area code: 559
- GNIS feature IDs: 1659912; 2585453

Sultana is a census-designated place in Tulare County, California, United States. Sultana is 2.5 miles (4.0 km) east of Dinuba. Sultana has a post office with ZIP code 93666. The population was 779 at the 2020 census.

== Geography ==
According to the United States Census Bureau, the CDP covers an area of 0.4 square mile (1.0 km^{2}), all land.

== Demographics ==
Historical population
Census	Pop.	Note	%±
2010	775		—
2020	779		0.5%
U.S. Decennial Census; 1850–1870 1880-1890; 1900 1910 1920; 1930 1940 1950; 1960 1970 1980; 1990 2000 2010

Sultana first appeared as a census designated place in the 2010 U.S. census.

The 2020 United States census reported that Sultana had a population of 779. The population density was 2,071.8 inhabitants per square mile (799.9/km^{2}). The racial makeup of Sultana was 183 (23.5%) White, 5 (0.6%) African American, 14 (1.8%) Native American, 1 (0.1%) Asian, 0 (0.0%) Pacific Islander, 413 (53.0%) from other races, and 163 (20.9%) from two or more races. Hispanic or Latino of any race were 716 persons (91.9%).

The whole population lived in households. There were 206 households, out of which 118 (57.3%) had children under the age of 18 living in them, 109 (52.9%) were married-couple households, 26 (12.6%) were cohabiting couple households, 40 (19.4%) had a female householder with no partner present, and 31 (15.0%) had a male householder with no partner present. 23 households (11.2%) were one person, and 11 (5.3%) were one person aged 65 or older. The average household size was 3.78. There were 174 families (84.5% of all households).

The age distribution was 271 people (34.8%) under the age of 18, 70 people (9.0%) aged 18 to 24, 202 people (25.9%) aged 25 to 44, 168 people (21.6%) aged 45 to 64, and 68 people (8.7%) who were 65 years of age or older. The median age was 28.8 years. For every 100 females, there were 118.8 males.

There were 223 housing units at an average density of 593.1 units per square mile (229.0 units/km^{2}), of which 206 (92.4%) were occupied. Of these, 68 (33.0%) were owner-occupied, and 138 (67.0%) were occupied by renters.

== Education ==
Sultana is served by the Monson-Sultana Joint Union Elementary School District and the Dinuba Unified School District for grades 9–12.
