= East Orosi, California =

East Orosi
- unincorporated community census-designated place
- Location in Tulare County and the state of California

- Location in the United States
- Coordinates: 36°32′51″N 119°15′40″W
- Country: United States
- State: California
- County: Tulare

Area
  - Total: 0.25 sq mi (0.64 km^{2})
  - Land: 0.25 sq mi (0.64 km^{2})
  - Water: 0 sq mi (0.00 km^{2}) 0%
- Elevation: 390 ft (120 m)

Population (2020)
  - Total: 423
  - Density: 1,705.8/sq mi (658.62/km^{2})
- Time zone: UTC-8 (Pacific (PST))
  - Summer (DST): UTC-7 (PDT)
- ZIP code: 93647
- Area code: 559
- FIPS code: 06-20942
- GNIS feature ID: 1658460

East Orosi is an unincorporated community in Tulare County, California, United States. The population was 423 at the 2020 census, down from 495 at the 2010 census. For statistical purposes, the United States Census Bureau has defined East Orosi as a census-designated place (CDP).

== Geography ==
According to the United States Census Bureau, the CDP has a total area of 0.25 square miles (0.65 km^{2}), all land.

== Demographics ==
Historical population
Census	Pop.	Note	%±
2000	426		—
2010	495		16.2%
2020	423		−14.5%
U.S. Decennial Census; 1860–1870 1880-1890; 1900 1910 1920; 1930 1940 1950; 1960 1970 1980; 1990 2000 2010

East Orosi first appeared as a census designated place in the 2000 U.S. census.

=== 2020 ===
The 2020 United States census reported that East Orosi had a population of 423. The population density was 1,705.6 inhabitants per square mile (658.5/km^{2}). The racial makeup of East Orosi was 100 (23.6%) White, 3 (0.7%) African American, 9 (2.1%) Native American, 7 (1.7%) Asian, 1 (0.2%) Pacific Islander, 245 (57.9%) from other races, and 58 (13.7%) from two or more races. Hispanic or Latino of any race were 396 persons (93.6%).

The whole population lived in households. There were 105 households, out of which 59 (56.2%) had children under the age of 18 living in them, 57 (54.3%) were married-couple households, 8 (7.6%) were cohabiting couple households, 30 (28.6%) had a female householder with no partner present, and 10 (9.5%) had a male householder with no partner present. 8 households (7.6%) were one person, and 5 (4.8%) were one person aged 65 or older. The average household size was 4.03. There were 91 families (86.7% of all households).

The age distribution was 153 people (36.2%) under the age of 18, 32 people (7.6%) aged 18 to 24, 103 people (24.3%) aged 25 to 44, 105 people (24.8%) aged 45 to 64, and 30 people (7.1%) who were 65 years of age or older. The median age was 30.3 years. For every 100 females, there were 104.3 males.

There were 109 housing units at an average density of 439.5 units per square mile (169.7 units/km^{2}), of which 105 (96.3%) were occupied. Of these, 47 (44.8%) were owner-occupied, and 58 (55.2%) were occupied by renters.

=== 2010 ===
The 2010 United States census reported that East Orosi had a population of 495. The population density was 1,996.2 inhabitants per square mile (770.7/km^{2}). The racial makeup of East Orosi was 209 (42.2%) White, 0 (0.0%) African American, 5 (1.0%) Native American, 2 (0.4%) Asian, 1 (0.2%) Pacific Islander, 261 (52.7%) from other races, and 17 (3.4%) from two or more races. Hispanic or Latino of any race were 466 persons (94.1%).

The Census reported that 495 people (100% of the population) lived in households, 0 (0%) lived in non-institutionalized group quarters, and 0 (0%) were institutionalized.

There were 112 households, out of which 73 (65.2%) had children under the age of 18 living in them, 57 (50.9%) were opposite-sex married couples living together, 19 (17.0%) had a female householder with no husband present, 17 (15.2%) had a male householder with no wife present. There were 16 (14.3%) unmarried opposite-sex partnerships, and 0 (0%) same-sex married couples or partnerships. 11 households (9.8%) were made up of individuals, and 3 (2.7%) had someone living alone who was 65 years of age or older. The average household size was 4.42. There were 93 families (83.0% of all households); the average family size was 4.73.

The population was spread out, with 181 people (36.6%) under the age of 18, 72 people (14.5%) aged 18 to 24, 137 people (27.7%) aged 25 to 44, 74 people (14.9%) aged 45 to 64, and 31 people (6.3%) who were 65 years of age or older. The median age was 24.2 years. For every 100 females, there were 126.0 males. For every 100 females age 18 and over, there were 130.9 males.

There were 116 housing units at an average density of 467.8 per square mile (180.6/km^{2}), of which 46 (41.1%) were owner-occupied, and 66 (58.9%) were occupied by renters. The homeowner vacancy rate was 2.1%; the rental vacancy rate was 1.5%. 192 people (38.8% of the population) lived in owner-occupied housing units and 303 people (61.2%) lived in rental housing units.

=== 2000 ===
As of the census of 2000, the median income for a household in the CDP was $26,071, and the median income for a family was $27,738. Males had a median income of $26,902 versus $9,500 for females. The per capita income for the CDP was $4,984. About 37.1% of families and 51.4% of the population were below the poverty line, including 65.7% of those under age 18 and none of those age 65 or over.

== Government ==
In the California State Legislature, East Orosi is in the 16th senatorial district, represented by Democrat Melissa Hurtado, and the 33rd Assembly district, represented by Republican Alexandra Macedo.

In the United States House of Representatives, East Orosi is in California's 21st congressional district, represented by Democrat Jim Costa.

== Infrastructure ==
The community relies on two contaminated wells for household water. The water supply is tainted by nitrates, arsenic or bacteria traced to decades of agricultural runoff.

== Education ==
East Orosi is served by the Cutler-Orosi Joint Unified School District.
