= Woodville, California =

Woodville
- census-designated place
- Location in Tulare County and the state of California

- Location in the United States
- Coordinates: 36°5′31″N 119°12′0″W
- Country: United States
- State: California
- County: Tulare

Area
  - Total: 1.00 sq mi (2.58 km^{2})
  - Land: 1.00 sq mi (2.58 km^{2})
  - Water: 0 sq mi (0 km^{2}) 0%
- Elevation: 338 ft (103 m)

Population (2020)
  - Total: 1,680
  - Density: 1,690/sq mi (651/km^{2})
- Time zone: UTC-8 (Pacific (PST))
  - Summer (DST): UTC-7 (PDT)
- ZIP code: 93257
- Area code: 559
- FIPS code: 06-86482
- GNIS feature ID: 1661710

Woodville is a census-designated place (CDP) in Tulare County, California, United States. The population was 1,680 at the 2020 census, down from 1,740 at the 2010 census.

== Geography ==
Woodville is located at 36°5′31″N 119°12′0″W (36.091847, -119.200116).

According to the United States Census Bureau, the CDP has a total area of 1.0 square mile (2.6 km^{2}), all land.

== Demographics ==
Historical population
Census	Pop.	Note	%±
1960	1,045		—
1970	1,031		−1.3%
1980	1,507		46.2%
1990	1,557		3.3%
2000	1,678		7.8%
2010	1,740		3.7%
2020	1,680		−3.4%
U.S. Decennial Census; 1850–1870 1880-1890; 1900 1910 1920; 1930 1940 1950; 1960 1970 1980; 1990 2000 2010

Woodville first appeared as an unincorporated place in the 1960 U.S. census; and then as a census designated place in the 1980 U.S. census.

=== 2020 census ===
As of the 2020 census, Woodville had a population of 1,680 and a population density of 1,683.4 inhabitants per square mile (650.0/km^{2}). The median age was 31.3 years. The age distribution was 30.8% under the age of 18, 11.1% aged 18 to 24, 24.4% aged 25 to 44, 23.8% aged 45 to 64, and 9.9% who were 65 years of age or older. For every 100 females, there were 111.6 males, and for every 100 females age 18 and over there were 112.4 males age 18 and over.

0.0% of residents lived in urban areas, while 100.0% lived in rural areas.

The whole population lived in households. There were 423 households, of which 58.6% had children under the age of 18 living in them. Of all households, 51.1% were married-couple households, 6.9% were cohabiting couple households, 13.7% were households with a male householder and no spouse or partner present, and 28.4% were households with a female householder and no spouse or partner present. About 8.0% of all households were made up of individuals and 4.2% had someone living alone who was 65 years of age or older. The average household size was 3.97. There were 372 families (87.9% of all households).

There were 433 housing units at an average density of 433.9 units per square mile (167.5 units/km^{2}). Of those, 423 (97.7%) were occupied and 2.3% were vacant. Of occupied units, 53.7% were owner-occupied and 46.3% were occupied by renters. The homeowner vacancy rate was 0.0% and the rental vacancy rate was 0.0%.

Racial composition as of the 2020 census
Race	Number	Percent
White	452	26.9%
Black or African American	0	0.0%
American Indian and Alaska Native	36	2.1%
Asian	2	0.1%
Native Hawaiian and Other Pacific Islander	1	0.1%
Some other race	942	56.1%
Two or more races	247	14.7%
Hispanic or Latino (of any race)	1,522	90.6%

=== 2023 estimates ===
In 2023, the US Census Bureau estimated that the median household income was $45,089, and the per capita income was $15,711. About 25.9% of families and 26.5% of the population were below the poverty line.

== Government ==
In the California State Legislature, Woodville is in the 16th senatorial district, represented by Democrat Melissa Hurtado, and in the 33rd Assembly district, represented by Republican Alexandra Macedo.

In the United States House of Representatives, Woodville is in California's 22nd congressional district, represented by Republican David Valadao.

== Education ==
Woodville is served by the Woodville Elementary School District and by the Porterville Unified School District for grades 9–12.
