= Lindsay, California =

City in California, United States

- City
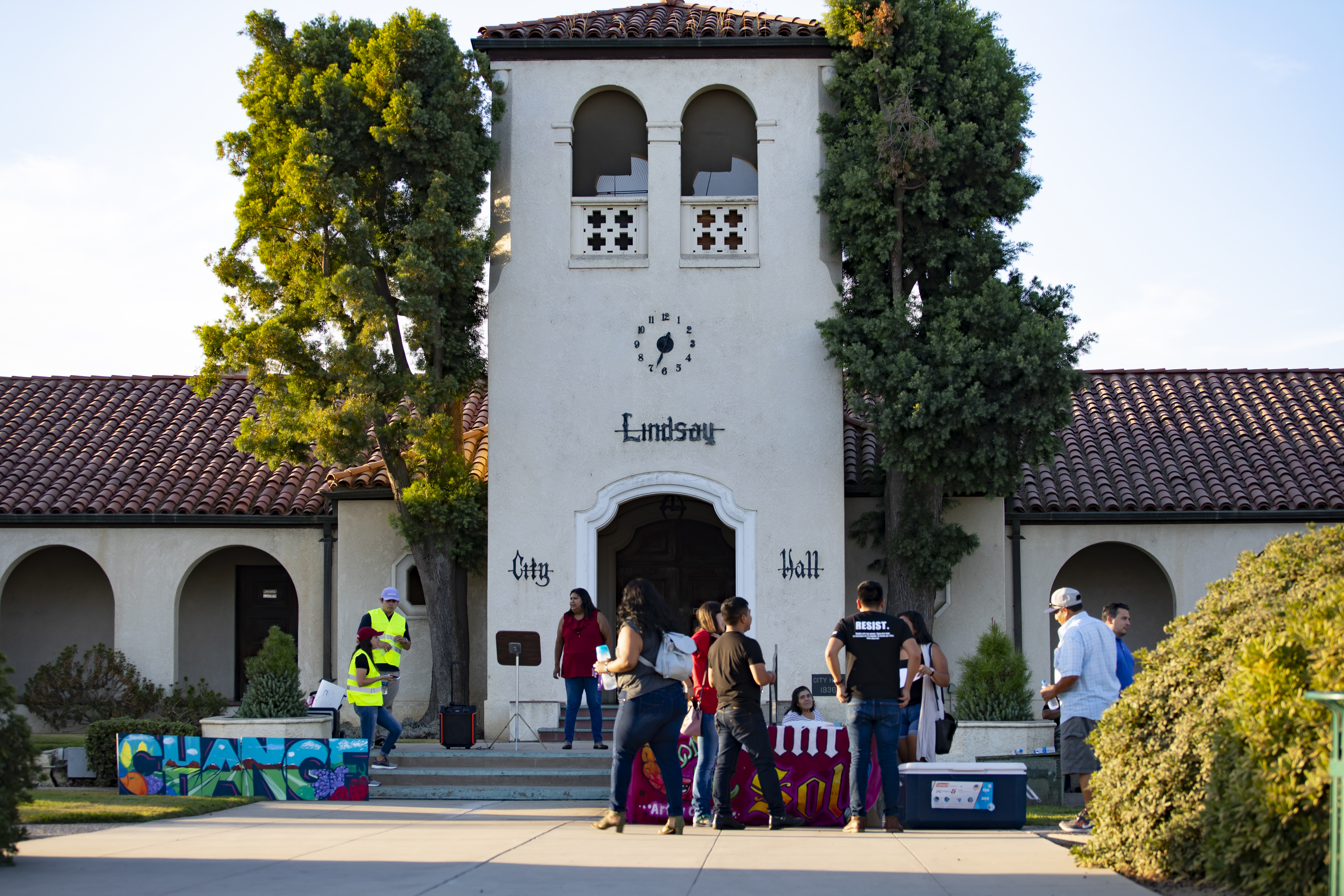
- Lindsay City Hall
- Motto: Central California's Citrus Center
- Interactive map of Lindsay, California
- Location in the United States
- Coordinates: 36°12′N 119°5′W
- Country: United States
- State: California
- County: Tulare
- Incorporated: February 28, 1910

Government
  - Type: Mayor
  - Mayor: Misty Villarreal

Area
  - Total: 2.72 sq mi (7.05 km^{2})
  - Land: 2.72 sq mi (7.05 km^{2})
  - Water: 0 sq mi (0.00 km^{2}) 0%
- Elevation: 387 ft (118 m)

Population (2020)
  - Total: 12,659
  - Density: 4,943.4/sq mi (1,908.64/km^{2})
- Time zone: UTC-8 (Pacific (PST))
  - Summer (DST): UTC-7 (PDT)
- ZIP code: 93247
- Area code: 559
- FIPS code: 06-41712
- GNIS feature ID: 1652744
- Website: www.lindsay.ca.us

Lindsay is a city in Tulare County, California, United States. The population was 12,659 at the 2020 census. Lindsay is located southeast of Visalia and north of Porterville and is considered part of the Visalia-Porterville Metropolitan Area and the Porterville Urban Area by the United States Census Bureau.

== History ==
The Yandanchei tribe of Native Americans came to hunt and fish at the future site of Lindsay for centuries. Future Military Governor of California John C. Frémont passed through twice by way of the Stockton - Los Angeles Road and the later Butterfield Overland Mail route on two of his exploration trips. Julius Orton, a seventh generation descendant of Thomas, served as security for a pack train headed for Placerville, a booming California gold mining town, motivated by his futile search for gold. In 1859, with his wife and two small daughters, and driving a small herd of cattle, walked more than 200 miles (320 km) to a homestead along the Tule River, southwest of Lindsay. In the 1880s, Julius Orton homesteaded another (160 acres (0.65 km^{2})) piece of land bordering on the property of pioneers Lewis and John Keeley, brothers who had taken on a homestead just a few miles southwest of Lindsay in the mid-1870s.

In 1889, the founder of the City of Lindsay, Captain Arthur Hutchinson, moved to California because of his ill health. He moved to the Lindsay area and bought 2,000 acres (8.1 km^{2}) to found the Lindsay Land Company. When the Southern Pacific Railroad came through the area in 1889, development of the Lindsay town-site was begun. Hutchinson laid out the plan for the township, and named the community after his wife, Sadie Lindsay Patton Hutchinson.

== Geography ==
According to the United States Census Bureau, the city has a total area of 2.7 square miles (7.1 km^{2}), all land.

=== Climate ===
According to the Köppen Climate Classification system, Lindsay has a semi-arid climate(BSk) with hot, dry summers and cool, wet winters.

Climate data for Lindsay, California (1991–2020 normals, extremes 1913–present)
Month	Jan	Feb	Mar	Apr	May	Jun	Jul	Aug	Sep	Oct	Nov	Dec	Year
Record high °F (°C)	81 (27)	87 (31)	96 (36)	100 (38)	107 (42)	114 (46)	115 (46)	113 (45)	112 (44)	102 (39)	91 (33)	82 (28)	115 (46)
Mean maximum °F (°C)	71.2 (21.8)	76.1 (24.5)	83.5 (28.6)	91.1 (32.8)	98.3 (36.8)	104.2 (40.1)	106.0 (41.1)	105.6 (40.9)	102.2 (39.0)	94.0 (34.4)	81.1 (27.3)	70.2 (21.2)	107.7 (42.1)
Mean daily maximum °F (°C)	57.1 (13.9)	62.7 (17.1)	69.0 (20.6)	74.5 (23.6)	82.6 (28.1)	90.6 (32.6)	96.3 (35.7)	95.6 (35.3)	90.5 (32.5)	79.2 (26.2)	65.9 (18.8)	57.3 (14.1)	76.8 (24.9)
Daily mean °F (°C)	47.0 (8.3)	51.3 (10.7)	56.2 (13.4)	60.6 (15.9)	67.5 (19.7)	74.3 (23.5)	80.4 (26.9)	78.9 (26.1)	73.9 (23.3)	64.2 (17.9)	53.6 (12.0)	46.6 (8.1)	62.9 (17.2)
Mean daily minimum °F (°C)	37.0 (2.8)	39.9 (4.4)	43.5 (6.4)	46.8 (8.2)	52.4 (11.3)	58.0 (14.4)	64.4 (18.0)	62.3 (16.8)	57.3 (14.1)	49.1 (9.5)	41.2 (5.1)	36.0 (2.2)	49.0 (9.4)
Mean minimum °F (°C)	27.7 (−2.4)	30.1 (−1.1)	33.9 (1.1)	36.2 (2.3)	41.8 (5.4)	47.4 (8.6)	55.8 (13.2)	54.3 (12.4)	47.8 (8.8)	39.7 (4.3)	31.1 (−0.5)	26.9 (−2.8)	25.9 (−3.4)
Record low °F (°C)	18 (−8)	22 (−6)	25 (−4)	26 (−3)	33 (1)	39 (4)	46 (8)	44 (7)	35 (2)	28 (−2)	23 (−5)	17 (−8)	17 (−8)
Average precipitation inches (mm)	2.25 (57)	2.18 (55)	2.00 (51)	1.25 (32)	0.49 (12)	0.10 (2.5)	0.08 (2.0)	0.01 (0.25)	0.07 (1.8)	0.65 (17)	1.11 (28)	1.93 (49)	12.12 (307.55)
Average snowfall inches (cm)	0.2 (0.51)	0.0 (0.0)	0.0 (0.0)	0.0 (0.0)	0.0 (0.0)	0.0 (0.0)	0.0 (0.0)	0.0 (0.0)	0.0 (0.0)	0.0 (0.0)	0.0 (0.0)	0.0 (0.0)	0.2 (0.51)
Average precipitation days (≥ 0.01 in)	8.6	7.9	6.5	4.3	2.6	0.5	0.1	0.2	0.5	2.3	4.4	7.3	45.2
Average snowy days (≥ 0.1 in)	0.0	0.0	0.0	0.0	0.0	0.0	0.0	0.0	0.0	0.0	0.0	0.0	0.0
Source: NOAA

== Demographics ==
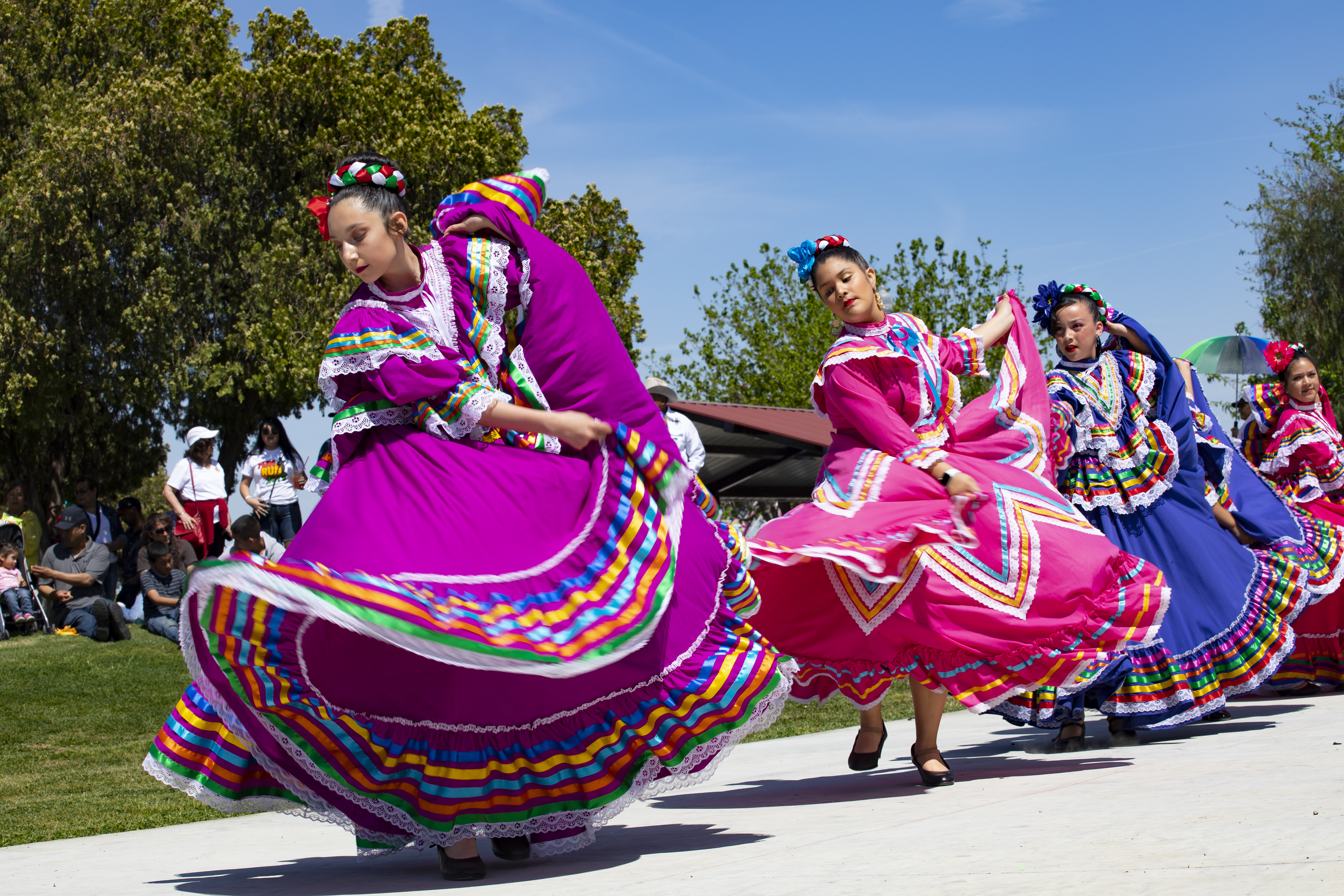
Celebrations at the annual Orange Blossom Festival.

Historical population
Census	Pop.	Note	%±
1910	1,814		—
1920	2,576		42.0%
1930	3,878		50.5%
1940	4,397		13.4%
1950	5,060		15.1%
1960	5,397		6.7%
1970	5,206		−3.5%
1980	6,936		33.2%
1990	8,338		20.2%
2000	10,297		23.5%
2010	11,768		14.3%
2020	12,659		7.6%
2024 (est.)	12,706	▲	0.4%
U.S. Decennial Census

=== 2020 census ===
As of the 2020 census, Lindsay had a population of 12,659. The median age was 28.2 years. 34.5% of residents were under the age of 18 and 9.4% of residents were 65 years of age or older. For every 100 females there were 96.1 males, and for every 100 females age 18 and over there were 93.2 males age 18 and over.

99.2% of residents lived in urban areas, while 0.8% lived in rural areas.

There were 3,462 households in Lindsay, of which 56.7% had children under the age of 18 living in them. Of all households, 49.3% were married-couple households, 14.8% were households with a male householder and no spouse or partner present, and 28.3% were households with a female householder and no spouse or partner present. About 14.2% of all households were made up of individuals and 6.7% had someone living alone who was 65 years of age or older.

There were 3,576 housing units, of which 3.2% were vacant. The homeowner vacancy rate was 0.7% and the rental vacancy rate was 2.0%.

Racial composition as of the 2020 census
Race	Number	Percent
White	3,246	25.6%
Black or African American	59	0.5%
American Indian and Alaska Native	230	1.8%
Asian	204	1.6%
Native Hawaiian and Other Pacific Islander	17	0.1%
Some other race	6,813	53.8%
Two or more races	2,090	16.5%
Hispanic or Latino (of any race)	11,267	89.0%

=== 2010 census ===
At the 2010 census Lindsay had a population of 11,768. The population density was 4,509.4 inhabitants per square mile (1,741.1/km^{2}). The racial makeup of Lindsay was 6,480 (55.1%) White, 85 (0.7%) African American, 128 (1.1%) Native American, 267 (2.3%) Asian, 4 (0.0%) Pacific Islander, 4,367 (37.1%) from other races, and 437 (3.7%) from two or more races. Hispanic or Latino of any race were 10,056 persons (85.5%).

The census reported that 11,672 people (99.2% of the population) lived in households, no one lived in non-institutionalized group quarters and 96 (0.8%) were institutionalized.

There were 3,014 households, 1,890 (62.7%) had children under the age of 18 living in them, 1,719 (57.0%) were opposite-sex married couples living together, 578 (19.2%) had a female householder with no husband present, 233 (7.7%) had a male householder with no wife present. There were 242 (8.0%) unmarried opposite-sex partnerships, and 19 (0.6%) same-sex married couples or partnerships. 401 households (13.3%) were one person and 210 (7.0%) had someone living alone who was 65 or older. The average household size was 3.87. There were 2,530 families (83.9% of households); the average family size was 4.21.

The age distribution was 4,523 people (38.4%) under the age of 18, 1,439 people (12.2%) aged 18 to 24, 3,079 people (26.2%) aged 25 to 44, 1,848 people (15.7%) aged 45 to 64, and 879 people (7.5%) who were 65 or older. The median age was 24.6 years. For every 100 females, there were 101.3 males. For every 100 females age 18 and over, there were 96.8 males.

There were 3,193 housing units at an average density of 1,223.5 per square mile, of the occupied units 1,526 (50.6%) were owner-occupied and 1,488 (49.4%) were rented. The homeowner vacancy rate was 2.0%; the rental vacancy rate was 6.2%. 5,909 people (50.2% of the population) lived in owner-occupied housing units and 5,763 people (49.0%) lived in rental housing units.

=== 2000 census ===
At the 2000 census there were 10,297 people in 2,717 households, including 2,208 families, in the city. The population density was 1,649.7/km^{2} (4,273/mi^{2}). There were 2,865 housing units at an average density of 459.0/km^{2} (1,189/mi^{2}). The racial makeup of the city was 44.83% White, 0.57% African American, 1.51% Native American, 1.06% Asian, 0.15% Pacific Islander, 48.27% from other races, and 3.62% from two or more races. Hispanic or Latino of any race were 77.97%.

Of the 2,717 households 53.4% had children under the age of 18 living with them, 57.2% were married couples living together, 17.1% had a female householder with no husband present, and 18.7% were non-families. 15.9% of households were one person and 8.6% were one person aged 65 or older. The average household size was 3.74 and the average family size was 4.16.

The age distribution was 38.0% under the age of 18, 11.4% from 18 to 24, 27.3% from 25 to 44, 14.2% from 45 to 64, and 9.1% 65 or older. The median age was 25 years. For every 100 females, there were 102.6 males. For every 100 females age 18 and over, there were 101.0 males.

The median income for a household in the city was $24,305, and the median family income was $24,934. Males had a median income of $23,645 versus $18,992 for females. The per capita income for the city was $8,230. About 33.3% of families and 39.9% of the population were below the poverty line, including 49.3% of those under age 18 and 12.3% of those age 65 or over.

== Economy ==
Lindsay's economy is primarily agricultural with an emphasis on citrus.

== Arts and culture ==
Lindsay's Mural Tour

== Government ==
=== Local government ===
Its mayor is Misty Villarreal (last elected 2024), Mayor Pro Tempore is Yolanda Flores (last elected 2022). The other city council members are Adriana Nave (last elected 2024), Joe Soria (last elected 2024), and Rosaena Sanchez (last elected 2022).

=== State and federal representation ===
In the California State Legislature, Lindsay is in the 16th senatorial district, represented by Democrat Melissa Hurtado, and in the 33rd Assembly district, represented by Republican Alexandra Macedo.

In the United States House of Representatives, Lindsay is in California's 22nd congressional district, represented by Republican David Valadao.

== Education ==
The city is served by the Lindsay Unified School District.

== Sister cities ==
A sister city agreement was established with Lindsay and * Ono, Japan in 1973, and have since been promoting various exchanges in cultural and industrial fields. The two cities have since cultivated closer ties through various activities with emphasis on human exchange, such as sending and receiving good will missions, exchange students and teachers.
