= Poplar-Cotton Center, California =

Poplar-Cotton Center
- census-designated place
- Location in Tulare County and the state of California

- Location in the United States
- Coordinates: 36°3′14″N 119°8′41″W
- Country: United States
- State: California
- County: Tulare

Area
  - Total: 2.375 sq mi (6.151 km^{2})
  - Land: 2.375 sq mi (6.151 km^{2})
  - Water: 0 sq mi (0 km^{2}) 0%

Population (2020)
  - Total: 2,370
  - Density: 998/sq mi (385/km^{2})
- Time zone: UTC-8 (Pacific (PST))
  - Summer (DST): UTC-7 (PDT)
- ZIP code: 93257
- Area code: 559
- FIPS code: 06-58191

Poplar-Cotton Center is a census-designated place (CDP) in Tulare County, California, United States. The population was 2,370 at the 2020 census, down from 2,470 at the 2010 census.

== Geography ==
Poplar-Cotton Center is located at 36°3′14″N 119°8′41″W (36.053936, -119.144796).

According to the United States Census Bureau, the CDP has a total area of 2.4 square miles (6.2 km^{2}), all land.

== Demographics ==
Historical population
Census	Pop.	Note	%±
1960	1,478		—
1970	1,239		−16.2%
1980	1,295		4.5%
1990	1,901		46.8%
2000	1,496		−21.3%
2010	2,470		65.1%
2020	2,370		−4.0%
U.S. Decennial Census; 1860–1870 1880-1890; 1900 1910 1920; 1930 1940 1950; 1960 1970 1980; 1990 2000 2010

Poplar-Cotton Center was first listed as an unincorporated place under the name Poplar in the 1960 U.S. census; and then as a census designated place under the name Poplar-Cotton Center in the 1980 U.S. census.

=== 2020 census ===
As of the 2020 census, Poplar-Cotton Center had a population of 2,370. The population density was 997.9 inhabitants per square mile (385.3/km^{2}). The median age was 29.6 years. 31.2% of residents were under the age of 18 and 12.3% were 65 years of age or older. For every 100 females, there were 100.7 males, and for every 100 females age 18 and over, there were 100.6 males.

The census reported that 99.6% of the population lived in households, 0.4% lived in non-institutionalized group quarters, and no one was institutionalized. 0.0% of residents lived in urban areas, while 100.0% lived in rural areas.

There were 609 households, of which 47.6% had children under the age of 18 living in them. Of all households, 52.1% were married-couple households, 8.7% were cohabiting couple households, 23.2% had a female householder with no partner present, and 16.1% had a male householder with no partner present. 10.3% of households were one person, and 6.2% had someone living alone who was 65 years of age or older. The average household size was 3.88. There were 510 families (83.7% of all households).

There were 651 housing units at an average density of 274.1 units per square mile (105.8 units/km^{2}), of which 93.5% were occupied. Of occupied units, 46.3% were owner-occupied and 53.7% were occupied by renters. 6.5% of housing units were vacant. The homeowner vacancy rate was 1.1% and the rental vacancy rate was 3.5%.

Racial composition as of the 2020 census
Race	Number	Percent
White	860	36.3%
Black or African American	7	0.3%
American Indian and Alaska Native	43	1.8%
Asian	316	13.3%
Native Hawaiian and Other Pacific Islander	5	0.2%
Some other race	810	34.2%
Two or more races	329	13.9%
Hispanic or Latino (of any race)	1,780	75.1%

=== Income and poverty ===
In 2023, the US Census Bureau estimated that the median household income was $51,893, and the per capita income was $17,452. About 21.0% of families and 27.0% of the population were below the poverty line.

=== 2010 census ===
The 2010 United States census reported that Poplar-Cotton Center had a population of 2,470. The population density was 1,924.6 inhabitants per square mile (743.1/km^{2}). The racial makeup of Poplar was 1,729 (70.0%) White, 1 (0.0%) African American, 15 (0.6%) Native American, 356 (14.4%) Asian, 0 (0.0%) Pacific Islander, 327 (13.2%) from other races, and 42 (1.7%) from two or more races. Hispanic or Latino of any race were 1,809 persons (73.2%).

The Census reported that 2,470 people (100% of the population) lived in households, 0 (0%) lived in non-institutionalized group quarters, and 0 (0%) were institutionalized.

There were 576 households, out of which 366 (63.5%) had children under the age of 18 living in them, 308 (53.5%) were opposite-sex married couples living together, 121 (21.0%) had a female householder with no husband present, 77 (13.4%) had a male householder with no wife present. There were 76 (13.2%) unmarried opposite-sex partnerships, and 9 (1.6%) same-sex married couples or partnerships. 48 households (8.3%) were made up of individuals, and 27 (4.7%) had someone living alone who was 65 years of age or older. The average household size was 4.29. There were 506 families (87.8% of all households); the average family size was 4.48.

The population was spread out, with 958 people (38.8%) under the age of 18, 285 people (11.5%) aged 18 to 24, 616 people (24.9%) aged 25 to 44, 411 people (16.6%) aged 45 to 64, and 200 people (8.1%) who were 65 years of age or older. The median age was 24.8 years. For every 100 females, there were 104.3 males. For every 100 females age 18 and over, there were 100.5 males.

There were 611 housing units at an average density of 476.1 per square mile (183.8/km^{2}), of which 262 (45.5%) were owner-occupied, and 314 (54.5%) were occupied by renters. The homeowner vacancy rate was 1.9%; the rental vacancy rate was 5.1%. 1,132 people (45.8% of the population) lived in owner-occupied housing units and 1,338 people (54.2%) lived in rental housing units.

== Politics ==
In the state legislature, Poplar-Cotton Center is located in the 16th senatorial district, represented by Democrat Melissa Hurtado, and in the 33rd Assembly district, represented by Republican Alexandra Macedo.

In the United States House of Representatives, Poplar-Cotton Center is in California's 22nd congressional district, represented by Republican David Valadao.

== Education ==
Most of the CDP is served by the Pleasant View Elementary School District, while a part of it is within the Woodville Elementary School District. All of it is served by the Porterville Unified School District for grades 9–12.
