= California State Route 43 =

Highway in California

State Route 43

- SR 43 highlighted in red

Route information
- Maintained by Caltrans
- Length: 98 mi (158 km)

Major junctions
- South end: SR 119 near Taft
- I-5 near Taft; SR 58 near Bakersfield; SR 46 in Wasco; SR 137 near Corcoran; SR 198 near Hanford
- North end: SR 99 in Selma

Location
- Country: United States
- State: California
- Counties: Kern, Tulare, Kings, Fresno

Highway system
- State highways in California; Interstate; US; State; Scenic; History; Pre‑1964; Unconstructed; Deleted; Freeways
← SR 42	→ SR 44

State Route 43 (SR 43) is a north–south state highway in the U.S. State of California, routed along the southern San Joaquin Valley between SR 119 southwest of Bakersfield and SR 99 in Selma. SR 43 runs roughly parallel to SR 99, connecting the towns of Shafter, Wasco, Corcoran, Hanford, and Selma.

== Route description ==
Route 43 is defined in section 343 of the California Streets and Highways Code. The definition omits the concurrency with Route 46 instead of duplicating that segment in the other route's definition in the code:

Route 43 is from:
(a) Route 119 to Route 46 in Wasco.
(b) Route 46 in Wasco to Route 99 near Selma.

SR 43 begins southwest of Bakersfield at the SR 119 junction as Enos Lane. It travels north on Enos Lane through rural farmland and a local raceway as SR 43 quickly crosses I-5. It continues north for a few miles before reaching SR 58. Then, after a mile after intersecting 7th Standard Road, the road name changes to Beech Avenue. At the intersection of Los Angeles Street, Beech Avenue, and Santa Fe Way, SR 43 angles northwest, running parallel to the BNSF tracks. At this point the name changes to Central Valley Highway. Before intersecting Lerdo Highway, which serves Minter Field, the road expands to four lanes. As SR 43 goes through Shafter, the highway continues as a four-lane divided highway until reaching Wasco at Poso Drive, where it returns to two lanes. The name now changes to F Street. After intersecting SR 46, SR 43 briefly travels east concurrently with SR 46 before turning north regaining the Central Valley Highway designation. At Pond Street, the route turns northwest. It continues as the route goes through Corcoran, intersecting the western terminus of SR 137 (Whitney Avenue). North of Corcoran, the route turns north splitting off from the BNSF Railway tracks. It continues north through Hanford where it reaches the SR 198 interchange before reaching Selma. SR 43 terminates at SR 99 near the intersection of Highland Avenue and Floral Avenue.

SR 43 is part of the California Freeway and Expressway System, but except for a portion near SR 46, is not part of the National Highway System, a network of highways that are considered essential to the country's economy, defense, and mobility by the Federal Highway Administration.

== History ==
State Route 43 is the combination of two different legislative routes. The northern segment was adopted as a state route in 1933 as Legislative Route 135. It was defined to run from LRN 10 (currently SR 198) near Hanford to LRN 129 (currently SR 65) near Ducor via Corcoran and Earilmart. Originally, the route started in Ducor and traveled west on Ave. 65. It went through Earilmart to Central Valley Highway, where it joins the current route. In 1951, the route and terminus was changed from Ducor to the junction of LRN 33 (currently SR 46) and LRN 139 (current routing of SR 43) in Wasco, eliminating the route along Ave. 56.

In 1959, a second disconnected segment was added that ran from the Kings County Line to LRN 4 (currently SR 99) near Selma. The southern segment was adopted as a state route in 1933 as Legislative Route 139. It was defined to run from LRN 140 (currently SR 119) to LRN 33 in Wasco.

In 1964, all of the state routes were renumbered. LRN 135 and LRN 139 were combined, and all gaps were filled to make one continuous route from SR 119 to SR 99 near Selma. This route was named and signed as SR 43.

== Future ==
The Kings County Association of Governments has plans to improve the state highways within the county. Developers are interested in building distribution warehouses in Kings County because of its strategic location midway between the Los Angeles and San Francisco Bay areas, but they are currently turned off by the lack of freeway access. For SR 43, the plan is to upgrade the entire segment within the county to a freeway. However, Kings County voters have shown little interest in passing any transportation taxes to fund these projects.

== Major intersections ==
Except where prefixed with a letter, postmiles were measured on the road as it was in 1964, based on the alignment that existed at the time, and do not necessarily reflect current mileage. Postmile prefixes include: R reflecting a realignment in the route since then, M indicating a second realignment, L referring to an overlap due to a correction or change, and T indicating postmiles classified as temporary. Segments that remain unconstructed or have been relinquished to local control may be omitted. The numbers reset at county lines; the start and end postmiles in each county are given in the county column.

County	Location	Postmile	Destinations	Notes
Kern; KER 0.11-38.81		0.11	Enos Lane	Continuation beyond SR 119
Kern; KER 0.11-38.81		0.11	SR 119 (Taft Highway) – Taft	South end of SR 43; former US 399
Kern; KER 0.11-38.81		1.90	I-5 (West Side Freeway) – Sacramento, Los Angeles	Interchange; I-5 exit 246
Kern; KER 0.11-38.81		6.11	SR 58 (Stockdale Highway) to I-5 north – Bakersfield	Roundabout
Kern; KER 0.11-38.81		8.11	Rosedale Highway, Sidding Road – Bakersfield	Former south end of SR 58 overlap; former SR 58 east
Kern; KER 0.11-38.81		9.16	Hageman Road to I-5 – Buttonwillow, McKittrick	Former north end of SR 58 overlap; former SR 58 west
Kern; KER 0.11-38.81	Wasco	R25.13 50.90 (Note: Indicates that the postmile represents the distance along SR 46 rather than SR 43.)	SR 46 west to I-5 north / F Street – Lost Hills, Paso Robles	South end of SR 46 overlap; SR 46 is former US 466 west
Kern; KER 0.11-38.81	Wasco	51.22 25.19	SR 46 east to SR 99 / J Street	North end of SR 46 overlap; SR 46 is former US 466 east
Tulare; TUL 0.00-22.57		7.76	Avenue 56 (CR J22) – Earlimart, Alpaugh	
Tulare; TUL 0.00-22.57		R15.93	Avenue 112 (CR J33) – Alpaugh	Northern terminus of CR J33
Kings; KIN 0.00-27.29	Corcoran	1.46	SR 137 east (Whitley Avenue) – Tulare, Corcoran	Roundabout; western terminus of SR 137
Kings; KIN 0.00-27.29	Hanford	18.24	SR 198 – Hanford, Visalia	Interchange; SR 198 exit 89
Fresno; FRE 0.00-9.31	Selma	9.31	SR 99 – Fresno, Bakersfield, Los Angeles	Interchange; north end of SR 43; SR 99 exit 118
Fresno; FRE 0.00-9.31	Selma	9.31	Highland Avenue	Continuation beyond SR 99
1.000 mi = 1.609 km; 1.000 km = 0.621 mi: Concurrency terminus

== See also ==
- List of state highways in California
