= California State Route 63 =

Highway in California

State Route 63

- SR 63 highlighted in red

Route information
- Maintained by Caltrans
- Length: 38.043 mi (61.224 km) SR 63 is broken into pieces, and the length does not reflect the SR 198 overlap that would be required to make the route continuous.

Major junctions
- South end: SR 137 in Tulare
- SR 198 in Visalia; SR 201 near Orosi
- North end: SR 180 near Yokuts Valley

Location
- Country: United States
- State: California
- Counties: Tulare, Fresno

Highway system
- State highways in California; Interstate; US; State; Scenic; History; Pre‑1964; Unconstructed; Deleted; Freeways
← SR 62	→ SR 64

State Route 63 (SR 63) is a north–south state highway in the U.S. state of California in the Central Valley. It begins from near Tulare at Route 137, runs north through the city of Visalia and the towns of Cutler and Orosi, before ending 8 miles (13 km) north of Orange Cove, where it reaches its northern terminus at Route 180, roughly 2 and 1/2 miles southwest of the town of Yokuts Valley. State Route 63 runs concurrent with Route 198 within Visalia.

== Route description ==
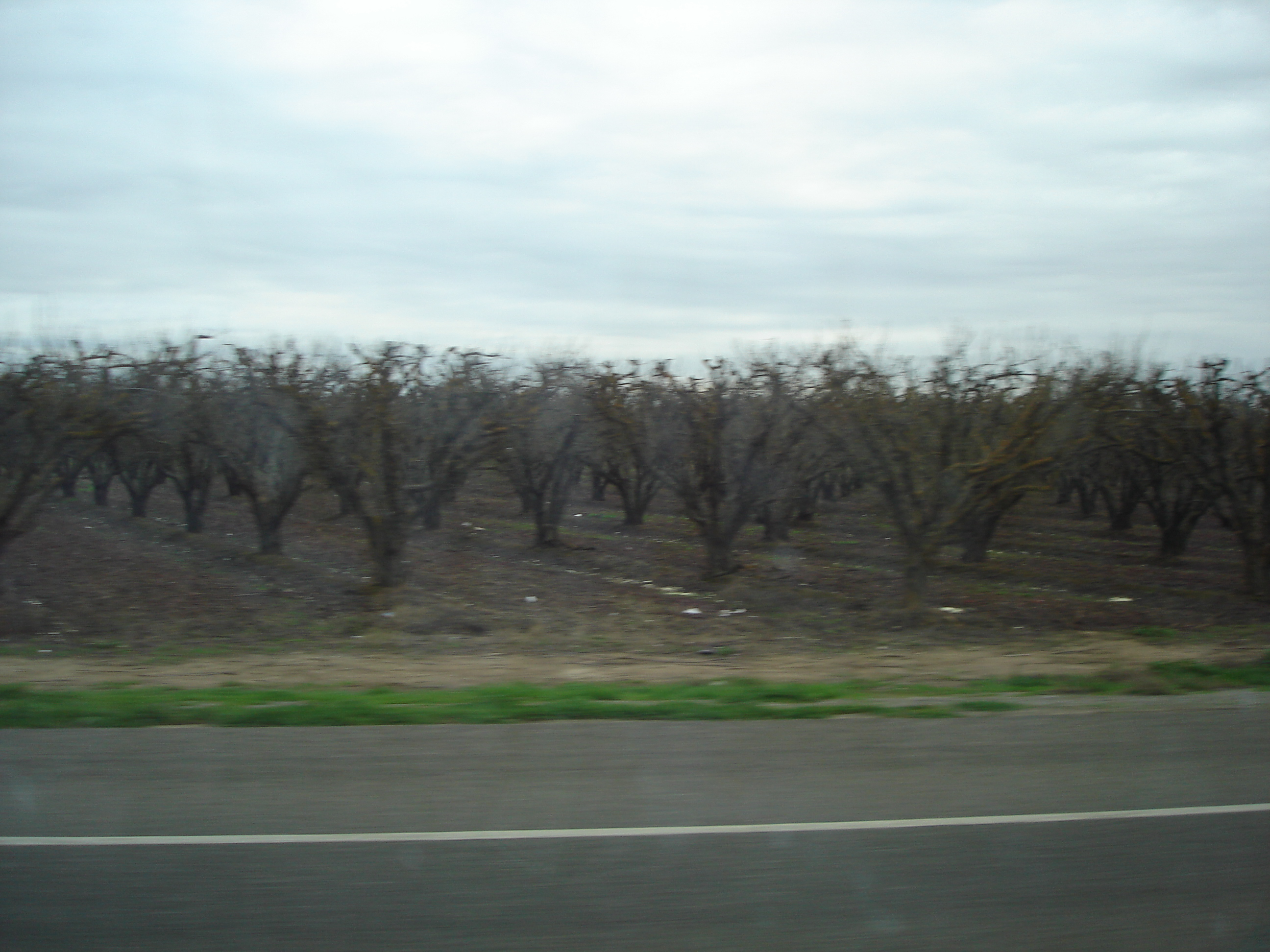
SR 63 near Visalia

Route 63 is defined in section 363 of the California Streets and Highways Code. The definition omits the concurrency with Route 198 instead of duplicating that segment in the other route's definition in the code:

Route 63 is from:
(a) Route 137 near Tulare to Route 198.
(b) Route 198 to Route 180 via the vicinity of Orosi and Orange Cove.

SR 63 begins in the city of Tulare at an intersection with SR 137. It travels due north as Mooney Boulevard before leaving the Tulare city limits. The highway soon enters Visalia, intersecting CR J30 and passing through to the SR 198 freeway, where SR 63 merges with the freeway heading eastbound until the next exit. Following this, SR 63 turns north as a one-way couplet with Locust Street for southbound traffic and Court Street for northbound traffic. SR 63 intersects with CR J32 in downtown Visalia before turning northwest on NW 2nd Avenue and NW 3rd Avenue. North of downtown, NW 2nd Avenue and NW 3rd Avenue merge and become Dinuba Boulevard, and SR 63 continues north out of Visalia.

SR 63 continues north as Road 124, intersecting CR J34 and passing by Sequoia Field Airport. The road makes a small bend to the east, running concurrently with SR 201 briefly as Road 128 in the town of Calgro. SR 63 continues through Cutler and Orosi before intersecting CR J19 and traveling west on Avenue 460 for two blocks before continuing north at the city of Orange Cove as Hills Valley Road. After a few curves in the road, SR 63 ends at SR 180.

SR 63 is part of the California Freeway and Expressway System, and south of the northern Visalia city limits is part of the National Highway System, a network of highways that are considered essential to the country's economy, defense, and mobility by the Federal Highway Administration.

== History ==
In 1963, portions of SR 63 through Visalia were reconstructed as a one-way pair between Mineral King Avenue and Sweet Avenue.

== Major intersections ==
Except where prefixed with a letter, postmiles were measured on the road as it was in 1964, based on the alignment that existed at the time, and do not necessarily reflect current mileage. Postmile prefixes include: R reflecting a realignment in the route since then, M indicating a second realignment, L referring to an overlap due to a correction or change, and T indicating postmiles classified as temporary. Segments that remain unconstructed or have been relinquished to local control may be omitted. The numbers reset at county lines; the start and end postmiles in each county are given in the county column.

County	Location	Postmile	Destinations	Notes
Tulare; TUL 0.00-R30.08	Tulare	0.00	Mooney Boulevard	Continuation beyond SR 137
Tulare; TUL 0.00-R30.08	Tulare	0.00	SR 137 (Tulare Avenue) to SR 99	South end of SR 63
Tulare; TUL 0.00-R30.08	Tulare	1.00	Prosperity Avenue to SR 99	
Tulare; TUL 0.00-R30.08	Visalia	6.01	Caldwell Avenue (CR J30)	
Tulare; TUL 0.00-R30.08	Visalia	L7.97 R8.75 (Note: Indicates that the postmile represents the distance along SR 198 rather than SR 63.)	SR 198 west (Sequoia Freeway) / Mooney Boulevard	Interchange; south end of SR 198 overlap; SR 198 east exit 105B
Tulare; TUL 0.00-R30.08	Visalia	L7.97 R8.75	South end of freeway on SR 198	
Tulare; TUL 0.00-R30.08	Visalia	R9.97 7.98	North end of freeway on SR 198	
Tulare; TUL 0.00-R30.08	Visalia	R9.97 7.98	SR 198 east (Sequoia Freeway) / Locust Street – Lemon Cove, Sequoia Park	Interchange; north end of SR 198 overlap; SR 198 west exit 107A
Tulare; TUL 0.00-R30.08	Visalia		Murray Avenue (CR J32)	
Tulare; TUL 0.00-R30.08	Visalia	R9.10	Houston Avenue (CR J15) to SR 216	
Tulare; TUL 0.00-R30.08		12.13	Avenue 328 (CR J34) – Ivanhoe, Woodlake	
Tulare; TUL 0.00-R30.08		R19.19	SR 201 east (Avenue 384, CR J38) – Yettem, Woodlake, Dinuba	South end of SR 201 overlap
Tulare; TUL 0.00-R30.08		21.57	SR 201 west (Avenue 400) – Kingsburg	North end of SR 201 overlap
Tulare; TUL 0.00-R30.08	Orosi	23.57	El Monte Way (CR J40)	
Fresno; FRE 0.00-8.36	Orange Cove	0.00	Hills Valley Road (CR J19) / Park Boulevard – Orange Cove	
Fresno; FRE 0.00-8.36		8.36	SR 180 (Kings Canyon Road) – Kings Canyon Park, Fresno	North end of SR 63
1.000 mi = 1.609 km; 1.000 km = 0.621 mi: Concurrency terminus
