= California State Route 270 =

State highway in Mono County, California, United States

State Route 270
- Bodie Road
- SR 270 highlighted in red

Route information
- Maintained by Caltrans and California State Parks
- Length: 9.805 mi (15.780 km)

Major junctions
- West end: US 395 near Bridgeport
- East end: Bodie

Location
- Country: United States
- State: California
- Counties: Mono

Highway system
- State highways in California; Interstate; US; State; Scenic; History; Pre‑1964; Unconstructed; Deleted; Freeways
← SR 269	→ SR 271

State Route 270 (SR 270), also known as Bodie Road, is a state highway in the U.S. state of California. It is a spur route off of U.S. Route 395 south of Bridgeport in Mono County, leading into Bodie State Historic Park. While some maps may show the highway extending inside the park, this segment is unpaved and maintained by California State Parks, and is not included in the state route logs.

== Route description ==
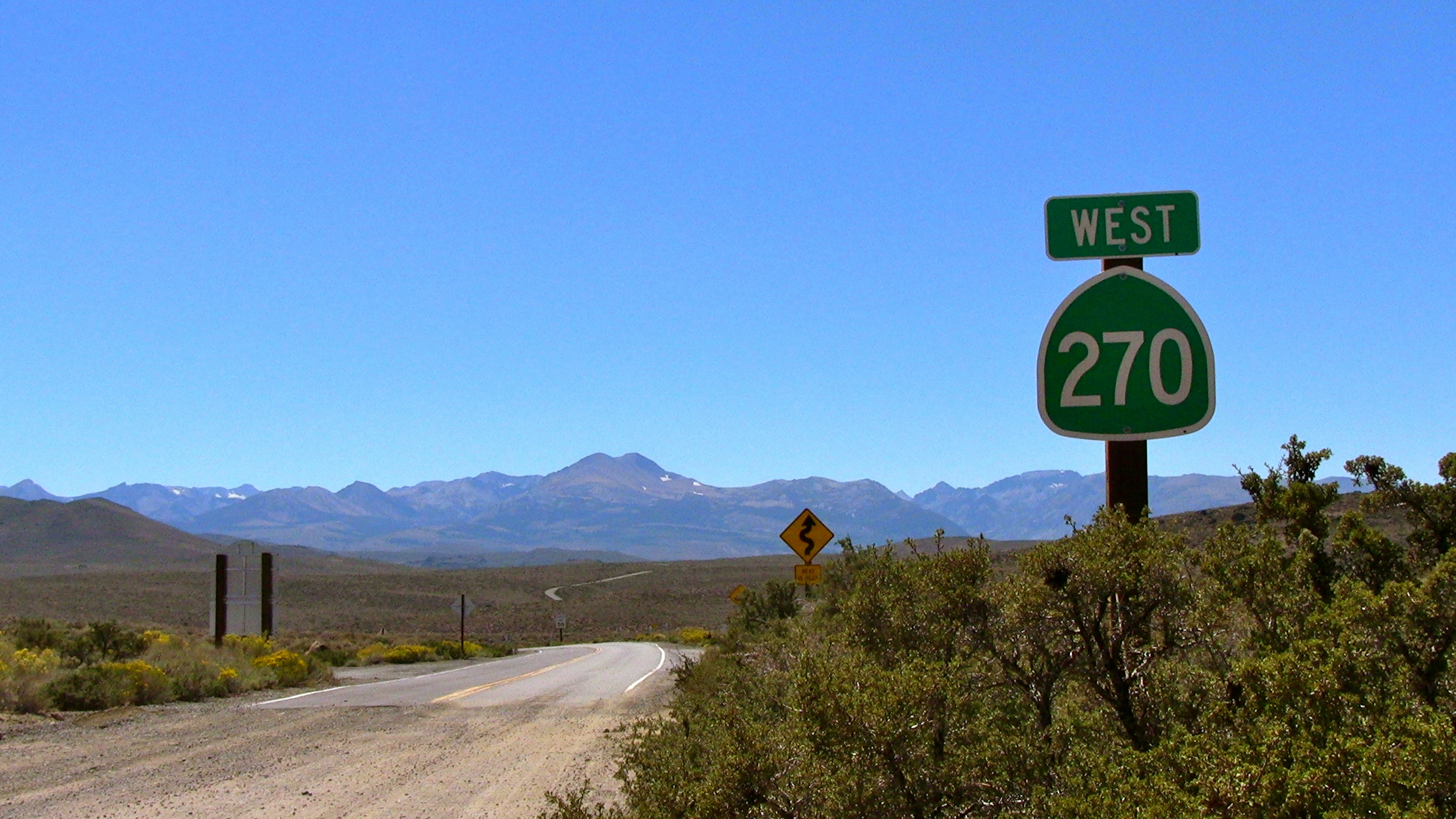
Looking west toward the Sierra Nevada on Hwy 270 outside Bodie, 2012

Route 270 is defined in section 570 of the California Streets and Highways Code, and that the highway is "from Route 395 south of Bridgeport to Bodie State Historic Park".

Running east from U.S. Route 395, SR 270 serves as the gateway to Bodie State Historic Park. About 3.5 miles (5.6 km) before entering the park, the road becomes unpaved, and is maintained by the California Department of Parks and Recreation (California State Parks) instead of Caltrans. Like the historical buildings inside the park, the dirt roads are preserved to resemble how Brodie looked during late 19th Century when it was a booming mining town. Caltrans District 9 has recommended that the 3.5-mile (5.6 km) dirt road segment outside the park should be officially deleted from the state highway system if California State Parks wants to continue maintaining it.

SR 270 is not part of the National Highway System, a network of highways that are considered essential to the country's economy, defense, and mobility by the Federal Highway Administration.

== Major intersections ==
Except where prefixed with a letter, postmiles were measured on the road as it was in 1964, based on the alignment that existed at the time, and do not necessarily reflect current mileage. Postmile prefixes include: R reflecting a realignment in the route since then, M indicating a second realignment, L referring to an overlap due to a correction or change, and T indicating postmiles classified as temporary. Segments that remain unconstructed or have been relinquished to local control may be omitted. The entire route is in Mono County.

Location	Postmile	Destinations	Notes
	0.00	US 395 – Lee Vining, Bridgeport	West end of SR 270
	9.81 0 (Note: Indicates that the mileage represents the distance along the unpaved route maintained by California State Parks)	East end of Caltrans maintenance; west end of unpaved segment maintained by California State Parks	
Bodie	3.5	Bodie State Historic Park entrance	East end of route
1.000 mi = 1.609 km; 1.000 km = 0.621 mi
