= California State Route 201 =

Highway in California

State Route 201

- Map of central California with SR 201 highlighted in red

Route information
- Maintained by Caltrans
- Length: 25.30 mi (40.72 km)
- Existed: 1933–present

Major junctions
- West end: SR 99 in Kingsburg
- SR 63 near Calgro
- East end: SR 245 at Elderwood

Location
- Country: United States
- State: California
- Counties: Fresno, Tulare

Highway system
- State highways in California; Interstate; US; State; Scenic; History; Pre‑1964; Unconstructed; Deleted; Freeways
← SR 200	→ SR 202

State Route 201 (SR 201) is a state highway in the U.S. state of California that serves Fresno and Tulare counties in the Central Valley. It connects State Route 99 in Kingsburg with State Route 245 at Elderwood. State Route 201 forms a short concurrency with State Route 63 near Calgro.

== Route description ==
Route 201 is defined in section 501, subsection (a), of the California Streets and Highways Code:

Route 201 is from:
(1) Route 99 near Kingsburg easterly to Route 63.
(2) Route 63 easterly to Route 245.

The definition omits the concurrency with Route 63 instead of duplicating that segment in the other route's definition in the code. In addition, subdivision (b) permits the state to relinquish control of the portion of Route 201 located within Kingsburg to the city.

SR 201 begins at State Route 99 in Kingsburg, Fresno County with an interchange. It then exits the county and enters Tulare County, where it meets County Route J31 and County Route J19. It then meets State Route 63 for a short concurrency. Upon leaving, it intersects County Route J15 and County Route J23 before meeting its east end at State Route 245 in Elderwood.

SR 201 is not part of the National Highway System, a network of highways that are considered essential to the country's economy, defense, and mobility by the Federal Highway Administration.

== Major intersections ==
Except where prefixed with a letter, postmiles were measured on the road as it was in 1964, based on the alignment that existed at the time, and do not necessarily reflect current mileage. Postmile prefixes include: R reflecting a realignment in the route since then, M indicating a second realignment, L referring to an overlap due to a correction or change, and T indicating postmiles classified as temporary. Segments that remain unconstructed or have been relinquished to local control may be omitted. The numbers reset at county lines; the start and end postmiles in each county are given in the county column.

County	Location	Postmile	Destinations	Notes
Fresno; FRE 0.00-1.34	Kingsburg	0.00	Sierra Street	Continuation beyond SR 99
Fresno; FRE 0.00-1.34	Kingsburg	0.00	SR 99 – Fresno, Los Angeles	Interchange; west end of SR 201; former US 99; SR 99 exit 112
Tulare; TUL 0.00-23.96		4.94	Road 56 (CR J31) – Reedley	
Tulare; TUL 0.00-23.96		7.95	Road 80 (CR J19) – Dinuba	
Tulare; TUL 0.00-23.96		13.97 21.57 (Note: Indicates that the postmile represents the distance along SR 63 rather than SR 201.)	SR 63 north (Road 128) / Avenue 400 – Cutler, Orosi	West end of SR 63 overlap
Tulare; TUL 0.00-23.96		19.19 13.98	SR 63 south (Road 128) / Avenue 384 (CR J38) – Visalia	East end of SR 63 overlap; eastern terminus of CR J38
Tulare; TUL 0.00-23.96		14.50	Road 132 (CR J15) – Visalia	Northern terminus of CR J15
Tulare; TUL 0.00-23.96	Seville	17.50	Road 156 (CR J23) – Ivanhoe	Northern terminus of CR J23
Tulare; TUL 0.00-23.96	Elderwood	23.95	SR 245 (Millwood Drive) – Pinehurst, Woodlake	East end of SR 201
Tulare; TUL 0.00-23.96	Elderwood	23.95	Avenue 376	Continuation beyond SR 245
1.000 mi = 1.609 km; 1.000 km = 0.621 mi: Concurrency terminus
