= California State Route 245 =

Highway in California

State Route 245

- SR 245 highlighted in red

Route information
- Maintained by Caltrans
- Length: 42 mi (68 km)
- Existed: 1972–present

Major junctions
- South end: SR 198 near Exeter
- SR 216 in Woodlake; SR 201 in Elderwood
- North end: SR 180 near Dunlap

Location
- Country: United States
- State: California
- Counties: Tulare, Fresno

Highway system
- State highways in California; Interstate; US; State; Scenic; History; Pre‑1964; Unconstructed; Deleted; Freeways
← SR 244	→ SR 246

State Route 245 (SR 245) is a north–south state highway in the U.S. state of California that runs from near Exeter to near Kings Canyon National Park. It connects State Route 198 in Tulare County to State Route 180 in Fresno County. It runs through the city of Woodlake and the small unincorporated towns of Elderwood, Badger, and Pinehurst. Roughly 95 percent of SR 245 traverses rural areas. North of Avenue 364 in Tulare County, SR 245 is synonymous with Millwood Drive.

== Route description ==
Route 245 is defined in section 545 of the California Streets and Highways Code, and that the highway is "from Route 198 to Route 180 near the General Grant Grove section of Kings Canyon National Park".

The route begins at State Route 198 in Tulare County. It then heads north and intersects State Route 216 in Woodlake and County Route J27 amid farmland in the county. The route continues to meet State Route 201 in Elderwood. After several miles through Tulare County, it crosses into Fresno County, where it meets its north end at State Route 180, west of the entrance to the General Grant Grove section of Kings Canyon National Park.

SR 245 is not part of the National Highway System, a network of highways that are considered essential to the country's economy, defense, and mobility by the Federal Highway Administration.

== History ==
State Route 245
- Location: Los Angeles
- Existed: 1963–1965

State Route 69
- Location: Exeter–Dunlap
- Existed: 1964–1972

From 1963 to 1965, Route 245 was originally defined to run from Interstate 5 to SR 60 in the Los Angeles area, as a temporary route during construction in Downtown Los Angeles.

Present-day SR 245 was originally numbered Route 69 during the 1964 renumbering. SR 69 was then renumbered to SR 245 in 1972 due to the continual theft of SR 69 signs.

== Major intersections ==
Except where prefixed with a letter, postmiles were measured on the road as it was in 1964, based on the alignment of State Route 69 as it existed at that time, and do not necessarily reflect current mileage. Postmile prefixes include: R reflecting a realignment in the route since then, M indicating a second realignment, L referring to an overlap due to a correction or change, and T indicating postmiles classified as temporary. Segments that remain unconstructed or have been relinquished to local control may be omitted. The numbers reset at county lines; the start and end postmiles in each county are given in the county column.

County	Location	Postmile	Destinations	Notes
Tulare; TUL 0.00–33.04		0.00	SR 198 / Road 204 – Sequoia Park, Visalia	South end of SR 245
Tulare; TUL 0.00–33.04	Woodlake	7.07	SR 216 (Naranjo Boulevard)	Roundabout
Tulare; TUL 0.00–33.04		10.47	Millwood Drive (CR J27) / Avenue 364 – Visalia	Northern terminus of CR J27
Tulare; TUL 0.00–33.04	Elderwood	12.00	SR 201 west (Avenue 376) – Kingsburg	Eastern terminus of SR 201
Tulare; TUL 0.00–33.04		19.29	Boyd Drive – Orosi	
Tulare; TUL 0.00–33.04		30.01	Dry Creek Drive (CR J21)	Northern terminus of CR J21
Fresno; FRE 0.00–8.97		8.97	SR 180 – Fresno, Kings Canyon Park	North end of SR 245
1.000 mi = 1.609 km; 1.000 km = 0.621 mi
