= California State Route 137 =

Highway in California

State Route 137

- Map of central California with SR 137 highlighted in red

Route information
- Maintained by Caltrans
- Length: 29 mi (47 km)

Major junctions
- West end: SR 43 near Corcoran
- SR 99 in Tulare
- East end: SR 65 in Cairns Corner

Location
- Country: United States
- State: California
- Counties: Kings, Tulare

Highway system
- State highways in California; Interstate; US; State; Scenic; History; Pre‑1964; Unconstructed; Deleted; Freeways
← SR 136	→ SR 138

State Route 137 (SR 137) is a state highway in the U.S. state of California, running in the San Joaquin Valley from State Route 43 near Corcoran to State Route 65 in Cairns Corner.

== Route description ==
Route 137 is defined in section 437 of the California Streets and Highways Code, and that the highway is "from Route 43 near Corcoran to Route 65 near Lindsay via Tulare".

The western terminus of SR 137 is at an intersection with SR 43 in Corcoran. SR 137 travels east as Whitley Avenue before turning due north as 4th Avenue, which turns into Road 16, and entering Tulare County. The route turns northeast onto Waukena Avenue before passing through the community of Waukena. After this, SR 137 turns north onto Road 30 and then east on Avenue 199 before making another turn north on Road 36. A few miles later, SR 137 makes a final turn east on Avenue 228, which turns into Inyo Avenue. SR 137 continues into the city of Tulare, turning north on M Street and east onto Tulare Avenue as the highway passes through downtown.

SR 137 intersects State Route 99 and the south end of State Route 63 while still in the Tulare city limits. The highway then leaves the city limits and passes through rural Tulare County. The eastern terminus is just west of Lindsay at SR 65.

SR 137 is part of the California Freeway and Expressway System, but is not part of the National Highway System, a network of highways that are considered essential to the country's economy, defense, and mobility by the Federal Highway Administration.

== Major intersections ==
Except where prefixed with a letter, postmiles were measured on the road as it was in 1964, based on the alignment that existed at the time, and do not necessarily reflect current mileage. Postmile prefixes include: R reflecting a realignment in the route since then, M indicating a second realignment, L referring to an overlap due to a correction or change, and T indicating postmiles classified as temporary. Segments that remain unconstructed or have been relinquished to local control may be omitted. The numbers reset at county lines; the start and end postmiles in each county are given in the county column.

County	Location	Postmile	Destinations	Notes
Kings; KIN 0.00-2.06		0.00	Whitley Avenue – Corcoran	Continuation beyond SR 43
Kings; KIN 0.00-2.06		0.00	SR 43 (Central Valley Highway) – Hanford, Wasco	Roundabout; west end of SR 137
Tulare; TUL 0.00-27.40	Tulare	16.12	Cherry Street	Serves Adventist Health Tulare
Tulare; TUL 0.00-27.40	Tulare	16.63	SR 99 – Sacramento, Los Angeles	Interchange; SR 99 exit 87
Tulare; TUL 0.00-27.40	Tulare	17.51	SR 63 north (Mooney Boulevard) – Visalia	Southern terminus of SR 63
Tulare; TUL 0.00-27.40		20.46	Road 140 (CR J15 north) – Visalia	West end of CR J15 overlap
Tulare; TUL 0.00-27.40		21.96	Road 152 (CR J15 south) – Woodville	East end of CR J15 overlap
Tulare; TUL 0.00-27.40		23.90	Road 168 (CR J23) – Farmersville	Southern terminus of CR J23
Tulare; TUL 0.00-27.40		27.40	SR 65 (Road 196 / CR J27) – Exeter, Lindsay, Plainview	East end of SR 137
1.000 mi = 1.609 km; 1.000 km = 0.621 mi: Concurrency terminus
