= California State Route 198 =

Highway in California

State Route 198
- SR 198 highlighted in red

Route information
- Maintained by Caltrans
- Length: 141.273 mi (227.357 km) (plus about 8.5 mi (14 km) on SR 33)

Major junctions
- West end: US 101 near San Lucas
- SR 25 in San Lucas; SR 33 in Coalinga; I-5 near Coalinga; SR 41 in Lemoore; SR 43 near Hanford; SR 99 in Visalia; SR 63 in Visalia; SR 65 near Exeter; SR 216 near Lemon Cove
- East end: Generals Highway in Sequoia National Park

Location
- Country: United States
- State: California
- Counties: Monterey, Fresno, Kings, Tulare

Highway system
- State highways in California; Interstate; US; State; Scenic; History; Pre‑1964; Unconstructed; Deleted; Freeways
← SR 197	→ US 199

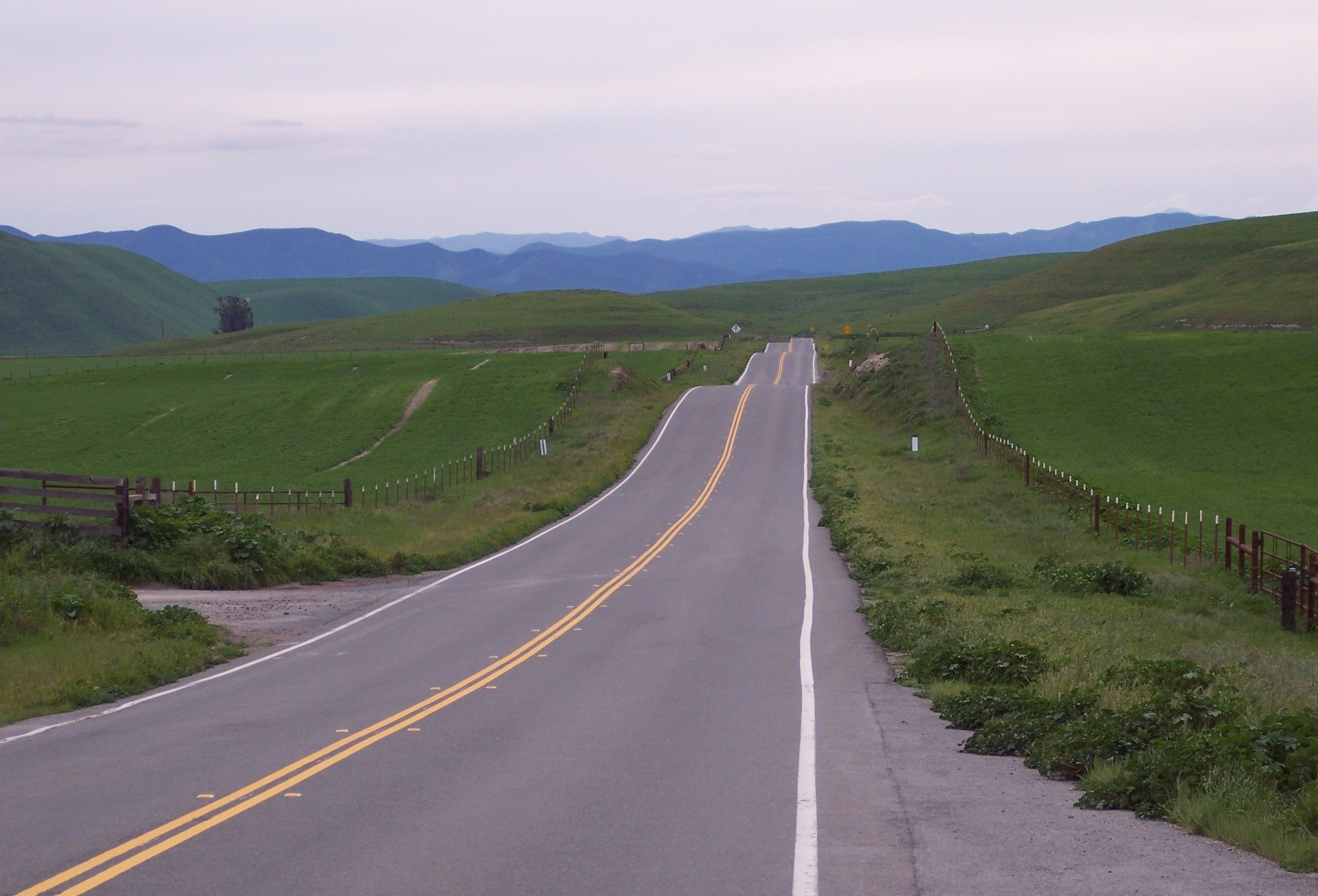
SR 198 between San Lucas and Coalinga

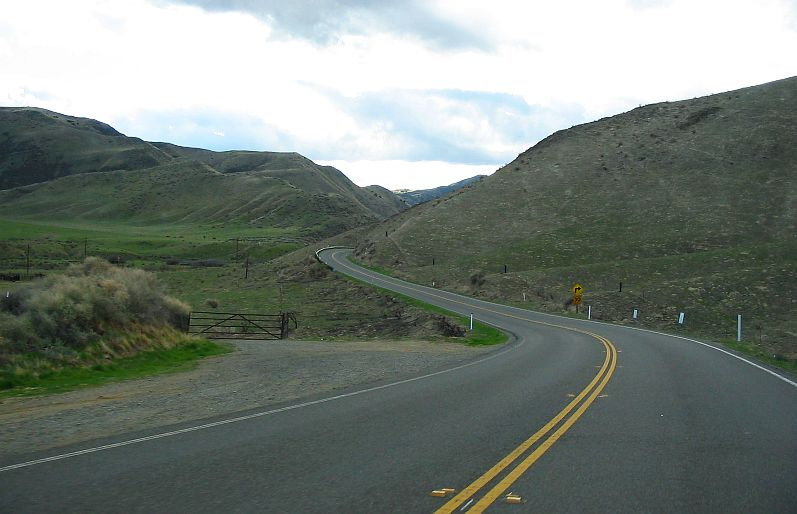
Looking west on Route 198 a few miles west of Coalinga, California

State Route 198 (SR 198) is an east–west state highway in the U.S. state of California that runs from U.S. Route 101 (US 101) south of King City to Generals Highway in Sequoia National Park. It connects the California Central Coast to the mid–Central Valley through Hanford and Visalia, although the most developed portion is in the Central Valley itself. SR 198 intersects the major north–south routes in the Central Valley, including Interstate 5 (I-5), SR 33, and SR 99.

The highway that would become SR 198 was approved for construction in the 1910s through three bond issues, and was added to the state highway system in 1934. Parts of the highway were upgraded to freeway during the 1960s. Another portion was converted to an expressway in between Hanford and Visalia, and was completed in late 2012.

== Route description ==
Route 198 is defined in section 498 of the California Streets and Highways Code. The definition omits the concurrency with Route 33 instead of duplicating that segment in the other route's definition in the code:

Route 198 is from:
(a) Route 101 near San Lucas to Route 33 at Coalinga.
(b) Route 33 near Oilfields to Route 99 via Hanford.
(c) Route 99 to the Sequoia National Park line via Visalia.

The road begins at a remote interchange with US 101 near San Lucas south of King City in the Salinas River Valley. Leaving US 101, SR 198 passes through the Priest Valley, climbs the Diablo Range as a two-lane road and crosses over an unnamed pass. It then descends along Warthan Canyon to the town of Coalinga in the agricultural Central Valley, where it briefly runs concurrently with SR 33 and crosses the Anticline Ridge. On both sides of Coalinga the road passes through the enormous Coalinga Oil Field.

SR 198 then intersects Interstate 5 (I-5) in Fresno County near the Harris Ranch Airport before becoming a freeway west of Lemoore. The landscape becomes a bit less rural as it goes through Hanford and passes near the Hanford Municipal Airport, where it continues as a four-lane expressway from the intersection with SR 43 until SR 198 encounters a freeway-to-freeway interchange with SR 99 as it enters Visalia, the largest city it passes through, and goes by the Visalia Municipal Airport. It remains a freeway until east of Visalia, intersecting SR 65 and passing by College of the Sequoias. SR 198 starts to climb the forested Sierra Nevada and ends at the Sequoia National Park boundary, near Lake Kaweah, where the road continues through the park as the Generals Highway. This is one of the main routes providing access to Sequoia National Park, the other being SR 180 to the north. Although some commercially produced maps may show the Generals Highway as part of SR 198, routes inside the park are federally maintained and are not included in the state route logs

SR 198 is part of the California Freeway and Expressway System, and east of I-5 is part of the National Highway System, a network of highways that are considered essential to the country's economy, defense, and mobility by the Federal Highway Administration. SR 198 is eligible to be included in the State Scenic Highway System, but it is not officially designated as a scenic highway by the California Department of Transportation (Caltrans).

== History ==
All of SR 198 was added to the state highway system in the three bond issues floated to pay for the construction of the system. The first bond issue, approved by the state's voters in 1910, included the road from Visalia west to Hanford, connecting the two county seats with the central north–south highway (Route 4, now SR 99). As part of the 1916 bond issue, the route was extended west from Hanford through Coalinga to the coast trunk highway (Route 2, now US 101) near San Lucas, and assigned it the Route 10 designation. The third bond issue, passed in 1919, included a further extension east from Visalia to Sequoia National Park. The entire length of Route 10 was marked as Sign Route 198 in 1934. This number was adopted legislatively in the 1964 renumbering. The portion east of Interstate 5 near Coalinga was added to the California Freeway and Expressway System in 1959, and parts of it have been built as such.

As early as 1938, Visalia identified the need for a highway through the city. Due to congestion along SR 198 through Visalia, the California Highway Commission announced in June 1950 plans to convert Mineral King Avenue into a limited-access freeway. After objection from the Visalia city council over the width of the right-of-way, the state temporarily halted its plans. In December 1950, the California Highway Commission condemned a Safeway store under construction in the proposed right-of-way, signaling that the state was continuing with its plans despite the city's objections. Over the next few years, the state continued acquiring property in the city. By 1956, the condemnations had affected roughly 180 people. In October 1956, the California legislature approved $1.1 million (equivalent to $13 million in 2025) toward building a four-lane divided highway way along SR 198, beginning with a 4.1-mile (6.6 km) portion connecting SR 99 with downtown Visalia. The legislature also approved funding toward acquiring the right of way for extending the highway east of Visalia toward Farmersville. The projected cost in 1958 of the entire freeway east of Visalia was $13 million (equivalent to $145.1 million in 2025), and was scheduled to be completed by 1964. As construction of the new highway began, Visalia residents protested the removal of oak trees for the project; as a result, the plans were adjusted to avoid cutting down the trees. On May 29, 1958, the first portion of the freeway opened.

In May 1959, the California Division of Highways announced a plan to rebuild 7.6 miles (12.2 km) of SR 198 in eastern Tulare County; the older roadway would be submerged under the Terminus Dam, which was later finished in 1962. In July 1959, the state announced plans to build a freeway through Hanford. Later that year in November, state officials announced plans that a portion of the SR 198 freeway in Visalia would be buried in a trench from Mooney Avenue to Ben Maddox Way, eliminating the need to construct overpasses. In November 1960, the California legislature authorized $3.4 million (equivalent to $37 million in 2025) toward obtaining right-of-way in both Visalia and Hanford. The relocated roadway around Terminus Dam opened in January 1961. Also that month, the construction of the freeway east of Visalia to Road 192 was approved, with the remainder of the freeway unplanned at that time as contingent on the routing of SR 65. The latter road was originally planned as a freeway along the eastern side of the county, a project that was ultimately canceled. In February 1962, a large rockslide near the Terminus Dam forced drivers to temporarily use the old route, which was not removed after its relocation. In November 1962, California awarded the $1.95 million (equivalent to $20.8 million in 2025) construction contract to finish the freeway through Visalia. In June 1965, the new freeway from Lemoore to Hanford opened, which was later extended through Hanford in 1967. In July 1965, the new freeway through Visalia opened.

The California Division of Highways unveiled plans in September 1969 to rebuild the SR 198 interchange with SR 99. Caltrans approved the $8.9 million (equivalent to $53.3 million in 2025) project in 1975, which was completed in 1977. Ahead of the completion in 1972, a 2-mile (3.2 km) portion of SR 198 was expanded to four lanes from the 99 interchange, west to Road 68.

Construction began in November 2009 on a project to widen a two-lane, 10-mile (16 km) section of SR 198 between SR 43 and SR 99 into a four-lane expressway. The $60 million (equivalent to $84.1 million in 2025) project was completed in December 2012.

== Future ==
On the east side of Visalia, Caltrans, in conjunction with the city and the Tulare County Association of Governments, plans to build a new interchange at Road 148. Construction is estimated to cost at least $135 million, with work scheduled to begin in 2032 and be completed in 2035.

In Hanford, the 9th Avenue project will replace the existing at-grade intersection with a full interchange. Construction is scheduled to begin in 2032 and the interchange is expected to open in 2034 at an estimated cost of $80 million to $110 million. The project would close the short gap in the freeway within the city.

The Kings County Association of Governments (KCAG) has expressed a desire to improve the state highways within the county. KCAG has said that developers have expressed interest in building distribution warehouses in Kings County because of its strategic location midway between the Los Angeles and San Francisco Bay areas, but the lack of freeway access has been cited as a deterrent. For SR 198, KCAG has proposed extending the freeway segment from Naval Air Station Lemoore to I-5. However, Kings County voters have shown little interest in approving transportation taxes to fund these projects.

== Major intersections ==
Except where prefixed with a letter, postmiles were measured on the road as it was in 1964, based on the alignment that existed at the time, and do not necessarily reflect current mileage. Postmile prefixes include: R reflecting a realignment in the route since then, M indicating a second realignment, L referring to an overlap due to a correction or change, and T indicating postmiles classified as temporary. Segments that remain unconstructed or have been relinquished to local control may be omitted. The numbers reset at county lines; the start and end postmiles in each county are given in the county column.

County	Location	Postmile	Exit	Destinations	Notes
Monterey; MON R0.00-25.79	San Lucas	R0.00		Lockwood-San Lucas Road, Bunte Road	Continuation beyond US 101
Monterey; MON R0.00-25.79	San Lucas	R0.11		US 101	Interchange; west end of SR 198; US 101 exit 273
Monterey; MON R0.00-25.79		14.00		SR 25 north – Pinnacles National Park, Hollister	Southern terminus of SR 25
Fresno; FRE 0.00-42.73	Coalinga	22.37		Polk Street to SR 33 south – Stratford, Taft	
Fresno; FRE 0.00-42.73	Coalinga	22.65 15.71 (Note: Indicates that the postmile represents the distance along SR 33 rather than SR 198.)		SR 33 south (Fifth Street) to I-5 south / Coalinga Plaza (Fifth Street)	West end of SR 33 overlap
Fresno; FRE 0.00-42.73		24.32 22.66		SR 33 north (Coalinga-Mendota Road) to I-5 north / Shell Road – Mendota, Los Banos, Fresno	East end of SR 33 overlap
Fresno; FRE 0.00-42.73		26.81		I-5 (West Side Freeway) – Sacramento, Los Angeles	Interchange; I-5 exit 334
Fresno; FRE 0.00-42.73		34.66		SR 269 (Lassen Avenue) – Five Points, Huron	
Kings; KIN 0.00-28.33	Lemoore Station	3.01		Lemoore NAS (Reeves Boulevard)	
Kings; KIN 0.00-28.33	Lemoore Station		West end of freeway		
Kings; KIN 0.00-28.33	Lemoore Station	4.99	73	Stratford (Jackson Avenue)	Eastbound signage
Kings; KIN 0.00-28.33	Lemoore Station	4.99	73	Avenal (Avenal Cutoff Road)	Westbound signage
Kings; KIN 0.00-28.33	Lemoore	R8.90	77	SR 41 – Lemoore, Paso Robles, Fresno	
Kings; KIN 0.00-28.33	Lemoore		78	19th Avenue	
Kings; KIN 0.00-28.33	Lemoore	R10.56	79	18th Avenue, Lemoore Avenue – Central Lemoore	
Kings; KIN 0.00-28.33		R12.11	81	Houston Avenue, D Street – Lemoore	
Kings; KIN 0.00-28.33	Armona	R14.77	83	14th Avenue – Armona	
Kings; KIN 0.00-28.33	Armona	R15.75	84	Hanford-Armona Road, 13th Avenue – Armona	
Kings; KIN 0.00-28.33	Hanford	R16.91	85	12th Avenue	Serves Adventist Health Medical Center
Kings; KIN 0.00-28.33	Hanford	R17.91	86	11th Avenue	Eastbound exit and westbound entrance
Kings; KIN 0.00-28.33	Hanford	R18.3	87A	Redington Street – Central Hanford	Westbound exit and entrance
Kings; KIN 0.00-28.33	Hanford	R18.51	87	Douty Street – Central Hanford	No westbound exit
Kings; KIN 0.00-28.33	Hanford	R18.96	87B	10th Avenue	Westbound exit and eastbound entrance
Kings; KIN 0.00-28.33	Hanford		East end of freeway		
Kings; KIN 0.00-28.33	Hanford	R19.96	88	9th Avenue	Scheduled to be upgraded from an at-grade intersection to a full interchange between 2032 and 2034
Kings; KIN 0.00-28.33	Hanford		West end of freeway		
Kings; KIN 0.00-28.33	Hanford	R20.98	89	SR 43 – Selma, Corcoran	
Kings; KIN 0.00-28.33			East end of freeway		
Tulare; TUL 0.00-44.16			West end of freeway		
Tulare; TUL 0.00-44.16	Visalia	R3.83	101	SR 99 – Los Angeles, Sacramento	Signed as exits 101A (south) and 101B (north) westbound; former US 99; SR 99 north exits 96-97, south exit 97
Tulare; TUL 0.00-44.16	Visalia	R4.80	102	Plaza Drive (CR J19)	
Tulare; TUL 0.00-44.16	Visalia	5.76	103	Shirk Road	
Tulare; TUL 0.00-44.16	Visalia	6.76	104	Akers Street	
Tulare; TUL 0.00-44.16	Visalia	7.76	105A	Demaree Street	
Tulare; TUL 0.00-44.16	Visalia	R8.75	105B	SR 63 south (Mooney Boulevard) – Tulare	West end of SR 63 overlap; serves College of the Sequoias
Tulare; TUL 0.00-44.16	Visalia	R9.97	107A	SR 63 north (Court Street) – Cutler, Orosi, Kings Canyon, Central Visalia	East end of SR 63 overlap; serves Kaweah Health Medical Center
Tulare; TUL 0.00-44.16	Visalia	R10.73	107B	Ben Maddox Way – Woodlake	
Tulare; TUL 0.00-44.16	Visalia	R11.72	108	SR 216 east (Lovers Lane / CR J15) – Visalia	Western terminus of SR 216
Tulare; TUL 0.00-44.16			109	Road 148	Scheduled to open in 2035
Tulare; TUL 0.00-44.16		R13.74	110	Road 156 – Ivanhoe	
Tulare; TUL 0.00-44.16	Farmersville	R14.65	111	Farmersville Boulevard (CR J23)	
Tulare; TUL 0.00-44.16			East end of freeway		
Tulare; TUL 0.00-44.16		R18.76		SR 65 south (Road 196 / CR J27) – Exeter, Lindsay, Porterville	Northern terminus of SR 65 south segment
Tulare; TUL 0.00-44.16		R19.76		SR 245 north / Road 204 – Woodlake, Kings Canyon	Southern terminus of SR 245
Tulare; TUL 0.00-44.16	Lemon Cove	27.96		SR 216 west – Woodlake	Eastern terminus of SR 216
Tulare; TUL 0.00-44.16	Sequoia National Park boundary	44.16		Generals Highway	East end of SR 198; continuation beyond the Sequoia National Park boundary
1.000 mi = 1.609 km; 1.000 km = 0.621 mi: Concurrency terminus; Incomplete access; Unopened
