= CA-137 =

CA-137 may refer to:

- California State Route 137, a highway in the US state of California
- Cluster of differentiation antigen 137, a protein
- Caesium-137 (Cs-137), a radioactive isotope of caesium
