= California Freeway and Expressway System =

Highway system

- Standard route signage in California for (from left-to-right) an Interstate Highway, a U.S. Highway, and a State Route

- Map of the system

Highway names
- Interstates: Interstate XX (I-XX)
- US Highways: U.S. Route XX (US XX)
- State: State Route XX (SR XX)

System links
- State highways in California; Interstate; US; State; Scenic; History; Pre‑1964; Unconstructed; Deleted; Freeways

The California Freeway and Expressway System is a system of existing or planned freeways and expressways in the U.S. state of California. It encompasses both state highways (which includes Interstate highways) in California. It was defined by Article 2 (commencing with section 250) of Chapter 2 of Division 1 of the Streets and Highways Code. which was originally added by Chapter 1062 of 1959.

== List of roads in the system ==
The following is a list of roads defined by the Streets and Highways Code, sections 250–257, as part of the California Freeway and Expressway System. Some of the routes listed may still be in the planning stages of being fully upgraded to freeways or expressways.

1. State Route 1 (part)
2. State Route 2 (part)
3. State Route 3 (part)
4. State Route 4 (part)
5. Interstate 5
6. U.S. Route 6
7. State Route 7
8. Interstate 8
9. State Route 9
10. Interstate 10
11. State Route 11
12. State Route 12
13. State Route 13 (part)
14. State Route 14
15. Interstate 15 and State Route 15
16. State Route 16 (part)
17. State Route 17 (part)
18. State Route 18
19. State Route 19
20. State Route 20 (part)
21. State Route 22 (part)
22. State Route 23 (part)
23. State Route 24
24. State Route 25 (part)
25. State Route 26 (part)
26. State Route 27
27. State Route 28
28. State Route 29
29. State Route 32
30. State Route 33 (part)
31. State Route 34
32. State Route 35 (part)
33. State Route 36 (part)
34. State Route 37
35. State Route 38 (part)
36. State Route 39 (part)
37. Interstate 40
38. State Route 41 (part)
39. State Route 43 (part)
40. State Route 44
41. State Route 45 (part)
42. State Route 46 (part)
43. State Route 47
44. State Route 48
45. State Route 49 (part)
46. U.S. Route 50
47. State Route 51 (signed as Interstate 80 Business in Sacramento)
48. State Route 52
49. State Route 53
50. State Route 54
51. State Route 55
52. State Route 56
53. State Route 57
54. State Route 58 (part)
55. State Route 59
56. State Route 60
57. State Route 61
58. State Route 62 (part)
59. State Route 63
60. State Route 65
61. State Route 66
62. State Route 67
63. State Route 68
64. State Route 70
65. State Route 71
66. State Route 72
67. State Route 73
68. State Route 74
69. State Route 75
70. State Route 76 (part)
71. State Route 77 (part)
72. State Route 78
73. State Route 79 (part)
74. Interstate 80
75. State Route 81
76. State Route 82
77. State Route 83
78. State Route 84 (part)
79. State Route 85
80. State Route 86
81. State Route 87
82. State Route 88
83. State Route 89
84. State Route 90
85. State Route 91 (part)
86. State Route 92 (part)
87. State Route 93
88. State Route 94 (part)
89. U.S. Route 95 (part)
90. State Route 96
91. U.S. Route 97
92. State Route 98
93. State Route 99
94. State Route 100
95. U.S. Route 101 (part)
96. State Route 102
97. State Route 103
98. State Route 104
99. Interstate 105
100. State Route 107
101. State Route 108
102. State Route 109
103. Interstate 110 and State Route 110 (part)
104. State Route 111 (part)
105. State Route 113 (part)
106. State Route 114
107. State Route 115
108. State Route 116 (part)
109. State Route 118
110. State Route 120 (part)
111. State Route 121
112. State Route 122
113. State Route 123
114. State Route 124
115. State Route 125
116. State Route 126
117. State Route 127 (part)
118. State Route 128 (part)
119. State Route 129
120. State Route 130
121. State Route 131
122. State Route 132 (part)
123. State Route 133 (part)
124. State Route 134
125. State Route 135 (part)
126. State Route 136
127. State Route 137 (part)
128. State Route 138 (part)
129. State Route 139
130. State Route 140
131. State Route 142 (part)
132. State Route 144
133. State Route 145
134. State Route 146
135. State Route 147
136. State Route 148
137. State Route 149
138. State Route 150
139. State Route 151
140. State Route 152 (part)
141. State Route 153
142. State Route 154
143. State Route 155
144. State Route 156
145. State Route 158
146. State Route 160 (part)
147. State Route 161
148. State Route 162
149. State Route 163
150. State Route 164
151. State Route 165
152. State Route 166 (part)
153. State Route 167
154. State Route 168 (part)
155. State Route 169
156. State Route 170 (part)
157. State Route 172
158. State Route 173
159. State Route 174
160. State Route 175
161. State Route 177
162. State Route 178 (part)
163. State Route 179
164. State Route 180 (part)
165. State Route 181
166. State Route 182
167. State Route 183
168. State Route 184
169. State Route 185
170. State Route 186
171. State Route 187
172. State Route 188
173. State Route 189
174. State Route 190 (part)
175. State Route 191
176. State Route 192
177. State Route 193 (part)
178. State Route 195
179. State Route 197
180. State Route 198 (part)
181. U.S. Route 199
182. State Route 200
183. State Route 201
184. State Route 202
185. State Route 203
186. State Route 204
187. Interstate 205
188. State Route 207
189. Interstate 210 and State Route 210
190. State Route 211
191. State Route 213
192. Interstate 215
193. State Route 216
194. State Route 217
195. State Route 218
196. State Route 219
197. State Route 220
198. State Route 221
199. State Route 222
200. State Route 223
201. State Route 225
202. State Route 227 (part)
203. State Route 229
204. State Route 230
205. State Route 232
206. State Route 233
207. State Route 236
208. State Route 237
209. Interstate 238 and State Route 238
210. State Route 241
211. State Route 242
212. State Route 243
213. State Route 244
214. State Route 245
215. State Route 246
216. State Route 247
217. State Route 253
218. State Route 254
219. State Route 255
220. State Route 259
221. State Route 261
222. State Route 262
223. State Route 263
224. State Route 265
225. State Route 266
226. State Route 267
227. State Route 269
228. State Route 270
229. State Route 271
230. State Route 273
231. State Route 275
232. Interstate 280
233. State Route 281 (part)
234. State Route 282
235. State Route 283
236. State Route 284
237. State Route 299 (part)
238. State Route 330
239. State Route 371
240. Interstate 380
241. U.S. Route 395 (part)
242. Interstate 405
243. Interstate 505
244. Interstate 580
245. Interstate 605
246. Interstate 680
247. Interstate 710 and State Route 710
248. Interstate 780
249. Interstate 805
250. Interstate 880
251. State Route 905 (part)
252. Interstate 980
