= California State Route 180 =

Highway in California

State Route 180
- SR 180 highlighted in red

Route information
- Maintained by Caltrans
- Length: 112.31 mi (180.75 km) (via old route in Fresno)
- Existed: 1934–present
- Tourist routes: Kings Canyon Scenic Byway
- Restrictions: The segment from Hume Road east to Kings Canyon National Park closed in winter

Major junctions
- West end: SR 33 in Mendota
- SR 99 in Fresno; SR 41 in Fresno; SR 63 near Orange Cove; SR 245 in Sequoia National Forest
- East end: Kings Canyon National Park west boundary (state maintenance)

Location
- Country: United States
- State: California
- Counties: Fresno, Tulare

Highway system
- State highways in California; Interstate; US; State; Scenic; History; Pre‑1964; Unconstructed; Deleted; Freeways
← SR 178	→ SR 182

State Route 180 (SR 180) is a state highway in the U.S. state of California. It runs through the heart of the San Joaquin Valley from State Route 33 in Mendota through Fresno, and then east towards the Sierra Nevada to Kings Canyon National Park.

An unbuilt segment of SR 180 is defined west to Paicines. Nearly the entire 24-mile (39 km) stretch from the Kings River crossing to Cedar Grove is eligible for the State Scenic Highway System, and nearly the entire route from Paicines to Cedar Grove is part of the California Freeway and Expressway System. Two segments travel through national parks, so are not state maintained and are thus exceptions to the above: a segment through the General Grant Grove section of Kings Canyon National Park, and the far eastern end of the road inside of Kings Canyon National Park. The freeway through Fresno has the distinction of having the most heavily traveled section of road in the San Joaquin Valley. Major plans include an extension west from Mendota to Interstate 5.

== Route description ==
Route 180 is defined in section 480 of the California Streets and Highways Code:

Route 180 is from:
(a) Route 25 near Paicines to Route 5.
(b) Route 5 to Route 99 passing near Mendota.
(c) Route 99 near Fresno to the General Grant Grove section of Kings Canyon National Park.
(d) The General Grant Grove section of Kings Canyon National Park to Kings Canyon National Park boundary near Cedar Grove.

The definition omits the federally maintained segments within Kings Canyon National Park, while the state still controls the segment that runs outside the park between General Grant Grove and Cedar Grove. In addition, the actual western terminus of SR 180 is at SR 33 in Mendota, with the unconstructed portion defined west across Interstate 5 to SR 25 in Paicines, currently signed as County Route J1 In Mendota, the route is carried on Oller Street and San Benito Avenue, then travels along Whitesbridge Avenue through Kerman to Fresno.

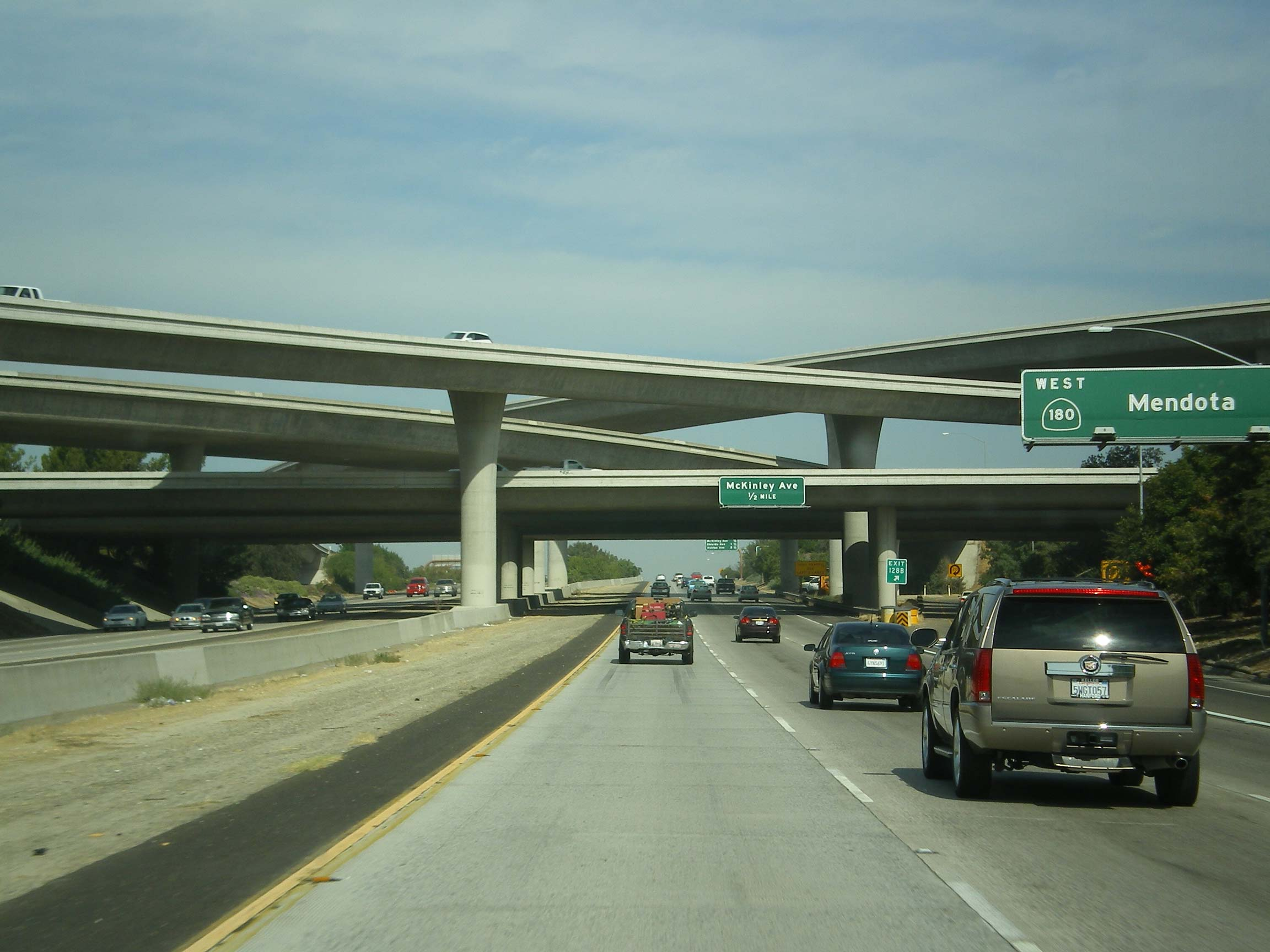
Northbound on SR 41, approaching its interchange with SR 180. The mainline traffic of SR 180 is on the lowest overpass.

Through Fresno, from Brawley Avenue to DeWolf Avenue, it is a 4-to-10-lane freeway intersecting SR 99 in a 2-level stack, SR 41 in a 4-level stack, and the southern terminus of SR 168.

SR 180 is a busy commercial route along most of its urban length, being a main street of Mendota, Kerman, Minkler, and Yokuts Valley. In east Fresno, the Kings Canyon corridor is one of the largest multicultural business districts in the city, together with east Belmont a mile north. The old Fresno "main street" of Broadway has long been torn down for Chuckchansi Park and Fulton Mall parking, but Stanislaus, Tuolumne, and Cesar Chavez Streets remain commercially viable, despite having fallen into some neglect over the years. This segment was redeveloped as part of a city project, as well as the preservation or relocation of a number of historic buildings in Old Armenian Town on Cesar Chavez, with the creation of a new commercial district by the same name.

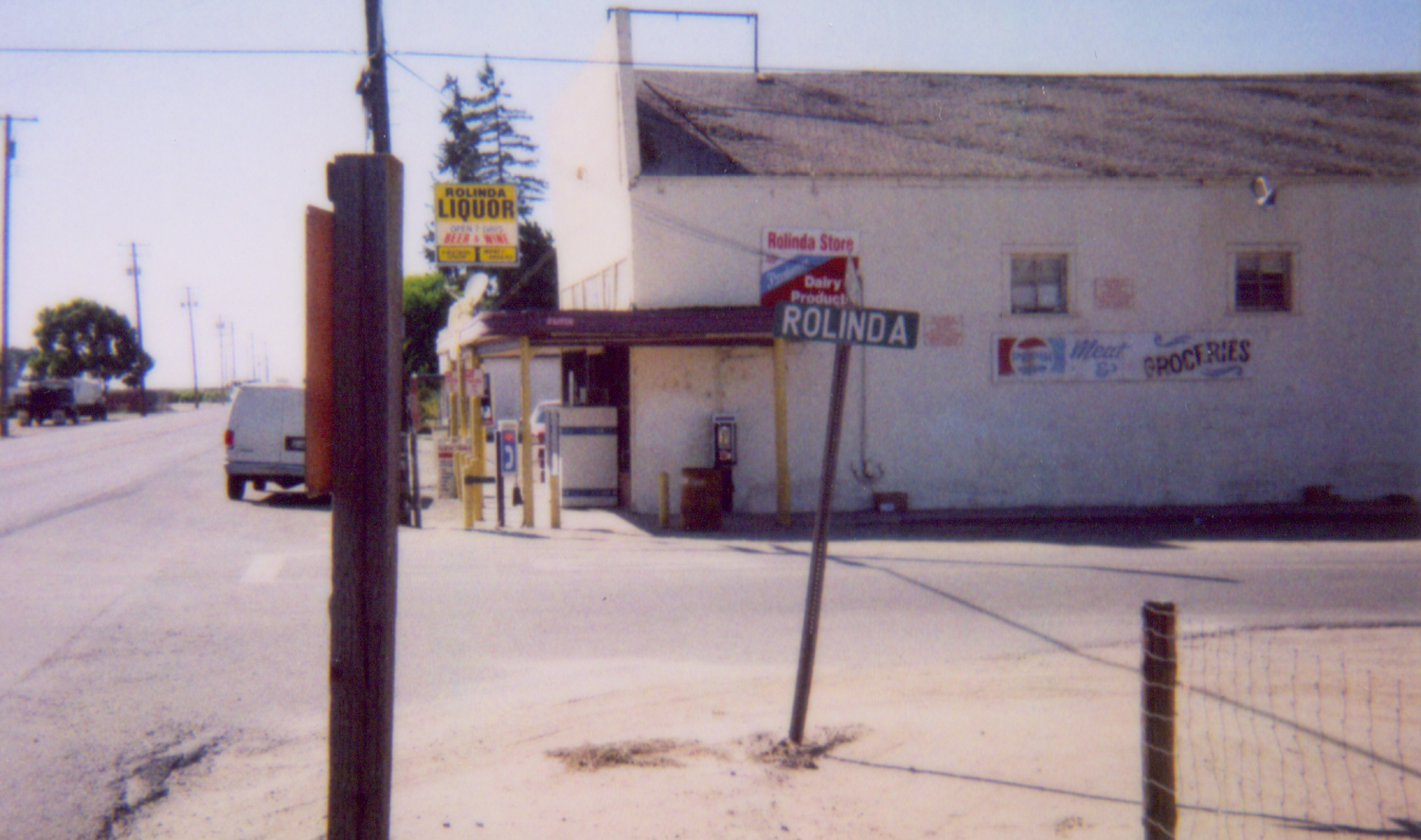
Rolinda Store, Fresno County

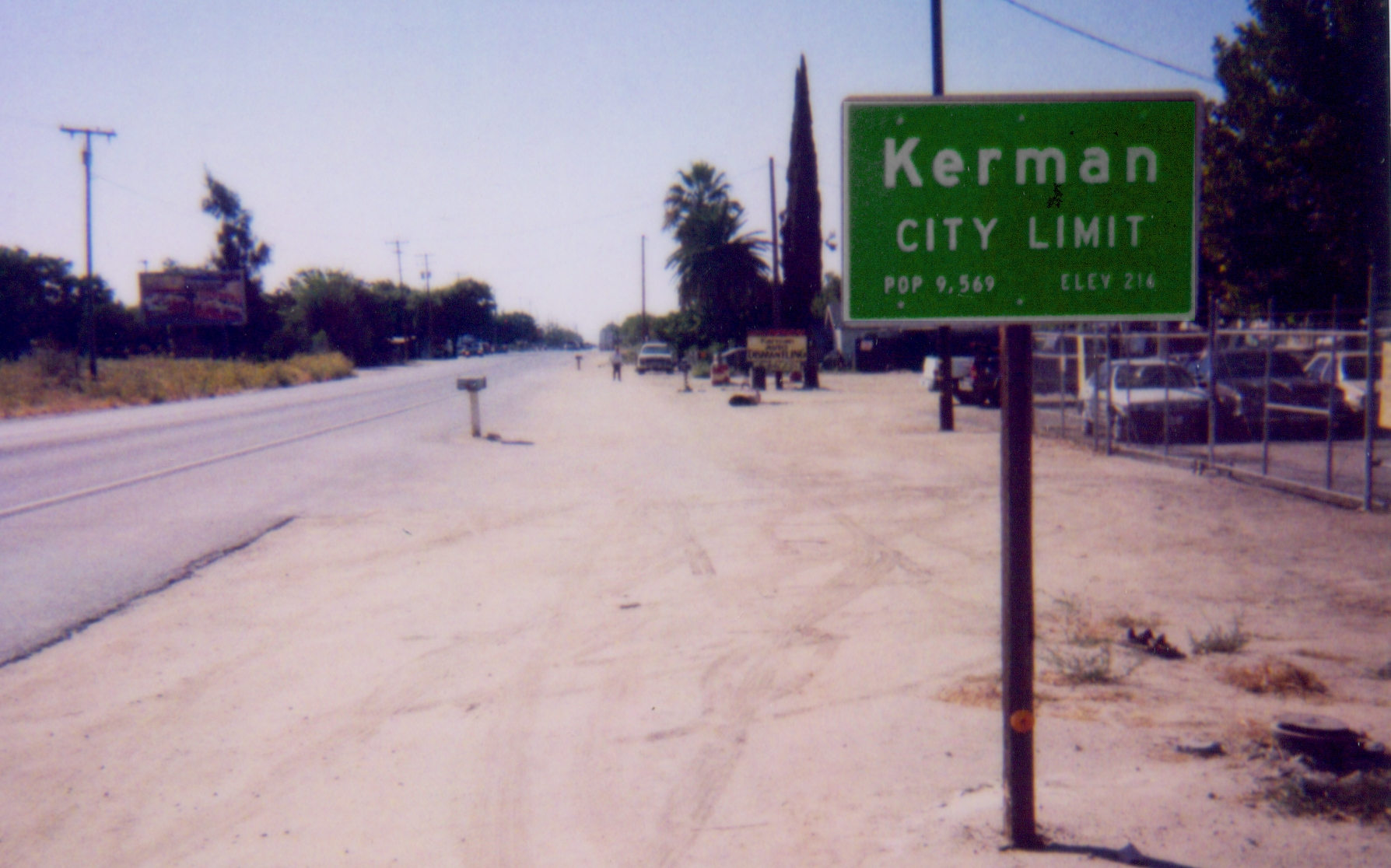
East extent of Kerman along SR 180.

East of Fresno, the freeway links up with the original routing on Kings Canyon Blvd, and continues north of Sanger, through Centerville, Minkler and Yokuts Valley, before arriving at the entrance to Sierra National Forest near Dunlap. It follows the Kings River into General Grant Grove, where the Generals Highway splits off south toward Sequoia National Park and SR 198. SR 180 then turns north, passing through Wilsonia, leaving General Grant Grove, then turns east as it nears the South Fork of the Kings River near Hume. At the entrance of Kings Canyon National Park, SR 180 legally ends but the road continues east through Cedar Grove to a dead-end in Kanawyers; the road inside the park is federally maintained and is not included in the state highway system, but the park may still sign it as SR 180 at intersections. The entire portion beyond Hume Road is closed during winters, usually after the first snowfall.

The majority of SR 180, from SR 25 to the entrance of General Grant Grove, is part of the California Freeway and Expressway System, but only the piece in Fresno has actually been constructed to freeway standards. A 24-mile (39 km) length east of unbuilt State Route 65 near Minkler to the boundary of Kings Canyon, excepting the 2-mile (3.2 km) portion through General Grant Grove, is eligible for the State Scenic Highway System; most of this segment was officially designated as a scenic highway by the California Department of Transportation in 2016. The road inside of General Grant Grove and Kings Canyon is a National Forest Service Byway known as the Kings Canyon Scenic Byway. The old route east of SR 99 to the General Grant Grove is part of the National Highway System, a network of highways that are considered essential to the country's economy, defense, and mobility by the Federal Highway Administration.

In Fresno, SR 180 is Sequoia-Kings Canyon Freeway, named for its destinations to the east in the Sierra Nevada - Sequoia National Park and Kings Canyon National Park. Overlapping this, between SR 99 and Clovis Avenue it is the Senator Jim Costa Highway, after a longtime Assemblyman, Senator, and Congressman for Fresno; between Clovis Avenue and General Grant Grove Park, in the County of Fresno, it is the Senator Chuck Poochigian Highway, after the State Senator who sponsored the funding bills for its completion. The SR 41/SR 180 interchange is named the Rose Ann Vuich Interchange, for the longtime State Senator who secured funding for the initial freeway. Inside of Kings Canyon it is the Kings River Highway.

SR 180 handles a wide range of traffic volumes, from a low of 5,000 per day near Kerman, to over 160,000 at the highly congested SR 168 interchange, the most-traveled highway segment in the San Joaquin Valley. A study into the use of Measure C funds found that traffic volumes will likely increase between 50% and 100% across the entire road by 2020, especially in the more rural areas.

== History ==
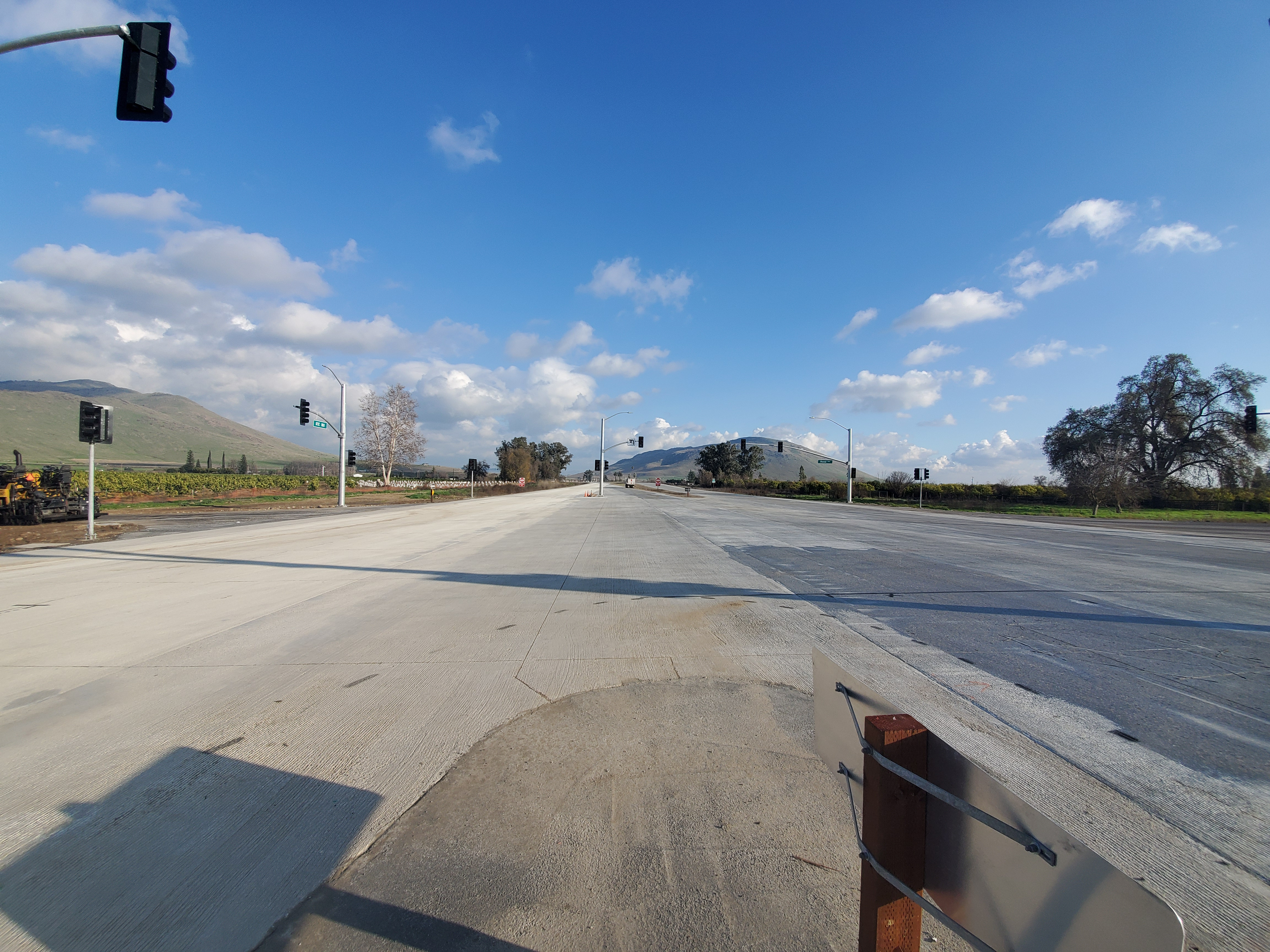
Intersection of Reed Avenue and SR 180 in 2020 before its opening

In 1905, the easternmost portion of what is now SR 180 was created as Legislative Route 41, from General Grant Grove to the Kings River Canyon; in 1919, a bond measure funded the extension and upgrade to Fresno, which was completed by 1933. In 1935 LR 41 was extended to be a road from Kings Canyon to Tracy, signed as SR 180 to Mendota and SR 33 beyond.

Through Fresno from the west, the route turned on B Street, Stanislaus Street, down Broadway (co-routed with US 99), turned at Ventura Street (co-routed with SR 41 for a few blocks) and left downtown on it, becoming Kings Canyon Blvd. At some point the road was split into parallel one-way roads, with eastbound traffic using Amador Street, A Street, and Tuolumne Street before merging into Broadway. The Stanislaus and Tuolumne bridges were built in 1958 to alleviate congestion at the train tracks and local industry, and when US 99 moved to a freeway bypass in 1962, the 180 co-routing followed it. The bypassed route was given back to the City of Fresno; the bridges still exist but the segment of Broadway between Mariposa and Inyo Streets is now gone (Chukchansi Park was built over part of this former section of Broadway in 2002).

When California converted its old Legislative routes to individual State routes in 1963, SR 180 was legally extended to US 101 in Hollister, then truncated at SR 25 in 1984 after the construction of SR 156. None of this route has been improved, and is signed only as County Route J1 for most of its extent. (See Future.) The existing routes from I-5 to SR-25, passing through Panoche and Llanada, are rugged and not currently state-maintained.

The Fresno Master Freeway Plan was developed in the postwar boom, with a western bypass by SR 99, an eastern bypass by SR 41, and a northern bypass by SR 180. SR 99 was constructed in 1962, but lack of funds and a "freeway revolt" prevented the construction of the SR 180 and SR 41 freeways. SR 180 was particularly controversial because it cut through one of Fresno's historic districts. (See Controversy.) It was delayed so long that CalTrans was prepared to tear down the stack interchange at SR 41 (built in 1982) and delete the routing, but in 1988 funds finally became available thanks to the local Measure C sales tax; construction of the viaduct began in 1992, opening between SR 99 and SR 41 in 1995, to SR 168 in 1999, and extending east of SR 168 and west of SR 99 in the 2000s. Overall the final product was nearly as originally envisioned by the Highway Commission (now CTC).

Officially, Caltrans considered the freeway bypass as State Route 180S (supplemental) until the old highway on downtown Fresno surface streets was relinquished in 2012. While the old routing of SR 180 through downtown remained on the books, it was no longer signed and not considered a business route. The road no longer connected with its freeway bypass at all; the east and west ends terminate in cul-de-sacs, and local agencies were generally forced to maintain or improve the road.

In recognition that the freeway connecting SR 41 and SR 168 is by far the most traveled segment of road in the San Joaquin Valley and prone to daily congestion and accidents, Caltrans constructed of the "Fresno 180 Braided Ramps" between the freeways. The first ramps opened in 2013 and the entire project was then completed in early 2014. These ramps allow direct access between SR 41 and SR 168 without entering the main SR 180 freeway, making it almost a double braided ramp. The project was delivered in a new format for Caltrans called Design-Build, one of the first projects constructed in the state's pilot program authorized by the State Legislature, wherein the contractor both designs and builds the project with Caltrans oversight.

Some of the downtown segments were included in various revitalization proposals. In particularly, the West Fresno Community Vision Plan of 2004 was adopted by the Fresno Council of Governments to create livable mixed-use areas between Whitesbridge and California Avenues.

In 2020, the section between Smith Road and Frankwood Avenue was upgraded to a 4-lane divided expressway which bypassed the communities of Centerville and Minkler to save eligible historic buildings on the current route. New frontage and connector roads were also built to connect to those roads that used to intersect with SR 180.

=== Controversy ===
The routing of the SR 180 freeway through central Fresno, now known as the 180 Gap neighborhood, split a well-defined working-class neighborhood (particularly the North Park neighborhoods) in half and destroyed many large, historic buildings along Van Ness Avenue and surrounding area. Even after funding dried up, the neighborhood declined dramatically with the ever-present knowledge that everything in its path would be demolished as soon as the money appeared; low property values led to many buildings becoming slums or being condemned and razed long before the freeway came. By the 1980s, community pressure was increasing for Caltrans to either purchase the remaining properties or abandon the route, culminating in a lawsuit against the state, and in 1988 the decision was made to begin eminent domain purchases and construction.

== Future ==
A planned four-lane expressway extension from Mendota to I-5 is in the works, with several proposed routes that bypass Mendota and Kerman, but no final route has been decided on yet.

== Major intersections ==
Except where prefixed with a letter, postmiles were measured on the road as it was in 1964, based on the alignment that existed at the time, and do not necessarily reflect current mileage. R reflects a realignment in the route since then, M indicates a second realignment, L refers to an overlap due to a correction or change, and T indicates postmiles classified as temporary. Segments that remain unconstructed or have been relinquished to local control may be omitted. The numbers reset at county lines; the start and end postmiles in each county are given in the county column.

County	Location	Postmile	Exit	Destinations	Notes
Fresno; FRE 23.50-109.53	Mendota	23.50		SR 33 (Derrick Avenue) – Firebaugh, Los Banos	West end of SR 180
Fresno; FRE 23.50-109.53	Mendota	24.59		Belmont Avenue to I-5 north	
Fresno; FRE 23.50-109.53		26.12		San Benito Avenue, Panoche Road to I-5 south – Tranquillity, San Joaquin	
Fresno; FRE 23.50-109.53		34.59		James Road – Tranquillity, San Joaquin	
Fresno; FRE 23.50-109.53	Kerman	42.64		SR 145 (Madera Avenue) – Madera, Coalinga	
Fresno; FRE 23.50-109.53		47.65		Dickenson Avenue – San Joaquin, Coalinga	
Fresno; FRE 23.50-109.53			West end of freeway		
Fresno; FRE 23.50-109.53	Fresno	R54.66	56	Marks Avenue	
Fresno; FRE 23.50-109.53	Fresno	R56.52	57A	SR 99 – Bakersfield, Sacramento	SR 99 exit 133 north, south exit 133B
Fresno; FRE 23.50-109.53	Fresno	R57.24	57B	Fulton Street, Van Ness Avenue	
Fresno; FRE 23.50-109.53	Fresno	R57.84	58	Abby Street, Blackstone Avenue	
Fresno; FRE 23.50-109.53	Fresno	R58.70	59	SR 41 (Yosemite Freeway) – Lemoore, Paso Robles, Yosemite	Signed as exits 59A (south) and 59B (north) westbound; SR 41 north exits 128A-B, south exit 128
Fresno; FRE 23.50-109.53	Fresno	R59.90	60A	SR 168 east (Sierra Freeway) – Clovis, Huntington Lake	Signed as exit 60 westbound; western terminus of SR 168; SR 168 exits 1A-B
Fresno; FRE 23.50-109.53	Fresno	R60.07	60B	Cedar Avenue	Westbound exit is part of exit 61
Fresno; FRE 23.50-109.53	Fresno	R60.90	61	Chestnut Avenue	Eastbound exit is part of exit 60B
Fresno; FRE 23.50-109.53	Fresno	R62.00	62	Peach Avenue	Access to Fresno Yosemite International Airport
Fresno; FRE 23.50-109.53	Fresno	R62.94	63	Clovis Avenue	
Fresno; FRE 23.50-109.53	Fresno	R63.94	64	Fowler Avenue	
Fresno; FRE 23.50-109.53	Fresno	R65.29	65	Temperance Avenue	
Fresno; FRE 23.50-109.53			East end of freeway		
Fresno; FRE 23.50-109.53		R71.33		Academy Avenue – Sanger, Kingsburg	
Fresno; FRE 23.50-109.53		M77.08		Reed Avenue – Reedley	
Fresno; FRE 23.50-109.53		87.71		SR 63 south (Hills Valley Road) – Orange Cove, Visalia	Northern terminus of SR 63
Fresno; FRE 23.50-109.53		108.12		SR 245 south (Pinehurst) – Pinehurst, Porterville	Northern terminus of SR 245
Tulare; TUL 109.53-112.09	General Grant Grove section of Kings Canyon National Park	110.83	East end of state maintenance at southern park boundary		
Tulare; TUL 109.53-112.09	General Grant Grove section of Kings Canyon National Park		Big Stump Entrance Station; park fee or pass required for entry		
Tulare; TUL 109.53-112.09	General Grant Grove section of Kings Canyon National Park			Generals Highway to SR 198 – Sequoia National Park	Closed in winters
Tulare–Fresno county line	General Grant Grove section of Kings Canyon National Park	112.09	West end of state maintenance at northern park boundary		
Fresno; FRE 112.09-137.94		116.86		Hume Lake Road – Hume Lake	
Fresno; FRE 112.09-137.94		116.86	Eastbound winter closure gate		
Fresno; FRE 112.09-137.94	Kings Canyon National Park	137.94	East end of state maintenance/SR 180 at the western park boundary (closed in winters); road continues inside the park to Kanawyers		
1.000 mi = 1.609 km; 1.000 km = 0.621 mi: Tolled
