= Yettem, California =

Yettem
- census-designated place
- Location in Tulare County and the state of California

- Position in California. Yettem (the United States)
- Coordinates: 36°29′10″N 119°15′09″W
- Country: United States
- State: California
- County: Tulare

Area
  - Total: 0.11 sq mi (0.28 km^{2})
  - Land: 0.11 sq mi (0.28 km^{2})
  - Water: 0 sq mi (0 km^{2})
- Elevation: 348 ft (106 m)

Population (2020)
  - Total: 201
  - Density: 1,900/sq mi (720/km^{2})
- Time zone: UTC-8 (Pacific (PST))
  - Summer (DST): UTC-7 (PDT)
- ZIP code: 93670
- Area code: 559
- GNIS feature IDs: 2585465

Yettem is a census-designated place (CDP) in Tulare County, California. Yettem is located on California State Route 201 11 miles (18 km) north of Visalia. Yettem has a post office with ZIP code 93670. The 2020 United States census reported Yettem's population was 201.

Yettem name was submitted to the United States Postal service by Hagop Hamalian, the town storekeeper and future postmaster, along with Ezekiel Kendigian and Devlat Agha Moorsalian submitted Armenia, Ararat, and Yettem as suggestions for a name change for the town to the Post Office Department, which chose Yettem. Yettem is how Western Armenians pronounce the Armenian word for Eden. Although most of the Armenian population has moved away, there is still an active St. Mary's Armenian Church in Yettem.

== Geography ==
According to the United States Census Bureau, the CDP covers an area of 0.11 square miles (0.28 km^{2}), all of it land.

== Demographics ==
Historical population
Census	Pop.	Note	%±
2010	211		—
2020	201		−4.7%
U.S. Decennial Census; 1850–1870 1880-1890; 1900 1910 1920; 1930 1940 1950; 1960 1970 1980; 1990 2000 2010

Yettem first appeared as a census designated place in the 2010 U.S. census.

The 2020 United States census reported that Yettem had a population of 201. The population density was 1,827 inhabitants per square mile (705/km^{2}). The racial makeup of Yettem was 30 (14.9%) White, 1 (0.5%) African American, 1 (0.5%) Native American, 3 (1.5%) Asian, 0 (0.0%) Pacific Islander, 123 (61.2%) from other races, and 43 (21.4%) from two or more races. Hispanic or Latino of any race were 189 persons (94.0%).

The census reported that 100% of the population lived in households. There were 49 households, out of which 29 (59%) included children under the age of 18, 26 (53%) were married-couple households, 2 (4%) were cohabiting couple households, 18 (37%) had a female householder with no partner present, and 3 (6%) had a male householder with no partner present. 2 households (4%) were one person, and 2 (4%) were one person aged 65 or older. The average household size was 4.10. There were 45 families (92% of all households).

The age distribution was 65 people (32.3%) under the age of 18, 36 people (17.9%) aged 18 to 24, 60 people (29.9%) aged 25 to 44, 27 people (13.4%) aged 45 to 64, and 13 people (6.5%) who were 65 years of age or older. The median age was 24.9 years. There were 129 males and 72 females.

There were 49 housing units at an average density of 445 units per square mile (172 units/km^{2}), which were all occupied, 5 (10%) by homeowners, and 44 (90%) by renters.

== Education ==
It is in the Cutler-Orosi Joint Unified School District.
