= List of deleted state highways in California =

Deleted state highways in California
- Highway shields for the deleted California State Routes 31 and 195

Highway names
- Interstates: Interstate XX (I-XX)
- US Highways: U.S. Route XX (US XX)
- State: State Route XX (SR XX)

System links
- State highways in California; Interstate; US; State; Scenic; History; Pre‑1964; Unconstructed; Deleted; Freeways

Since the current state highway system in California was designated, several routes have been deleted from the system by the California Department of Transportation (Caltrans), and its definition removed from Section 301-635 of the California Streets and Highways Code by the California State Legislature.

Some of them were deleted before or during the 1964 state highway renumbering.

== State Route 7 (1964–1984) ==
State Route 7
- Location: Long Beach–Monterey Park
- Existed: 1964–1985

State Route 7 (SR 7) ran from SR 1 near SR 47 in Long Beach to Valley Boulevard in Monterey Park as the Long Beach Freeway. Originally running as State Route 15 in 1934, the route was changed to prevent confusion with Interstate 15 (I-15). In 1985, SR 7 was deleted and has since been renumbered as I-710. SR 7 was redesignated in Calexico from I-8 near Holtville to the United States/Mexico border in 1990. This route was completed in 2005.

== State Route 11 (1934–1981) ==
State Route 11
- Location: San Pedro–Pasadena
- Existed: 1934–1981

State Route 11 followed the route of current Route 110 along the Harbor Freeway and the Arroyo Seco Parkway. It initially followed surface streets until the 1940s when the Arroyo Seco Parkway was completed. The Harbor Freeway, which was constructed to interstate standards, opened in phases from the late 1950s to the 1970s and SR 11 was since transferred to that route. In December 1978, the Harbor Freeway was approved as an Interstate Highway by the FHWA. In 1981, SR 11 was deleted and has since been renumbered as Interstate 110 on the Harbor Freeway, and State Route 110 on the Pasadena Freeway.

SR 11 was redesignated in San Diego from SR 905 near SR 125 to the United States/Mexico border in 1994 and the first segment opened in 2016.

== State Route 21 ==
State Route 21
- Location: San Jose–Fairfield
- Existed: 1934–1976

State Route 21 closely followed the route of current Interstate 680 (I-680). It began in San Jose heading northeast from I-280 and US 101 and closely paralleling SR 17 (now I-880) until reaching Fremont. From there, SR 21 headed northeast toward Pleasanton and intersected I-580. SR 21 then headed northwest to Concord and Martinez, California, intersecting SR 24 and SR 4 before reaching the Carquinez Strait. In Benicia, SR 21 intersected with SR 141 (now I-780) and ended in Fairfield at I-80.

The route was added to the Interstate Highway System in 1973. This became the new alignment of I-680, and the old route to Vallejo became I-780. SR 21 was then deleted in 1976 once corresponding changes were made by the state legislature.

== State Route 30 ==
State Route 30
- Location: San Dimas–Redlands
- Existed: 1933–2007

State Route 30 ran from Interstate 210 in San Dimas to Interstate 10 in Redlands through San Bernardino. It was built to freeway standards between Interstate 215 in San Bernardino and Interstate 10 and between the current terminus of State Route 57 in San Dimas to Foothill Boulevard in La Verne. When the freeway section between Foothill Boulevard and Interstate 215 was completed in 2007, the route was decommissioned and renumbered SR 210. It is expected to be incorporated into the Interstate highway system at some later date as an extension of Interstate 210.

== State Route 31 ==
State Route 31
- Location: Corona–Devore
- Existed: 1934–1974

State Route 31 ran from State Route 91 near Corona to Interstate 15 in Devore through San Bernardino. The route was deleted in 1974, when it was added to the interstate system. After being signed California 31, it was signed Temporary Interstate 15, and later, after being moved from Main Street in Corona, Hamner Avenue in Riverside County north of Corona, and Milliken Avenue in San Bernardino County to the Ontario Freeway. The route became Interstate 15.

== State Route 42 ==
State Route 42
- Location: Inglewood–Norwalk
- Length: 18.82 mi (30.29 km)
- Existed: 1960–2000

State Route 42 ran from State Route 1 west of Inglewood to State Route 91 near Norwalk, largely along Manchester Avenue and Firestone Boulevard. It was deleted in 2000. The segment east of Interstate 5 (Santa Ana Freeway) was added to State Route 90. The segment west of Interstate 5 was added to the interstate system as Interstate 105. The freeway would not be opened until 1993, which resulted in the original route continuing to be signed as State Route 42. To this day, Route 42 is still sporadically signed in many places.

== State Route 69 ==
State Route 69
- Location: Exeter–Dunlap
- Existed: 1964–1972

State Route 69 began at SR 198 amid Tulare County. It then headed north and intersected SR 216 in Woodlake and CR J27 amid farmland in the county. The route continued to meet SR 201 in Elderwood. After several miles through Tulare County, it crossed into Fresno County, where it met its north end at State Route 180. In 1972, this highway was decommissioned and renumbered SR 245.

== State Route 106 ==
State Route 106
- Location: Running Springs–Redlands
- Existed: 1964–1972

State Route 106 was originally created in 1964, and ran from State Route 38 in Redlands to State Route 18 in Running Springs. Prior to 1964, the highway was a part of Legislative Route 190, which ran from U.S. Route 66 to State Route 38. After 1964, the route was split in half. The western portion became State Route 30. The eastern portion was combined with Legislative Route 207, and became State Route 106. A year later, its southern terminus was moved to Interstate 10. In 1972, State Route 106 was decommissioned. The northern portion between State Route 30 and State Route 18 was renumbered to State Route 330. The southern portion was added to State Route 30, extending it to Interstate 10. This also reconnected both halves of the original Legislative Route 190.

== State Route 157 ==
State Route 157
- Location: San Diego
- Existed: 1964–1994

State Route 157 was planned to run from I-805 near Ocean View Boulevard in San Diego to SR 125 near Sweetwater Reservoir, passing through the neighborhood of Paradise Hills. What was known as Route 285 became a state highway in 1959, and was redesignated as SR 157 in the 1964 state highway renumbering. By 1974, plans called for constructing the freeway from Nogal Street across Imperial Avenue to end at SR 54. However, the project was cancelled after objections from the community, and because it was not compatible with any long-term plans. Developments near the western half of the route served to discourage construction, and the plans for the eastern half were cancelled that year; the land was sold soon afterward. The mayor of National City, Kile Morgan, opposed the proposal, citing concerns that many projects for the South Bay were being opposed by others. The route was removed from the law by the Legislature in 1994.

Browse numbered routes
← SR 156	CA	→ SR 158

== State Route 159 ==
State Route 159
- Location: Pasadena
- Existed: 1964–1992

Between July 1, 1964, and the time it was turned back to local authorities, State Route 159 was the segment of Linda Vista Avenue in Pasadena between State Route 134, the Ventura Freeway, and Interstate 210, the Foothill Freeway. From July 1, 1964, to 1965, this was also the segment of Figueroa Street between State Route 134 and Interstate 5. In 1965, this was to be deleted when I-210 was completed. Prior to July 1, 1964, it was a segment of California Legislative Route 165 and signed as California State Route 11.

Browse numbered routes
← SR 158	CA	→ SR 160

== State Route 171 ==
State Route 171
- Location: San Diego
- Existed: 1964–1994

State Route 171 was planned to run from I-5 near San Diego to I-805 through Switzer Canyon. It was to be called the Switzer Canyon Freeway, and had been suggested by consultant John Nolen in 1926. Originally designated as Route 284 in 1959, the route was renumbered as SR 171 in the 1964 state highway renumbering. However, the community opposed the project; it would have passed through Balboa Park and would have gone through canyons, residential districts, and a golf course. SANDAG endorsed the deletion in 1993, and the Legislature deleted the route in 1994.

Browse numbered routes
← SR 170	CA	→ SR 172

== State Route 176 ==
State Route 176
- Location: Santa Maria - Sisquoc
- Existed: 1964–1984

State Route 176 ran from US 101 in Santa Maria to Sisquoc along Stowell Road, Philbric Road, and Foxen Canyon Road. Prior to July 1, 1964, it was an unsigned segment of California Legislative Route 148.

Browse numbered routes
← SR 175	CA	→ SR 177

== State Route 196 ==
State Route 196
- Location: Palmdale
- Existed: 1933–1965

State Route 196 was planned to run from Route 2 to Route 249 south of Palmdale. It was deleted before it could be constructed in 1965.

Browse numbered routes
← SR 195	CA	→ SR 197

== State Route 206 ==
State Route 206
- Location: San Bernardino - Verdemont
- Existed: 1964–1991

State Route 206 was deleted from the state highway system, with varying reasons. Between July 1, 1964, and the time it was turned back to local authorities, Route 206 ran from Highland Avenue, formerly State Route 30, in San Bernardino along North E Street, Kendall Drive, and Palm Avenue to the Barstow Freeway, Interstate 215, in Verdemont. Prior to July 1, 1964, Route 206 was California Legislative Route 191 and was signed as Business U.S. 66.

Browse numbered routes
← I-205	CA	→ SR 207

== State Route 208 ==
State Route 208
- Location: Rockport–Leggett
- Existed: 1964–1984

State Route 208 (SR 208) was a state highway in Mendocino County that from Rockport to US 101 in Leggett. The route was entirely concurrent with SR 1. This route was deleted in 1984.

== State Route 209 ==
State Route 209
- Location: San Diego
- Length: 8 mi (13 km)
- Existed: 1964–2003

State Route 209 connected Point Loma with the interchange of I-5 and I-8 in San Diego. The route began at Cabrillo National Monument and passed through Fort Rosecrans and the neighborhood of Point Loma via Catalina Boulevard, Canon Street, and Rosecrans Street. This route was deleted in 2003.

== State Route 214 ==
State Route 214
- Location: Long Beach
- Existed: 1964–1998

State Route 214 was deleted in 1998. Between July 1, 1964, and the time it was turned back to local authorities, Route 214 ran between Lakewood Boulevard, then State Route 19, in Long Beach and the Santa Ana Freeway, Interstate 5, in Anaheim. Route 214 traversed Carson Street in Los Angeles County (between Route 19 and the Los Angeles/Orange County Line). It continued into Orange County on Lincoln Avenue (between the Los Angeles/Orange County Line and Route 5). Prior to July 1, 1964, Route 214 was a segment of California Legislative Route 178. Between 1962 and July 1, 1964, it was signed as US 91. Before 1962, it was signed as both US 91 and State Route 18.

Browse numbered routes
← SR 213	CA	→ I-215

== State Route 224 ==
State Route 224
- Location: Carpinteria
- Length: 1.8 mi (2.9 km)
- Existed: 1964–1996

State Route 224 was a spur route connecting U.S. Route 101 in Carpinteria to Carpinteria State Beach. From US 101, it ran south along Casitas Pass Road, then west on Carpinteria Avenue before heading south again along Palm Avenue to the beach's entrance. The route was defined in the 1964 state highway renumbering, then deleted in 1996.

== State Route 228 ==
State Route 228
- Location: Brawley
- Existed: 1964–1998

State Route 228 was to be a short bypass west of Brawley. The road as defined by the California State Legislature in the 1964 state highway renumbering would have begun at SR 86 2.5 miles (4.0 km) southwest of Brawley and ended 2 miles (3.2 km) west of Brawley. However, this was also included in the 1935 definition of Route 26, which continued north to Los Angeles and south to Calexico, along the approximate route of US 99. The route was deleted in 1998; by that time, no highway had been constructed along this route.

Browse numbered routes
← SR 227	CA	→ SR 229

== State Route 231 ==
State Route 231
- Location: Mecca (1963-1972), Irvine-Anaheim (1988-1996)
- Existed: 1963–1972, 1988-1996

State Route 231 was a designation for a state highway from SR 86 to SR 195 near Mecca. In 1935, the route was added to the state highway system. Two years later, the route was given the designation of Route 204. In the 1964 state highway renumbering, the route was renumbered as SR 231. The Division of Highways proposed deleting this state highway in 1971, The routing was removed from the state highway system in 1972.

SR 231 was later used for what is now SR 261 and SR 241.

Browse numbered routes
← SR 230	CA	→ SR 232

== State Route 245 (1963–1965) ==
State Route 245
- Location: Los Angeles
- Existed: 1963–1965

From 1963 to 1965, State Route 245 (SR 245) was originally defined to run from Interstate 5 (I-5) to SR 60 in the Los Angeles area, as a temporary route during construction in Downtown Los Angeles.

== State Route 250 ==
State Route 250
- Location: Orange–Anaheim
- Existed: 1964–1994

State Route 250 was the designation for southern part of State College Boulevard from I-5 in Orange to SR 91 in Anaheim. The routing was only a temporary routing and the route ceased to be a state highway when the adjacent SR 57 freeway was completed.

== State Route 252 ==
State Route 252
- Location: San Diego
- Existed: 1964–1982

State Route 252 was to connect I-5 to I-805, and provide almost direct access from I-805 to I-5, near the southern terminus of SR 15. The route would have run parallel to, and approximately halfway between, the current alignment of SR 94 and SR 54.

SR 252 was defined as Route 283 in 1959, and was redesignated as Route 252 in the 1964 state highway renumbering. The California Highway Commission reviewed a 1.8-mile (2.9 km) proposal for the route in 1965. It was known as the El Toyon Freeway, and plans were to use it to balance the congestion between I-5 and I-805. By 1973, there was opposition based on concerns that it would split the community; according to an engineer from Caltrans, it was "a white man's freeway vs. a black community." If the freeway was not constructed, the federal government would stand to lose $10 million. The Comprehensive Planning Organization in 1974 proposed widening arterial streets nearby as an alternative, even though the construction would affect 240 buildings. Meanwhile, relocation of 280 households and the start of demolition had taken place.

In 1977, a local vote took place to determine what to construct or if SR 252 should be constructed; however, $4.4 million had already been spent to construct the 43rd street interchange with I-805. Alternate plans included a city street and constructing a below-grade freeway. By 1980, the California Transportation Commission had canceled plans to construct SR 252, due to the residential opposition. The city of National City made attempts to have the plans reinstated in 1986 to reduce congestion within city limits. The city of San Diego opposed the idea of constructing an additional freeway, while the county supported it. The state told Caltrans to sell the land to the city of San Diego, though National City expressed interest in purchasing it, even though there would be San Diego city permits needed to construct a freeway on it. National City then sued the state, but agreed to drop the suit in exchange for $10 million in traffic improvements on behalf of the city of San Diego.

In 1993, the San Diego Association of Governments and Caltrans planned to have SR 252, along with SR 157 and SR 171, officially removed; the abandoned land was to be used for residential purposes. The state legislature removed SR 252 from the state highway system in 1994. The only portion constructed is the ramps to and from I-805 at 43rd Street, in southern San Diego, approximately 0.5 miles (0.80 km) long; the ramps were completed in 1975.

Browse numbered routes
← SR 251	CA	→ SR 253

== State Route 256 ==
State Route 256
- Location: Roseville
- Existed: 1965–1994

State Route 256 (SR 256) was a proposed highway from I-80 to State Route 65 north of Roseville, and was deleted in 1994. This was originally signed as part of Route 65, and of US 99E through Roseville. Route 256, a once adopted route for a west-side bypass of Roseville was rescinded by the California Transportation Commission in 1976 because of cost and difficulty of crossing the Southern Pacific Switchyard.

Browse numbered routes
← SR 255	CA	→ SR 257

== State Route 274 ==
State Route 274
- Location: San Diego
- Existed: 1965–1999

State Route 274 (SR 274) ran along Balboa Avenue, entirely within the city of San Diego. The highway started at I-5 in Pacific Beach before continuing east into Kearny Mesa and intersecting I-805 and SR 163 before ending at I-15. Balboa Avenue still exists as a road between I-5 and I-15.

Balboa Avenue was constructed in Pacific Beach by 1956, and east into Clairemont by 1961. The Legislature designated the route as from I-5 to SR 103 in 1965, changing SR 103 to SR 15 in 1969. Between 1969 and 1970, Balboa Avenue was completed from I-5 to SR 163 and signed as SR 274. Completion of the route to I-15 was in place by 1982. A sinkhole 700-foot (210 m) long and 65 feet (20 m) deep opened at the I-15 interchange in 1998 after a storm across the region. The route was deleted from state laws in 1999, and given to the city of San Diego in 2001.

Browse numbered routes
← SR 273	CA	→ SR 275

== State Route 285 ==
State Route 285
- Location: Portola
- Existed: 1964–1998

State Route 285 (SR 285) was defined in 1970 as SR 70 on West Street in Portola northwesterly to the north city limits, then to Lake Davis via Humbug Canyon, and then easterly to Grizzly Reservoir via the south shore of the lake. This was deleted in 1998 because of problems with the right of way and drainage. The route was never constructed. According to the Caltrans photolog, the old alignment for Route 285 essentially is exactly the same as existing West Street (in Portola) and Lake Davis Road northeast to Grizzly Road just northeast of the Big Grizzly Creek.

Browse numbered routes
← SR 284	CA	→ SR 299

== State Route 480 ==
State Route 480
- Location: San Francisco
- Existed: 1968–1991

State Route 480 (SR 480) was a state highway in San Francisco consisting of the elevated double-decker Embarcadero Freeway (also known as the Embarcadero Skyway), the partly elevated Doyle Drive approach to the Golden Gate Bridge and the proposed and unbuilt section in between. The unbuilt section from Doyle Drive to Van Ness Avenue was to have been called the Golden Gate Freeway and the Embarcadero Freeway as originally planned would have extended from Van Ness along the north side of Bay Street and then along the Embarcadero to the San Francisco-Oakland Bay Bridge.

The Embarcadero Freeway, which had only been constructed from Broadway along the Embarcadero to the Bay Bridge, was universally panned with many locals comparing it to the Alaskan Way Viaduct in Seattle. Demands to demolish the freeway were proposed as early as 1963 with the San Francisco Board of Supervisors supporting the proposal. The freeway was eventually demolished after the 1989 Loma Prieta earthquake, and Doyle Drive is now part of U.S. Route 101. SR 480 was Interstate 480, an auxiliary route of the Interstate Highway System, from 1955 to 1965. The entire route was deleted in 1991, approximately two years after the earthquake.
