= List of unconstructed state highways in California =

Unconstructed state highways in California
- Highway shields for the unconstructed California State Routes 48 and 230

Highway names
- Interstates: Interstate XX (I-XX)
- US Highways: U.S. Route XX (US XX)
- State: State Route XX (SR XX)

System links
- State highways in California; Interstate; US; State; Scenic; History; Pre‑1964; Unconstructed; Deleted; Freeways

The following state highways in the U.S. state of California are entirely or partially unconstructed; in other words, their routings have been defined by Section 301-635 of the California Streets and Highways Code, but no route has been adopted by the California Department of Transportation (Caltrans).

== Entirely unconstructed ==
The following California state highways are entirely unconstructed. Their routings are only defined in state law. In almost all cases, Caltrans has no plans to adopt the highways by either constructing new roads along those corridors or take over the maintenance of existing routes from local jurisdictions.

=== State Route 48 ===
State Route 48
- Location: Lancaster–near the Los Angeles–San Bernardino county line

State Route 48 is completely unconstructed, stretching 8.5 miles (13.7 km) from the northern junction of SR 14 and SR 138 near Lancaster east to proposed SR 122.

SR 48 was originally planned to run from Ridge Route Road (approximately four miles east of Interstate 5) near Quail Lake in Los Angeles County to SR 122 near the Los Angeles / San Bernardino County Line. The segment between Ridge Route Road and SR 14 was signed as SR 138, which was defined on a southeasterly course through or paralleling Oakdale and Pine Canyons to meet SR 14 in Palmdale opposite the easterly continuation of Route 138. The planned rerouting was known as the Metropolitan Bypass Freeway. In 1965, because of constructability issues on the proposed realignment of Route 138 through or near Oakdale and Pine Canyons, the proposed junction, and thus the west end of SR 48, was moved east to 170th Street West. In 1996, the segment of SR 48 between 170th Street West and SR 14 was transferred to SR 138, leaving only the unconstructed portion. A locally maintained traversable route is East Avenue E, but Caltrans has no plans to take it over.

Browse numbered routes
← US 48	CA	→ SR 49

=== State Route 64 ===
State Route 64
- Location: Near Malibu Beach–San Fernando

State Route 64 is an unconstructed highway connecting SR 1 near Malibu Beach with I-5 at SR 170 south of San Fernando. It was legislated in 1959 as Route 265, and renumbered Route 64 in 1964. It was proposed as a 30.9-mile freeway. The section from SR 1 to US 101 was deleted from the Freeway and Expressway system on November 23, 1970. The remainder was deleted from the Freeway and Expressway system on January 1, 1976. A locally maintained traversable route is Las Virgenes Road/Malibu Canyon Road, Bell Canyon Fire Road, Saddlebow Road, Bell Canyon Road, Valley Circle Boulevard, Roscoe Boulevard, and Tuxford Street, but Caltrans has no plans to take it over. The route concept report recommends deletion of the route from the highway system.

Browse numbered routes
← SR 63	CA	→ SR 65

=== State Route 81 ===
State Route 81
- Location: Near Riverside–near Devore

State Route 81 is an entirely unconstructed 30.9-mile (49.7 km) freeway from I-215 southeast of Riverside west and north around the south and west sides of Riverside to I-15 south of Devore. Although the legislation noted that Sierra Avenue is Route 81, it is not signed as Route 81 and doesn't appear to be formally part of the route. The route was defined in 1959 as Legislative Route 276 and renumbered to Route 81 in 1964.

Browse numbered routes
← US 80	CA	→ SR 82

=== State Route 93 ===
State Route 93
- Location: Moraga–Richmond

All of State Route 93 is unconstructed, on a 17.9-mile (28.8 km) route from the proposed SR 77 near Moraga northwest, west, and southwest to I-580 in Richmond. It is Moraga Way, Camino Pablo, San Pablo Dam Road, and an undetermined routing from there, but Caltrans has no plans to take it over. In the 1990s, Richmond officials assembled $200 million in state and local funds to build Richmond Parkway between Interstate 80 and Interstate 580. While it mostly functions as an expressway, parts of Richmond Parkway do not meet state expressway standards. For this reason, Caltrans has refused to take the parkway over and officially designate it as part of SR 93 until these local officials bring it up to the state's standards.

=== State Route 100 ===
State Route 100
- Location: Santa Cruz

State Route 100 (SR 100) is a completely unconstructed beachfront loop in Santa Cruz, stretching 4.5 miles (7.2 km) from SR 1 west of downtown to SR 1 near SR 17. It was proposed as a freeway, but in August 1975, the freeway was canceled due to local opposition.

Browse numbered routes
← SR 99	CA	→ US 101

=== State Route 102 ===
State Route 102
- Location: Near Sacramento–near Auburn

State Route 102 is a 37.5-mile (60.4 km) unconstructed freeway that would generally parallel I-80, beginning at I-5 near SR 99 north of Sacramento and heading east across I-80 and northeast to I-80 near Auburn. It is currently in the design process.

Browse numbered routes
← US 101	CA	→ SR 103

=== State Route 122 ===
State Route 122
- Location: South of Palmdale–west of Barstow

State Route 122 is a completely unconstructed 61.3-mile (98.7 km) freeway, defined to run from SR 14 south of Palmdale northeast and east past the east end of proposed SR 48 to SR 58 west of Barstow. A locally maintained traversable route is along Pearblossom Highway, SR 138, and 50th Street East, but Caltrans has no plans to take it over.

Browse numbered routes
← SR 121	CA	→ SR 123

=== State Route 143 ===
State Route 143
- Location: Near Elk Grove–near Carmichael

State Route 143 is a 19.7-mile (31.7 km) unconstructed highway of Sacramento, beginning at SR 99 near Elk Grove and ending at the east end of SR 244 near Carmichael. In 1994, it extended north, replacing a section of SR 244, to Auburn Boulevard. It was proposed as a freeway, but that was canceled in 1975 due to opposition. The existing arterials Grant Line Road and Bradshaw Road approximating the route are currently utilized, and in 2002 Caltrans recommended removing the route definition from the state highway system (but this never appeared to happen).

Browse numbered routes
← SR 142	CA	→ SR 144

=== State Route 148 ===
State Route 148
- Location: Sacramento County

State Route 148 is an unconstructed highway of Sacramento, stretching 16.3 miles (26.2 km) from I-5 east to proposed SR 65. It was proposed as a freeway, but that was canceled in 1975 due to opposition. The City of Sacramento proposed Cosumnes River Boulevard and Calvine Road for this highway. In 2002, Caltrans recommended removing the route definition from the state highway system, but this has yet to happen. In 2010, local Sacramento agencies brought the corridor back as the Capital SouthEast Connector. Phase I is projected to be completed by 2025, with phase II around 2030–40, but Caltrans has no plans to take it over.

=== State Route 179 ===
State Route 179
- Location: Near Vacaville–near Lake Berryessa

State Route 179 is a 13.8-mile (22.2 km) routing along Cherry Glen and Pleasants Valley Roads, connecting I-80 near Vacaville with SR 128 near Lake Berryessa.

Browse numbered routes
← SR 178	CA	→ SR 180

=== State Route 181 ===
State Route 181
- Location: Near Forestville–near Santa Rosa

State Route 181 is an entirely unconstructed 9.5-mile (15.3 km) route, from SR 116 near Forestville to US 101 north of Santa Rosa. A locally maintained traversable route has been defined via Mirabel Road and River Road, but Caltrans has no plans to take it over.

Browse numbered routes
← SR 180	CA	→ SR 182

=== State Route 230 ===
State Route 230
- Location: San Francisco and San Mateo counties

State Route 230 is a 4.1-mile (6.6 km) completely unconstructed route in southeastern San Francisco and San Mateo counties, linking US 101 with I-280 along the San Francisco Bay. Except for the southern end, the route was part of SR 87 until 1970, when SR 87 was canceled north of SR 237. Some of the plans for a Southern Crossing across the bay would have used SR 230. It was proposed as a freeway, but the freeway option was canceled on October 21, 1976 due to opposition.

Browse numbered routes
← SR 229	CA	→ SR 231

=== State Routes 234 and 235 ===
State Route 234 and State Route 235 are unconstructed southern and northern bypasses of Stockton, each linking I-5 with SR 99. Caltrans has no plans to build either, but has identified locally maintained traversable routes: French Camp Road for the 3.4-mile (5.5 km) SR 234, and Eight Mile Road for the 6.4-mile (10.3 km) SR 235. However, one Caltrans map makes the route of SR 234 appear to be Arch-Airport Road. On November 29, 1993, San Joaquin County adopted Eight Mile Road as an arterial highway and dropped interest in it as a state highway.

Browse numbered routes
← SR 233	CA	→ SR 236

=== State Route 239 ===
State Route 239
- Location: Near Tracy–near Brentwood

State Route 239 is a 17-mile (27.4 km) unconstructed route that would link I-580 at I-205 west of Tracy with SR 4 near Brentwood. Caltrans has identified Mountain House Road and Byron Highway (CR J4) as a traversable route, but has no plans to maintain it. In 2005, the federal legislation known as SAFETEA-LU provided $14 million for the purpose of studying the route's corridor and funding its construction. The spur of the Mid-State Tollway, if built, will most likely be designated as SR 239, while the main tollway will most likely be designated as SR 84.

Browse numbered routes
← SR 238	CA	→ SR 241

=== State Route 249 ===
State Route 249
- Location: Near La Cañada Flintridge– near Palmdale

State Route 249 is a 13.5-mile (21.7 km) unconstructed route that would connect SR 2 north of La Cañada Flintridge with SR 14 south of Palmdale. Angeles Forest Highway follows the general alignment, but Caltrans has no plans to take it over. However, there are plans to explore the building of this route between Palmdale and Los Angeles tunneling through the mountains.

Browse numbered routes
← SR 247	CA	→ SR 250

=== State Route 251 ===
State Route 251
- Location: San Quentin–near Point Reyes Station

State Route 251 is a completely unconstructed route, defined to extend from I-580 near San Quentin to SR 1 near Point Reyes Station. The 1.6-mile (2.6 km) portion east of US 101 was defined in 1959 to be Legislative Route 251 and it kept its number. This section was proposed by Caltrans to be improved and signed as SR 251, but that never happened. Now Caltrans has no plans to take over that section. The rest was the proposed 22.9-mile (36.9 km) Point Reyes Freeway, and was part of SR 17 until 1984, when SR 17 over the Richmond-San Rafael Bridge became I-580.

Sir Francis Drake Boulevard roughly parallels the highway's length. If built, the highway was probably going to be called the "Point Reyes Freeway"; extra flyover ramps at the Sir Francis Drake Boulevard-U.S. 101 interchange suggest this.

The freeway was born due to an idea to develop west Marin County, a traditionally rural area, into a sprawling area not usually found in Marin County. With all the new residents, local roads would have been overburdened. Chief among them was Sir Francis Drake Boulevard, a two lane road from Olema to Fairfax before widening to 4 lanes as it passes through the Ross Valley.

However, the development and freeway planning were stopped due to concerns about fragile ecosystems that urbanization would have damaged or destroyed. The animals, mostly egrets and the California red-legged frog, ended up being the main reason the freeway and redevelopment was defeated. There was another problem though: the plan put the entire area on the San Andreas Fault. The decision to not redevelop West Marin made the freeway unnecessary, and it was therefore scrapped. Now, this section is Sir Francis Drake Boulevard, but Caltrans has no plans to take it over.

=== State Route 257 ===
State Route 257
- Location: Near Port Hueneme and Oxnard

State Route 257 is a proposed 19.6-mile (31.5 km) freeway from a proposed relocation of SR 34 east of Port Hueneme west and northwest around Oxnard to US 101 near Ventura. 5th Street and Harbor Boulevard has been identified as a traversable routing, but Caltrans has no plans to maintain the streets. It is proposed to be upgraded to a freeway.

Browse numbered routes
← SR 256	CA	→ SR 258

=== State Route 258 ===
State Route 258
- Location: Torrance–Hollywood

State Route 258 is an unconstructed route which stretches 17 miles (27.4 km) along Western Avenue from the north end of SR 213 at I-405 near Torrance north to US 101 near Hollywood. It is proposed to be upgraded to a freeway, but Caltrans has no plans to take it over, and thus that segment of Western Avenue remains in local control. The route concept report recommends that the alignment of the route be moved 3.5 mi westerly, and it to be from I-405 near LAX to US 101 near Hollywood.

Browse numbered routes
← SR 257	CA	→ SR 259

=== State Route 276 ===
State Route 276
- Location: Three Rivers–Sequoia National Park

State Route 276 is an 8.5-mile (13.7 km) unconstructed route from SR 198 near Three Rivers east to Sequoia National Park. It initially stretched further east through the park (though it was not part of the park at the time) to Mineral King, where the Walt Disney Company planned to build a recreational development. It was truncated to its current terminus in 1972. A route has been adopted. A locally maintained traversable route is Mineral King Road, or county road MTN 375, but it is not recommended for Caltrans to take it over, as this road features narrow, winding, steep grades.

Browse numbered routes
← SR 273	CA	→ I-280

== Partially unconstructed ==
The following California state highways are partially unconstructed. Caltrans has not yet adopted particularly segments of these highways that are listed in state law.

=== State Route 11 ===
State Route 11
- Location: Unconstructed segment in San Diego

State Route 11 (SR 11) is a planned 3-mile (4.8 km) tolled route, running southeast from near the junction of SR 905 and SR 125 to a future Mexican border crossing east of Otay Mesa. The first phase of the highway from SR 905 to Enrico Fermi Drive opened on March 19, 2016. The second phase of the highway from Enrico Fermi Drive to Otay Mesa Drive opened in August 2025.

=== State Route 12 ===
State Route 12
- Location: Unconstructed: near Bodega Bay–Sebastopol

The westernmost 9.2 miles (14.8 km) of State Route 12 are unconstructed, from SR 116 in Sebastopol west to SR 1. This would be today's Bodega Highway and Freestone-Valley Ford Road, but Caltrans has no plans to take them over.

=== State Route 13 ===
State Route 13
- Location: Unconstructed segment in Oakland

The south end of State Route 13 is unconstructed, extending 4.5 miles (7.2 km) beyond I-580 to SR 61 near the Oakland International Airport. A very short piece at the north end has also not been built, extending west into the San Francisco Bay to the unconstructed SR 61 freeway.

=== State Route 14 ===
State Route 14
- Location: Unconstructed: Santa Monica–Los Angeles

A 21.8-mile (35.1 km) extension of State Route 14 from the Newhall Pass interchange with I-5 south to SR 1 northwest of Santa Monica was once proposed as the Reseda Freeway. The postmiles on the existing alignment reflect the existence of this unconstructed segment, but the new exit numbers on State Route 14 suggest this segment has been abandoned. The section between US 101 and SR 118 would be Reseda Boulevard, but Caltrans has no plans to take it over.

=== State Route 18 ===
State Route 18
- Location: Unconstructed segment in San Bernardino

State Route 18 is unconstructed from its end at SR 210 in San Bernardino south to I-10, a distance of 4.1 miles (6.6 km). This section would be Waterman Avenue, but Caltrans has no plans to take it over.

=== State Route 24 ===
State Route 24
- Location: Unconstructed: Walnut Creek–Pittsburg

A 15.1-mile (24.3 km) eastern extension of State Route 24 from I-680 at Walnut Creek to SR 4 near Pittsburg is unconstructed. It is today's Ygnacio Valley Road, Kirker Pass Road and Railroad Avenue.

Originally, the route overlapped I-680 through Walnut Creek, and split off and connected to SR 4 in Concord. The route continued along State Route 4 from the current intersection of 242 to the Antioch Bridge, continuing along the river road to Sacramento, currently State Route 160, then continuing north to Woodland, Marysville, Oroville, along the North Fork of the Feather River to a junction with State Route 89 (this segment is currently State Route 70), where it continued dual-numbered with 89 through Quincy. Highway 24 split from 89 near Graeagle, and continued east through Portola east until its terminus at U.S. Route 395. Parts of the same route were also sometimes designated as State Route 84. SR 24 was truncated to I-680 by 1987 and the segment in Concord was renumbered SR 242.

=== State Route 36 ===
State Route 36
- Location: Unconstructed: Near Susanville–near Termo

The eastern segment of State Route 36, stretching 17.0 miles (27.4 km) from SR 139 north of Susanville east to US 395 near Termo, was unconstructed until it was deleted from the legislative definition in 1998. A locally maintained route is S. Grasshopper Road, Westside Road, and Fillman Road, but it was not built on a proper alignment for construction as a state highway, and there were no plans for a freeway or expressway. It was still listed in the 2002 report.

=== State Route 37 ===
State Route 37
- Location: Unconstructed: near Nicasio–Nicasio

An unconstructed 11.2-mile (18.0 km) western extension of State Route 37 runs from US 101 near Novato to SR 1 near Nicasio. A locally maintained traversable route is Point Reyes-Petaluma Road and Novato Boulevard, but Caltrans has no plans to take it over.

=== State Route 39 ===
State Route 39
- Location: Unconstructed: La Habra–Azusa

11.4 miles (18.3 km) of State Route 39 are unconstructed, from Harbor Boulevard and Whittier Avenue in La Habra north to I-10 in Azusa. However, Section 339(c) of the California Streets and Highways Code designates Harbor Boulevard and Azusa Avenue to be on the corridor between the two existing segments. As yet, the California Transportation Commission, as empowered in Section 75(a) of the California Streets and Highways Code, has not adopted the Harbor Boulevard-Azusa Avenue link. It is noted that an END Route 39 sign exists at the intersection of Whittier Boulevard and Harbor Boulevard. In addition, the northernmost 4.5 miles of Route 39, in the Angeles National Forest between 1.8 miles north of Crystal Lake Road and Route 2 at Islip Saddle, have been closed since a 1978 landslide.

=== State Route 47 ===
State Route 47
- Location: Unconstructed segment in Los Angeles

State Route 47 is constructed as a freeway from I-110 in San Pedro east and north to the split with SR 103. The 1.2-mile (1.9 km) segment along Ocean Boulevard is currently being upgraded, and the 7.6-mile (12.2 km) portion along Henry Ford Avenue and Alameda Street north to SR 91 has been upgraded as part of the Alameda Corridor Project, existing as a mostly below-grade surface street. Caltrans has no plans for the remainder of the legislated route, stretching 8.6 miles (13.8 km) north from SR 91 to I-10 near downtown Los Angeles.

=== State Route 56 ===
State Route 56
- Location: Unconstructed segment in Poway

State Route 56 is unconstructed from I-15 east through Poway to SR 67.

=== State Route 57 ===
State Route 57
- Location: Unconstructed: near Huntington Beach–near Santa Ana

A southerly extension of State Route 57, stretching 13.0 miles (20.9 km) from SR 22 near Santa Ana south to SR 1 near Huntington Beach, is unconstructed.

=== State Route 61 ===
State Route 61
- Location: Unconstructed southern segment: Newark–San Leandro; Unconstructed northern segment: Alameda–Albany

A total of 24.3 miles (39.1 km) of State Route 61 are unconstructed, running south from SR 112 near San Leandro to SR 84 near Newark and north from SR 260 in Alameda to I-580 near Albany.

=== State Route 65 ===
State Route 65
- Location: Unconstructed: Exeter–Roseville

Over two-thirds of State Route 65 is a proposed route through the eastern San Joaquin Valley, splitting the maintained route in two. This unconstructed highway stretches 215.9 miles (347.5 km) from SR 198 near Exeter to I-80 in Roseville. It was signed on Sunrise Boulevard with U.S. 50 until 1976. However, with the projected growth of the Central Valley, interest has reemerged in constructing all or part of the unconstructed portion of SR 65, at least as far north as an unconstructed eastern extension of SR 152. There is also another small unconstructed segment at the north end, extending west from its terminus at SR 70 to SR 99.

=== State Route 74 ===
State Route 74
- Location: Unconstructed segment in Palm Desert

The eastern end of State Route 74 from SR 111 in Palm Desert north 5.5 miles (8.9 km) to I-10 was unconstructed until it was relinquished and deleted from the legislative definition in 2013. It was planned on Monterey Avenue.

=== State Route 77 ===
State Route 77
- Location: Unconstructed: Oakland–Lafayette

State Route 77 presently stretches only 0.4 miles (0.6 km) from I-880 northeast to SR 185 in Oakland. A 13.4-mile (21.6 km) extension is unconstructed, running generally northeast to SR 24 near Lafayette. It is to follow 42nd Avenue, High Street, 35th Avenue, Redwood Road, Pinehurst Road, and Canyon Road, and to be a freeway north of SR 93/Moraga Way.

=== State Route 84 ===
State Route 84
- Location: Unconstructed: Livermore–Brentwood

A 13-mile (21 km) piece in the middle of State Route 84 is unconstructed, stretching north from I-580 in Livermore to SR 4 near Brentwood. A traversable route is Vasco Road. The section between SR 4 and SR 12 is concurrent with SR 160. The Mid-State Tollway, if built, will be built from I-680 to SR 4 and will most likely be designated SR 84, and the spur will mostly likely be designated SR 239.

=== State Route 87 ===
State Route 87
- Location: Unconstructed segment in San Jose

An unconstructed northern extension of State Route 87 runs from the present end at US 101 to SR 237 near Alviso. A locally maintained traversable route is Charcot Avenue and North First Street.

It once extended to Interstate 480 (which itself became SR 480 in 1968 and was canceled in 1991) in San Francisco as a proposed highway east of US 101. In 1968, SR 87's north end was truncated to I-280, as the section west of I-280 was transferred to I-80; the old route of I-80 became SR 241, which was canceled in 1972 due to environmental concerns. In 1970, the section from I-280 to SR 230 was transferred to SR 230. The section from SR 230 to SR 238 was canceled due to environmental concerns. In 1980, the section from SR 238 to SR 237 was canceled due to environmental concerns.

=== State Route 90 ===
State Route 90
- Location: Unconstructed: Culver City–La Habra

The central portion of State Route 90 is unsigned or unconstructed, stretching from I-405 east to SR 39. It is Slauson Avenue, Mulberry Drive, La Mirada Boulevard, and Imperial Highway. The route concept report recommends deletion of Route 90 from the state highway system from unsigned or unconstructed Route 258 to the Orange County line (and possibly renumbering one of the sections).

=== State Route 92 ===
State Route 92
- Location: Unconstructed: Hayward, California–Castro Valley

State Route 92 had a 2.2-mile (3.5 km) unconstructed segment from its current terminus at SR 238 to I-580 in Castro Valley until 2015, when that segment was deleted from the legislative definition. A locally maintained traversable route is A Street and Grove Way, which Caltrans has no plans to take over.

=== State Route 104 ===
State Route 104
- Location: Unconstructed: Amador City–Pine Grove

8.3 miles (13.4 km) of State Route 104 are unconstructed, stretching east from SR 49 near Amador City to SR 88 near Pine Grove. It is Ridge Road and Climax Road, and Caltrans is planning to take it over.

=== State Route 108 ===
State Route 108
- Location: Unconstructed: Near Crows Landing–Modesto

A 21.5-mile (34.6 km) extension of State Route 108 is unconstructed, from its present west end at SR 132 in Modesto southwest to I-5 near Crows Landing. This is Crows Landing Road and Fink Road, which the county wants Caltrans to take over, but Caltrans has no plans to do so.

=== State Route 109 ===
State Route 109
- Location: Unconstructed: East Palo Alto

The intended southern segment of State Route 109 along University Avenue within East Palo Alto between U.S. Route 101 and the city's border near Notre Dame Avenue has never been transferred to Caltrans. Section 409(b) of the California Streets and Highways Code mandates that Caltrans will not take over this section until the department and the City of East Palo Alto determine that it is in an "acceptable state of repair". Adopting the segment to the state highway system remains unlikely, as the city announced in 2023 that it proposes to instead make improvements to slow down traffic, make it safer for pedestrians, and cater the design to the desires of residents.

=== State Route 118 ===
State Route 118
- Location: Unconstructed: Sunland–La Cañada Flintridge

A 10.5-mile (16.9 km) eastern segment of State Route 118 is unconstructed, running from I-210 near Sunland east to proposed SR 249 north of La Cañada Flintridge. A locally maintained traversable route is I-210 and Big Tujunga Canyon Road, but Caltrans has no plans to take it over.

=== State Route 125 ===
State Route 125
- Location: Unconstructed: Santee–Poway

The portion of State Route 125 north of SR 52 in Santee is unconstructed, ending at a proposed eastern extension of SR 56 near Poway.

=== State Route 128 ===
State Route 128
- Location: Unconstructed: near Winters–near Davis

The easternmost 10.4-mile (16.7 km) portion of State Route 128 is unconstructed, connecting I-505 near Winters (the current end) with SR 113 near Davis. The 2002 Traversable Highways Report indicates that this segment will be considered for assumption of maintenance after a two-mile section of Russell Boulevard just east of I-505 is reconstructed. Yolo County will improve the roadway as funds permit. However, it is unclear if this ever happened.

=== State Route 130 ===
State Route 130
- Location: Unconstructed: Mount Hamilton–near Patterson

A section of State Route 130 is unconstructed, stretching from the present end at Mount Hamilton to SR 33 near Patterson. A traversable route is along San Antonio Valley Road, Del Puerto Canyon Road, and Sperry Avenue. The County of Santa Clara has posted SR 130 markers along the traversable route within its borders, despite this segment not being maintained by Caltrans.

A proposed freeway path west of San Antonio Valley Road bypassing Mount Hamilton from either to the north toward State Route 237 or to the south toward San Jose's Evergreen district to I-5 was planned but feasibility of the project came into question, however, as constructing a freeway over the Diablo Range near three of its highest peaks (Mount Hamilton included) and across the Calaveras Fault would have been very difficult. The project also faced stiff opposition from taxpayers, environmentalists, residents of the area looking to preserve their area's local charm, and the Lick Observatory. (A freeway through the mountains near the observatory would render it useless due to light pollution.) The freeway plan was quietly abandoned as a result in 2006.

=== State Route 142 ===
State Route 142
- Location: Unconstructed: near Chino–near Upland

The eastern segment of State Route 142, the 9.5-mile (15.3 km) Carbon Canyon Freeway, is unconstructed, running from SR 71 near Chino to SR 210 near Upland

=== State Route 152 ===
State Route 152
- Location: Unconstructed segment near Chowchilla

A 15.1-mile (24.3 km) easterly extension of State Route 152 is unconstructed, connecting the current east end at SR 99 near Chowchilla with proposed SR 65.

=== State Route 162 ===
A 62.9-mile (101.2 km) portion in the middle of State Route 162, between Covelo and Elk Creek, is unconstructed. The traversable route is along Mendocino Pass Road and Alder Springs Road; most of it is through Mendocino National Forest and federally maintained by the U.S. Forest Service as Forest Highway 7.

=== State Route 164 ===
State Route 164
- Location: Unconstructed segment in Pico Rivera

The southernmost 1.4 mile (2.3 km) of State Route 164 is unconstructed, connecting SR 19 with I-605 near Pico Rivera. This section is the proposed Rio Hondo Freeway.

=== State Route 169 ===
State Route 169
- Location: Unconstructed: Klamath Glen–Johnsons

An 18.2-mile (29.3 km) portion in the middle of State Route 169 along the Klamath River is unconstructed, between Klamath Glen and Johnsons. This is due to the flooding. Caltrans has completed a feasibility study for this section.

=== State Route 178 ===
State Route 178
- Location: Unconstructed: near Ridgecrest–Death Valley National Park

56.0 miles (90.1 km) of State Route 178 is unconstructed, from east of Ridgecrest to Death Valley National Park. The "traversable" route is a winding dirt road through mountain passes in a desolate area. It passes through the gunnery range of the China Lake Naval Weapons Center and through the Wingate Wash area (a National Park Service designated wilderness area). The area is not suitable for a state highway, and District 9 recommends it be rerouted or deleted from the state highway system (and one of the sections possibly renumbered).

=== State Route 180 ===
State Route 180
- Location: Unconstructed: near Paicines–Mendota

State Route 180 is unconstructed from its present end at SR 33 in Mendota west to I-5, and from I-5 west to SR 25 near Paicines, a total of 81.2 miles (130.7 km). This would be along Panoche Road, Little Panoche Road, Shields Avenue, Fairfax Avenue, and Belmont Avenue, but Caltrans has no plans to take it over.

=== State Route 190 ===
State Route 190
- Location: Unconstructed: Quaking Aspen–Olancha

The central portion of State Route 190 is unconstructed, stretching 43.0 miles (69.2 km) from Quaking Aspen in the Sequoia National Forest to US 395 at Olancha. On June 25, 1982, deleting the unconstructed section was recommended, but nothing ever happened. District 9 recommends deleting the unconstructed portion (and possibly renumbering one of the sections).

=== State Route 211 ===
State Route 211
- Location: Unconstructed: Rockport–Ferndale

State Route 211 (SR 211), formerly part of SR 1, stretches only 5 miles (8 km) from US 101 near Fernbridge to Ferndale. A locally maintained traversable route, which the state does not plan to take over, continues south from Ferndale for 102.8 miles (165.4 km) along Mattole Road, Wilder Ridge Road, Kings Peak Road, Chemise Mountain Road, and Usal Road to SR 1 near Rockport.

=== State Route 217 ===
State Route 217
- Location: Unconstructed western segment at UCSB

A 5.0-mile (8.0 km) western extension of State Route 217 is unconstructed, leading from the present end at the University of California at Santa Barbara northwest to US 101.

=== State Route 227 ===
State Route 227
- Location: Unconstructed: near Oceano–Arroyo Grande

The southern end of State Route 227 is unconstructed, stretching 1.7 miles (2.7 km) from US 101 in Arroyo Grande to SR 1 east of Oceano. There is no locally maintained traversable route, but there is a proposed routing.

=== State Route 238 ===
State Route 238
- Location: Unconstructed: San Leandro–San Lorenzo

A northern extension of State Route 238 is unconstructed, stretching west 1.6 miles (2.6 km) from the end of I-238 at I-880 to the proposed extension of SR 61 near San Lorenzo.

=== State Route 241 ===
State Route 241
- Location: Unconstructed: near San Clemente–Las Flores

The construction of the south end of State Route 241, from Oso Parkway south to I-5 near San Clemente, was opposed due to environmental concerns but the segment still remains defined under state law. Orange County maintains Los Patrones Parkway that extends the right-of-way south to Rancho Mission Viejo, but local officials do not intend to hand over control of the parkway to the state.

=== State Route 270 ===
State Route 270
- Location: Unconstructed segment in Bodie State Historical Park

The easternmost 3.5 miles (5.6 km) of State Route 270 are unconstructed, being maintained by the California Department of Parks and Recreation inside the Bodie State Historical Park. District 9 recommended that this stretch be deleted from the state highway system.

=== State Route 271 ===
State Route 271
- Location: Unconstructed: Leggett–Reynolds

The central portion of State Route 271 technically remains unconstructed between Leggett and Reynolds. SR 271 runs along a former routing of US 101 in Mendocino and Humboldt counties, while US 101 was realigned onto a freeway bypass. However, the central portion of the bypass between Leggett and Reynolds remains unconstructed due to environmental concerns, and thus the existing highway between the two communities remains part of US 101. SR 271's legislative definition is not broken up into two parts to indicate either the current constructed gap in the route or a US 101/SR 273 concurrency, nor does signage exist along the US 101 marking such a concurrency.

=== State Route 280 ===
State Route 280
- Location: Unconstructed segment in San Francisco

State Route 280 is an unconstructed extension of Interstate 280 from its current north end in San Francisco at King and 5th Streets to Interstate 80. The traversable route along 5th Street is maintained by the city and Caltrans has no plans to take it over. The legal definition however still reads "to Route 80 near First Street", which dates back to plans for I-280 to also connect to the now-demolished Embarcadero Freeway (now-deleted State Route 480) near 1st Street.

=== State Route 281 ===
State Route 281
- Location: Unconstructed: Kelseyville Riviera–Lakeport

The majority of State Route 281 is unconstructed, stretching 14.0 miles (22.5 km) from the current end at Soda Bay Rd in Kelseyville Riviera northwest to SR 29 south of Lakeport. A locally maintained traversable route is Soda Bay Road, and Caltrans is planning to take it over.

=== State Route 380 ===
State Route 380
- Location: Unconstructed: Pacifica–San Bruno

State Route 380, a 4.4-mile (7.1 km) western extension of I-380, was to connect the end of I-380 at I-280 in San Bruno with SR 1 near Pacifica. The freeway was canceled on March 29, 1979. A locally maintained traversable route is along Sneath Lane, Skyline Boulevard and Sharp Park Road, but Caltrans has no plans to take it over.

=== State Route 605 ===
State Route 605
- Location: Unconstructed segment in Seal Beach

State Route 605 is a 3-mile (4.8 km) unconstructed southern extension of I-605 from I-405/SR 22 to SR 1 near Seal Beach. It is roughly along Seal Beach Boulevard but Caltrans has no plans to take it over.

=== State Route 710 ===
State Route 710
- Location: Unconstructed: Alhambra–Pasadena

The 3.5-mile (5.6 km) segment of State Route 710 from Interstate 710 and Valley Boulevard north to California Boulevard in Pasadena (where a freeway stub leading to an interchange with I-210 and SR 134 already exists) has been unconstructed for several decades due to community opposition.

=== State Route 905 ===
State Route 905
- Location: Unconstructed western segment in San Diego

The westernmost segment of the Otay Mesa Freeway, 3.2 miles (5.1 km) from I-5 southwest to the Mexican border is unconstructed, and Caltrans has no plans on pursuing this routing, particularly since there are no plans for a border crossing at this location, and it is an environmentally sensitive area.

== See also ==
- List of deleted state highways in California
