= California postmile =

Location marking system on highways in California, US

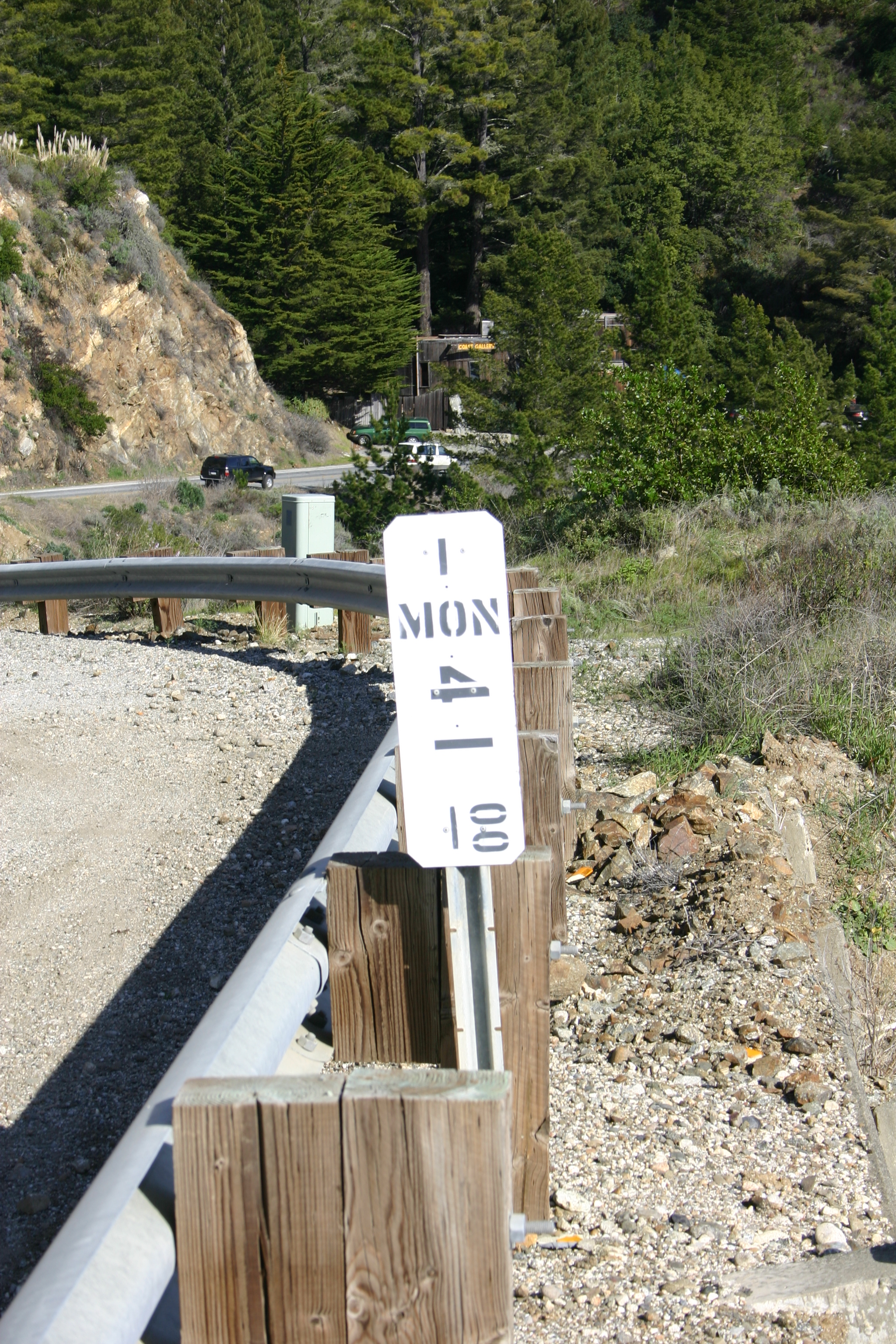
A typical postmile marker on State Route 1 in Monterey County

California uses a postmile highway location marker system on all of its state highways, including U.S. Routes and Interstate Highways. The postmile markers indicate the distance a route travels through individual counties, as opposed to mileposts that indicate the distance traveled through a state. The postmile system is the only route reference system used by the California Department of Transportation (Caltrans). The system was operative by 1966.

California was the last state in the country to adopt mile markers, and exit numbers were not implemented until 2002. The state started the Cal-NExUS program in 2002, which would create a uniform exit numbering system for freeways. Included was a pilot program for the placing of mile markers along rural freeways. Currently, three freeway segments are a part of the experimental program: the Route 14 Freeway, the Route 58 Freeway in Kern County, and State Route 180 in Fresno. Caltrans has not decided if the mile marker program will be expanded to all rural freeways. Regardless, Caltrans will still use and maintain the postmile system on all freeways.

== Official postmile definitions ==
Listed in miles, postmile values usually increase from south to north or west to east depending upon the general direction the route follows within the state. The postmile values increase from the beginning of a route within a county to the next county line. The postmile values start over again at each county line.

Enforcement officers, maintenance forces and others use the postmile markers in the field to locate specific incidents or features with reference to the postmile system.

On some stretches of road, the following prefixes may precede the mileage on a postmile marker:

Prefix	Description
R	Realignment
M	Realignment of a prior realignment
N	Realignment of M mileage
C	Commercial lanes paralleling main highway
D	Duplication (usually due to a meandering county line)
G	Reposting duplicate PM at end of route
H	Realignment of duplication
T	Temporary connection
S	Spur
L	Overlap due to correction or change

A postmile may also include a milepost equation.

== Format ==
A postmile marker is placed along the state highway. Each marker is stenciled with the route, county, and postmile at that location.

=== Bridge ===
One of the common formats for postmiles are located on a freeway on bridges over cross streets. According to Caltrans, it displays the name of the bridge, the county and route number, and the postmile. The postmile is often painted onto the piers and/or abutments of bridges and overpasses.

=== Postmile markers ===
These are the white metal paddle markers placed at one-mile intervals, with additional markers placed at significant features along the highway such as bridges and overpasses, junctions, or culverts. The markers are roughly the same size as a standard milepost used elsewhere, but they are white with black text. These markers also indicate turnouts and cross streets ahead.

=== Callbox ===
Postmiles are also shown on callboxes. A blue placard is mounted on each of the state's callboxes: the top shows which county the callbox is in, and the bottom shows the 2-letter county abbreviation along with the route number and the location's postmile (in tenths of miles). Postmiles on callboxes are approximate due to a convention that all callboxes on the northbound or eastbound side of a divided roadway are assigned even numbers while all those on the southbound or westbound side are assigned odd numbers, even though the call boxes are often located directly across from one another.

==== County prefixes ====
Alphabetic prefixes on postmile markers and bridges differ from callbox prefixes because the callbox system is maintained by each county, while Caltrans maintains postmile markers and bridge signs. The following table lists postmile and callbox prefixes by county.

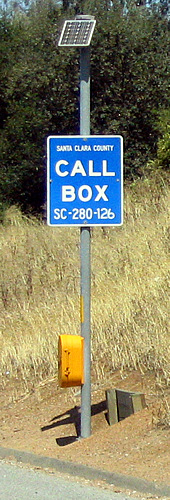
Postmile SC 12.6 labeled on a callbox for I-280 in Santa Clara County

County	Bridge	Callbox	County	Bridge	Callbox
Alameda	ALA	AL	Orange	ORA	OR
Alpine	ALP	AP	Placer	PLA	PL
Amador	AMA	AM	Plumas	PLU	PM
Butte	BUT	BU	Riverside	RIV	RV
Calaveras	CAL	CV	Sacramento	SAC	SA
Colusa	COL	CO	San Benito	SBT	ST
Contra Costa	CC	CC	San Bernardino	SBD	SB
Del Norte	DN	DN	San Diego	SD	SD
El Dorado	ED	EL	San Francisco	SF	SF
Fresno	FRE	FR	San Joaquin	SJ	SJ
Glenn	GLE	GL	San Luis Obispo	SLO	SL
Humboldt	HUM	HU	San Mateo	SM	SM
Imperial	IMP	IM	Santa Barbara	SB	SR
Inyo	INY	IN	Santa Clara	SCL	SC
Kern	KER	KR	Santa Cruz	SCR	SZ
Kings	KIN	KN	Shasta	SHA	SH
Lake	LAK	LK	Sierra	SIE	SI
Lassen	LAS	LS	Siskiyou	SIS	SK
Los Angeles	LA	LA	Solano	SOL	SO
Madera	MAD	MD	Sonoma	SON	SN
Marin	MRN	MR	Stanislaus	STA	SS
Mariposa	MPA	MP	Sutter	SUT	SU
Mendocino	MEN	MC	Tehama	TEH	TE
Merced	MER	ME	Trinity	TRI	TR
Modoc	MOD	MO	Tulare	TUL	TU
Mono	MNO	MN	Tuolumne	TUO	TM
Monterey	MON	MY	Ventura	VEN	VE
Napa	NAP	NP	Yolo	YOL	YO
Nevada	NEV	NV	Yuba	YUB	YB

== Similar reference markers in other jurisdictions ==
Sonoma County uses a postmile system on its county roads, but the numbering usually starts at 10.00 rather than at a zero point.

Los Angeles County uses a postmile system similar to the state’s, but their postmile markers contain a red bar on its top

The states of Nevada and Ohio use reference markers very similar to California's postmile markers. Like California, these two states record mileages through individual counties in their respective route logs. Ohio's system is nearly identical to California's with its reference markers listing the route number, 3-letter county abbreviation, and mileage through the county. The Nevada system is also similar, utilizing 2-letter county abbreviations. However, Ohio uses standard mileposts in addition to reference markers on freeways, while Nevada uses standard mileposts in conjunction with postmile panels on Interstate highways only.

Also, all non-Interstates in Illinois and Kentucky have markers showing mileage from the western or southern border of the county.

== See also ==
- Milestone
- Reference marker (New York)
