= Teviston =

Teviston may refer to:

- Teviston, former name of Bowie, Arizona
- Teviston, California
