= Idlewild, Tulare County, California =

Idlewild
- census-designated place
- Location in Tulare County and the state of California

- Position in California.
- Coordinates: 35°48′35″N 118°40′14″W
- Country: United States
- State: California
- County: Tulare

Area
  - Total: 0.459 sq mi (1.190 km^{2})
  - Land: 0.459 sq mi (1.190 km^{2})
  - Water: 0 sq mi (0 km^{2}) 0%
- Elevation: 3,766 ft (1,148 m)

Population (2020)
  - Total: 32
  - Density: 70/sq mi (27/km^{2})
- Time zone: UTC-8 (Pacific (PST))
  - Summer (DST): UTC-7 (PDT)
- GNIS feature ID: 2585425

Idlewild is a census-designated place (CDP) in Tulare County, California, United States. Idlewild sits at an elevation of 3,766 feet (1,148 m). The 2020 United States census reported Idlewild's population as 32, down from 43 at the 2010 census.

== Geography ==
According to the United States Census Bureau, the CDP covers an area of 0.5 square mile (1.2 km^{2}), all land.

== Demographics ==
Historical population
Census	Pop.	Note	%±
2010	43		—
2020	32		−25.6%
U.S. Decennial Census; 1850–1870 1880-1890; 1900 1910 1920; 1930 1940 1950; 1960 1970 1980; 1990 2000 2010

Idlewild first appeared as a census designated place in the 2010 U.S. census.

The 2020 United States census reported that Idlewild had a population of 32. Of the residents, 31 were White, 1 was Native American, and none were Hispanic or Latino.

There were 7 households, which were all families. The median age was 64.0 years.

There were 34 housing units, of which 7 were occupied year round, all by homeowners. The other 27 housing units were used seasonally.

== Education ==
Idlewild is served by the Linns Valley-Poso Flat Union School District and by the Porterville Unified School District for grades 9–12.
