= Pine Flat, California =

Pine Flat
- census-designated place
- Position in California.
- Coordinates: 35°52′25″N 118°38′33″W
- Country: United States
- State: California
- County: Tulare

Area
  - Total: 1.000 sq mi (2.591 km^{2})
  - Land: 1.000 sq mi (2.589 km^{2})
  - Water: 0.00077 sq mi (0.002 km^{2}) 0.08%
- Elevation: 3,871 ft (1,180 m)

Population (2020)
  - Total: 206
  - Density: 206/sq mi (79.6/km^{2})
- Time zone: UTC-8 (Pacific (PST))
  - Summer (DST): UTC-7 (PDT)
- GNIS feature ID: 2585438

Pine Flat is a census-designated place (CDP) in Tulare County, California, United States. Pine Flat sits at an elevation of 3,871 feet (1,180 m). The 2020 United States census reported Pine Flat's population was 206, up from 166 at the 2010 census.

== Geography ==
According to the United States Census Bureau, the CDP covers an area of 1.0 square mile (2.6 km^{2}), all land.

== Demographics ==
Historical population
Census	Pop.	Note	%±
2010	166		—
2020	206		24.1%
U.S. Decennial Census; 1850–1870 1880-1890; 1900 1910 1920; 1930 1940 1950; 1960 1970 1980; 1990 2000 2010

Pine Flat first appeared as a census designated place in the 2010 U.S. census.

The 2020 United States census reported that Pine Flat had a population of 206. The population density was 206.2 inhabitants per square mile (79.6/km^{2}). The racial makeup of Pine Flat was 173 (84.0%) White, 0 (0.0%) African American, 12 (5.8%) Native American, 4 (1.9%) Asian, 0 (0.0%) Pacific Islander, 2 (1.0%) from other races, and 15 (7.3%) from two or more races. Hispanic or Latino of any race were 6 persons (2.9%).

The whole population lived in households. There were 96 households, out of which 22 (22.9%) had children under the age of 18 living in them, 59 (61.5%) were married-couple households, 4 (4.2%) were cohabiting couple households, 17 (17.7%) had a female householder with no partner present, and 16 (16.7%) had a male householder with no partner present. 15 households (15.6%) were one person, and 12 (12.5%) were one person aged 65 or older. The average household size was 2.15. There were 76 families (79.2% of all households).

The age distribution was 24 people (11.7%) under the age of 18, 8 people (3.9%) aged 18 to 24, 45 people (21.8%) aged 25 to 44, 43 people (20.9%) aged 45 to 64, and 86 people (41.7%) who were 65 years of age or older. The median age was 59.4 years. There were 121 males and 85 females.

There were 263 housing units at an average density of 263.3 units per square mile (101.7 units/km^{2}), of which 96 (36.5%) were occupied. Of these, 68 (70.8%) were owner-occupied, and 28 (29.2%) were occupied by renters.

== Education ==
Pine Flat is served by the Hot Springs Elementary School District and by the Porterville Unified School District for grades 9–12.
