= Hartland, California =

Hartland
- census-designated place
- Location of Hartland in Tulare County, California.

- Position in California.
- Coordinates: 36°39′07″N 118°57′19″W
- Country: United States
- State: California
- County: Tulare

Area
  - Total: 0.231 sq mi (0.598 km^{2})
  - Land: 0.231 sq mi (0.598 km^{2})
  - Water: 0 sq mi (0 km^{2}) 0%
- Elevation: 4,475 ft (1,364 m)

Population (2020)
  - Total: 69
  - Density: 300/sq mi (120/km^{2})
- Time zone: UTC-8 (Pacific (PST))
  - Summer (DST): UTC-7 (PDT)
- GNIS feature ID: 2585423

Hartland is a census-designated place (CDP) in Tulare County, California, United States. Hartland sits at an elevation of 4,475 feet (1,364 m). The 2020 United States census reported Hartland's population was 69.

== Geography ==
According to the United States Census Bureau, the CDP covers an area of 0.2 square mile (0.6 km^{2}), all land.

== History ==
Hartland was named for two of the first pioneer settlers of the area, William Michael Hart, and his wife, Sarah Matilda Land. Hart and Land traveled by covered wagon to California sometime in the early 1850s. All five of their daughters, and one son were born in the Angel's Camp gold-mining area, where the Harts operated a small school for the Angel's camp miners' children. The 1870s saw the family living down south in the Tulare Co. towns of Venice, Kaweah & Mineral King (at the edge of the King's Canyon National Park), Orosi, Squaw Valley, and finally Eshom Valley in the 1880s. The town of Hartland was named for the couple, as a composite of both their last names.

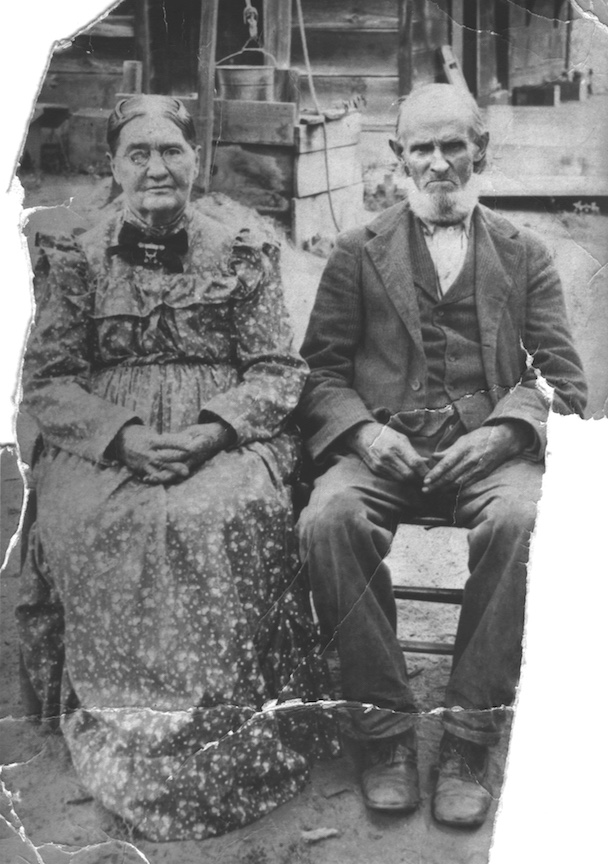
A photo of Wm. Michael Hart and his wife Sarah M. Land-Hart, at their home in Eshom Valley, CA.

== Demographics ==
Historical population
| Census | Pop. | Note | %± |
|---|---|---|---|
| 2010 | 30 | | — |
| 2020 | 69 | | 130.0% |
U.S. Decennial Census; 1850–1870 1880-1890; 1900 1910 1920; 1930 1940 1950; 1960 1970 1980; 1990 2000 2010

Hartland first appeared as a census designated place in the 2010 U.S. census.

The 2020 United States census reported that Hartland had a population of 69. All residents were White and not Hispanic or Latino.

There were 13 households, of which 11 were families and 1 was one person living alone. The median age was 38.1 years.

There were 40 housing units, of which 13 were occupied, all by renters, and 26 were used seasonally.

== Education ==
Hartland is served by the Cutler-Orosi Joint Unified School District.
