= Panorama Heights, Tulare County, California =

Panorama Heights
- census-designated place
- Location in Tulare County and the state of California

- Position in California.
- Coordinates: 35°48′24″N 118°37′37″W
- Country: United States
- State: California
- County: Tulare

Area
  - Total: 0.475 sq mi (1.230 km^{2})
  - Land: 0.475 sq mi (1.230 km^{2})
  - Water: 0 sq mi (0 km^{2}) 0%
- Elevation: 5,043 ft (1,537 m)

Population (2020)
  - Total: 44
  - Density: 93/sq mi (36/km^{2})
- Time zone: UTC-8 (Pacific (PST))
  - Summer (DST): UTC-7 (PDT)
- GNIS feature ID: 2585435

Panorama Heights is a census-designated place (CDP) in Tulare County, California, United States. Panorama Heights sits at an elevation of 5,043 feet (1,537 m). The 2020 United States census reported Panorama Heights' population as 44, up from 41 at the 2010 census.

== Geography ==
According to the United States Census Bureau, the CDP covers an area of 0.5 square mile (1.2 km^{2}), all land.

=== Climate ===
Climate data for Posey 3E, California
Month	Jan	Feb	Mar	Apr	May	Jun	Jul	Aug	Sep	Oct	Nov	Dec	Year
Record high °F (°C)	69 (21)	71 (22)	78 (26)	80 (27)	90 (32)	95 (35)	101 (38)	94 (34)	97 (36)	89 (32)	79 (26)	76 (24)	101 (38)
Mean daily maximum °F (°C)	49 (9)	52 (11)	54 (12)	56 (13)	65 (18)	75 (24)	83 (28)	83 (28)	77 (25)	67 (19)	57 (14)	51 (11)	64 (18)
Mean daily minimum °F (°C)	28 (−2)	30 (−1)	32 (0)	33 (1)	40 (4)	46 (8)	52 (11)	52 (11)	46 (8)	40 (4)	33 (1)	29 (−2)	38 (4)
Record low °F (°C)	5 (−15)	11 (−12)	9 (−13)	15 (−9)	21 (−6)	28 (−2)	34 (1)	36 (2)	31 (−1)	16 (−9)	9 (−13)	1 (−17)	1 (−17)
Average precipitation inches (mm)	5.11 (130)	4.66 (118)	4.52 (115)	3.37 (86)	1.15 (29)	0.30 (7.6)	0.02 (0.51)	0.15 (3.8)	0.60 (15)	1.20 (30)	3.12 (79)	4.80 (122)	29 (735.91)
Average snowfall inches (cm)	9 (23)	8 (20)	7 (18)	5 (13)	0.3 (0.76)	0 (0)	0 (0)	0 (0)	0 (0)	0 (0)	3 (7.6)	9 (23)	41.3 (105.36)
Source: NOAA

== Demographics ==
Historical population
Census	Pop.	Note	%±
2010	41		—
2020	44		7.3%
U.S. Decennial Census; 1850–1870 1880-1890; 1900 1910 1920; 1930 1940 1950; 1960 1970 1980; 1990 2000 2010

Panorama Heights first appeared as a census designated place in the 2010 U.S. census.

The 2020 United States census reported that Panorama Heights had a population of 44. The population density was 92.6 inhabitants per square mile (35.8/km^{2}). The racial makeup of Panorama Heights was 37 (84%) White, 0 (0%) African American, 0 (0%) Native American, 1 (2%) Asian, 0 (0%) Pacific Islander, 2 (5%) from other races, and 4 (9%) from two or more races. Hispanic or Latino of any race were 5 persons (11%).

There were 26 households, and the average household size was 1.69.

The age distribution was 7 people (16%) under the age of 18, 2 people (5%) aged 18 to 24, 6 people (14%) aged 25 to 44, 14 people (32%) aged 45 to 64, and 15 people (34%) who were 65 years of age or older. The median age was 55.0 years.

There were 154 housing units at an average density of 324.2 units per square mile (125.2 units/km^{2}), of which 26 (17%) were occupied year round and 123 (80%) were used seasonally. Of the occupied housing units, 22 (85%) were owner-occupied, and 4 (15%) were occupied by renters.

== Education ==
Panorama Heights is served by the Linns Valley-Poso Flat Union School District and by the Porterville Unified School District for grades 9–12.
