= Sugarloaf Mountain Park, California =

Sugarloaf Mountain Park
- census-designated place
- Position in California.
- Coordinates: 35°50′17″N 118°36′14″W
- Country: United States
- State: California
- County: Tulare

Area
  - Total: 0.106 sq mi (0.274 km^{2})
  - Land: 0.106 sq mi (0.274 km^{2})
  - Water: 0 sq mi (0 km^{2}) 0%
- Elevation: 5,991 ft (1,826 m)

Population (2010)
  - Total: 0
  - Density: 0.0/sq mi (0.0/km^{2})
- Time zone: UTC-8 (Pacific (PST))
  - Summer (DST): UTC-7 (PDT)
- GNIS feature ID: 2585450

Sugarloaf Mountain Park is a former census-designated place (CDP) in Tulare County, California. Sugarloaf Mountain Park sits at an elevation of 5,991 feet (1,826 m). The CDP was first listed in the 2010 U.S. census although with zero population.

== Geography ==
According to the United States Census Bureau, the CDP covers an area of 0.1 square miles (0.3 km^{2}), all of it land.

== Demographics ==
Historical population
Census	Pop.	Note	%±
2010	0		—
U.S. Decennial Census; 1850–1870 1880-1890; 1900 1910 1920; 1930 1940 1950; 1960 1970 1980; 1990 2000 2010

Sugarloaf Mountain Park first appeared as a census designated place in the 2010 U.S. census. The CDP was deleted prior to the 2020 U.S. census.
