= Sequoia Crest, California =

Sequoia Crest
- census-designated place
- Location in Tulare County and the state of California

- Position in California.
- Coordinates: 36°11′09″N 118°37′32″W
- Country: United States
- State: California
- County: Tulare

Area
  - Total: 1.022 sq mi (2.647 km^{2})
  - Land: 1.022 sq mi (2.647 km^{2})
  - Water: 0 sq mi (0 km^{2}) 0%
- Elevation: 7,008 ft (2,136 m)

Population (2020)
  - Total: 24
  - Density: 23/sq mi (9.1/km^{2})
- Time zone: UTC-8 (Pacific (PST))
  - Summer (DST): UTC-7 (PDT)
- GNIS feature ID: 2585447

Sequoia Crest is a census-designated place (CDP) in Tulare County, California, United States. The community of Sequoia Crest contains more than 150 Giant Sequoias scattered throughout the subdivision. Sequoia Crest sits at an elevation of 7,008 feet (2,136 m). The 2020 United States census reported Sequoia Crest's population was 24, up from 10 at the 2010 census. Sequoia Crest can be reached from Porterville by 41 curvy miles, most on California State Route 190, with an elevation gain of 6,549 feet.

== History ==
Before California became a state, the Yokuts Indians made summer camp in nearby Hossack Meadow.

The one-square-mile section that includes Sequoia Crest was created as a “school section” first purchased for $1.25 an acre under the “Timber and Stone Act of 1878”. School sections were sections of land sold by the government to finance the construction and operation of schools in the late 1800s. The “school section” was about 20 acres (8.1 ha) larger than the standard survey section of one square mile. In 1944 the section was purchased by Claud Rouch as a potential timber and logging operation. His son “Sonny” Rouch built the first road into Sequoia Crest to facilitate logging operations after WWII. Rouch took out an estimated 40 million board feet of timber. However, he did not harvest Giant Sequoias, leaving them for future generations to admire.

The Sequoia Crest subdivision began in 1955 on 200 of the 670 acres (270 ha) of the section. A water system was developed by Rouch and serves all properties within the subdivision. Approximately 100 homes have been constructed to date.

=== Stagg Tree and Alder Grove acquisition ===
On December 30, 2019, Save The Redwoods completed the purchase of the Alder Grove containing the Stagg Tree with the intent of eventually donating the property to the Giant Sequoia National Monument. The Stagg Tree is the fifth-largest Giant Sequoia, as measured by trunk volume. The Stagg Tree, formerly the largest Giant Sequoia on private land, is accessible to visitors at the intersection of Alder Drive and Redwood Drive.

=== Sequoia Complex Fire ===
On September 13, 2020, nearly half of the homes in Sequoia Crest burned down in the SQF Complex / Castle Fire. According to Tulare County records, 49 houses were completely destroyed, 2 were damaged, and 56 sustained no damage. Infrastructure and utility buildings were also damaged or destroyed. In the nearby communities of Alpine Village and Cedar Slope, 37 homes and 57 houses were destroyed by the fire, respectively, with only a few homes left standing. The Alder Creek Grove of sequoias (where Sequoia Crest is located) was heavily damaged, about one-third of it severely. The Stagg Tree was not impacted by the fire.

== Geography ==
Sequoia Crest is surrounded on all sides by the Giant Sequoia National Monument, Sequoia National Forest and the Golden Trout Wilderness. Wildlife—such as bears, mountain lions, foxes, coyotes and other animals common to the wilderness—are often seen passing through the area.

According to the United States Census Bureau, the CDP covers an area of 1.0 square mile (2.6 km^{2}), all land.

=== Climate ===
Sequoia Crest is the only residential subdivision located entirely within a Sequoia Grove (the Alder Creek Grove). The subdivision lies at an altitude of between 6500 and 7000 feet. Snow falls frequently in winter and contributes to the annual High Sierra snowpack. Summers are mild, but like all Sierra communities sudden changes in weather, including hail or snow, may occur at any time.

== Demographics ==
Historical population
Census	Pop.	Note	%±
2010	10		—
2020	24		140.0%
U.S. Decennial Census; 1850–1870 1880-1890; 1900 1910 1920; 1930 1940 1950; 1960 1970 1980; 1990 2000 2010

Sequoia Crest first appeared as a census designated place in the 2010 U.S. census.

The 2010 United States census reported that Sequoia Crest had a population of 10. The population density was 9.8 inhabitants per square mile (3.8/km^{2}). The racial makeup of Sequoia Crest was 10 (100.0%) White. Hispanic or Latino of any race were 0 persons (0.0%).

The Census reported that 10 people (100% of the population) lived in households, 0 (0%) lived in non-institutionalized group quarters, and 0 (0%) were institutionalized.

There were 6 households, out of which 1 (16.7%) had children under the age of 18 living in them, 2 (33.3%) were opposite-sex married couples living together, 1 (16.7%) had a female householder with no husband present, 0 (0%) had a male householder with no wife present. There were 0 (0%) unmarried opposite-sex partnerships, and 0 (0%) same-sex married couples or partnerships. 3 households (50.0%) were made up of individuals, and 2 (33.3%) had someone living alone who was 65 years of age or older. The average household size was 1.67. There were 3 families (50.0% of all households); the average family size was 2.33.

The population was spread out, with 2 people (20.0%) under the age of 18, 0 people (0%) aged 18 to 24, 1 people (10.0%) aged 25 to 44, 3 people (30.0%) aged 45 to 64, and 4 people (40.0%) who were 65 years of age or older. The median age was 64.5 years. For every 100 females, there were 150.0 males. For every 100 females age 18 and over, there were 100.0 males.

There were 95 housing (reduced to 56 by SQF Fire in 2020) units at an average density of 93.0 per square mile (35.9/km^{2}), of which 5 (83.3%) were owner-occupied, and 1 (16.7%) were occupied by renters. The homeowner vacancy rate was 16.7%; the rental vacancy rate was 0%. 9 people (90.0% of the population) lived in owner-occupied housing units and 1 people (10.0%) lived in rental housing units.

== Access and infrastructure ==
Sequoia Crest is accessed by Redwood Drive, an all-weather road, connecting to State Highway 190. The County of Tulare plows the road daily in winter as well as roads within Sequoia Crest. Electricity is provided by Edison. Access to satellite television and internet is spotty due to the density of trees, including Giant Sequoias, that block satellite access on most parcels. Cell phone access is equally limited due to the mountain terrain. Land line service is provided by AT&T. Following the SQF fire, telephone, electrical service, and internet service (Spectrum) were improved and brought to current standards. Cell phone service remains spotty.

The Sequoia Crest Property Owners Association was formed in 1973. Sequoia Crest is primarily a vacation community with the population spiking on summer weekends and year-round holidays. Some homes are occupied full-time.
