= Lindcove, California =

Lindcove
- census-designated place
- Location of Lindcove in Tulare County, California.

- Location within California
- Coordinates: 36°21′28″N 119°03′52″W
- Country: United States
- State: California
- County: Tulare

Area
  - Total: 0.114 sq mi (0.295 km^{2})
  - Land: 0.114 sq mi (0.295 km^{2})
  - Water: 0 sq mi (0 km^{2}) 0%
- Elevation: 453 ft (138 m)

Population (2020)
  - Total: 189
  - Density: 1,660/sq mi (641/km^{2})
- Time zone: UTC-8 (Pacific (PST))
  - Summer (DST): UTC-7 (PDT)
- Area code: 559
- FIPS code: 06-41656
- GNIS feature IDs: 244870; 2585429

Lindcove is a census-designated place in Tulare County, California, United States. The population was 189 at the 2020 census.

== Geography ==
According to the United States Census Bureau, the CDP covers an area of 0.1 square mile (0.3 km^{2}), all land.

In 2010, the CDP was larger, with an area of 0.7 square mile (1.8 km^{2}), all land.

== Demographics ==
Historical population
Census	Pop.	Note	%±
2010	406		—
2020	189		−53.4%
U.S. Decennial Census; 1850–1870 1880-1890; 1900 1910 1920; 1930 1940 1950; 1960 1970 1980; 1990 2000 2010

Lindcove first appeared as a census designated place in the 2010 U.S. census.

The 2020 United States census reported that Lindcove had a population of 189. The population density was 1,657.9 inhabitants per square mile (640.1/km^{2}). The racial makeup of Lindcove was 79 (41.8%) White, 0 (0.0%) African American, 5 (2.6%) Native American, 3 (1.6%) Asian, 0 (0.0%) Pacific Islander, 85 (45.0%) from other races, and 17 (9.0%) from two or more races. Hispanic or Latino of any race were 117 persons (61.9%).

The whole population lived in households. There were 55 households, out of which 32 (58.2%) had children under the age of 18 living in them, 35 (63.6%) were married-couple households, 4 (7.3%) were cohabiting couple households, 2 (3.6%) had a female householder with no partner present, and 14 (25.5%) had a male householder with no partner present. 7 households (12.7%) were one person, and 0 (0.0%) were one person aged 65 or older. The average household size was 3.44. There were 48 families (87.3% of all households).

The age distribution was 47 people (24.9%) under the age of 18, 19 people (10.1%) aged 18 to 24, 45 people (23.8%) aged 25 to 44, 40 people (21.2%) aged 45 to 64, and 38 people (20.1%) who were 65 years of age or older. The median age was 40.2 years. There were 99 males and 90 females.

There were 63 housing units at an average density of 552.6 units per square mile (213.4 units/km^{2}), of which 55 (87.3%) were occupied. Of these, 33 (60.0%) were owner-occupied, and 22 (40.0%) were occupied by renters.

== Education ==
Lindcove is served by the Sequoia Union Elementary School District and by the Exeter Unified School District for grades 9-12.
