= El Rancho, California =

El Rancho
- census-designated place
- Location of El Rancho in Tulare County, California.

- Position in California.
- Coordinates: 36°13′14″N 119°04′08″W
- Country: United States
- State: California
- County: Tulare

Area
  - Total: 0.022 sq mi (0.056 km^{2})
  - Land: 0.022 sq mi (0.056 km^{2})
  - Water: 0 sq mi (0 km^{2}) 0%
- Elevation: 390 ft (120 m)

Population (2020)
  - Total: 96
  - Density: 4,400/sq mi (1,700/km^{2})
- Time zone: UTC-8 (Pacific (PST))
  - Summer (DST): UTC-7 (PDT)
- GNIS feature ID: 2585422

El Rancho is a census-designated place (CDP) in Tulare County, California, United States. El Rancho sits at an elevation of 390 feet (120 m). The 2020 United States census reported El Rancho's population as 96.

== Geography ==
According to the United States Census Bureau, the CDP covers an area of 0.02 square mile (0.06 km^{2}), all land.

== Demographics ==
Historical population
Census	Pop.	Note	%±
2010	124		—
2020	96		−22.6%
U.S. Decennial Census; 1850–1870 1880-1890; 1900 1910 1920; 1930 1940 1950; 1960 1970 1980; 1990 2000 2010

El Rancho first appeared as a census designated place in the 2010 U.S. census.

The 2020 United States census reported that El Rancho had a population of 96. The racial makeup of El Rancho was 22 (23%) White, 1 (1%) African American, 6 (6%) Native American, 0 (0%) Asian, 1 (1%) Pacific Islander, 51 (53%) from other races, and 15 (16%) from two or more races. Hispanic or Latino of any race were 85 persons (89%).

The whole population lived in households. There were 26 households, out of which 9 (35%) had children under the age of 18 living in them, 4 (15%) were married-couple households, 3 (12%) were cohabiting couple households, 5 (19%) had a female householder with no partner present, and 14 (54%) had a male householder with no partner present. 6 households (23%) were one person, and 3 (12%) were one person aged 65 or older. The average household size was 3.69. There were 17 families (65% of all households).

The age distribution was 30 people (31%) under the age of 18, 5 people (5%) aged 18 to 24, 15 people (16%) aged 25 to 44, 41 people (43%) aged 45 to 64, and 5 people (5%) who were 65 years of age or older. The median age was 38.8 years. There were 41 males and 55 females.

There were 26 housing units, which were all occupied, 18 (69%) by homeowners and 8 (31%) by renters.

== Education ==
El Rancho is served by the Lindsay Unified School District.
