= California Hot Springs, California =

- census-designated place
- Location of California Hot Springs in Tulare County, California.

- Location within California Location within the United States
- Coordinates: 35°52′49″N 118°40′25″W
- Country: United States
- State: California
- County: Tulare

Area
  - Total: 0.90 sq mi (2.33 km^{2})
  - Land: 0.90 sq mi (2.33 km^{2})
  - Water: 0 sq mi (0.00 km^{2}) 0%
- Elevation: 3,081 ft (939 m)

Population (2020)
  - Total: 50
  - Density: 55.5/sq mi (21.41/km^{2})
- Time zone: UTC-8 (Pacific (PST))
  - Summer (DST): UTC-7 (PDT)
- ZIP code: 93207
- Area code: 559
- GNIS feature IDs: 1660419; 2585404

California Hot Springs, formerly Deer Creek Hot Springs, is a census-designated place in Tulare County, California, United States. California Hot Springs is 20 miles (32 km) east of Ducor. California Hot Springs has a post office with ZIP code 93207. The population was 50 at the 2020 census, up from 37 at the 2010 census.

== History ==
The hot springs for which the town is named were renowned by native Yokuts Indians for their supposed curative properties. Resorts have existed in the area, formerly known as Deer Creek Hot Springs, since the 1880s. The large Hotel Del Venado was built near the hot springs in 1902. A commercial center, swimming pool and therapeutic center were added in the 1920s. The hotel burnt down in 1932, as did the commercial center in 1968. The facility remained abandoned until restorations were undertaken in the mid-1980s.

== Geography ==
According to the United States Census Bureau, the CDP covers an area of 0.7 square mile (1.9 km^{2}), all land.

According to a U.S. government geologist in 1915, California Hot Springs is "about 35 miles southeast of Porterville. Four springs here issue at points 5 to 20 yards apart along the southern bank of Deer Creek Canyon, 20 or 30 feet above the stream bed. This group yields about 35 gallons a minute of water 120° to 126° in temperature. Half a mile upstream on the northern side of the creek, another group of one main and two minor springs discharges about one-third as much water at a tempera- ture of 105°. All of the springs are noticeably sulphureted, but they are not highly mineralized. Within the last few years a company of investors had made extensive improvements here. In 1908 a frame hotel and annex provided accommodations for about 100 people, and small cottages and tents erected in an ample camp ground near by have sheltered several hundred people at one time."

== Demographics ==
Historical population
Census	Pop.	Note	%±
2010	37		—
2020	50		35.1%
U.S. Decennial Census; 1850–1870 1880-1890; 1900 1910 1920; 1930 1940 1950; 1960 1970 1980; 1990 2000 2010

=== 2020 census ===
As of the 2020 census, California Hot Springs had a population of 50. The median age was 66.5 years. 12.0% of residents were under the age of 18 and 58.0% of residents were 65 years of age or older. For every 100 females there were 92.3 males, and for every 100 females age 18 and over there were 69.2 males age 18 and over.

0.0% of residents lived in urban areas, while 100.0% lived in rural areas.

There were 28 households in California Hot Springs, of which 10.7% had children under the age of 18 living in them. Of all households, 64.3% were married-couple households, 21.4% were households with a male householder and no spouse or partner present, and 14.3% were households with a female householder and no spouse or partner present. About 25.0% of all households were made up of individuals and 14.2% had someone living alone who was 65 years of age or older.

There were 62 housing units, of which 54.8% were vacant. The homeowner vacancy rate was 11.1% and the rental vacancy rate was 0.0%.

Racial composition as of the 2020 census
Race	Number	Percent
White	47	94.0%
Black or African American	0	0.0%
American Indian and Alaska Native	0	0.0%
Asian	1	2.0%
Native Hawaiian and Other Pacific Islander	0	0.0%
Some other race	1	2.0%
Two or more races	1	2.0%
Hispanic or Latino (of any race)	2	4.0%

=== 2010 census ===
California Hot Springs first appeared as a census designated place in the 2010 U.S. census.

== Education ==
The CDP is served by the Hot Springs Elementary School District and by the Porterville Unified School District for grades 9–12.
