= Delft Colony, California =

Delft Colony
- census-designated place
- Location of Delft Colony in Tulare County, California.

- Position in California.
- Coordinates: 36°30′43″N 119°26′47″W
- Country: United States
- State: California
- County: Tulare
- Named for: Delft

Area
  - Total: 0.13 sq mi (0.34 km^{2})
  - Land: 0.13 sq mi (0.34 km^{2})
  - Water: 0 sq mi (0.00 km^{2}) 0%
- Elevation: 312 ft (95 m)

Population (2020)
  - Total: 412
  - Density: 3,098.1/sq mi (1,196.17/km^{2})
- Time zone: UTC-8 (Pacific (PST))
  - Summer (DST): UTC-7 (PDT)
- GNIS feature ID: 2585407

Delft Colony is a census-designated place (CDP) in Tulare County, California, United States. Delft Colony sits at an elevation of 312 feet (95 m). The 2020 United States census reported Delft Colony's population was 412.

== Geography ==
According to the United States Census Bureau, the CDP covers an area of 0.13 square mile (0.34 km^{2}), all land.

== Demographics ==
Historical population
Census	Pop.	Note	%±
2010	454		—
2020	412		−9.3%
U.S. Decennial Census; 1850–1870 1880-1890; 1900 1910 1920; 1930 1940 1950; 1960 1970 1980; 1990 2000 2010

Delft Colony first appeared as a census designated place in the 2010 U.S. census.

The 2020 United States census reported that Delft Colony had a population of 412. The population density was 3,097.7 inhabitants per square mile (1,196.0/km^{2}). The racial makeup of Delft Colony was 90 (21.8%) White, 0 (0.0%) African American, 6 (1.5%) Native American, 0 (0.0%) Asian, 0 (0.0%) Pacific Islander, 294 (71.4%) from other races, and 22 (5.3%) from two or more races. Hispanic or Latino of any race were 389 persons (94.4%).

The whole population lived in households. There were 110 households, out of which 41 (37.3%) had children under the age of 18 living in them, 56 (50.9%) were married-couple households, 4 (3.6%) were cohabiting couple households, 21 (19.1%) had a female householder with no partner present, and 29 (26.4%) had a male householder with no partner present. 19 households (17.3%) were one person, and 7 (6.4%) were one person aged 65 or older. The average household size was 3.75. There were 87 families (79.1% of all households).

The age distribution was 132 people (32.0%) under the age of 18, 69 people (16.7%) aged 18 to 24, 99 people (24.0%) aged 25 to 44, 85 people (20.6%) aged 45 to 64, and 27 people (6.6%) who were 65 years of age or older. The median age was 25.5 years. For every 100 females, there were 128.9 males.

There were 114 housing units at an average density of 857.1 units per square mile (330.9 units/km^{2}), of which 110 (96.5%) were occupied. Of these, 61 (55.5%) were owner-occupied, and 49 (44.5%) were occupied by renters.

== Education ==
The CDP is served by the Dinuba Unified School District for grades PreK-12.
