= Monson, California =

Monson
- census-designated place
- Location in Tulare County and the state of California

- Position in California.
- Coordinates: 36°29′34″N 119°20′09″W
- Country: United States
- State: California
- County: Tulare

Area
  - Total: 0.202 sq mi (0.524 km^{2})
  - Land: 0.202 sq mi (0.524 km^{2})
  - Water: 0 sq mi (0 km^{2}) 0%
- Elevation: 325 ft (99 m)

Population (2020)
  - Total: 152
  - Density: 751/sq mi (290/km^{2})
- Time zone: UTC-8 (Pacific (PST))
  - Summer (DST): UTC-7 (PDT)
- GNIS feature ID: 2585434

Monson is a census-designated place (CDP) in Tulare County, California, United States. Monson sits at an elevation of 325 feet (99 m). The 2020 United States census reported Monson's population was 152.

== Geography ==
According to the United States Census Bureau, the CDP covers an area of 0.2 square mile (0.5 km^{2}), all land.

At the 2010 census, the CDP had an area of 0.5 square mile (1.3 km^{2}), all land.

== Demographics ==
Historical population
Census	Pop.	Note	%±
2010	188		—
2020	152		−19.1%
U.S. Decennial Census; 2010

Monson first appeared as a census designated place in the 2010 U.S. census.

The 2020 United States census reported that Monson had a population of 152. The population density was 752.5 inhabitants per square mile (290.5/km^{2}). The racial makeup of Monson was 40 (26.3%) White, 0 (0.0%) African American, 0 (0.0%) Native American, 1 (0.7%) Asian, 0 (0.0%) Pacific Islander, 78 (51.3%) from other races, and 33 (21.7%) from two or more races. Hispanic or Latino of any race were 130 persons (85.5%).

The whole population lived in households. There were 33 households, out of which 13 (39.4%) had children under the age of 18 living in them, 14 (42.4%) were married-couple households, 5 (15.2%) were cohabiting couple households, 5 (15.2%) had a female householder with no partner present, and 9 (27.3%) had a male householder with no partner present. 8 households (24.2%) were one person, and 2 (6.1%) were one person aged 65 or older. The average household size was 4.61. There were 23 families (69.7% of all households).

The age distribution was 53 people (34.9%) under the age of 18, 12 people (7.9%) aged 18 to 24, 31 people (20.4%) aged 25 to 44, 38 people (25.0%) aged 45 to 64, and 18 people (11.8%) who were 65 years of age or older. The median age was 32.5 years. There were 59 males and 93 females.

There were 43 housing units at an average density of 212.9 units per square mile (82.2 units/km^{2}), of which 33 (76.7%) were occupied. Of these, 11 (33.3%) were owner-occupied, and 22 (66.7%) were occupied by renters.
