= Tooleville, California =

Tooleville
- Unincorporated community Census-designated place
- Location in Tulare County and the state of California

- Location in California.
- Coordinates: 36°17′16″N 119°06′56″W
- Country: United States
- State: California
- County: Tulare

Area
  - Total: 0.067 sq mi (0.173 km^{2})
  - Land: 0.067 sq mi (0.173 km^{2})
  - Water: 0 sq mi (0 km^{2}) 0%
- Elevation: 397 ft (121 m)

Population (2020)
  - Total: 286
  - Density: 4,280/sq mi (1,650/km^{2})
- Time zone: UTC-8 (Pacific (PST))
  - Summer (DST): UTC-7 (PDT)
- GNIS feature ID: 2585462

Tooleville is an unincorporated community in Tulare County, California, United States. Tooleville sits at an elevation of 397 feet (121 m). The 2020 United States census reported Tooleville's population was 286. For statistical purposes, the US Census Bureau has designated it a census-designated place (CDP).

Tooleville has the lowest per capita income ($3,711) of any CDP in California

== Geography ==
According to the United States Census Bureau, the CDP covers an area of 0.07 square mile (0.17 km^{2}), all land.

== History ==
Tooleville narratives indicate that the Toole family, coming from Missouri in the Dust Bowl era, purchased a large parcel of land and sold portions of it to other Dust Bowl migrants.

== Demographics ==
Historical population
Census	Pop.	Note	%±
2010	339		—
2020	286		−15.6%
U.S. Decennial Census; 1850–1870 1880-1890; 1900 1910 1920; 1930 1940 1950; 1960 1970 1980; 1990 2000 2010

Tooleville first appeared as a census designated place in the 2010 U.S. census.

The 2020 United States census reported that Tooleville had a population of 286. The population density was 4,268.7 inhabitants per square mile (1,648.2/km^{2}). The racial makeup of Tooleville was 39 (13.6%) White, 0 (0.0%) African American, 26 (9.1%) Native American, 6 (2.1%) Asian, 1 (0.3%) Pacific Islander, 167 (58.4%) from other races, and 47 (16.4%) from two or more races. Hispanic or Latino of any race were 253 persons (88.5%).

The whole population lived in households. There were 64 households, out of which 20 (31.3%) had children under the age of 18 living in them, 42 (65.6%) were married-couple households, 2 (3.1%) were cohabiting couple households, 16 (25.0%) had a female householder with no partner present, and 4 (6.3%) had a male householder with no partner present. 10 households (15.6%) were one person, and 7 (10.9%) were one person aged 65 or older. The average household size was 4.47. There were 54 families (84.4% of all households).

The age distribution was 104 people (36.4%) under the age of 18, 25 people (8.7%) aged 18 to 24, 57 people (19.9%) aged 25 to 44, 84 people (29.4%) aged 45 to 64, and 16 people (5.6%) who were 65 years of age or older. The median age was 27.5 years. For every 100 females, there were 70.2 males.

There were 80 housing units at an average density of 1,194.0 units per square mile (461.0 units/km^{2}), of which 64 (80.0%) were occupied. Of these, 51 (79.7%) were owner-occupied, and 13 (20.3%) were occupied by renters.

== Infrastructure ==
Lacking a municipal water supply network, residents have used water that comes from two wells that are contaminated with nitrate and Coliform bacteria. Tooleville is one of many areas in the Central Valley plagued for decades by contaminated drinking water caused by chemical fertilizers, animal wastes, and pesticides that have infiltrated aquifers. In 1973, the county general plan deemed as having little or no authentic future and that by withholding major public facilities such as sewer and water systems, the community would enter a process of long term, natural decline.

Tooleville residents have sought water access through nearby Exeter, but Exeter officials declined to provide a connection to their water system for more than 20 years. In August 2021, the California State Water Resources Control Board sent a letter stating that the state would intervene if the city did create a consolidation plan within six months. Planning of a connection project started shortly thereafter, and the project is expected to take eight years to complete.

== Education ==
Tooleville is served by the Exeter Unified School District for grades PK-12.
