= Cutler-Orosi Joint Unified School District =

School district in California

Address
- 12623 Avenue 416 Orosi, California, 93647; United States

District information
- Type: Public
- Grades: K–12
- NCES District ID: 0610350

Students and staff
- Students: 4,007 (2020–2021)
- Teachers: 180.54 (FTE)
- Staff: 277.15 (FTE)
- Student–teacher ratio: 22.19:1

Other information
- Website: www.cojusd.org

The Cutler-Orosi Joint Unified School District is a school district in California.

The towns of Cutler (pop. 6,999; elev. 358') and Orosi (pop. 11,181; elev. 373), separated by about 1 mile, are located in Tulare County, California. The Cutler-Orosi Unified School District has an average daily attendance of 3,784; Mount Whitney (elev. 14,505 ft, 4,421 m), the highest point in the Continental United States, falls within the school district's borders.

Within Tulare County, the district includes Cutler, Orosi, East Orosi, Hartland, and Yettem. A portion of the district extends into Fresno County, where it includes Yokuts Valley.

== Schools ==
The Cutler-Orosi Unified School District has a variety of schools:

=== State schools ===
- Cutler Elementary School
- Cutler-Orosi Community Day School
- Cutler-Orosi Adult School
- Golden Valley Elementary School
- Palm Elementary School
- El Monte Jr. High
- Orosi High School

=== Alternative schools ===
- Lovell High School
- Yettem Continuation High School
- Esperanza Independent Study
- Community Day School
