= Waukena, California =

Waukena
- census-designated place
- Location in Tulare County and the state of California

- Location within California Location within the United States
- Coordinates: 36°08′19″N 119°30′34″W
- Country: United States
- State: California
- County: Tulare

Area
  - Total: 0.35 sq mi (0.91 km^{2})
  - Land: 0.35 sq mi (0.91 km^{2})
  - Water: 0 sq mi (0 km^{2}) 0%
- Elevation: 226 ft (69 m)

Population (2020)
  - Total: 80
  - Density: 230/sq mi (88/km^{2})
- Time zone: UTC-8 (Pacific (PST))
  - Summer (DST): UTC-7 (PDT)
- ZIP code: 93282
- Area code: 559
- GNIS feature IDa: 251266; 2585463

Waukena is a census-designated place in Tulare County, California, United States. Waukena is located on California State Route 137 4 miles (6.4 km) northeast of Corcoran. Waukena has a post office with ZIP code 93282. The population was 80 at the 2020 census. Its name is possible derived from an archaic English interpretation of the Spanish name Joaquina.

== Geography ==
According to the United States Census Bureau, the CDP covers an area of 0.35 square mile (0.91 km^{2}), all land.

=== Climate ===
According to the Köppen Climate Classification system, Waukena has a semi-arid climate, abbreviated "BSk" on climate maps.

== Demographics ==
Historical population
Census	Pop.	Note	%±
2010	108		—
2020	80		−25.9%
U.S. Decennial Census; 1850–1870 1880-1890; 1900 1910 1920; 1930 1940 1950; 1960 1970 1980; 1990 2000 2010

Waukena first appeared as a census designated place in the 2010 U.S. census.

The 2020 United States census reported that Waukena had a population of 80. The population density was 228.6 inhabitants per square mile (88.3/km^{2}). The racial makeup was 34 (42.5%) White, 1 (1.3%) African American, 4 (5.0%) Native American, 0 (0.0%) Asian, 0 (0.0%) Pacific Islander, 21 (26.3%) from other races, and 20 (25.0%) from two or more races. Hispanic or Latino of any race were 48 persons (60.0%).

There were 33 households, out of which 16 (48.5%) had children under the age of 18 living in them, 19 (57.6%) were married-couple households, 3 (9.1%) were cohabiting couple households, 5 (15.2%) had a female householder with no partner present, and 6 (18.2%) had a male householder with no partner present. 3 households (9.1%) were one person, and 1 (3.0%) were one person aged 65 or older. The average household size was 2.42. There were 30 families (90.9% of all households).

The age distribution was 11 people (13.8%) under the age of 18, 10 people (12.5%) aged 18 to 24, 23 people (28.7%) aged 25 to 44, 25 people (31.2%) aged 45 to 64, and 11 people (13.8%) who were 65 years of age or older. The median age was 42.0 years. There were 41 males and 39 females.

There were 37 housing units at an average density of 105.7 units per square mile (40.8 units/km^{2}), of which 33 (89.2%) were occupied. Of these, 7 (21.2%) were owner-occupied, and 26 (78.8%) were occupied by renters.

== Education ==
Waukena is served by the Waukena Joint Union Elementary School District and Tulare Joint Union High School Districts.
