= Sugarloaf Saw Mill, California =

Sugarloaf Saw Mill
- census-designated place
- Location in Tulare County and the state of California

- Position in California.
- Coordinates: 35°50′03″N 118°37′00″W
- Country: United States
- State: California
- County: Tulare

Area
  - Total: 0.097 sq mi (0.252 km^{2})
  - Land: 0.097 sq mi (0.252 km^{2})
  - Water: 0 sq mi (0 km^{2}) 0%
- Elevation: 5,440 ft (1,660 m)

Population (2020)
  - Total: 14
  - Density: 140/sq mi (56/km^{2})
- Time zone: UTC-8 (Pacific (PST))
  - Summer (DST): UTC-7 (PDT)
- GNIS feature ID: 2585451

Sugarloaf Saw Mill is a census-designated place (CDP) in Tulare County, California, United States. Sugarloaf Saw Mill sits at an elevation of 5,440 feet (1,660 m). The 2020 United States census reported Sugarloaf Saw Mill's population was 14, down from 18 at the 2010 census.

== Geography ==
According to the United States Census Bureau, the CDP covers an area of 0.1 square mile (0.3 km^{2}), all land.

== Demographics ==
Historical population
Census	Pop.	Note	%±
2010	18		—
2020	14		−22.2%
U.S. Decennial Census; 1850–1870 1880-1890; 1900 1910 1920; 1930 1940 1950; 1960 1970 1980; 1990 2000 2010

Sugarloaf Mountain Park first appeared as a census designated place in the 2000 U.S. census.

The 2020 United States census reported that Sugarloaf Saw Mill had a population of 14, of which 12 were Non-Hispanic White and 2 were Hispanic or Latino. The median age was 57.5 years.

There were 57 housing units at an average density of 587.6 units per square mile (226.9 units/km^{2}), of which 9 were occupied, all by homeowners, and 48 were used seasonally.

== Education ==
The CDP is served by the Linns Valley-Poso Flat Union School District and the Porterville Unified School District for grades 9–12.
