= Matheny, California =

Matheny
- census-designated place
- Location in Tulare County and the state of California

- Position in California.
- Coordinates: 36°10′14″N 119°21′06″W
- Country: United States
- State: California
- County: Tulare

Area
  - Total: 0.428 sq mi (1.109 km^{2})
  - Land: 0.428 sq mi (1.109 km^{2})
  - Water: 0 sq mi (0 km^{2}) 0%
- Elevation: 269 ft (82 m)

Population (2020)
  - Total: 1,125
  - Density: 2,627/sq mi (1,014/km^{2})
- Time zone: UTC-8 (Pacific (PST))
  - Summer (DST): UTC-7 (PDT)
- GNIS feature ID: 2585433

Matheny is a census-designated place (CDP) in Tulare County, California, United States. Matheny sits at an elevation of 269 feet (82 m). The 2020 United States census reported Matheny's population as 1,125.

Matheny's water system, Pratt Mutual, has elevated arsenic levels. Matheny residents are attempting to merge Pratt Mutual into Tulare's water utility. On April 1, 2016, the State Water Resource Control Board issued a mandatory water system consolidation order directing the City of Tulare to connect Matheny Tract to the Tulare County water system.

== Geography ==
According to the United States Census Bureau, the CDP covers an area of 0.4 square mile (1.1 km^{2}), all land.

== Demographics ==
Historical population
Census	Pop.	Note	%±
2010	1,212		—
2020	1,125		−7.2%
U.S. Decennial Census; 2010

=== 2020 census ===
As of the 2020 census, Matheny had a population of 1,125 and a population density of 2,628.5 inhabitants per square mile (1,014.9/km^{2}). The median age was 31.1 years. For every 100 females, there were 121.5 males, and for every 100 females age 18 and over, there were 136.8 males age 18 and over.

78.0% of residents lived in urban areas, while 22.0% lived in rural areas.

The whole population lived in households. There were 318 households, out of which 132 (41.5%) had children under the age of 18 living in them, 146 (45.9%) were married-couple households, 28 (8.8%) were cohabiting couple households, 57 (17.9%) had a female householder with no spouse or partner present, and 87 (27.4%) had a male householder with no spouse or partner present. 55 households (17.3%) were one person, and 25 (7.9%) were one person aged 65 or older. The average household size was 3.54. There were 243 families (76.4% of all households).

The age distribution was 353 people (31.4%) under the age of 18, 122 people (10.8%) aged 18 to 24, 292 people (26.0%) aged 25 to 44, 234 people (20.8%) aged 45 to 64, and 124 people (11.0%) who were 65 years of age or older.

There were 338 housing units at an average density of 789.7 units per square mile (304.9 units/km^{2}), of which 318 (94.1%) were occupied. Of occupied units, 156 (49.1%) were owner-occupied and 162 (50.9%) were occupied by renters. Of all housing units, 5.9% were vacant. The homeowner vacancy rate was 0.0% and the rental vacancy rate was 1.8%.

Racial composition as of the 2020 census
Race	Number	Percent
White	313	27.8%
Black or African American	8	0.7%
American Indian and Alaska Native	12	1.1%
Asian	6	0.5%
Native Hawaiian and Other Pacific Islander	1	0.1%
Some other race	489	43.5%
Two or more races	296	26.3%
Hispanic or Latino (of any race)	916	81.4%

=== 2010 census ===
Matheny first appeared as a census designated place in the 2010 U.S. census.

== Education ==
Matheny is served by the Palo Verde Union Elementary School District and by the Tulare Joint Union High School District.
