= Cedar Slope, California =

- census-designated place
- Location of Cedar Slope in Tulare County, California.

- Position in California.
- Coordinates: 36°08′37″N 118°34′38″W
- Country: United States
- State: California
- County: Tulare

Area
  - Total: 0.29 sq mi (0.75 km^{2})
  - Land: 0.29 sq mi (0.75 km^{2})
  - Water: 0 sq mi (0.00 km^{2}) 0%
- Elevation: 5,584 ft (1,702 m)

Population (2020)
  - Total: 10
  - Density: 35/sq mi (13.4/km^{2})
- Time zone: UTC-8 (Pacific (PST))
  - Summer (DST): UTC-7 (PDT)
- GNIS feature ID: 2585406

Cedar Slope is a census-designated place (CDP) in Tulare County, California, United States. Cedar Slope sits at an elevation of 5,584 feet (1,702 m). The 2020 United States census reported that Cedar Slope as 10, an increase over the total of zero in 2010. Cedar Slope can be reached from Porterville by 37 curvy miles on California State Route 190 with an elevation gain of 5,525 feet.

== Geography ==
According to the United States Census Bureau, the CDP covers an area of 0.3 square mile (0.7 km^{2}), all land.

== Demographics ==
Historical population
Census	Pop.	Note	%±
2010	0		—
2020	10		—
U.S. Decennial Census; 1850–1870 1880-1890; 1900 1910 1920; 1930 1940 1950; 1960 1970 1980; 1990 2000 2010

Cedar Slope first appeared as a census designated place in the 2010 U.S. census.

=== Racial and ethnic composition ===
Cedar Slope CDP, California – Racial and ethnic composition Note: the US Census treats Hispanic/Latino as an ethnic category. This table excludes Latinos from the racial categories and assigns them to a separate category. Hispanics/Latinos may be of any race.
Race / Ethnicity (NH = Non-Hispanic)	Pop 2010	Pop 2020	% 2010	% 2020
White alone (NH)	0	6	0.00%	60.00%
Black or African American alone (NH)	0	1	0.00%	10.00%
Native American or Alaska Native alone (NH)	0	0	0.00%	0.00%
Asian alone (NH)	0	0	0.00%	0.00%
Native Hawaiian or Pacific Islander alone (NH)	0	0	0.00%	0.00%
Other race alone (NH)	0	0	0.00%	0.00%
Mixed race or Multiracial (NH)	0	1	0.00%	10.00%
Hispanic or Latino (any race)	0	2	0.00%	20.00%
Total	0	10	100.00%	100.00%

=== 2020 census ===
As of the 2020 census, Cedar Slope had a population of 10. The median age was 39.0 years. 20.0% of residents were under the age of 18 and 10.0% of residents were 65 years of age or older. For every 100 females there were 400.0 males, and for every 100 females age 18 and over there were 700.0 males age 18 and over.

0.0% of residents lived in urban areas, while 100.0% lived in rural areas.

There were 0 households in Cedar Slope. No households had children under the age of 18. There were no households headed by a single male or single female householder. There were no one-person households, including anyone living alone who was 65 years of age or older.

There were 37 housing units, of which 100.0% were vacant. The homeowner vacancy rate was 0.0% and the rental vacancy rate was 0.0%.

== History ==
The first occupant of Cedar Slope was the artist and seamstress Nellie Marshall in 1881. Nearby Marshall Creek is named after her. In 1945, 80 acres of the original homestead were purchased and developed by Les and Ruth Bailey and Fred and Hazelyn Hopkins. Tulare County approved this 80-acre expanse as Tract 119 in 1947, authorizing the construction of the area's first cabins. Many of the first wave of cabins were built by World War Two veterans. The community owned Cedar Slope Mutual Water Company, established in 1947, provides and manages water to the development. Carl and Lynn Tapia rebuilt the Cedar Slope Inn after the original store on that site on Highway 190 burned down in the late 1960s. The couple ran it as a community bar and music venue until Carl suffered his first stroke in 1997. Afterwards the property passed into other hands. The Cedar Slope Inn suffered no meaningful damage during the Sequoia Complex Fire (SQF Complex).

== Sequoia Complex Fire ==
In September, 2020, Cedar Slope was largely destroyed by the naturally sparked Sequoia Complex Fire. Fifty-seven of the 65 cabins were completely burned. In the nearby communities of Alpine Village and Sequoia Crest, 37 and 49 cabins were lost in the fire, respectively. The McIntrye Grove of Giant Sequoia, a short distance to the south from Cedar Slope, is reported as heavily damaged by SQF Fire. The area remains at risk for mud flows and flash floods due to the charred soil being unable to absorb water.

== Education ==
Cedar Slope is served by the Springville Union Elementary School District as well as by the Porterville Unified School District for secondary school.
