= Kaweah, California =

Unincorporated community in California, United States

- Unincorporated community
- Location within California Location within the United States
- Coordinates: 36°28′11″N 118°55′06″W
- Country: United States
- State: California
- County: Tulare
- Elevation: 942 ft (287 m)
- Time zone: UTC-8 (Pacific (PST))
  - Summer (DST): UTC-7 (PDT)
- ZIP code: 93237
- Area code: 559
- GNIS feature ID: 1660826

Kaweah (Yokuts: Gā'wia) is an unincorporated community in Tulare County, California, United States. Kaweah is 2 miles (3.2 km) north-northwest of Three Rivers. Kaweah has a post office with ZIP code 93237.

== Climate ==
The region experiences warm, hot, and dry summers, with no average monthly temperatures above 72 °F. According to the Köppen Climate Classification system, Kaweah has a warm-summer Mediterranean climate, abbreviated "Csb" on climate maps.
