= Ponderosa, California =

Ponderosa
- census-designated place
- Location in Tulare County and the state of California

- Position in California.
- Coordinates: 36°06′18″N 118°31′46″W
- Country: United States
- State: California
- County: Tulare

Area
  - Total: 0.815 sq mi (2.111 km^{2})
  - Land: 0.811 sq mi (2.100 km^{2})
  - Water: 0.0039 sq mi (0.010 km^{2}) 0.49%
- Elevation: 7,231 ft (2,204 m)

Population (2020)
  - Total: 51
  - Density: 63/sq mi (24/km^{2})
- Time zone: UTC-8 (Pacific (PST))
  - Summer (DST): UTC-7 (PDT)
- GNIS feature ID: 2585440

Ponderosa is a census-designated place (CDP) in Tulare County, California, United States. Ponderosa sits at an elevation of 7,231 feet (2,204 m). The 2020 United States census reported Ponderosa's population as 51. Ponderosa can be reached from Porterville by 43 curvy miles on a combination of California State Route 190 and the county-maintained Western Divide Highway with an elevation gain of 6,772 feet.

== Geography ==
According to the United States Census Bureau, the CDP covers an area of 0.8 square mile (2.1 km^{2}), of which 99.51% is land and 0.49% is water.

== Demographics ==
Historical population
Census	Pop.	Note	%±
2010	16		—
2020	51		218.8%
U.S. Decennial Census; 1850–1870 1880-1890; 1900 1910 1920; 1930 1940 1950; 1960 1970 1980; 1990 2000 2010

Ponderosa first appeared as a census designated place in the 2010 U.S. census.

The 2020 United States census reported that Ponderosa had a population of 51. The population density was 62.9 inhabitants per square mile (24.3/km^{2}). The racial makeup of Ponderosa was 42 (82%) White, 0 (0%) African American, 4 (7.8%) Native American, 0 (0%) Asian, 0 (0%) Pacific Islander, 1 (2%) from other races, and 4 (8%) from two or more races. Hispanic or Latino of any race were 6 persons (12%).

There were 25 households, and the average household size was 2.04.

The age distribution was 7 people (13.7%) under the age of 18, 0 people (0%) aged 18 to 24, 6 people (12%) aged 25 to 44, 17 people (33%) aged 45 to 64, and 21 people (41%) who were 65 years of age or older. The median age was 62.5 years. There were 34 males and 17 females.

There were 142 housing units at an average density of 175.1 units per square mile (67.6 units/km^{2}), of which 25 (18%) were occupied year round and 104 (73%) were used seasonally. Of the occupied housing units, 24 (96%) were owner-occupied, and 1 (4%) were occupied by renters.

== History ==
Ponderosa started as sheep pasture covering more than 280 acres originally owned by Alex Kramer. Over the years, his heirs sold parts of the property. One-third of the land was eventually sold to Don Carter, a real estate developer. In 1963, he subdivided his portion of the land and officially opened Ponderosa. In September, 2020, Ponderosa was spared the destruction of other small communities in the area by the naturally sparked Sequoia Complex Fire (SQF Complex)

== Education ==
Ponderosa is served by the Springville Union Elementary School District as well as by the Porterville Unified School District for secondary school.
