= McClenney Tract, California =

McClenney Tract
- Census-designated place
- Location in Tulare County and the state of California

- Position in California.
- Coordinates: 35°49′19″N 118°38′52″W
- Country: United States
- State: California
- County: Tulare

Area
  - Total: 0.616 sq mi (1.595 km^{2})
  - Land: 0.616 sq mi (1.595 km^{2})
  - Water: 0 sq mi (0 km^{2}) 0%
- Elevation: 4,875 ft (1,486 m)

Population (2020)
  - Total: 15
  - Density: 24/sq mi (9.4/km^{2})
- Time zone: UTC-8 (Pacific (PST))
  - Summer (DST): UTC-7 (PDT)
- GNIS feature ID: 2585431

McClenney Tract is a census-designated place (CDP) in Tulare County, California, United States. McClenney Tract sits at an elevation of 4,875 feet (1,486 m). The 2020 United States census reported McClenney Tract's population was 15, up from 10 at the 2010 census.

== Geography ==
According to the United States Census Bureau, the CDP covers an area of 0.6 square mile (1.6 km^{2}), all land.

== Demographics ==
Historical population
| Census | Pop. | Note | %± |
|---|---|---|---|
| 2010 | 10 | | — |
| 2020 | 15 | | 50.0% |
U.S. Decennial Census; 1850–1870 1880-1890; 1900 1910 1920; 1930 1940 1950; 1960 1970 1980; 1990 2000 2010

McClenney Tract first appeared as a census designated place in the 2010 U.S. census.

The 2020 United States census reported that McClenney Tract had a population of 15. The population density was 24.4 inhabitants per square mile (9.4/km^{2}).

The racial breakdown was twelve White, one Native American, one from other races, and one from two or more races. Two people were Hispanic or Latino.

There were 39 housing units at an average density of 63.3 units per square mile (24.4 units/km^{2}), of which 11 were occupied year round and 24 were used seasonally.

== Education ==
The CDP is served by the Linns Valley-Poso Flat Union School District and by the Porterville Unified School District for grades 9–12.
