= Posey, California =

Posey
- census-designated place
- Location in Tulare County and the state of California

- Location within California Location within the United States
- Coordinates: 35°48′17″N 118°40′58″W
- Country: United States
- State: California
- County: Tulare

Area
  - Total: 0.357 sq mi (0.924 km^{2})
  - Land: 0.357 sq mi (0.924 km^{2})
  - Water: 0 sq mi (0 km^{2}) 0%
- Elevation: 3,560 ft (1,090 m)

Population (2020)
  - Total: 23
  - Density: 64/sq mi (25/km^{2})
- Time zone: UTC-8 (Pacific (PST))
  - Summer (DST): UTC-7 (PDT)
- ZIP code: 93260
- Area code: 661
- GNIS feature IDs: 1661254; 2585441

Posey is a census-designated place in Tulare County, California, United States. Posey is 21 miles (34 km) east-southeast of Ducor. Posey has a post office with ZIP code 93260, which opened in 1915. The population was 23 at the 2020 United States census, up from 10 at the 2010 census. The elevation of Posey is 3573 feet.

== Geography ==
According to the United States Census Bureau, the CDP covers an area of 0.4 square mile (0.9 km^{2}), all land. In the past, the area near Posey had numerous tungsten mines.

=== Climate ===
According to the Köppen Climate Classification system, Posey has a semi-arid climate, abbreviated "BSk" on climate maps.

== Demographics ==
Historical population
Census	Pop.	Note	%±
2010	10		—
2020	23		130.0%
U.S. Decennial Census; 1860–1870 1880-1890; 1900 1910 1920; 1930 1940 1950; 1960 1970 1980; 1990 2000 2010

Posey first appeared as a census designated place in the 2010 U.S. census.

The 2020 United States census reported that Posey had a population of 23. The population density was 64.4 inhabitants per square mile (24.9/km^{2}). The racial makeup of Posey was 17 (74%) White, 0 (0%) African American, 2 (9%) Native American, 0 (0%) Asian, 0 (0%) Pacific Islander, 2 (9%) from other races, and 2 (9%) from two or more races. Hispanic or Latino of any race were 2 persons (9%).

There were 8 households, and the average household size was 2.88. The median age was 66.5 years.

There were 43 housing units at an average density of 120.4 units per square mile (46.5 units/km^{2}), of which 8 (19%) were occupied and 31 (72%) were used seasonally.

== Education ==
Most of the CDP is served by the Linns Valley-Poso Flat Union School District, while a section is within the Ducor Union Elementary School District. All of the CDP is served by the Porterville Unified School District for grades 9–12.
