= Sugarloaf Village, California =

Sugarloaf Village
- census-designated place
- Location in Tulare County and the state of California

- Position in California.
- Coordinates: 35°49′37″N 118°38′08″W
- Country: United States
- State: California
- County: Tulare

Area
  - Total: 0.067 sq mi (0.174 km^{2})
  - Land: 0.067 sq mi (0.174 km^{2})
  - Water: 0 sq mi (0 km^{2}) 0%
- Elevation: 5,171 ft (1,576 m)

Population (2020)
  - Total: 7
  - Density: 100/sq mi (40/km^{2})
- Time zone: UTC-8 (Pacific (PST))
  - Summer (DST): UTC-7 (PDT)
- GNIS feature ID: 2585452

Sugarloaf Village is a census-designated place (CDP) in Tulare County, California, United States. Sugarloaf Village sits at an elevation of 5,171 feet (1,576 m). The 2020 United States census reported Sugarloaf Village's population was 7, down from 10 at the 2010 census.

== Geography ==
According to the United States Census Bureau, the CDP covers an area of 0.1 square mile (0.2 km^{2}), all land.

== Demographics ==
Historical population
Census	Pop.	Note	%±
2010	10		—
2020	7		−30.0%
U.S. Decennial Census; 1850–1870 1880-1890; 1900 1910 1920; 1930 1940 1950; 1960 1970 1980; 1990 2000 2010

Sugarloaf Village first appeared as a census designated place in the 2010 U.S. census.

The 2020 United States census reported that Sugarloaf Village had a population of 7, of which 6 were Non-Hispanic White and 1 was Hispanic or Latino. The median age was 76.8 years.

There were 25 housing units at an average density of 373.1 units per square mile (144.1 units/km^{2}), of which 8 were occupied. Of these, 5 were owner-occupied, and 3 were occupied by renters.

== Education ==
The CDP is served by the Linns Valley-Poso Flat Union School District and the Porterville Unified School District for grades 9–12.
