= Pierpoint, California =

Pierpoint
- census-designated place
- Location in Tulare County and the state of California

- Position in California.
- Coordinates: 36°08′26″N 118°37′47″W
- Country: United States
- State: California
- County: Tulare

Area
  - Total: 0.408 sq mi (1.057 km^{2})
  - Land: 0.408 sq mi (1.057 km^{2})
  - Water: 0 sq mi (0 km^{2}) 0%
- Elevation: 4,610 ft (1,410 m)

Population (2020)
  - Total: 59
  - Density: 140/sq mi (56/km^{2})
- Time zone: UTC-8 (Pacific (PST))
  - Summer (DST): UTC-7 (PDT)
- GNIS feature ID: 2585437

Pierpoint is a census-designated place (CDP) in Tulare County, California, United States. Pierpoint sits at an elevation of 4,610 feet (1,410 m). The 2020 United States census reported Pierpoint's population was 59.

== Geography ==
According to the United States Census Bureau, the CDP covers an area of 0.4 square mile (1.1 km^{2}), all land.

== Demographics ==
Historical population
Census	Pop.	Note	%±
2010	52		—
2020	59		13.5%
U.S. Decennial Census; 1850–1870 1880-1890; 1900 1910 1920; 1930 1940 1950; 1960 1970 1980; 1990 2000 2010

Pierpoint first appeared as a census designated place in the 2010 U.S. census.

The 2020 United States census reported that Pierpoint had a population of 59. The population density was 144.6 inhabitants per square mile (55.8/km^{2}). The racial makeup of Pierpoint was 53 (90%) White and 6 (10%) from two or more races. Hispanic or Latino of any race were 6 persons (10%).

There were 38 households, and the average household size was 1.55.

The age distribution was 12 people (20%) under the age of 18, 1 person (2%) aged 18 to 24, 1 person (2%) aged 25 to 44, 6 people (10%) aged 45 to 64, and 39 people (66%) who were 65 years of age or older. The median age was 68.9 years. There were 34 males and 25 females.

There were 79 housing units at an average density of 193.6 units per square mile (74.7 units/km^{2}), of which 38 (48%) were occupied year round and 41 (52%) were used seasonally. Of the occupied housing units, 26 (68%) were owner-occupied, and 12 (32%) were occupied by renters.

== Education ==
Pierpoint is served by the Springville Union Elementary School District as well as by the Porterville Unified School District for secondary school.
