= Tulare County, California =

County in California, United States

Tulare County
- County
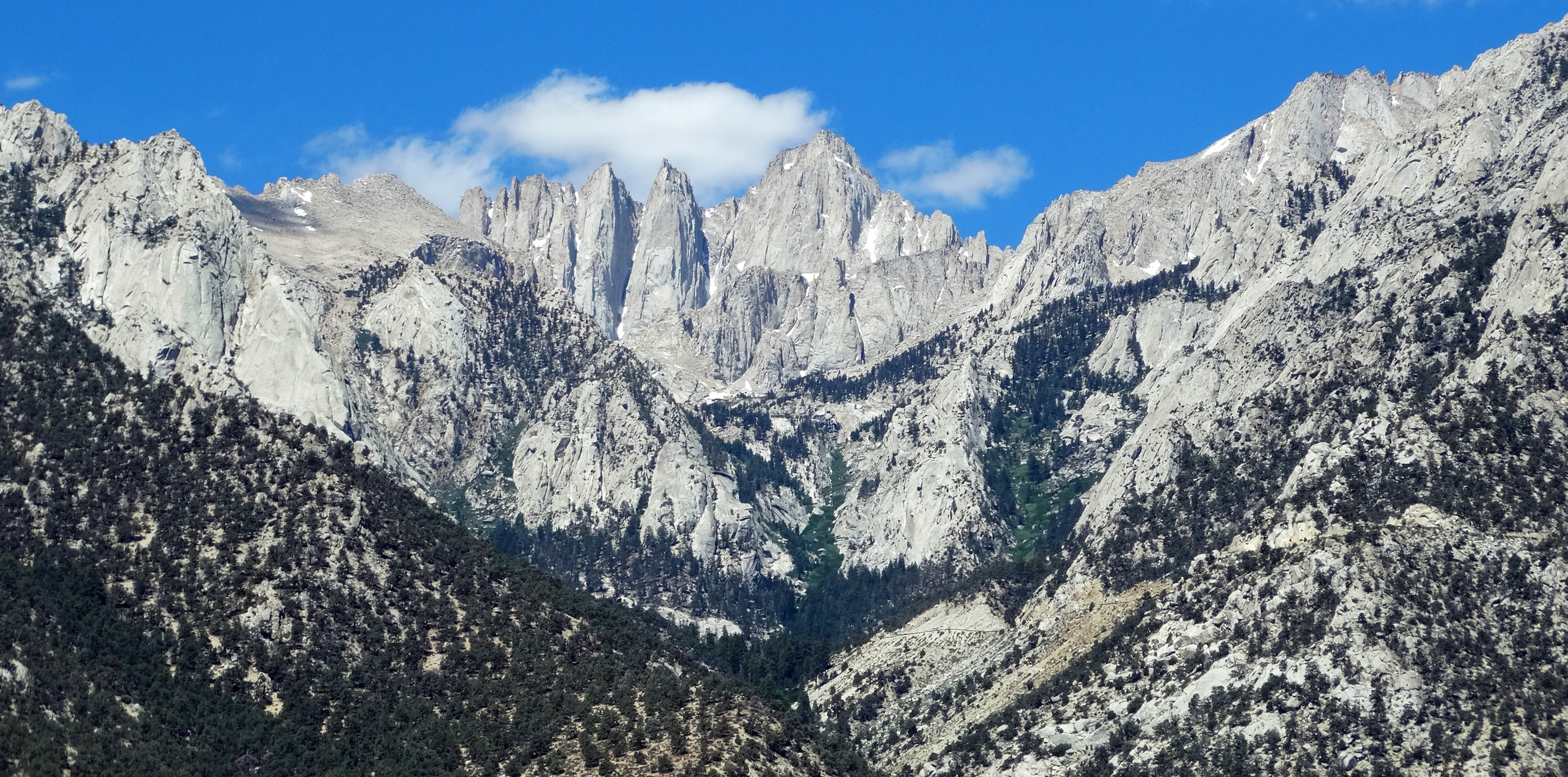
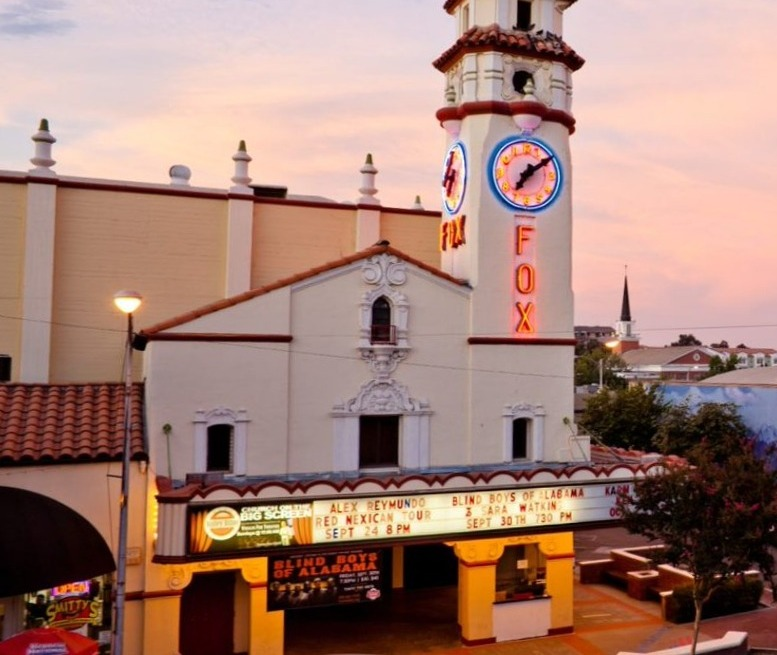
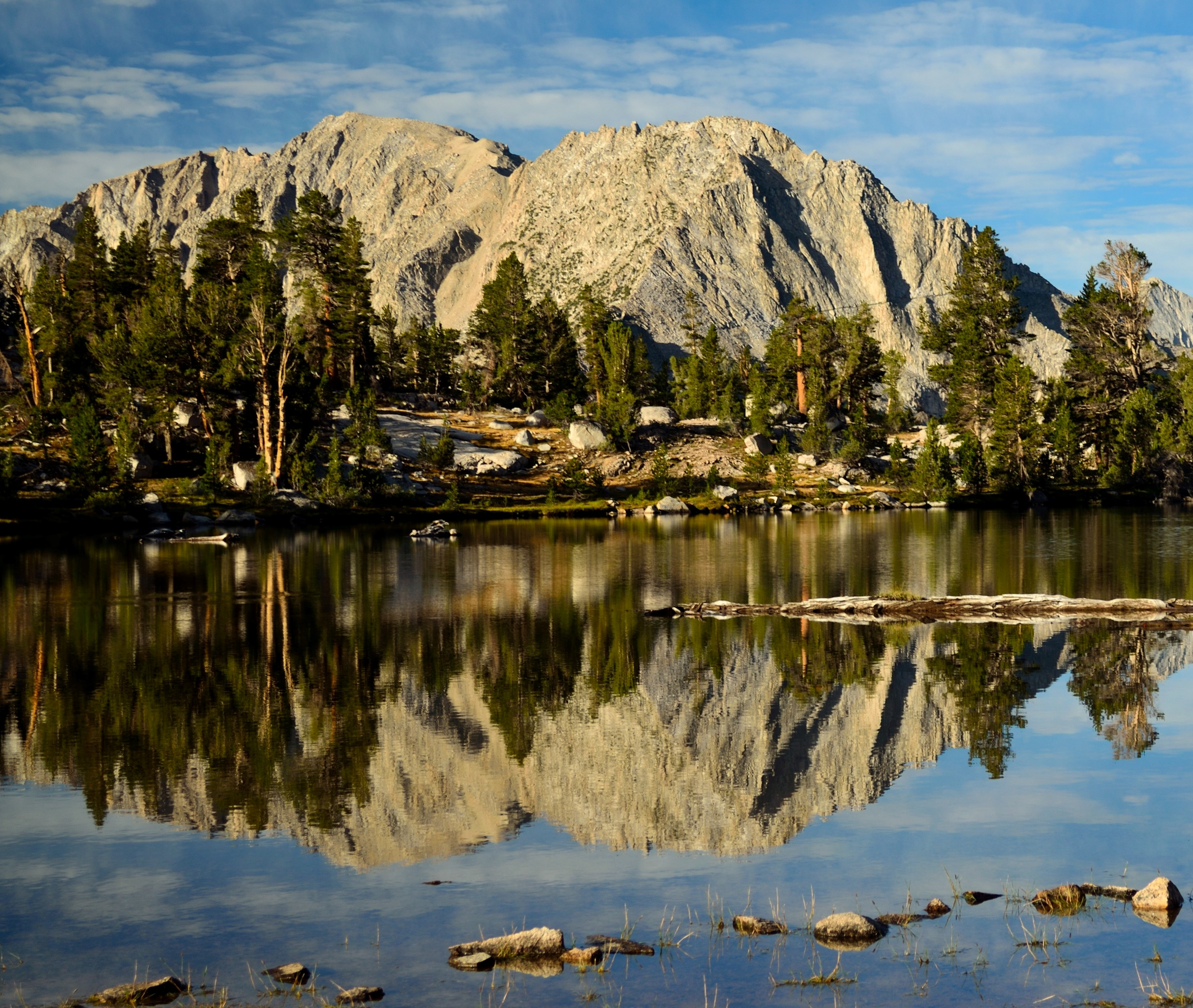
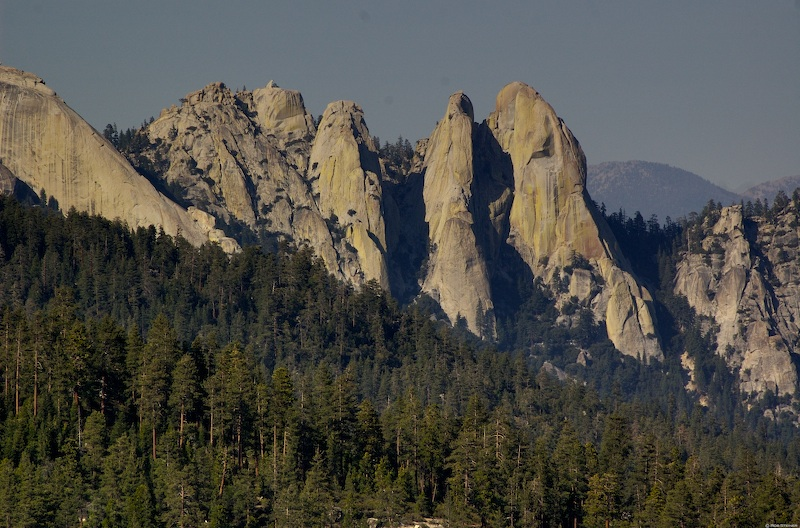
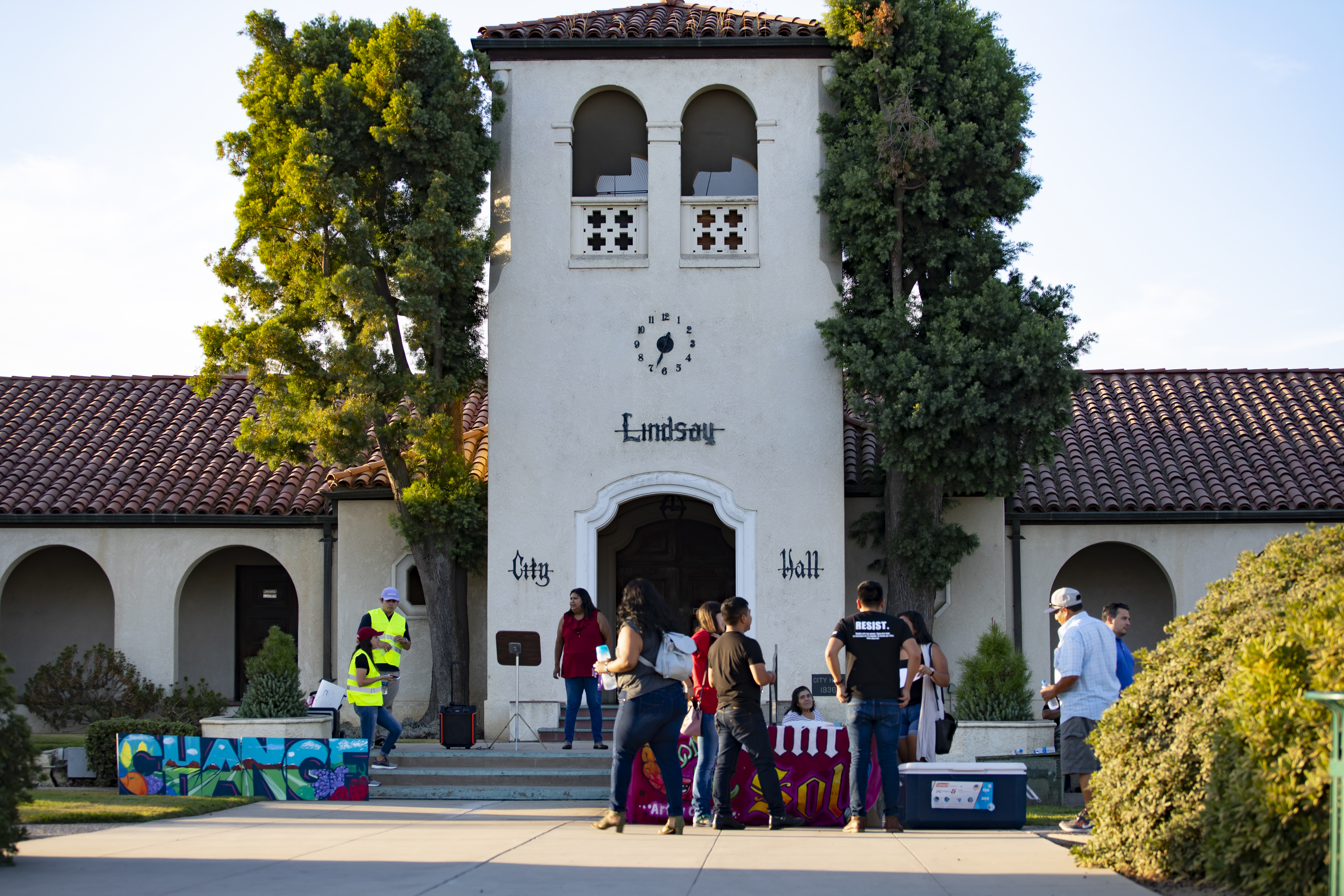
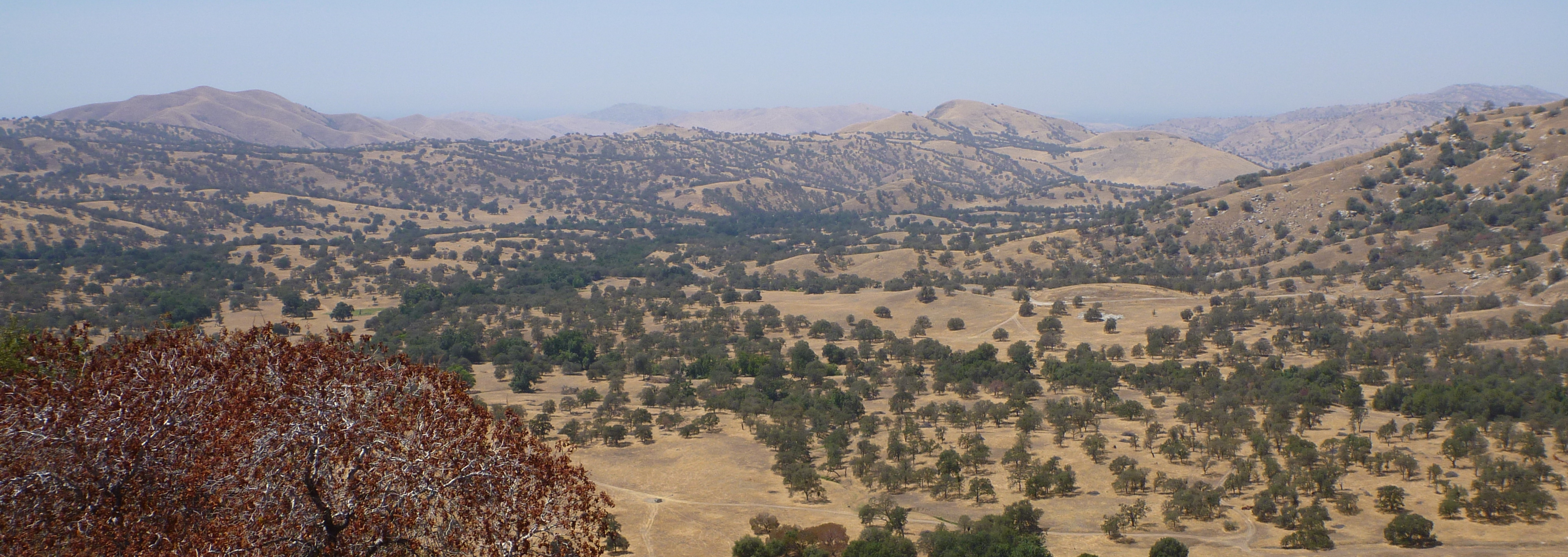
- Mount Whitney in the Sierra Nevada Visalia West Vidette Sequoia Needles Lindsay Sierra Foothills near Kaweah

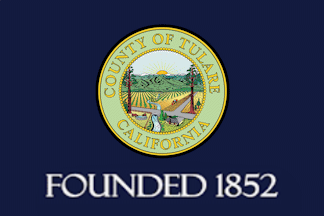
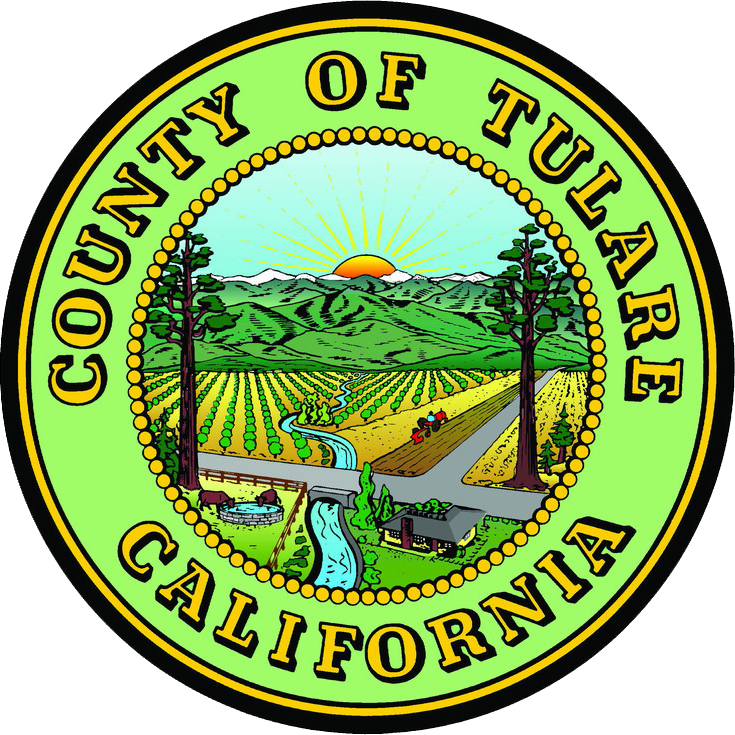
- Flag Seal
- Interactive map of Tulare County
- Location in the state of California
- Coordinates: 36.23°N 118.80°W
- Country: United States
- State: California
- Regions: San Joaquin Valley and Sierra Nevada
- Metro area: Visalia-Porterville Metropolitan Area
- Incorporated: July 10, 1852
- Named for: Tulare Lake, which is named for the tule rush that lined its shores
- County seat: Visalia
- Largest city: Visalia
- Incorporated cities: 8

Government
  - Type: Council–CAO
  - Body: Board of Supervisors
  - Chair: Amy Shuklian
  - Vice Chair: Dennis Townsend
  - Board of Supervisors: Supervisors: Larry Micari; Peter Vander Poel; Amy Shuklian; Eddie Valero; Dennis Townsend
  - Administrative Officer: Jason Britt

Area
  - Total: 4,839 sq mi (12,530 km^{2})
  - Land: 4,823 sq mi (12,490 km^{2})
  - Water: 14 sq mi (36 km^{2})
- Highest elevation: 14,501 ft (4,420 m)

Population (2020)
  - Total: 473,117
  - Estimate (2025): 485,146 ▲
  - Density: 98.10/sq mi (37.88/km^{2})

GDP
  - Total: $22.794 billion (2022)
- Time zone: UTC−8 (Pacific)
  - Summer (DST): UTC−7 (PDT)
- Area code: 559, 661
- FIPS code: 06-107
- GNIS feature ID: 277318
- Congressional districts: 20th, 21st, 22nd
- Website: tularecounty.ca.gov

Tulare County (/tʊˈlɛəri/ tuu-LAIR-ee) is a county located in the U.S. state of California. As of the 2020 census, the population was 473,117. The county seat is Visalia. The county is named for Tulare Lake, once the largest freshwater lake west of the Great Lakes. Drained for agricultural development, the site is now in Kings County, which was created in 1893 from the western portion of the formerly larger Tulare County.

Tulare County comprises the Visalia-Porterville, CA Metropolitan Statistical Area. The county is located south of Fresno, spanning from the San Joaquin Valley east to the Sierra Nevada.

Sequoia National Park is located in the county, as is part of Kings Canyon National Park, in its northeast corner (shared with Fresno County), and part of Mount Whitney, on its eastern border (shared with Inyo County). As of the 2020 census, the population was 473,117, up from 442,179 at the 2010 census.

== History ==
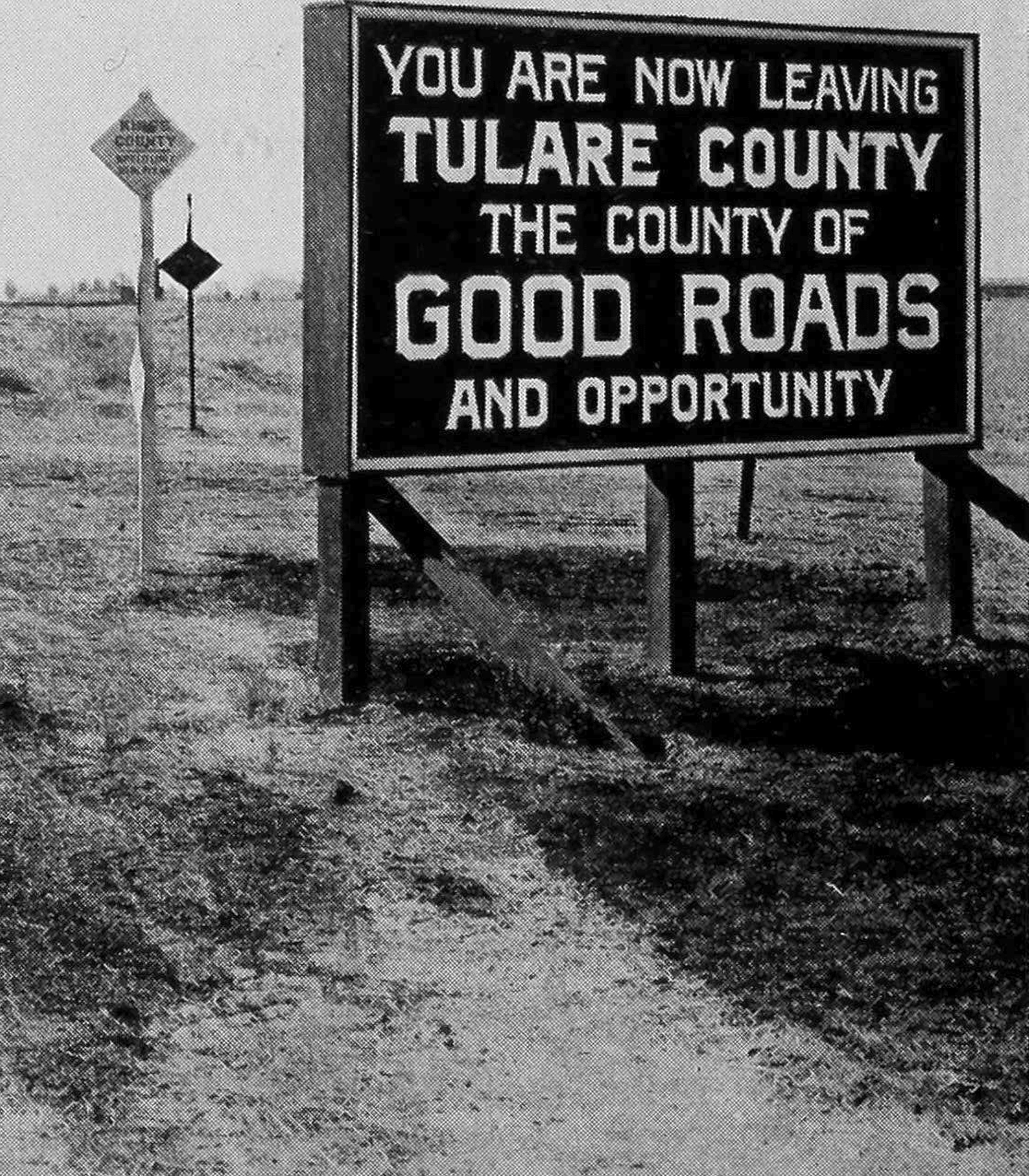
Road sign, 1920

The land was occupied for thousands of years by the Yokuts. Beginning in the eighteenth century, Spain established missions to colonize California and convert the American Indians to Christianity. Comandante Pedro Fages, while hunting for deserters in the Central Valley in 1772, discovered a great lake surrounded by marshes and filled with rushes; he named it Los Tules (the tules). It is from this lake that the county derives its name. The root of the name Tulare is found in the Nahuatl word tullin, designating cattail or similar reeds.

In 1805, 1806 and again in 1816, the Spanish out of Mission San Luis Obispo explored Lake Tulare. Bubal was a native village located on the Western side of Lake Tulare. In 1816, Fr. Luis Martinez of Mission San Luis Obispo arrived at Bubal with soldiers and armed Christian Northern Chumash pressuring the people to send their children for baptism at his mission on the coast. Conflict broke out, and Martinez's party burned Bubal to the ground, destroying the cache of food harvested for the winter. Although Bubal's relationship with the Christian Salinans under Fr. Cabot at Mission San Miguel was better, between 1816 and 1834, Bubal was a center of native resistance. The marshes around Lake Tulare were impenetrable by Spanish horses, which gave the Yokuts a military advantage. At one point, the Spanish considered building a presidio with 100 soldiers at Bubal to control the resistance, but that never came to pass. The Spanish called the natives of the area Tulareños, and before 1816 and after 1834, they were incorporated into Mission San Miguel and Mission San Luis Obispo.

After Mexico achieved independence, it continued to rule California. After the Mexican Cession and the Treaty of Guadalupe Hidalgo in 1848, the area became part of the United States. Tulare County was soon formed from parts of Mariposa County only four years later in 1852. There were two early attempts to split off a new Buena Vista County in 1855 and Coso County in 1864, but both failed. Parts of the county's territory were given to Fresno County in 1856, to Kern County and Inyo County in 1866 and to Kings County in 1893.

The infectious disease Tularemia caused by the bacterium Francisella tularensis is named after Tulare County.

In 1908 Colonel Allen Allensworth and associates founded the town of Allensworth as a black farming community. They intended to develop a place where African Americans could thrive free of white discrimination. It was the only community in California founded, financed and governed by African Americans. While its first years were highly successful, the community encountered environmental problems from dropping water tables which eventually caused it to fail. Today the historic area is preserved as the Colonel Allensworth State Historic Park, which is listed on the National Register of Historic Places.

== Geography ==
According to the U.S. Census Bureau, the county has a total area of 4,839 square miles (12,530 km^{2}), of which 4,823 square miles (12,490 km^{2}) is land and 14 square miles (36 km^{2}), or 0.3%, is water.

=== Adjacent counties ===
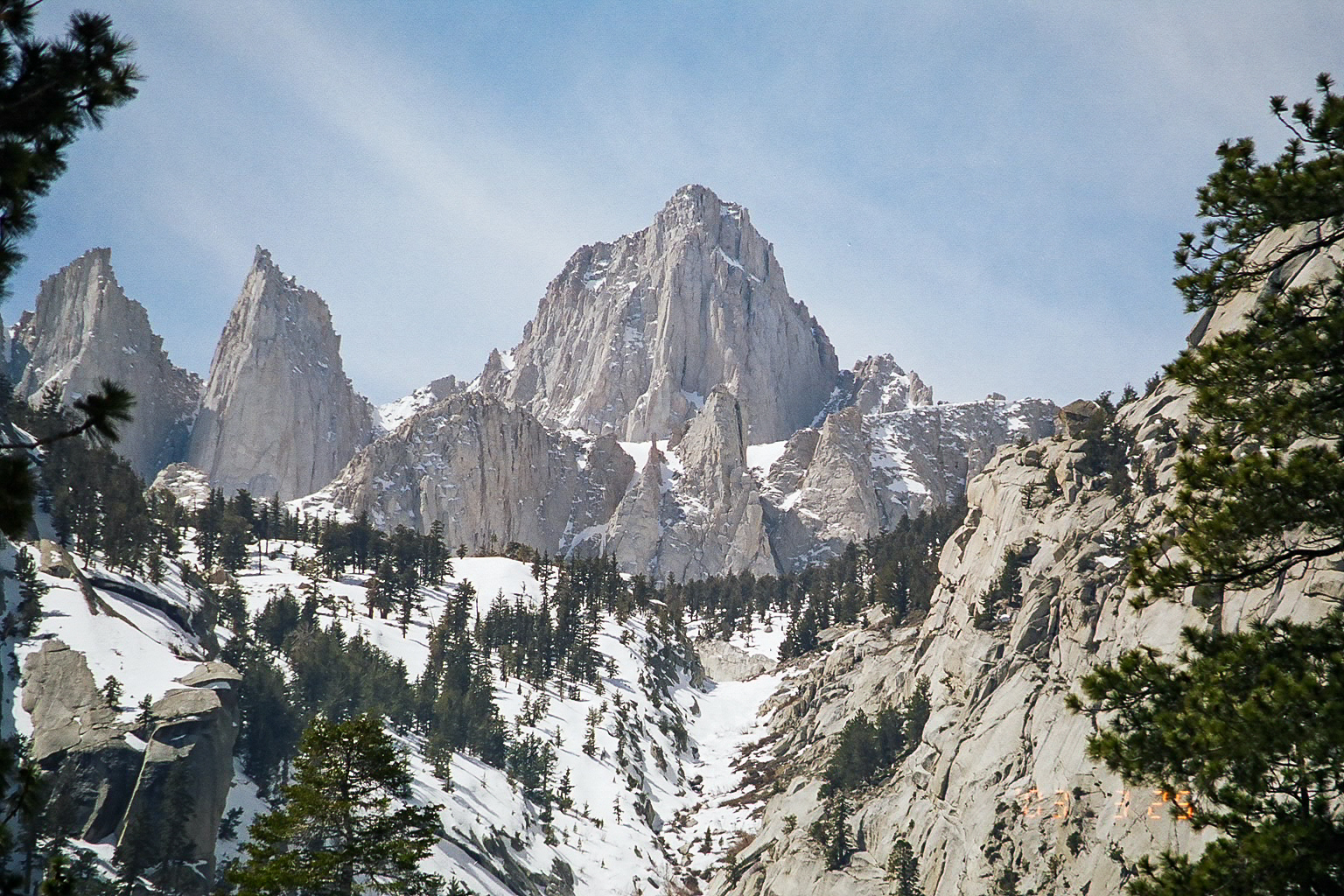
Mount Whitney is located on the Tulare–Inyo county line.

- Fresno County—north
- Inyo County—east
- Kern County—south
- Kings County—west

=== Lakes ===
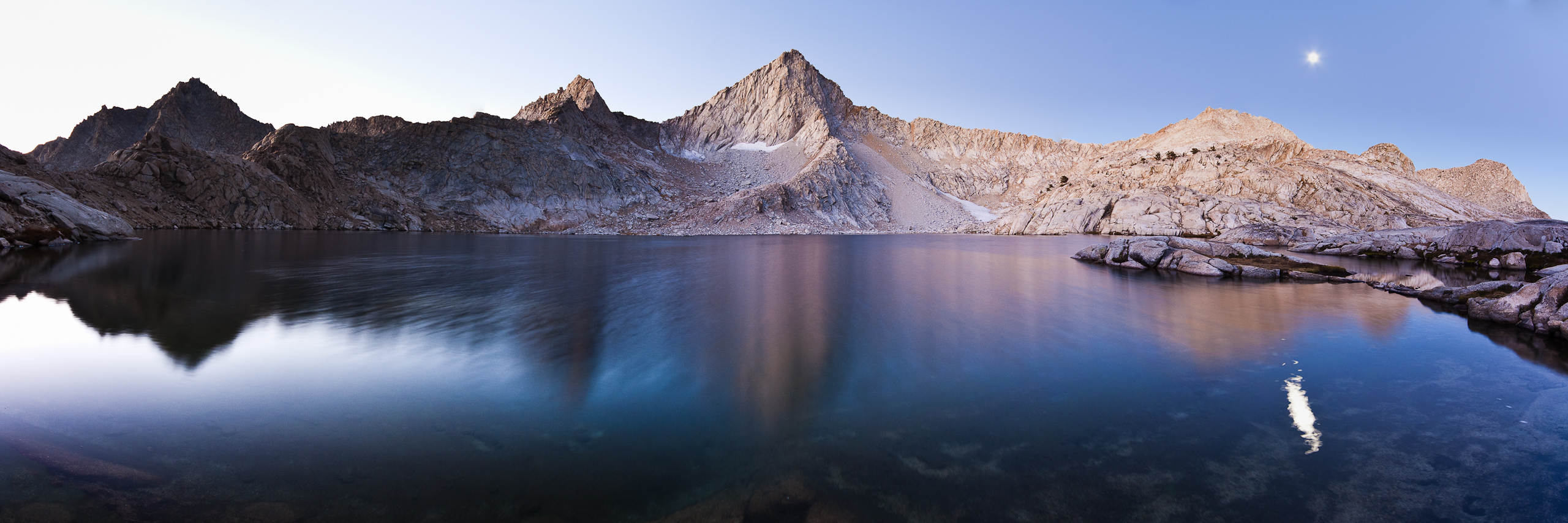
Columbine Lake

- Arctic Lake
- Bullfrog Lakes
- Columbine Lake
- Crescent Lake
- Eagle Lake
- Franklin Lakes
- Lake Kaweah
- Lake Success
- Rockslide Lake
- Rocky Basin Lakes
- Weaver Lake

=== Rivers ===
- Angora River
- Alpine River
- Kaweah River
- Needlerock River
- Monarch River
- Negro River
- St. John's River
- Tule River
- Yokohl River
- Yucca River

=== Parks ===
- Colonel Allensworth State Historic Park
- Alpaugh Park
- Balch Park
- Bartlett Park
- Cutler Park
- Dry Creek Preserve
- Horse Creek Recreation Area
- Kaweah Oaks Preserve
- Kings River Nature Preserve
- Lackeys Cabin
- Lake Kaweah Recreation Area
- Mineral King Game Refuge
- Mooney Grove Park / Ancient Oak Forest Preserve
- Sequoia National Park
- Woodville Park
- West Main Street Park

=== National protected areas ===
- Blue Ridge National Wildlife Refuge
- Giant Sequoia National Monument (part)
- Inyo National Forest (part)
- Kings Canyon National Park (part)
- Pixley National Wildlife Refuge
- Sequoia National Forest (part)
- Sequoia National Park

==== Sequoia National Park ====
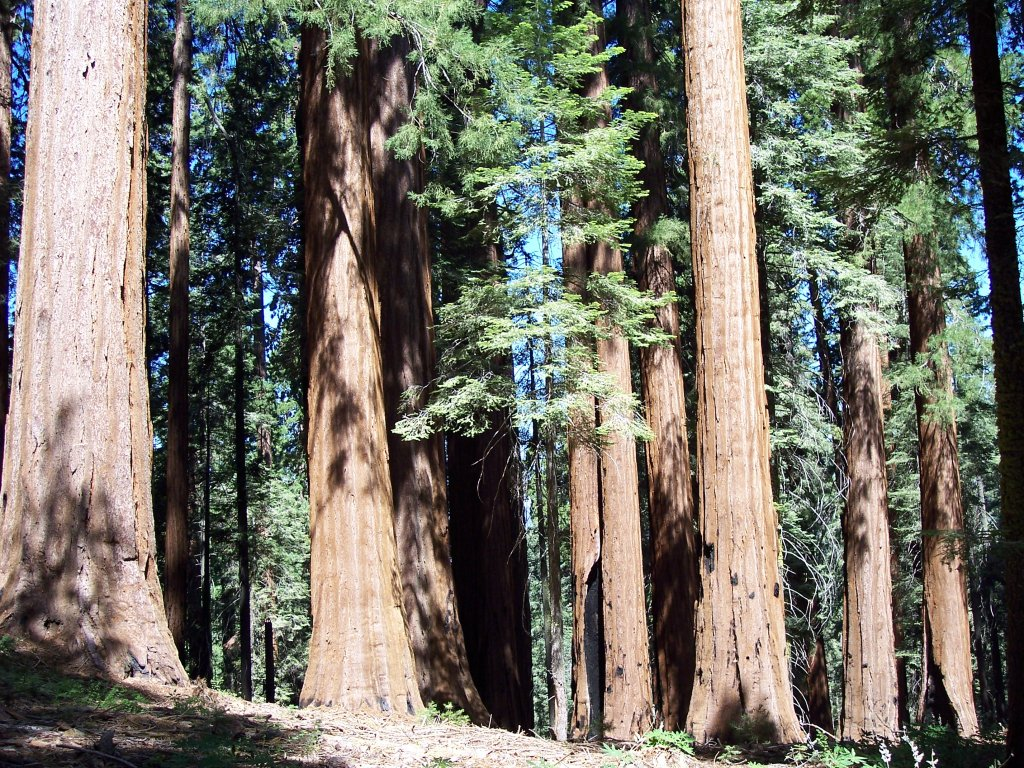
Sequoia National Park is located within Tulare County.

Sequoia National Park is a national park in the southern Sierra Nevada, east of Visalia. It was established in 1890 as the second U.S. national park, after Yellowstone. The park spans 404,051 acres (1,635.14 km^{2}). Encompassing a vertical relief of nearly 13,000 feet (3,962 m), the park contains among its natural resources the highest point in the contiguous 48 United States, Mount Whitney, at 14,505 feet (4,421 m) above sea level. The park is south of and contiguous with Kings Canyon National Park; the two are administered by the National Park Service as one unit, called Sequoia and Kings Canyon National Parks.

=== Flora ===
Tulare County is rich in native plant species due in part to a diversity in habitats, including creeks, rivers, hills, and mountains. Native plants include incense cedar (Calocedrus decurrens), valley oak (Quercus lobata), California bay (Umbellularia californica), manzanita (Arctostaphylos manzanita), Salvia spathacea, mountain mahogany (Cercocarpus betuloides), milkweed (Asclepias speciosa), Epilobium cleistogamum, monkeyflower (Mimulus), Penstemon, California melic (Melica californica), and deer grass (Muhlenbergia rigens).

== Government and policing ==
=== Administration ===
Tulare County operates as a general law county under the California Constitution. That is, it does not have a county charter. The county is governed by a five-member Board of Supervisors. Supervisors are elected by districts for four-year terms. There are no term limits in effect. The chairman and vice-chairman are elected annually by the Board of Supervisors from among its members.

=== Sheriff ===
The Tulare County Sheriff’s Office provides court protection, county jail operation, patrol and detective functions in the unincorporated areas of the county. Incorporated cities have municipal police departments or contract with the Sheriff’s Office for their police operations. The main sheriff's name is Mike Boudreaux.

== Transportation ==
=== Major highways ===
- State Route 43
- State Route 63
- State Route 65
- State Route 99
- State Route 137
- State Route 180
- State Route 190
- State Route 198
- State Route 201
- State Route 216
- State Route 245

=== Public transportation ===
Tulare County Area Transit (TCaT) provides an intracounty bus service linking the population centers. One TCaT route connects to Delano in Kern County.

The cities of Tulare, Porterville, and Visalia have their own local intracity bus services.

Greyhound Lines provides long-distance, intercity bus service outside the county.

=== Airports ===
The Porterville Municipal Airport, located 3 nautical miles (3.5 mi; 5.6 km) from Downtown Porterville. The airport offers general aviation to the public; it is also home to Porterville Air Attack Base on the south part of the airport. The Visalia Municipal Airport is a city-owned airport for the city of Visalia, California. Mefford Field is a city-owned general aviation airport located in Tulare.

The nearest full-operation commercial airports are Bakersfield's Meadows Field Airport to the south, and Fresno's Fresno Yosemite International Airport to the north. V-LINE buses operate daily service between the Visalia Transit Center and the Fresno Airport.

== Crime ==
The following table includes the number of incidents reported and the rate per 1,000 persons for each type of offense, as of 2019.

Population and crime rates
Population	473,117	
Violent crime	334	0.70
Homicide	9	0.01
Forcible rape	30	0.06
Robbery	64	0.13
Aggravated assault	231	0.48
Property crime	1,893	4.00
Burglary	637	1.34
Larceny-theft (Note: Only larceny-theft cases involving property over $400 in value are reported as property crimes.)	1,254	2.65
Motor vehicle theft	2	0.004
Arson	0	0.00

=== Cities by population and crime rates ===
Cities by population and crime rates
City	Population	Violent crimes	Violent crime rate per 1,000 persons	Property crimes	Property crime rate per 1,000 persons
Dinuba	24,685	161	6.52	530	21.47
Exeter	10,557	26	2.46	265	25.10
Farmersville	10,781	35	3.24	190	17.62
Lindsay	13,708	69	5.03	250	18.23
Porterville	60,209	192	3.18	1,297	21.54
Tulare	65,134	261	4.00	1,469	22.55
Visalia	134,961	586	4.34	3,900	28.89
Woodlake	7,682	28	3.64	88	11.45

== Demographics ==
Historical population
Census	Pop.	Note	%±
1860	4,638		—
1870	4,533		−2.3%
1880	11,281		148.9%
1890	24,574		117.8%
1900	18,375		−25.2%
1910	35,440		92.9%
1920	59,031		66.6%
1930	77,442		31.2%
1940	107,152		38.4%
1950	149,264		39.3%
1960	168,403		12.8%
1970	188,322		11.8%
1980	245,738		30.5%
1990	311,921		26.9%
2000	368,021		18.0%
2010	442,179		20.2%
2020	473,117		7.0%
2025 (est.)	485,146	▲	2.5%
U.S. Decennial Census; 1860–1870 1880–1890; 1900 1910 1920; 1930 1940 1950; 1960 1970 1980; 1990 2000 2010

=== 2020 census ===
As of the 2020 census, the county had a population of 473,117 and a median age of 32.3 years; 30.0% of residents were under the age of 18 and 12.2% were 65 years of age or older. For every 100 females there were 98.4 males, and for every 100 females age 18 and over there were 96.5 males.

The racial makeup was 39.4% White, 1.4% Black or African American, 2.2% American Indian and Alaska Native, 3.6% Asian, 0.2% Native Hawaiian and Pacific Islander, 34.9% from some other race, and 18.3% from two or more races; Hispanic or Latino residents of any race comprised 65.5% of the population.

According to Census 2020, 3.7% of residents reported German ancestry, 3.2% English, 2.8% Irish, 2.4% Portuguese, and 2.3% American, while 48.7% spoke English, 47.4% Spanish, and 1.0% Indo-European languages as their first language.

79.9% of residents lived in urban areas, while 20.1% lived in rural areas.

There were 141,987 households, of which 45.9% had children under the age of 18 living with them, 24.6% had a female householder with no spouse or partner present, 16.8% of households were made up of individuals, and 7.8% had someone living alone who was 65 years of age or older. Of all households, 52.5% were married couples living together, 15.2% had a male householder with no spouse present, 20.8% were non-families, and the average household and family sizes were 3.20 and 3.57 respectively.

There were 150,652 housing units, of which 5.8% were vacant; among occupied units, 58.5% were owner-occupied and 41.5% were renter-occupied, with homeowner and rental vacancy rates of 1.1% and 3.6%, respectively.

The population density was 98.1 people per square mile (37.9 people/km^{2}).

The median income for a household in the county was $57,692, and the median income for a family was $53,330. The per capita income for the county was $23,096. About 18.8% of the population were below the poverty line, including 26.0% of those under age 18 and 13.8% of those age 65 or over.

=== Racial and ethnic composition ===
Tulare County, California – Racial and ethnic composition Note: the US Census treats Hispanic/Latino as an ethnic category. This table excludes Latinos from the racial categories and assigns them to a separate category. Hispanics/Latinos may be of any race.
Race / Ethnicity (NH = Non-Hispanic)	Pop 1980	Pop 1990	Pop 2000	Pop 2010	Pop 2020	% 1980	% 1990	% 2000	% 2010	% 2020
White alone (NH)	159,996	170,283	153,916	143,935	125,022	65.11%	54.59%	41.82%	32.55%	26.43%
Black or African American alone (NH)	3,448	4,305	5,122	5,497	5,332	1.40%	1.38%	1.39%	1.24%	1.13%
Native American or Alaska Native alone (NH)	2,558	3,228	3,011	3,323	3,458	1.04%	1.03%	0.82%	0.75%	0.73%
Asian alone (NH)	5,066	12,468	11,457	14,204	15,997	2.06%	4.00%	3.11%	3.21%	3.38%
Native Hawaiian or Pacific Islander alone (NH)	x	x	257	370	511	x	x	0.07%	0.08%	0.11%
Other race alone (NH)	1,372	744	444	641	2,132	0.56%	0.24%	0.12%	0.14%	0.45%
Mixed race or Multiracial (NH)	x	x	6,968	6,144	10,770	x	x	1.89%	1.39%	2.28%
Hispanic or Latino (any race)	73,298	120,893	186,846	268,065	309,895	29.83%	38.76%	50.77%	60.62%	65.50%
Total	245,738	311,921	368,021	442,179	473,117	100.00%	100.00%	100.00%	100.00%	100.00%

=== American Community Survey 2025 data ===
The United States Census Bureau estimated that in 2025, Tulare County’s population was 485.146. It was also estimated that the county's population was 24,14% Non-Hispanic White, 68,18% Hispanic or Latino, 1,32% Non-Hispanic Black, 3,59% Asian, 0,70% Native American, 0,10% Pacific Islander, and 1,96% Multiracial.

Total	Population	Percentage
Non-Hispanic White	117.114	24,14%
Hispanic or Latino	330.768	68,18%
Non-Hispanic Black	6.412	1,32%
Asian	17.434	3,59%
Native American	3.419	0,70%
Pacific Islander	508	0,10%
Non-Hispanic Multiracial	9.491	1,96%

=== 2010 Census ===
The 2010 United States census reported that Tulare County had a population of 442,179. The racial makeup of Tulare County was 265,618 (60.1%) White, 7,196 (1.6%) African American, 6,993 (1.6%) Native American, 15,176 (3.4%) Asian, 509 (0.1%) Pacific Islander, 128,263 (29.0%) from other races, and 18,424 (4.2%) from two or more races. There were 268,065 people (60.6%) of Hispanic or Latino origin, of any race.

Population reported at 2010 United States census
The County	Total; Population	White	African; American	Native; American	Asian	Pacific; Islander	other races	two or more races	Hispanic or Latino (of any race)
Tulare County	442,179	265,618	7,196	6,993	15,176	509	128,263	18,424	268,065
Incorporated cities	Total; Population	White	African; American	Native; American	Asian	Pacific; Islander	other races	two or more races	Hispanic or Latino (of any race)
Dinuba	21,453	11,166	141	193	454	17	8,630	852	18,114
Exeter	10,334	7,150	67	171	138	8	2,416	384	4,703
Farmersville	10,588	5,295	60	213	72	5	4,494	449	8,876
Lindsay	11,768	6,480	85	128	267	4	4,367	437	10,056
Porterville	54,165	31,847	673	1,007	2,521	64	15,482	2,571	33,549
Tulare	59,278	36,347	2,328	694	1,276	80	15,713	2,840	34,062
Visalia	124,442	80,203	2,627	1,730	6,768	164	27,249	5,701	57,262
Woodlake	7,279	3,691	37	108	52	9	3,072	310	6,381
Census-designated places	Total; Population	White	African; American	Native; American	Asian	Pacific; Islander	other races	two or more races	Hispanic or Latino (of any race)
Allensworth	471	158	22	0	8	0	279	4	436
Alpaugh	1,026	381	4	11	4	0	597	29	867
California Hot Springs	37	34	0	0	1	0	0	2	3
Camp Nelson	97	94	0	0	0	0	2	1	6
Cedar Slope	0	0	0	0	0	0	0	0	0
Cutler	5,000	2,421	50	53	64	1	2,241	170	4,829
Delft Colony	454	213	13	0	0	0	224	4	428
Ducor	612	251	0	15	20	0	302	24	502
Earlimart	8,537	3,193	67	45	536	0	4,303	393	7,805
East Orosi	495	209	0	5	2	1	261	17	466
East Porterville	6,767	3,660	65	153	102	58	2,431	298	4,930
East Tulare Villa	778	491	9	6	10	0	226	36	428
El Rancho	124	71	1	1	0	0	49	2	117
Goshen	3,006	1,186	76	90	11	1	1,496	146	2,482
Hartland	30	27	3	0	0	0	0	0	0
Idlewild	43	43	0	0	0	0	0	0	0
Ivanhoe	4,495	2,002	19	80	29	1	2,221	143	3,752
Kennedy Meadows	28	25	0	1	0	0	2	0	3
Lemon Cove	308	261	0	5	3	2	12	25	76
Lindcove	406	284	2	15	0	0	96	9	197
Linnell Camp	849	397	3	18	8	0	393	30	832
London	1,869	761	6	46	0	0	976	80	1,737
Matheny	1,212	651	44	24	4	0	436	53	890
McClenney Tract	10	9	0	0	0	0	0	1	0
Monson	188	121	1	5	4	0	57	0	147
Orosi	8,770	3,861	65	57	803	1	3,638	345	7,606
Panorama Heights	41	35	1	1	0	0	4	0	4
Patterson Tract	1,752	999	0	33	73	0	577	70	1,133
Pierpoint	52	51	0	0	0	0	1	0	1
Pine Flat	166	158	0	3	3	0	0	2	11
Pixley	3,310	1,473	90	28	16	0	1,587	116	2,675
Plainview	945	358	8	20	2	0	517	40	865
Ponderosa	16	13	0	0	0	0	1	2	4
Poplar-Cotton Center	2,470	1,729	1	15	356	0	327	42	1,809
Posey	10	6	0	3	0	0	0	1	3
Poso Park	9	9	0	0	0	0	0	0	0
Richgrove	2,882	1,068	20	38	140	7	1,521	88	2,705
Rodriguez Camp	156	51	0	0	0	0	98	7	151
Sequoia Crest	10	10	0	0	0	0	0	0	0
Seville	480	200	0	5	0	0	259	16	458
Silver City	0	0	0	0	0	0	0	0	0
Springville	934	836	5	20	7	0	25	41	109
Strathmore	2,819	1,490	12	41	7	1	1,162	106	2,238
Sugarloaf Mountain Park	0	0	0	0	0	0	0	0	0
Sugarloaf Saw Mill	18	14	0	0	0	0	1	3	4
Sugarloaf Village	10	9	0	0	0	0	0	1	2
Sultana	775	315	0	3	6	0	424	27	695
Terra Bella	3,310	1,426	5	20	75	2	1,733	49	2,894
Teviston	1,214	449	50	9	10	0	640	56	1,039
Three Rivers	2,182	1,976	7	27	31	1	75	65	212
Tipton	2,543	1,535	3	15	9	0	924	57	2,147
Tonyville	316	178	0	0	12	0	115	11	286
Tooleville	339	145	5	19	8	2	148	12	279
Traver	713	302	1	22	6	2	357	23	551
Waukena	108	86	0	3	0	0	19	0	45
West Goshen	511	276	2	10	7	0	195	21	358
Wilsonia	5	5	0	0	0	0	0	0	0
Woodville	1,740	1,345	1	31	6	0	324	33	1,545
Yettem	211	48	5	0	0	0	148	10	199
Other unincorporated areas	Total; Population	White	African; American	Native; American	Asian	Pacific; Islander	other races	two or more races	Hispanic or Latino (of any race)
All others not CDPs (combined)	67,213	46,040	512	1,753	1,245	78	15,416	2,169	34,101

=== 2000 Census ===
As of the census of 2000, there were 368,021 people, 110,385 households, and 87,093 families residing in the county. The population density was 76 people per square mile (29 people/km^{2}). There were 119,639 housing units at an average density of 25 units per square mile (9.7 units/km^{2}). The racial makeup of the county was 58.1% White, 1.6% Black or African American, 1.6% Native American, 3.3% Asian, 0.1% Pacific Islander, 30.8% from other races, and 4.6% from two or more races. 50.8% of the population were Hispanic or Latino of any race. 6.2% were of American, 5.7% German and 5.0% English ancestry according to Census 2000. 56.3% spoke English, 38.9% Spanish and 1.1% Portuguese as their first language.

There were 110,385 households, out of which 44.9% had children under the age of 18 living with them, 58.1% were married couples living together, 14.5% had a female householder with no husband present, and 21.1% were non-families. 17.1% of all households were made up of individuals, and 7.7% had someone living alone who was 65 years of age or older. The average household size was 3.28 and the average family size was 3.67.

In the county, the population was spread out, with 33.8% under the age of 18, 10.6% from 18 to 24, 27.6% from 25 to 44, 18.2% from 45 to 64, and 9.8% who were 65 years of age or older. The median age was 29 years. For every 100 females there were 100.0 males. For every 100 females age 18 and over, there were 97.7 males.

The median income for a household in the county was $33,983, and the median income for a family was $36,297. Males had a median income of $30,892 versus $24,589 for females. The per capita income for the county was $14,006. About 18.8% of families and 23.9% of the population were below the poverty line, including 32.6% of those under age 18 and 10.5% of those age 65 or over.

== Metropolitan Statistical Area ==
The United States Office of Management and Budget has designated Tulare County as the Visalia-Porterville, CA Metropolitan Statistical Area. The United States Census Bureau ranked the Visalia-Porterville, CA Metropolitan Statistical Area as the 111th most populous metropolitan statistical area of the United States as of July 1, 2012.

The Office of Management and Budget has further designated the Visalia-Porterville, CA Metropolitan Statistical Area as a component of the more extensive Visalia-Porterville-Hanford, CA Combined Statistical Area, the 80th most populous combined statistical area and the 92nd most populous primary statistical area of the United States as of July 1, 2012.

According to the United States Census Bureau, Tulare County is the 7th largest county in California by total area.

== Politics ==
=== Voter registration statistics ===
Population and registered voters
Total population	473,117	
Registered voters (Note: Percentage of registered voters with respect to total population. Percentages of party members with respect to registered voters follow.)	202,825	33.2%
Democratic	67,325	33.19%
Republican	77,175	38.05%
Democratic–Republican spread	-9,850	-4.9%
American Independent	7,701	3.8%
Green	545	0.27%
Libertarian	2,111	1.04%
Peace and Freedom	1,066	0.53%
Unknown	1,703	0.84%
Other	963	0.47%
No party preference	44,236	21.81%

==== Cities by population and voter registration ====
Cities by population and voter registration
City	Population	Registered voters	Democratic	Republican	Others	No party preference
Dinuba	24,685	37.22%	43.65%	26.74%	5.73%	23.86%
Exeter	10,557	49.92%	25.89%	47.37%	7.87%	18.85%
Farmersville	10,781	34.36%	40.91%	21.37%	7.1%	30.6%
Lindsay	13,708	28.63%	45.45%	19.92%	6.39%	28.22%
Porterville	60,209	40.03%	35.14%	33.39%	7.42%	24.03%
Tulare	65,134	45.77%	32.58%	38.27%	7.01%	22.12%
Visalia	134,691	54.04%	31.25%	40.74%	7.33%	20.66%
Woodlake	7,682	34.93%	48.21%	20.41%	6.29%	25.07%

=== Overview ===
Tulare is a strongly Republican county in presidential and congressional elections. The last Democratic candidate for president to win a majority in the county was Lyndon Johnson in 1964. In the 2016 presidential election, Republican candidate and overall winner, Donald Trump, won Tulare by a 9.54% margin of victory, the closest margin of victory for a Republican in the county since Richard Nixon's 8.37% margin in 1960. The Republican advantage narrowed further in the 2020 presidential election when Donald Trump won the county by a 7.81% margin despite losing nationally to Joe Biden, the closest margin of victory for a Republican in the county since Dwight D. Eisenhower's 5.33% margin in 1956.

United States presidential election results for Tulare County, California (Note: This total comprised 4,283 votes for Progressive Theodore Roosevelt (who was official Republican nominee in California), 1,233 votes for Socialist Eugene V. Debs and 265 votes for Prohibition Party nominee Eugene W. Chafin.)
Year	Republican		Democratic		Third party(ies)	
Year	No.	%	No.	%	No.	%
1880	917	38.71%	1,306	55.13%	146	6.16%
1884	1,268	40.15%	1,691	53.55%	199	6.30%
1888	2,275	43.82%	2,637	50.79%	280	5.39%
1892	1,984	31.96%	2,613	42.09%	1,611	25.95%
1896	1,410	33.80%	2,673	64.07%	89	2.13%
1900	1,755	41.41%	2,246	53.00%	237	5.59%
1904	2,221	48.61%	1,643	35.96%	705	15.43%
1908	2,742	47.95%	2,329	40.73%	647	11.32%
1912	73	0.72%	4,293	42.31%	5,781	56.97%
1916	6,845	43.96%	7,299	46.87%	1,428	9.17%
1920	9,136	61.26%	4,837	32.43%	941	6.31%
1924	9,484	50.79%	3,425	18.34%	5,765	30.87%
1928	12,057	63.76%	6,635	35.09%	218	1.15%
1932	8,066	32.27%	15,631	62.53%	1,302	5.21%
1936	8,624	30.78%	18,956	67.66%	435	1.55%
1940	15,414	42.85%	20,129	55.96%	428	1.19%
1944	16,005	49.30%	16,221	49.97%	238	0.73%
1948	18,414	46.98%	19,681	50.22%	1,097	2.80%
1952	30,108	57.07%	22,208	42.10%	437	0.83%
1956	26,051	52.50%	23,407	47.17%	160	0.32%
1960	29,456	53.97%	24,887	45.60%	239	0.44%
1964	22,527	39.83%	33,974	60.08%	51	0.09%
1968	29,314	52.17%	22,180	39.47%	4,695	8.36%
1972	36,048	59.93%	21,775	36.20%	2,327	3.87%
1976	31,864	54.52%	25,551	43.72%	1,027	1.76%
1980	41,317	58.32%	25,155	35.51%	4,374	6.17%
1984	51,066	63.88%	28,065	35.11%	812	1.02%
1988	46,891	59.61%	30,711	39.04%	1,067	1.36%
1992	40,482	45.71%	31,188	35.22%	16,883	19.07%
1996	46,272	53.90%	32,669	38.06%	6,905	8.04%
2000	54,070	60.20%	33,006	36.75%	2,742	3.05%
2004	65,399	66.15%	32,494	32.87%	967	0.98%
2008	59,765	56.64%	43,634	41.35%	2,126	2.01%
2012	56,956	56.24%	41,752	41.22%	2,571	2.54%
2016	58,299	51.09%	47,585	41.70%	8,218	7.20%
2020	77,579	52.82%	66,105	45.00%	3,201	2.18%
2024	81,854	59.18%	53,221	38.48%	3,234	2.34%

In the United States House of Representatives, Tulare County is split between three congressional districts:

- California's 20th congressional district, represented by Republican Vince Fong
- California's 21st congressional district, represented by Democrat Jim Costa and
- California's 22nd congressional district, represented by Republican David Valadao.

In the California State Senate, it is split between two legislative districts:

- the 12th Senate District, represented by Republican Shannon Grove.
- the 16th senatorial district, represented by Democrat Melissa Hurtado.

In the California State Assembly, the county is represented by the 33rd Assembly district, represented by Republican Devon Mathis, and the 32nd Assembly district, represented by Republican Stan Ellis.

== Economy ==
The dairy industry, with sales of milk products, brings in the most revenue for the county, typically more than US$1 billion a year annually. Oranges, grapes, and cattle-related commodities also earn hundreds of millions of dollars annually.

In 2001, Tulare became the most productive county in the U.S. in terms of agricultural revenues, at US$3.5 billion annually. It surpassed Fresno County's US$3.2 billion, which had held the top spot for over two decades. Due to the importance of agriculture in the county as well as its location in the state, since 1968 the city of Tulare has been the site of the annual World Ag Expo, the world's largest agricultural exposition.

Minor league sports teams, such as the baseball Visalia Rawhide of the class-A level California League (an affiliate to the Arizona Diamondbacks), two teams of the Minor League Football Association in Tulare and Visalia, and four teams of the Central California Basketball League based in Porterville, attract many residents and add to the amenities in the county.

=== Top employers ===
According to the county's 2020 Comprehensive Annual Financial Report, the top employers in the county are:

#	Employer	# of Employees
1	County of Tulare	5,106
2	Visalia Unified School District	3,355
3	Kaweah Delta Medical Center	2,000
4	Sierra View District Hospital	1,800
5	Ruiz Food Production, Inc	1,800
6	Wal-Mart Distribution Center	1,692
7	Porterville Developmental Center	1,173
8	College of the Sequoias	1,160
9	Jostens	720
10	City of Visalia	653

== Utilities and infrastructure ==
Electricity service in Tulare County is provided by Southern California Edison and PG&E. Gas is provided by SoCalGas and PG&E. TV and Internet service is provided by several companies, such as Spectrum, DISH, DirecTV and HughesNET.

== Communities ==
=== Cities ===
- Dinuba
- Exeter
- Farmersville
- Lindsay
- Porterville
- Tulare
- Visalia (county seat)
- Woodlake

=== Census designated places ===
- Allensworth
- Alpaugh
- California Hot Springs
- Camp Nelson
- Cedar Slope
- Cutler
- Delft Colony
- Ducor
- Earlimart
- East Orosi
- East Porterville
- East Tulare Villa
- El Monte Mobile Village
- El Rancho
- Goshen
- Hartland
- Hypericum
- Idlewild
- Ivanhoe
- Jovista
- Kennedy Meadows
- Lemon Cove
- Lindcove
- Linnell Camp
- London
- Matheny
- McClenney Tract
- Monson
- Orosi
- Panorama Heights
- Patterson Tract
- Pierpoint
- Pine Flat
- Pixley
- Plainview
- Ponderosa
- Poplar-Cotton Center
- Posey
- Poso Park
- Richgrove
- Rodriguez Camp
- Sequoia Crest
- Seville
- Silver City
- Springville
- Strathmore
- Sugarloaf Saw Mill
- Sugarloaf Village
- Sultana
- Terra Bella
- Teviston
- Three Rivers
- Tipton
- Tonyville
- Tooleville
- Traver
- Waukena
- West Goshen
- Wilsonia
- Woodville
- Woodville Farm Labor Camp
- Yettem

=== Former census designated places ===
- Sugarloaf Mountain Park

=== Other unincorporated communities ===
- Advance
- Angiola
- Badger
- Balance Rock
- Cairns Corner
- Calgro
- Johnsondale
- Kaweah
- Rocky Hill
- Ultra
- White River
- Yokohl Valley
- Zante

=== Indian reservation ===
- Tule River Indian Reservation

=== Population ranking ===
The population ranking of the following table is based on the 2020 census of Tulare County.

† county seat

Rank	City/Town/etc.	Municipal type	Population (2020 Census)
1	† Visalia	City	154,048
2	Tulare	City	77,101
3	Porterville	City	77,681
4	Dinuba	City	34,855
5	Lindsay	City	17,729
6	Farmersville	City	10,397
7	Exeter	City	10,334
8	Orosi	CDP	8,329
9	Earlimart	CDP	7,679
10	East Porterville	CDP	5,549
11	Woodlake	City	7,419
12	Cutler	CDP	4,480
13	Ivanhoe	CDP	4,468
t-14	Pixley	CDP	3,828
t-14	Terra Bella	CDP	2,910
15	Goshen	CDP	4,968
16	Richgrove	CDP	2,358
17	Strathmore	CDP	2,830
18	Tipton	CDP	2,519
19	Poplar-Cotton Center	CDP	2,370
20	Three Rivers	CDP	2,053
21	London	CDP	1,518
22	Patterson Tract	CDP	1,888
23	Woodville	CDP	1,680
24	Teviston	CDP	1,185
25	Matheny	CDP	1,125
26	Tule River Reservation	AIAN	1,250
27	Alpaugh	CDP	1,026
28	Plainview	CDP	871
29	Springville	CDP	967
30	Linnell Camp	CDP	696
31	East Tulare Villa	CDP	773
32	Sultana	CDP	779
33	Traver	CDP	731
34	Ducor	CDP	616
35	West Goshen	CDP	536
36	East Orosi	CDP	423
37	Seville	CDP	446
38	Allensworth	CDP	531
39	Delft Colony	CDP	412
40	Lindcove	CDP	189
41	Tooleville	CDP	286
42	Tonyville	CDP	329
43	Lemon Cove	CDP	298
44	Yettem	CDP	201
45	Monson	CDP	152
46	Pine Flat	CDP	206
47	Rodriguez Camp	CDP	133
48	El Rancho	CDP	96
49	Waukena	CDP	80
50	Camp Nelson	CDP	106
51	Pierpoint	CDP	59
52	Idlewild	CDP	32
53	Panorama Heights	CDP	44
54	California Hot Springs	CDP	50
55	Hartland	CDP	69
56	Kennedy Meadows	CDP	58
57	Sugarloaf Saw Mill	CDP	14
58	Ponderosa	CDP	51
t-59	McClenney Tract	CDP	15
t-59	Posey	CDP	23
t-59	Sequoia Crest	CDP	24
t-59	Sugarloaf Village	CDP	7
60	Poso Park	CDP	9
61	Wilsonia	CDP	14
t-62	Cedar Slope	CDP	10
t-62	Silver City	CDP	0
t-62	Sugarloaf Mountain Park	CDP	0

== Education ==
Unified (full K-12) school districts include:

- Alpaugh Unified School District
- Corcoran Joint Unified School District
- Cutler-Orosi Joint Unified School District
- Dinuba Unified School District (includes some areas for grades PreK-12 and some for grades 9-12 only)
- Exeter Unified School District (includes some areas for grades PreK-12 and some for grades 9-12 only)
- Farmersville Unified School District
- Kings Canyon Joint Unified School District
- Lindsay Unified School District
- Porterville Unified School District (includes some areas for grades PreK-12 and some for grades 9-12 only)
- Visalia Unified School District
- Woodlake Unified School District (includes some areas for grades PreK-12 and some for grades 9-12 only)

Secondary school districts include:

- Delano Joint Union High School District
- Hanford Joint Union High School District
- Kingsburg Joint Union High School District
- Tulare Joint Union High School District

Elementary school districts include:

- Allensworth Elementary School District
- Alta Vista Elementary School District
- Buena Vista Elementary School District
- Burton Elementary School District
- Clay Joint Elementary School District
- Columbine Elementary School District
- Ducor Union Elementary School District
- Earlimart Elementary School District
- Hope Elementary School District
- Hot Springs Elementary School District
- Kings River Union Elementary School District
- Kingsburg Elementary Charter School District
- Kit Carson Union Elementary School District
- Liberty Elementary School District
- Linns Valley-Poso Flat Union School District
- Monson-Sultana Joint Union Elementary School District
- Oak Valley Union Elementary School District
- Outside Creek Elementary School District
- Palo Verde Union Elementary School District
- Pixley Union Elementary School District
- Pleasant View Elementary School District
- Richgrove Elementary School District
- Rockford Elementary School District
- Saucelito Elementary School District
- Sequoia Union Elementary School District
- Springville Union Elementary School District
- Stone Corral Elementary School District
- Strathmore Union Elementary School District
- Sundale Union Elementary School District
- Sunnyside Union Elementary School District
- Terra Bella Union Elementary School District
- Three Rivers Union Elementary School District
- Tipton Elementary School District
- Traver Joint Elementary School District
- Tulare City Elementary School District
- Waukena Joint Union Elementary School District
- Woodville Elementary School District

== See also ==
- List of museums in the San Joaquin Valley
- National Register of Historic Places listings in Tulare County, California
- Tulare Lake
- Tule (Schoenoplectus acutus)
