= Poso Park, California =

Poso Park
- census-designated place
- Location in Tulare County and the state of California

- Position in California.
- Coordinates: 35°48′41″N 118°38′12″W
- Country: United States
- State: California
- County: Tulare

Area
  - Total: 0.044 sq mi (0.113 km^{2})
  - Land: 0.044 sq mi (0.113 km^{2})
  - Water: 0 sq mi (0 km^{2}) 0%
- Elevation: 4,662 ft (1,421 m)

Population (2020)
  - Total: 9
  - Density: 210/sq mi (80/km^{2})
- Time zone: UTC-8 (Pacific (PST))
  - Summer (DST): UTC-7 (PDT)
- GNIS feature ID: 2585442

Poso Park is a census-designated place (CDP) in Tulare County, California, United States. Poso Park sits at an elevation of 4,662 feet (1,421 m). The 2020 United States census reported Poso Park's population was 9, remaining even with the count of 9 at the 2010 census.

== Geography ==
According to the United States Census Bureau, the CDP covers an area of 0.04 square mile (0.11 km^{2}), all land.

=== Climate ===
Climate data for Poso Park
Month	Jan	Feb	Mar	Apr	May	Jun	Jul	Aug	Sep	Oct	Nov	Dec	Year
Mean daily maximum °F (°C)	49.5 (9.7)	50.7 (10.4)	51.8 (11.0)	55.3 (12.9)	65.0 (18.3)	74.5 (23.6)	82.5 (28.1)	82.0 (27.8)	76.0 (24.4)	66.2 (19.0)	56.2 (13.4)	50.6 (10.3)	63.4 (17.4)
Daily mean °F (°C)	38.8 (3.8)	39.4 (4.1)	41.3 (5.2)	45.6 (7.6)	52.0 (11.1)	59.8 (15.4)	67.0 (19.4)	66.6 (19.2)	61.1 (16.2)	53.1 (11.7)	44.5 (6.9)	39.8 (4.3)	50.8 (10.4)
Mean daily minimum °F (°C)	27.9 (−2.3)	29.1 (−1.6)	30.5 (−0.8)	32.6 (0.3)	38.9 (3.8)	44.9 (7.2)	51.5 (10.8)	51.1 (10.6)	46.1 (7.8)	39.9 (4.4)	32.7 (0.4)	28.8 (−1.8)	37.8 (3.2)
Average precipitation inches (mm)	5.48 (139)	4.64 (118)	4.69 (119)	3.24 (82)	1.09 (28)	0.34 (8.6)	0.02 (0.51)	0.24 (6.1)	0.61 (15)	1.25 (32)	3.01 (76)	4.68 (119)	29.29 (743.21)
Average snowfall inches (cm)	11.0 (28)	9.4 (24)	10.5 (27)	10.0 (25)	1.1 (2.8)	0.0 (0.0)	0.0 (0.0)	0.0 (0.0)	0.0 (0.0)	0.1 (0.25)	3.7 (9.4)	9.2 (23)	55 (139.45)
Source: WRCC

== Demographics ==
Historical population
Census	Pop.	Note	%±
2010	9		—
2020	9		0.0%
U.S. Decennial Census; 1850–1870 1880-1890; 1900 1910 1920; 1930 1940 1950; 1960 1970 1980; 1990 2000 2010

Poso Park first appeared as a census designated place in the 2010 U.S. census.

The 2020 United States census reported that Poso Park had a population of 9, all Non-Hispanic White. The median age was 72.3 years. There were 39 housing units, of which 6 were occupied year round.

== Education ==
Poso Park is served by the Linns Valley-Poso Flat Union School District and the Porterville Unified School District for grades 9-12.
