= Tonyville, California =

Tonyville
- Census Designated Place
- Location in Tulare County and the state of California

- Position in California.
- Coordinates: 36°14′51″N 119°05′25″W
- Country: United States
- State: California
- County: Tulare

Area
  - Total: 0.051 sq mi (0.131 km^{2})
  - Land: 0.051 sq mi (0.131 km^{2})
  - Water: 0 sq mi (0 km^{2}) 0%
- Elevation: 361 ft (110 m)

Population (2020)
  - Total: 329
  - Density: 6,500/sq mi (2,510/km^{2})
- Time zone: UTC-8 (Pacific (PST))
  - Summer (DST): UTC-7 (PDT)
- GNIS feature ID: 2585461

Tonyville is a census-designated place (CDP) in Tulare County, California, United States. Tonyville sits at an elevation of 361 feet (110 m). The 2020 United States census reported Tonyville's population was 329.

== Geography ==
According to the United States Census Bureau, the CDP covers an area of 0.05 square mile (0.13 km^{2}), all land.

It is located north of Lindsay.

== Demographics ==
Historical population
Census	Pop.	Note	%±
2010	316		—
2020	329		4.1%
U.S. Decennial Census; 1850–1870 1880-1890; 1900 1910 1920; 1930 1940 1950; 1960 1970 1980; 1990 2000 2010

Tonyville first appeared as a census designated place in the 2010 U.S. census.

The 2020 United States census reported that Tonyville had a population of 329. The population density was 6,580.0 inhabitants per square mile (2,540.6/km^{2}). The racial makeup of Tonyville was 51 (15.5%) White, 0 (0.0%) African American, 4 (1.2%) Native American, 2 (0.6%) Asian, 0 (0.0%) Pacific Islander, 232 (70.5%) from other races, and 40 (12.2%) from two or more races. Hispanic or Latino of any race were 321 persons (97.6%).

The whole population lived in households. There were 74 households, out of which 45 (60.8%) had children under the age of 18 living in them, 47 (63.5%) were married-couple households, 3 (4.1%) were cohabiting couple households, 13 (17.6%) had a female householder with no partner present, and 11 (14.9%) had a male householder with no partner present. 4 households (5.4%) were one person, and 1 (1.4%) were one person aged 65 or older. The average household size was 4.45. There were 67 families (90.5% of all households).

The age distribution was 123 people (37.4%) under the age of 18, 25 people (7.6%) aged 18 to 24, 81 people (24.6%) aged 25 to 44, 61 people (18.5%) aged 45 to 64, and 39 people (11.9%) who were 65 years of age or older. The median age was 28.9 years. For every 100 females, there were 115.0 males.

There were 77 housing units at an average density of 1,540.0 units per square mile (594.6 units/km^{2}), of which 74 (96.1%) were occupied. Of these, 21 (28.4%) were owner-occupied, and 53 (71.6%) were occupied by renters.

== Education ==
Tonyville is served by the Lindsay Unified School District.
