= West Goshen, California =

West Goshen
- census-designated place
- Location in Tulare County and the state of California

- Position in California.
- Coordinates: 36°20′57″N 119°27′27″W
- Country: United States
- State: California
- County: Tulare

Area
  - Total: 0.670 sq mi (1.735 km^{2})
  - Land: 0.670 sq mi (1.735 km^{2})
  - Water: 0 sq mi (0 km^{2}) 0%
- Elevation: 272 ft (83 m)

Population (2020)
  - Total: 536
  - Density: 800/sq mi (309/km^{2})
- Time zone: UTC-8 (Pacific (PST))
  - Summer (DST): UTC-7 (PDT)
- ZIP code: 93291
- Area code: 559
- GNIS feature ID: 2627938

West Goshen is a census-designated place (CDP) in Tulare County, California, United States. West Goshen sits at an elevation of 272 feet (83 m). The 2020 United States census reported West Goshen's population was 536.

== Geography ==
According to the United States Census Bureau, the CDP covers an area of 0.7 square mile (1.7 km^{2}), all land.

== Demographics ==
Historical population
Census	Pop.	Note	%±
2010	511		—
2020	536		4.9%
U.S. Decennial Census; 1850–1870 1880-1890; 1900 1910 1920; 1930 1940 1950; 1960 1970 1980; 1990 2000 2010

West Goshen first appeared as a census designated place in the 2010 U.S. census.

The 2020 United States census reported that West Goshen had a population of 536. The population density was 800.0 inhabitants per square mile (308.9/km^{2}). The racial makeup of West Goshen was 183 (34.1%) White, 0 (0.0%) African American, 2 (0.4%) Native American, 1 (0.2%) Asian, 0 (0.0%) Pacific Islander, 220 (41.0%) from other races, and 130 (24.3%) from two or more races. Hispanic or Latino of any race were 416 persons (77.6%).

The whole population lived in households. There were 145 households, out of which 73 (50.3%) had children under the age of 18 living in them, 84 (57.9%) were married-couple households, 16 (11.0%) were cohabiting couple households, 24 (16.6%) had a female householder with no partner present, and 21 (14.5%) had a male householder with no partner present. 12 households (8.3%) were one person, and 9 (6.2%) were one person aged 65 or older. The average household size was 3.7. There were 124 families (85.5% of all households).

The age distribution was 165 people (30.8%) under the age of 18, 52 people (9.7%) aged 18 to 24, 149 people (27.8%) aged 25 to 44, 123 people (22.9%) aged 45 to 64, and 47 people (8.8%) who were 65 years of age or older. The median age was 29.4 years. For every 100 females, there were 134.1 males.

There were 149 housing units at an average density of 222.4 units per square mile (85.9 units/km^{2}), of which 145 (97.3%) were occupied. Of these, 55 (37.9%) were owner-occupied, and 90 (62.1%) were occupied by renters.

== Education ==
West Goshen is served by the Visalia Unified School District.
