= Patterson Tract, California =

Patterson Tract
- census-designated place
- Location in Tulare County and the state of California

- Position in California.
- Coordinates: 36°22′46″N 119°17′44″W
- Country: United States
- State: California
- County: Tulare

Area
  - Total: 1.446 sq mi (3.745 km^{2})
  - Land: 1.446 sq mi (3.745 km^{2})
  - Water: 0 sq mi (0 km^{2}) 0%
- Elevation: 328 ft (100 m)

Population (2020)
  - Total: 1,888
  - Density: 1,306/sq mi (504.1/km^{2})
- Time zone: UTC-8 (Pacific (PST))
  - Summer (DST): UTC-7 (PDT)
- GNIS feature ID: 2585436

Patterson Tract is a census-designated place (CDP) in Tulare County, California, United States. Patterson Tract sits at an elevation of 328 feet (100 m). The 2020 United States census reported Patterson Tract's population was 1,888.

== Geography ==
According to the United States Census Bureau, the CDP covers an area of 1.4 square miles (3.7 km^{2}), all land.

== Demographics ==
Historical population
Census	Pop.	Note	%±
2010	1,752		—
2020	1,888		7.8%
U.S. Decennial Census; 1860–1870 1880-1890; 1900 1910 1920; 1930 1940 1950; 1960 1970 1980; 1990 2000 2010

Patterson Tract first appeared as a census designated place in the 2010 U.S. census.

=== 2020 census ===
As of the 2020 census, Patterson Tract had a population of 1,888 and a population density of 1,305.7 inhabitants per square mile (504.1/km^{2}).

The census reported that 1,882 people (99.7% of the population) lived in households, 6 (0.3%) lived in non-institutionalized group quarters, and no one was institutionalized. 97.2% of residents lived in urban areas, while 2.8% lived in rural areas.

The age distribution was 585 people (31.0%) under the age of 18, 188 people (10.0%) aged 18 to 24, 452 people (23.9%) aged 25 to 44, 413 people (21.9%) aged 45 to 64, and 250 people (13.2%) who were 65 years of age or older. The median age was 32.2 years. For every 100 females, there were 95.4 males, and for every 100 females age 18 and over, there were 95.9 males age 18 and over.

There were 538 households, out of which 235 (43.7%) had children under the age of 18 living in them. Of all households, 287 (53.3%) were married-couple households, 44 (8.2%) were cohabiting couple households, 106 (19.7%) had a male householder with no spouse or partner present, and 101 (18.8%) had a female householder with no spouse or partner present. About 86 households (16.0%) were made up of individuals, and 35 (6.5%) had someone living alone who was 65 years of age or older. The average household size was 3.5, and there were 428 families (79.6% of all households).

There were 568 housing units at an average density of 392.8 units per square mile (151.7 units/km^{2}), of which 538 (94.7%) were occupied and 30 (5.3%) were vacant. Of the occupied units, 335 (62.3%) were owner-occupied and 203 (37.7%) were occupied by renters. The homeowner vacancy rate was 0.0% and the rental vacancy rate was 1.9%.

Racial composition as of the 2020 census
Race	Number	Percent
White	711	37.7%
Black or African American	8	0.4%
American Indian and Alaska Native	21	1.1%
Asian	99	5.2%
Native Hawaiian and Other Pacific Islander	0	0.0%
Some other race	813	43.1%
Two or more races	236	12.5%
Hispanic or Latino (of any race)	1,301	68.9%

== Education ==
The CDP is served by the Visalia Unified School District.
