= East Tulare Villa, California =

East Tulare Villa
- census-designated place
- Location of East Tulare Villa in Tulare County, California.

- Position in California.
- Coordinates: 36°12′13″N 119°16′56″W
- Country: United States
- State: California
- County: Tulare

Area
  - Total: 0.282 sq mi (0.731 km^{2})
  - Land: 0.282 sq mi (0.731 km^{2})
  - Water: 0 sq mi (0 km^{2}) 0%
- Elevation: 302 ft (92 m)

Population (2020)
  - Total: 773
  - Density: 2,740/sq mi (1,060/km^{2})
- Time zone: UTC-8 (Pacific (PST))
  - Summer (DST): UTC-7 (PDT)
- ZIP code: 93274
- Area code: 559
- GNIS feature ID: 2585408

East Tulare Villa is a census-designated place (CDP) in Tulare County, California, United States. East Tulare Villa sits at an elevation of 302 feet (92 m). The 2020 United States census reported East Tulare Villa's population as 773.

== Geography ==
According to the United States Census Bureau, the CDP covers an area of 0.3 square mile (0.7 km^{2}), all land.

== Demographics ==
Historical population
Census	Pop.	Note	%±
2010	778		—
2020	773		−0.6%
U.S. Decennial Census; 1850–1870 1880-1890; 1900 1910 1920; 1930 1940 1950; 1960 1970 1980; 1990 2000 2010

East Tulare Village first appeared as a census designated place in the 2010 U.S. census.

The 2020 United States census reported that East Tulare Villa had a population of 773. The population density was 2,741.1 inhabitants per square mile (1,058.3/km^{2}). The racial makeup of East Tulare Villa was 303 (39.2%) White, 0 (0.0%) African American, 28 (3.6%) Native American, 9 (1.2%) Asian, 1 (0.1%) Pacific Islander, 294 (38.0%) from other races, and 138 (17.9%) from two or more races. Hispanic or Latino of any race were 491 persons (63.5%).

The whole population lived in households. There were 214 households, out of which 120 (56.1%) had children under the age of 18 living in them, 128 (59.8%) were married-couple households, 12 (5.6%) were cohabiting couple households, 43 (20.1%) had a female householder with no partner present, and 31 (14.5%) had a male householder with no partner present. 18 households (8.4%) were one person, and 9 (4.2%) were one person aged 65 or older. The average household size was 3.61. There were 192 families (89.7% of all households).

The age distribution was 246 people (31.8%) under the age of 18, 76 people (9.8%) aged 18 to 24, 201 people (26.0%) aged 25 to 44, 152 people (19.7%) aged 45 to 64, and 98 people (12.7%) who were 65 years of age or older. The median age was 30.6 years. For every 100 females, there were 102.4 males.

There were 222 housing units at an average density of 787.2 units per square mile (303.9 units/km^{2}), of which 214 (96.4%) were occupied. Of these, 131 (61.2%) were owner-occupied, and 83 (38.8%) were occupied by renters.

== Education ==
The CDP is served by the Sundale Union Elementary School District and by the Tulare Joint Union High School District.
