= Teviston, California =

Teviston
- census-designated place
- Location in Tulare County and the state of California

- Position in California.
- Coordinates: 35°55′44″N 119°16′42″W
- Country: United States
- State: California
- County: Tulare

Area
  - Total: 2.185 sq mi (5.658 km^{2})
  - Land: 2.185 sq mi (5.658 km^{2})
  - Water: 0 sq mi (0 km^{2}) 0%
- Elevation: 272 ft (83 m)

Population (2020)
  - Total: 1,185
  - Density: 542.4/sq mi (209.4/km^{2})
- Time zone: UTC-8 (Pacific (PST))
  - Summer (DST): UTC-7 (PDT)
- GNIS feature ID: 2585460

Teviston is a census-designated place (CDP) in Tulare County, California, United States. It is approximately three miles south of Pixley on Highway 99 between Fresno and Bakersfield. Teviston sits at an elevation of 272 feet (83 m). The 2020 United States census reported Teviston's population was 1,185.

== Geography ==
According to the United States Census Bureau, the CDP covers an area of 2.2 square miles (5.7 km^{2}), all land.

== Demographics ==
Historical population
Census	Pop.	Note	%±
2010	1,214		—
2020	1,185		−2.4%
U.S. Decennial Census; 1850–1870 1880-1890; 1900 1910 1920; 1930 1940 1950; 1960 1970 1980; 1990 2000 2010

=== 2020 census ===
As of the 2020 census, Teviston had a population of 1,185, all of whom lived in households. The population density was 542.6 inhabitants per square mile (209.5/km^{2}). The age distribution was 429 people (36.2%) under the age of 18, 129 people (10.9%) aged 18 to 24, 291 people (24.6%) aged 25 to 44, 237 people (20.0%) aged 45 to 64, and 99 people (8.4%) who were 65 years of age or older. The median age was 27.4 years. For every 100 females, there were 105.7 males, and for every 100 females age 18 and over, there were 107.1 males age 18 and over.

0.0% of residents lived in urban areas, while 100.0% lived in rural areas.

There were 288 households, out of which 161 (55.9%) had children under the age of 18 living in them; 144 (50.0%) were married-couple households; 18 (6.3%) were cohabiting couple households; 56 (19.4%) had a female householder with no spouse or partner present; and 70 (24.3%) had a male householder with no spouse or partner present. There were 49 one-person households (17.0%), including 22 households (7.6%) with a person aged 65 or older living alone. The average household size was 4.11, and there were 229 families (79.5% of all households).

There were 316 housing units at an average density of 144.7 units per square mile (55.9 units/km^{2}). Of these, 288 (91.1%) were occupied and 28 (8.9%) were vacant. Of occupied units, 99 (34.4%) were owner-occupied and 189 (65.6%) were occupied by renters. The homeowner vacancy rate was 2.8%, and the rental vacancy rate was 2.1%.

Racial composition as of the 2020 census
Race	Number	Percent
White	143	12.1%
Black or African American	39	3.3%
American Indian and Alaska Native	9	0.8%
Asian	3	0.3%
Native Hawaiian and Other Pacific Islander	0	0.0%
Some other race	761	64.2%
Two or more races	230	19.4%
Hispanic or Latino (of any race)	1,079	91.1%

=== 2010 census ===
Teviston first appeared as a census designated place in the 2010 U.S. census.

== Events ==
In June 2021 the Teviston drinking water pump broke leaving the town without potable water during California's worst drought on record.

== Education ==
Most of the CDP is in the Earlimart Elementary School District and the Delano Joint Union High School District. Some northern blocks in are the Tipton Elementary School District and the Tulare Joint Union High School District.
