= California county routes in zone J =

List of thoroughfares in the US state

- Example of a California county route shield

Highway names
- County: County Route X (CR X) or Route X

System links
- County routes in California

There are 45 routes assigned to the "J" zone of the California Route Marker Program, which designates county routes in California. The "J" zone includes county highways in Alameda, Calaveras, Contra Costa, Fresno, Kern, Inyo, Mariposa, Merced, Sacramento, San Benito, San Joaquin, Stanislaus, Tulare, and Tuolumne counties.

== J1 ==
County Road J1
- Location: Fresno and San Benito counties
- Length: 70.48 mi (113.43 km)
- Existed: 1958–present

County Route J1 (CR J1) is a county highway in San Benito and Fresno counties in the U.S. state of California. It runs from State Route 25 in Paicines to State Route 33 in Mendota. The route is known as Panoche Road, Little Panoche Road, Shields Avenue, Fairfax Avenue, and Belmont Avenue.

The route begins in Paicines in San Benito County at State Route 25. Between Paicines and Panoche Valley, CR J1 is known as Panoche Road. Its north–south portion between Panoche Valley and Fresno County is called Little Panoche Road. In Fresno County, the route then intersects with Interstate 5 and terminates in Mendota at State Route 33 near State Route 180 in the Central Valley. East of Interstate 5, the alignment of CR J1 follows Fresno County's West Shields Avenue (which is exit 379 off of Interstate 5). Shields Avenue ends at North Fairfax Avenue. CR J1 continues south 2 miles (3.2 km) on Fairfax Avenue to West Belmont Avenue, where CR J1 proceeds east on Belmont Avenue until its end at SR 33 in Mendota. Belmont Avenue continues east without the county route designation to SR 180.

Panoche Road lies within the corridor of an unbuilt Route 180 segment. No current plan exists to extend Route 180 westward from Mendota past Interstate 5 and into San Benito County.

Parts of J1 east of CA-25 to Little Panoche Rd have large potholes.

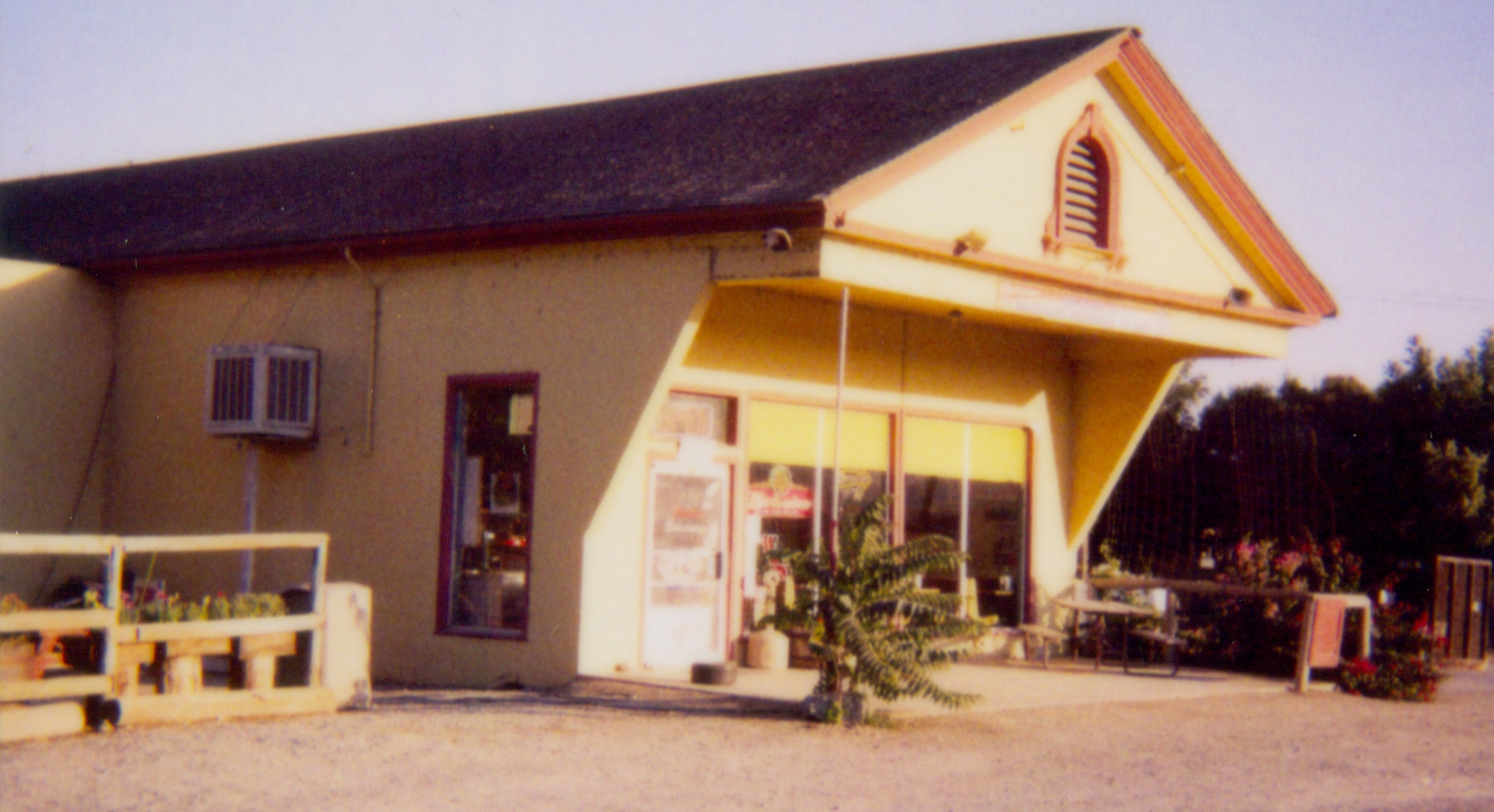
Paicines General Store

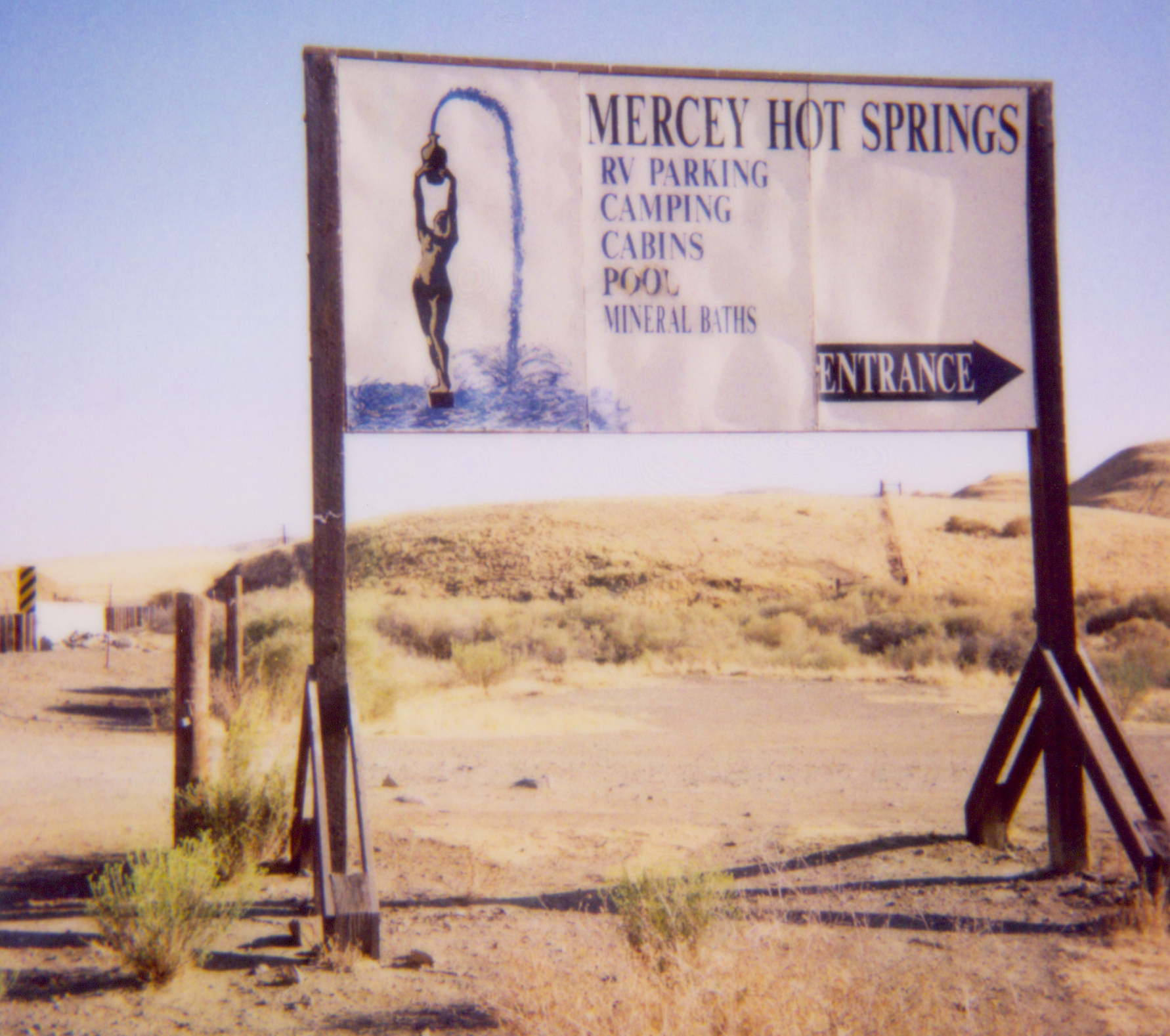
Mercey Hot Springs Resort sign

Major intersections

County	Location	mi	km	Destinations	Notes
San Benito	Paicines			SR 25 – Pinnacles, Hollister	Western terminus
San Benito	Panoche			Panoche Road – New Idria	East end of Panoche Road on CR J1; west end of Little Panoche Road
Fresno				I-5 (West Side Freeway)	Interchange; I-5 exit 379; east end of Little Panoche Road; west end of Shields Avenue
Fresno				Fairfax Avenue north – Firebaugh	East end of Shields Avenue on CR J1; west end of Fairfax Avenue on CR J1
Fresno				Fairfax Avenue south	East end of Fairfax Avenue on CR J1; west end of Belmont Avenue on CR J1
Fresno	Mendota			SR 33 (Derrick Avenue)	Eastern terminus; road continues east as Belmont Avenue to SR 180
1.000 mi = 1.609 km; 1.000 km = 0.621 mi

== J2 ==
County Road J2
- Location: Alameda and San Joaquin counties
- Length: 39.22 mi (63.12 km)
- Existed: 1960–present

County Route J2 (CR J2), or I-580 Alternate, is a county highway that is made up of a series of streets and roads in Alameda and San Joaquin counties in the U.S. state of California. It runs from the Portola Avenue overpass at Interstate 580 in Livermore to State Route 4 near the community of Holt. The route is known as portions of Portola Avenue and Livermore Avenue, Tesla Road, Corral Hollow Road, and portions of Lammers Road and Tracy Boulevard.

Route description

County Route J2 begins at the Portola Avenue overcrossing of Interstate 580 in Livermore. It was a former partial interchange that closed permanently in 2011 due to the interchange that opened with Isabel Avenue (State Route 84) west of Portola. The route follows Portola to Livermore Avenue, where CR J2 turns southward to pass through Livermore's downtown. The highway continues past the southeast edge of Livermore to become Tesla Road and rise into the Diablo Range, which separates the outer San Francisco Bay Area from the San Joaquin Valley.

At the Alameda-San Joaquin county line, CR J2 becomes Corral Hollow Road and enters the narrow valley of the same name. Upon approaching the San Joaquin Valley, the road turns northward, meeting Interstate 580 again and arriving at the southern subdivisions of Tracy. After passing through this city, the road passes under Interstate 205 (with no access), shifts briefly onto Lammers Road, and soon turns northward onto Tracy Boulevard. CR J2 then crosses the sea-level Union and Roberts Islands in the San Joaquin-Sacramento River Delta before terminating at State Route 4.

Major intersections

County	Location	mi	km	Destinations	Notes
Alameda	Livermore			Overpass over I-580; no access	Western terminus; former westbound exit and eastbound entrance interchange; former I-580 east exit 52B; road continues as Portola Avenue
Alameda	Livermore			North Livermore Avenue north, Portola Avenue east	East end of Portola Avenue on CR J2; west end of North Livermore Avenue on CR J2
Alameda	Livermore			Railroad Avenue	East end of North Livermore Avenue; west end of South Livermore Avenue
Alameda	Livermore			First Street	Former SR 84
Alameda				East end of South Livermore Avenue; west end of Tesla Road	
Alameda				Mines Road	to Del Valle Regional Park and San Antonio Valley
Alameda				South Vasco Road	
Alameda				Cross Road	Juan Bautista de Anza National Historic Trail
Alameda–San Joaquin county line	Carnegie			East end of Tesla Road; west end of Corral Hollow Road	
San Joaquin				I-580	Interchange; I-580 exit 72; cardinal direction change: east to north; south to west
San Joaquin	Tracy			Eleventh Street (I-205 BL)	Former US 50
San Joaquin	Tracy			Grant Line Road (CR J4)	
San Joaquin				Lammers Road west	North end of Corral Hollow Road; south end of Lammers Road
San Joaquin				CR J13 (Tracy Boulevard south)	Northern terminus of CR J13; north end of Lammers Road; south end of Tracy Boulevard on CR J2
San Joaquin				SR 4 – Brentwood, Holt, Stockton	Northern terminus
1.000 mi = 1.609 km; 1.000 km = 0.621 mi: Closed/former

== J3 ==
County Road J3
- Location: San Joaquin and Stanislaus counties
- Length: 35.37 mi (56.92 km)
- Existed: 1960–present

County Route J3 (CR J3) is a county highway that runs 35 miles (56 km) north-south through Stanislaus and San Joaquin counties in the U.S. state of California. It runs from State Route 132 east of Vernalis to State Route 12 (Kettleman Lane) in Lodi. The route is known as Kasson Road, Airport Way, West Lane, and Hutchins Street.

Route description

The route begins 2 miles (3.2 km) east of Vernalis as Kasson Road, running northward from the road's intersection with State Route 132. After almost 3 miles (4.8 km) the route meets Airport Way and follows it northward 21 miles (34 km) past Manteca, Lathrop, and French Camp into Stockton. CR J3 then follows West Lane 10 miles (16 km) out from Stockton and becomes Hutchins Street for the route's last 1 mile (1.6 km). The route reaches its northern end at State Route 12 in Lodi.

The highway is also known as Stanislaus County Route J3 and San Joaquin County Route J3, though all but 1 mile (1.6 km) of the route is within San Joaquin County.

Major intersections

County	Location	mi	km	Destinations	Notes
Stanislaus				SR 132 (Maze Boulevard) – Patterson, Modesto	Southern terminus; road continues south as River Road
San Joaquin				CR J4 (Durham Ferry Road)	Southern terminus of CR J4; north end of Kasson Road on CR J3; south end of Airport Way
San Joaquin	Manteca			SR 120 – Sonora, San Francisco	Interchange; SR 120 exit 3
San Joaquin	Manteca			Yosemite Avenue	Former SR 120
San Joaquin				Lathrop Road	
San Joaquin				Roth Road	
San Joaquin				French Camp Road (CR J9) to I-5 / SR 99	
San Joaquin	Stockton			Dr. Martin Luther King Jr. Boulevard (SR 4 Bus.)	Former US 50 / SR 4 / Charter Way
San Joaquin	Stockton			Harding Way	North end of Airport Way; south end of West Lane
San Joaquin	Stockton			March Lane	
San Joaquin	Stockton			Hammer Lane (CR J8)	
San Joaquin				Eight Mile Road	
San Joaquin	Lodi			Harney Lane	North end of West Lane; south end of Hutchins Street
San Joaquin	Lodi			SR 12 (Kettleman Lane)	Northern terminus; road continues north as Hutchins Street
1.000 mi = 1.609 km; 1.000 km = 0.621 mi

== J4 ==
County Road J4
- Location: Alameda, Contra Costa, and San Joaquin counties
- Length: 27.99 mi (45.05 km)
- Existed: 1960–present

County Route J4 (CR J4) is a county highway in the U.S. state of California that runs 28 miles (45 km) nominally north–south across portions of San Joaquin, Alameda, and Contra Costa counties that are growing in population and suburbanization. The route connects the suburbs of the far outer East Bay and the Sacramento River Delta with the northern San Joaquin Valley, running from Airport Way and Kasson Road (County Route J3) to State Route 4 near Discovery Bay. It is known as Durham Ferry Road, Kasson Road, Grant Line Road, Byron Road, Byron Bethany Highway, and Byron Highway.

The route begins 9 miles (14 km) southeast of Tracy at Airport Way and Kasson Road (County Route J3), passes through Tracy and Byron, and terminates at State Route 4 between Discovery Bay and Brentwood.

The portion between Tracy and Brentwood lies along the unconstructed corridor of State Route 239. SAFETEA-LU, federal legislation enacted in 2005, authorized $14 million in federal appropriations toward construction of the route.

Major intersections

County	Location	mi	km	Destinations	Notes
San Joaquin				CR J3 (Airport Way, Kasson Road)	Southern terminus
San Joaquin				Durham Ferry Road	North end of Durham Ferry Road on CR J4; south end of Kasson Road on CR J4
San Joaquin				I-5	Interchange; I-5 exit 457
San Joaquin				Eleventh Street (I-205 BL) to I-5 north	Roundabout; former US 50; north end of Kasson Road; south end of Grant Line Road
San Joaquin	Tracy			Tracy Boulevard (CR J13)	
San Joaquin	Tracy			Corral Hollow Road (CR J2)	
San Joaquin	Tracy			I-205 – Stockton, San Francisco	Interchange; I-205 exit 6
San Joaquin				Byron Road south	North end of Grant Line Road on CR J4; south end of Byron Road on CR J4
San Joaquin				Grant Line Road west	Roundabout
San Joaquin	Mountain House			Mountain House Parkway	
San Joaquin–Alameda county line				North end of Byron Road; south end of Byron Bethany Road	
Alameda–Contra Costa county line				North end of Byron Bethany Road; south end of Byron Highway	
Contra Costa				SR 4 (Byron Highway) – Stockton, Antioch	Northern terminus
1.000 mi = 1.609 km; 1.000 km = 0.621 mi

== J5 ==
County Road J5
- Location: San Joaquin County
- Length: 30.45 mi (49.00 km)
- Existed: 1960–present

County Route J5 (CR J5) is a county highway in San Joaquin County, California, United States. It runs for about 30 miles (49 km), from State Route 99 in Ripon to Peltier Road (County Route J12) north of Lockeford. It is known as Jack Tone Road and Elliot Road.

Route description

County Route J5 begins at State Route 99's interchange with Jack Tone Road in Ripon. Following Jack Tone Road, CR J5 passes through SR 120 east of Manteca and State Routes 4 and 26 east of Stockton. Eventually, it curves northwest where it is then co-routed with State Routes 12 and 88 at a right turn in Lockeford for a short distance before leaving SR 12 / SR 88 at a left turn at Elliot Road. It eventually leads to Peltier Road (CR J12), where CR J5 ends.

Major intersections

The entire route is in San Joaquin County.

Location	mi	km	Destinations	Notes
Ripon			SR 99 – Sacramento, Fresno	Interchange; SR 99 north exit 237B, south exit 237; southern terminus; road continues south as Jack Tone Road
			SR 120 (Yosemite Avenue) – Escalon, Manteca	
			CR J9 (French Camp Road) / Lone Tree Road	
			CR J7 (Mariposa Road) – Escalon, Stockton	
			SR 4 – Farmington, Stockton	
			Copperopolis Road	
			SR 26 – Linden, Stockton	
			Eight Mile Road	
			Jack Tone Road	North end of Jack Tone Road on CR J5; south end of Jack Tone Bypass
Lockeford			SR 12 / SR 88 west	South end of SR 12 / SR 88 overlap; north end of Jack Tone Bypass
Lockeford			SR 12 / SR 88 east (Main Street) / Tully Road	North end of SR 12 / SR 88 overlap; south end of Elliot Road on CR J5
			CR J12 (Peltier Road)	Northern terminus; road continues north as Elliot Road
1.000 mi = 1.609 km; 1.000 km = 0.621 mi: Concurrency terminus

== J6 ==
County Road J6
- Location: San Joaquin – Stanislaus Counties
- Length: 22.27 mi (35.84 km)
- Existed: 1960–present

County Road J6 (CR J6) is a county highway in Stanislaus and San Joaquin counties in the U.S. state of California. It runs from State Route 108 near Del Rio to State Route 26 in Bellota. The route is known as McHenry Avenue, Escalon Avenue in Escalon, and Escalon-Bellota Road.

Route description

County Route J6 begins at the junction with State Route 108 near Del Rio. It continues north as McHenry Avenue to the junction with State Route 120 in Escalon. Continuing north as Escalon Avenue, it becomes Escalon-Bellota Road as it leaves Escalon, eventually crossing State Route 4 in Farmington and ending at its northern terminus at State Route 26 in Bellota, 4 miles east of Linden.

Major intersections

County	Location	mi	km	Destinations	Notes
Stanislaus				SR 108 west (McHenry Avenue)	Southern terminus; no left turn onto SR 108 east
Stanislaus				Patterson Road, Ladd Road to SR 108 east	
San Joaquin				East River Road	
San Joaquin	Escalon			SR 120 / CR J7 south (Yosemite Avenue, California Street) – Oakdale, Yosemite	South end of CR J7 overlap and Escalon Avenue; north end of McHenry Avenue
San Joaquin				North end of Escalon Avenue; south end of Escalon-Bellota Road	
San Joaquin				CR J7 north (Mariposa Road)	North end of CR J7 overlap
San Joaquin	Farmington			SR 4	
San Joaquin				SR 26 – Valley Springs, Linden	Northern terminus
1.000 mi = 1.609 km; 1.000 km = 0.621 mi: Concurrency terminus; Incomplete access

== J7 ==
County Road J7
- Location: Merced – San Joaquin – Stanislaus Counties
- Length: 58.91 mi (94.81 km)
- Existed: 1960–present

County Route J7 (CR J7) is a county highway in Merced, Stanislaus and San Joaquin counties in the U.S. state of California. It mostly parallels State Route 99 to the east and generally follows the BNSF Railway between Merced and Stockton. It also connects several smaller communities including Atwater, Winton, Cressey, Ballico, Denair, Hughson, Empire, Riverbank, and Escalon. CR J7 runs from State Route 59 and West Olive Avenue in Merced to SR 99 in Stockton. The route is known as Santa Fe Drive, Santa Fe Avenue, Claus Road, First Street in Riverbank, Santa Fe Road, Main Street and Escalon Avenue in Escalon, Escalon-Bellota Road, and Mariposa Road.

Route description

The southern terminus for CR J7 is at State Route 59 in Merced, locally known as the Snelling Highway. The route is locally signed as Santa Fe Drive. From this point, it travels northwest for 12 mi through Merced County, passing by the former site of Castle Air Force Base in Atwater. Upon crossing the Merced River, the route continues in Stanislaus County as Santa Fe Avenue for another 20 mi until it reaches the community of Empire. In Empire, the route briefly co-signs with SR 132 (locally signed as Yosemite Boulevard) for just over 1 mi before turning onto Claus Road, where it skirts the eastern edge of Modesto. The route follows Claus Road for approximately 6.5 mi, passing the former site of the Riverbank Army Ammunition Plant as well as the Rainbow Fields sports park.

CR J7 then follows SR 108 (locally signed as Atchison Street) westward in Riverbank for approximately 0.9 mi before turning onto First Street and continuing on a north-south trajectory. Once it crosses the Stanislaus River and enters San Joaquin County, the route is locally signed as Santa Fe Road. At this point, it continues its parallel path with the BNSF rail line. About 4.3 mi after entering San Joaquin County, the route then enters Escalon and becomes Main Street for 0.7 mi before reaching SR 120. CR J7 very briefly co-signs with SR 120 before intersecting with CR J6. The two county routes share the same roadway (locally signed as Escalon Avenue, then Escalon-Bellota Road) for 2.5 mi before CR J7 follows a curve onto Mariposa Road on a northwest-southeast trajectory.

At this point, CR J7 continues on Mariposa Road, a mostly rural road. While on Mariposa Road, CR J7 passes just north of the BNSF Stockton Intermodal Yard. The county route eventually meets its northern terminus with SR 99 in eastern Stockton.

Major intersections

County	Location	mi	km	Destinations	Notes
Merced	Merced			SR 59 (Snelling Highway) – Downtown Merced	Southern terminus; serves UC Merced; road continues as West Olive Avenue
Merced	Winton			Winton Way	
Merced				El Capitan Way – Delhi, Montpelier	
Merced–Stanislaus county line				North end of Santa Fe Drive; south end of Santa Fe Avenue	
Stanislaus				East Avenue (CR J17) – Turlock	
Stanislaus	Denair			Main Street – Turlock	
Stanislaus				Geer Road (CR J14) – Oakdale	
Stanislaus	Hughson			Whitmore Avenue – Ceres	
Stanislaus				Hatch Road	
Stanislaus	Empire			SR 132 east (Yosemite Boulevard) – Waterford	South end of SR 132 overlap; north end of Santa Fe Avenue
Stanislaus	Modesto			SR 132 west (Yosemite Boulevard) / Garner Road	North end of SR 132 overlap; south end of Claus Road
Stanislaus	Modesto			Briggsmore Avenue	
Stanislaus	Riverbank			Claribel Road	
Stanislaus				SR 108 east – Oakdale	South end of SR 108 overlap; north end of Claus Road
Stanislaus	Riverbank			SR 108 west (Atchison Street) / First Street	North end of SR 108 overlap; south end of First Street on CR J7
Stanislaus–San Joaquin county line				North end of First Street; south end of Santa Fe Road	
San Joaquin	Escalon			North end of Santa Fe Road; south end of Main Street	
San Joaquin	Escalon			SR 120 east (California Street) / Kern Street – Oakdale, Yosemite	South end of SR 120 overlap; north end of Main Street
San Joaquin	Escalon			SR 120 west (Yosemite Avenue) / CR J6 south (McHenry Avenue) – Manteca, San Francisco, Modesto	North end of SR 120 overlap; south end of CR J6 overlap and Escalon Avenue
San Joaquin				North end of Escalon Avenue; south end of Escalon-Bellota Road	
San Joaquin				CR J6 north (Escalon-Bellota Road)	North end of CR J6 overlap and Escalon-Bellota Road on CR J7; south end of Mariposa Road
San Joaquin				CR J5 (South Jack Tone Road) – Lockeford, Ripon	
San Joaquin	Stockton			SR 99 – Sacramento, Fresno	Interchange; northern terminus; SR 99 exit 252A
San Joaquin	Stockton			Mariposa Road (SR 99 Bus. north / SR 4 Bus. west)	Continuation beyond SR 99; former US 99 north
1.000 mi = 1.609 km; 1.000 km = 0.621 mi: Concurrency terminus

== J8 ==
County Road J8
- Location: Sacramento and San Joaquin counties
- Length: 43.81 mi (70.51 km)
- Existed: 1960–present

County Route J8 (CR J8) is a county highway in San Joaquin and Sacramento counties in the U.S. state of California. It mostly parallels Interstate 5 to the east and generally follows the Union Pacific Railroad between Stockton and Sacramento. CR J8 runs from State Route 99 at Hammer Lane in Stockton to SR 99 at Broadway in Sacramento. The route is known as Hammer Lane in Stockton, Thornton Road, Franklin Boulevard, and a tiny portion of Broadway in Sacramento.

Route description

County Route J8 starts at the interchange of Hammer Lane and State Route 99 in Stockton. The route proceeds west on Hammer Lane to the intersection of Thornton Road, then turns northwest, following Thornton Road from Stockton to the Sacramento County line north of Thornton. North of Thornton, the route proceeds slightly away from I-5 until it parallels the Union Pacific Railroad and crosses the Cosumnes River into Sacramento County. From here the route is known as Franklin Boulevard and proceeds north to the town of Franklin. Northbound traffic must turn east onto Bilby Road to cross the railroad, then turn north on Willard Parkway to rejoin Franklin Boulevard south of its junction with Elk Grove Boulevard (CR E12). Southbound traffic follows the original alignment of Franklin Boulevard to cross the railroad tracks. The route continues north through Elk Grove and parts of the city of Sacramento before its junction with SR 99 at Broadway in Sacramento.

Major intersections

County	Location	mi	km	Destinations	Notes
San Joaquin				SR 99 – Fresno, Sacramento	Interchange; SR 99 exit 258; southern terminus; road continues as Frontage Road
San Joaquin	Stockton			West Lane (CR J3)	
San Joaquin	Stockton			Lower Sacramento Road (CR J10)	Southern terminus of CR J10
San Joaquin	Stockton			Hammer Lane west, Thornton Road south	North end of Hammer Lane on CR J8; south end of Thornton Road on CR J8
San Joaquin	Stockton			Eight Mile Road	
San Joaquin				SR 12 to I-5 – Rio Vista, Lodi	
San Joaquin				CR J12 (Peltier Road)	Western terminus of CR J12; connects to I-5
San Joaquin	Thornton			CR J11 (Walnut Grove Road)	Eastern terminus of CR J11; connects to I-5
San Joaquin–Sacramento county line				North end of Thornton Road; south end of Franklin Boulevard	
Sacramento				CR E13 (Twin Cities Road) to I-5 / SR 99 – Galt, Walnut Grove	
Sacramento	Franklin			Hood Franklin Road to I-5 – Hood, Sacramento	
Sacramento	Franklin			Bilby Road	Through traffic must turn right onto Bilby Road and turn left onto Willard Parkway to continue north on CR J8
Sacramento	Elk Grove			Whitelock Parkway, Willard Parkway	Northbound traffic is defaulted onto Willard Parkway south
Sacramento	Elk Grove			CR E12 (Elk Grove Boulevard) to I-5	Western terminus of CR E12
Sacramento	Elk Grove			Laguna Boulevard	Connects to I-5
Sacramento	Sacramento			Cosumnes River Boulevard	Serves Cosumnes River College, Franklin station
Sacramento	Sacramento			Mack Road	Serves Kaiser Permanente South Sacramento Medical Center, Meadowview station
Sacramento	Sacramento			Florin Road	Serves Florin station
Sacramento	Lemon Hill			47th Avenue	Serves 47th Avenue station
Sacramento	Sacramento			Fruitridge Road	Serves Fruitridge station
Sacramento	Sacramento			Broadway west	Former US 99W north; north end of Franklin Boulevard; south end of Broadway on CR J8
Sacramento	Sacramento			SR 99 south	Interchange; northern terminus; SR 99 north exit 298B; former US 99W south; road continues east as Broadway
1.000 mi = 1.609 km; 1.000 km = 0.621 mi: Incomplete access

== J9 ==
County Road J9
- Location: San Joaquin – Stanislaus Counties
- Length: 44.05 mi (70.89 km)
- Existed: 1960–present

County Route J9 (CR J9) is a county highway in Stanislaus and San Joaquin counties in the U.S. state of California. It is the main route between the cities of Turlock, Waterford, and Oakdale. It is especially busy during the morning and evening rush hours. The route is primarily rural, only traveling through a few cities, all with fewer than 20,000 people. CR J9 runs from East Avenue (County Route J17) east of Turlock to Interstate 5 in Stockton. The route is known as Hickman Road, F Street in Waterford, Oakdale-Waterford Highway, Albers Road, Yosemite Avenue in Oakdale, Valley Home Road, Lone Tree Road, and French Camp Road.

Route description

This road begins at Interstate 5 near Stockton. It then continues east through French Camp and south Stockton to SR 99. From here, the route is primarily rural. It then travels through Valley Home southbound. Next it crosses the Stanislaus River into Oakdale, passes the old Hershey's plant, and continues over the Hetch Hetchy Aqueduct. It then turns sharply left and becomes the Oakdale-Waterford Highway, through Waterford. Exiting Waterford, it crosses the Tuolumne River into Hickman and stays rural through to its terminus at J17.

Major intersections

County	Location	mi	km	Destinations	Notes
Stanislaus				East Avenue (CR J17) – Ballico, Turlock, Snelling	Southern terminus
Stanislaus				Monte Vista Avenue	
Stanislaus				Keyes Road	
Stanislaus				Whitmore Avenue – Hughson, Ceres	
Stanislaus	Waterford			SR 132 (Yosemite Boulevard)	CR J9 north transitions onto F Street
Stanislaus				CR J9 north transitions onto Oakdale-Waterford Highway	
Stanislaus				Claribel Road	
Stanislaus				Albers Road south (CR J14 south) / Patterson Road – Turlock, Patterson	South end of CR J14 overlap; CR J9 north transitions onto Albers Road north
Stanislaus	Oakdale			CR J9 north transitions onto South Yosemite Avenue	
Stanislaus	Oakdale			SR 108 / SR 120 east (East F Street) – Modesto, Sonora, Yosemite	South end of SR 120 overlap; CR J9 north transitions onto North Yosemite Avenue
Stanislaus				CR J14 north (Twenty-Six Mile Road) – Eugene, Milton, Woodward Reservoir	North end of CR J14 overlap
Stanislaus				SR 120 west / Frontage Road – Escalon	North end of SR 120 overlap; CR J9 north transitions onto Valley Home Road
Stanislaus	Valley Home			Valley Home Road north	CR J9 north transitions onto Lone Tree Road
San Joaquin				CR J6 / CR J7 (Escalon-Bellota Road)	
San Joaquin				CR J5 (Jack Tone Road) / French Camp Road south	CR J9 north transitions onto French Camp Road north
San Joaquin				Austin Road	
San Joaquin				SR 99 – Sacramento, Fresno, Los Angeles	Interchange; SR 99 exit 246; former US 99
San Joaquin				Union Road	
San Joaquin				Airport Way (CR J3)	Serves Stockton Metropolitan Airport
San Joaquin	French Camp			Ash Street	Lincoln Highway
San Joaquin				El Dorado Street	Former US 50
San Joaquin	Stockton			Arch Airport Road, Frank West Circle	
San Joaquin	Stockton			I-5 – Sacramento, Tracy, Los Angeles	Interchange; northern terminus; I-5 exit 468; road continues west as French Camp Road
1.000 mi = 1.609 km; 1.000 km = 0.621 mi: Concurrency terminus

== J10 ==
County Road J10
- Location: Sacramento – San Joaquin Counties
- Length: 17.63 mi (28.37 km)
- Existed: 1960–present

County Route J10 (CR J10) is a county highway in the U.S. state of California that connects the northern section of Stockton in San Joaquin County with the city of Galt in Sacramento County. A majority of the route is locally signed as Lower Sacramento Road, with Turner Road connecting the two segments of Lower Sacramento Road. In Galt, it is known as Lincoln Way. The route also connects through the city of Lodi, as well as the historic community of Woodbridge.

Route description

CR J10 begins at Hammer Lane (County Route J8) at its southern terminus. It then travels approximately 7 mi until it reaches the southern border of Lodi. From there, it continues another 2 mi to Turner Road. Briefly, Lower Sacramento Road is co-routed with Turner Road for 0.2 mi before again following a north-south route. The route continues on Lower Sacramento Road for another 10 mi before crossing into Sacramento County. At this point, the route becomes locally signed as South Lincoln Way. The route from this point travels another 4 mi, mostly through the city of Galt, before reaching its northern terminus at SR 99.

Major intersections

County	Location	mi	km	Destinations	Notes
San Joaquin	Stockton			Hammer Lane (CR J8)	Southern terminus; road continues south as Lower Sacramento Road to Pacific Avenue
San Joaquin	Stockton			Eight Mile Road	
San Joaquin				Armstrong Road	
San Joaquin	Lodi			Harney Lane	
San Joaquin	Lodi			SR 12 (Kettleman Lane) – Lodi, Rio Vista	
San Joaquin	Lodi			Lodi Avenue – Downtown Lodi	
San Joaquin	Lodi			Turner Road west, Woodhaven Lane	North end of Lower Sacramento Road (first segment); south end of Turner Road on CR J10
San Joaquin	Lodi			Turner Road east	North end of Turner Road on CR J10; south end of Lower Sacramento Road (second segment)
San Joaquin	Woodbridge			Woodbridge Road	
San Joaquin				Acampo Road – Acampo	
San Joaquin				CR J12 (Peltier Road)	
San Joaquin–Sacramento county line				North end of Lower Sacramento Road (second segment); south end of Lincoln Way	
Sacramento	Galt			C Street to SR 99	
Sacramento	Galt			A Street	
Sacramento	Galt			SR 99 – Sacramento	Interchange; northern terminus; SR 99 exit 275A; road continues north as Lincoln Way
1.000 mi = 1.609 km; 1.000 km = 0.621 mi

== J11 ==
County Road J11
- Location: Sacramento – San Joaquin Counties
- Length: 6.18 mi (9.95 km)
- Existed: 1960–present

County Route J11 (CR J11) is a county highway in Sacramento and San Joaquin counties in the U.S. state of California. The route connects State Route 160 in Walnut Grove with Thornton Road (County Route J8) in Thornton. It is known as River Road and Walnut Grove Thornton Road in Sacramento County and Walnut Grove Road in San Joaquin County.

Route description

County Route J11 begins at the junction of State Route 160 at the Walnut Grove Bridge in the town of Walnut Grove. At the eastern end of the bridge, it meets River Road (CR E13). The route proceeds south on River Road briefly along the levee of the Sacramento River and Georgiana Slough before leaving the levee and turning east onto Walnut Grove Thornton Road. The route crosses into San Joaquin County as Walnut Grove Road at the Mokelumne River and proceeds eastward to the interchange at Interstate 5 before it terminates at the junction of County Route J8 (Thornton Road) in the town of Thornton.

Major intersections

County	Location	mi	km	Destinations	Notes
Sacramento	Walnut Grove			SR 160 – Courtland, Sacramento, Isleton	Western terminus
Sacramento	Walnut Grove			Walnut Grove Bridge over the Sacramento River	
Sacramento	Walnut Grove			CR E13 (River Road north) / Theater Street – Locke	East end of Walnut Grove Bridge; west end of River Road on CR J11; western terminus of CR E13
Sacramento	Walnut Grove			Isleton Road – Isleton, Rio Vista, Antioch	
Sacramento	Walnut Grove			Race Track Road	East end of River Road; west end of Walnut Grove Thornton Road
Sacramento–San Joaquin county line				East end of Walnut Grove Thornton Road; west end of Walnut Grove Road	
San Joaquin				I-5 – Los Angeles, Sacramento	Interchange; I-5 exit 493
San Joaquin	Thornton			CR J8 (Thornton Road) – Galt	Eastern terminus
1.000 mi = 1.609 km; 1.000 km = 0.621 mi

== J12 ==
County Road J12
- Location: San Joaquin County
- Length: 19.65 mi (31.62 km)
- Existed: 1960–present

County Route J12 (CR J12) is a county highway in San Joaquin County, California, United States. It runs from Interstate 5 northwest of Lodi to State Route 88 northeast of Clements. Much of the route consists of Peltier Road, along with portions of Tully Road, Jahant Road, Mackville Road, and Collier Road.

Major intersections

The entire route is in San Joaquin County.

Location	mi	km	Destinations	Notes
			I-5 – Sacramento, Los Angeles	Interchange; western terminus; I-5 exit 490; road continues west as Peltier Road
			CR J8 (Thornton Road)	
			CR J10 (Lower Sacramento Road)	
			SR 99 – Fresno, Sacramento	Interchange; SR 99 exit 270; former US 99
			CR J5 (Elliot Road) – Lockeford	Northern terminus of CR J5
			East end of Peltier Road; west end of Tully Road on CR J12	
			Tully Road north, Jahant Road west	East end of Tully Road on CR J12; west end of Jahant Road on CR J12
			Mackville Road south	East end of Jahant Road; west end of Mackville Road on CR J12
Dogtown			Mackville Road north, Collier Road west	East end of Mackville Road on CR J12; west end of Collier Road on CR J12
			SR 88	Eastern terminus
1.000 mi = 1.609 km; 1.000 km = 0.621 mi

== J13 ==
County Road J13
- Tracy Boulevard
- Location: San Joaquin County
- Length: 4.16 mi (6.69 km)

County Route J13 (CR J13) is a county highway in San Joaquin County, California, United States. It is entirely known as Tracy Boulevard from Eleventh Street in Tracy to Lammers Road north of Tracy. Tracy Boulevard itself south of Eleventh Street (without the county route designation) continues, serving the south portion of the city, ending at a dead end just past I-580 in a rural portion of the county. Apart from an advance shield at its northern end, the route is largely unsigned.

Major intersections

The entire route is in San Joaquin County.

Location	mi	km	Destinations	Notes
Tracy	0.0	0.0	Eleventh Street (I-205 BL)	Southern terminus; former US 50; road continues south as Tracy Boulevard
Tracy	1.1	1.8	Grant Line Road (CR J4)	
Tracy	1.8	2.9	I-205 – Stockton, San Francisco	Interchange; I-205 exit 8
	4.3	6.9	CR J2 (Lammers Road, Tracy Boulevard)	Northern terminus
1.000 mi = 1.609 km; 1.000 km = 0.621 mi

== J14 ==
County Road J14
- Location: Calaveras – Stanislaus Counties
- Length: 47.91 mi (77.10 km)
- Existed: 1973–present

County Route J14 (CR J14) is a county highway in Stanislaus and Calaveras counties in the U.S. state of California. It runs from State Route 99 and State Route 165 in Turlock to State Route 26 near Jenny Lind. The route is known as Lander Avenue, Olive Avenue, Golden State Boulevard, Geer Road, Albers Road, Yosemite Avenue, Twenty Six Mile Road, Sonora Road, Milton Road, and Jenny Lind Road.

Major intersections

County	Location	mi	km	Destinations	Notes
Stanislaus	Turlock			SR 165 south (Lander Avenue) – Hilmar, Los Banos	Continuation beyond SR 99; former CR J14 south
Stanislaus	Turlock			SR 99 – Sacramento, Fresno, Los Angeles	Interchange; southern terminus; SR 99 exit 211
Stanislaus	Turlock			CR J17 west (West Main Street) – Patterson	South end of CR J17 overlap
Stanislaus	Turlock			West Olive Avenue west	No left turn from northbound Lander Avenue and from eastbound West Olive Avenue; north end of Lander Avenue; south end of West Olive Avenue on CR J14
Stanislaus	Turlock			North First Street	North end of West Olive Avenue; south end of East Olive Avenue
Stanislaus	Turlock			CR J17 east (North Golden State Boulevard south) / East Olive Avenue east	North end of CR J17 overlap and East Olive Avenue on CR J14; former US 99 south; south end of North Golden State Boulevard on CR J14
Stanislaus	Turlock			North Golden State Boulevard north	Former US 99 north; north end of North Golden State Boulevard on CR J14; south end of Geer Road
Stanislaus	Turlock			Canal Road	
Stanislaus	Turlock			Monte Vista Avenue (University Way)	
Stanislaus	Turlock			Christoffersen Parkway	
Stanislaus	Turlock			Taylor Road	
Stanislaus				Keyes Road	
Stanislaus				Santa Fe Avenue (CR J7) – Denair	
Stanislaus				Whitmore Avenue – Hickman, Hughson	
Stanislaus				Hatch Road	
Stanislaus				SR 132 (Yosemite Boulevard) – Waterford, Empire	North end of Geer Road; south end of Albers Road
Stanislaus				Claribel Road	
Stanislaus				Oakdale Waterford Highway (CR J9 south) / Patterson Road – Riverbank	South end of CR J9 overlap
Stanislaus	Oakdale			North end of Albers Road; south end of South Yosemite Avenue	
Stanislaus	Oakdale			SR 108 / SR 120 east (East F Street) – Sonora, Modesto	South end of SR 120 overlap and North Yosemite Avenue; north end of South Yosemite Avenue
Stanislaus				North end of North Yosemite Avenue	
Stanislaus				SR 120 west / CR J9 north – Escalon	North end of SR 120 / CR J9 overlap; south end of Twenty-Six Mile Road
Stanislaus				North end of Twenty-Six Mile Road; south end of Sonora Road	
Stanislaus				Sonora Road east	North end of Sonora Road on CR J14; south end of Milton Road
Stanislaus				SR 4 – Copperopolis, Farmington	
Calaveras	Jenny Lind			Milton Road north	North end of Milton Road on CR J14; south end of Jenny Lind Road
Calaveras				SR 26 – Valley Springs, Stockton	Northern terminus
1.000 mi = 1.609 km; 1.000 km = 0.621 mi: Concurrency terminus; Incomplete access

== J15 ==
County Road J15
- Location: Tulare County
- Length: 29.99 mi (48.26 km)
- Existed: 1974–present

County Route J15 (CR J15) is an unsigned county highway in Tulare County, California, United States. It runs from Avenue 96 (CR J24) east of Pixley to State Route 201 near Calgro. The route is known as Road 152 from Avenue 96 to State Route 137, a length of 17 miles or 27 kilometers, and intersects State Route 190 at mile 6. The route is also known as Road 140, Lovers Lane, Houston Avenue, Ben Maddox Way, and Road 132.

Major intersections

The entire route is in Tulare County.

Location	mi	km	Destinations	Notes
			Avenue 96 (CR J24) – Pixley, Terra Bella	Southern terminus
			Avenue 120	
			SR 190 (Avenue 144)	Roundabout
			Avenue 152 (CR J26) – Porterville, Tipton	
			Avenue 168 (CR J46) – Woodville	
			Avenue 192	
			SR 137 east (Avenue 232 east) / Road 152 north	South end of SR 137 overlap; north end of Road 152 on CR J15
			SR 137 west (Avenue 232 west) / Road 140 south	North end of SR 137 overlap; south end of Road 140 on CR J15
			Avenue 240	
			Avenue 248	
Visalia			North end of Road 140 on CR J15; south end of Lovers Lane	
Visalia			Caldwill Avenue (CR J30)	
Visalia			Walnut Avenue	
Visalia			SR 198 (Sequoia Freeway)	Interchange; SR 198 exit 108; south end of SR 216 overlap; western terminus of SR 216
Visalia			SR 216 east (Houston Avenue east) / Lovers Lane north – Ivanhoe, Woodlake	North end of SR 216 overlap and Lovers Lane on CR J15; south end of Houston Avenue on CR J15
Visalia			Ben Maddox Way south, Houston Avenue west	North end of Houston Avenue on CR J15; south end of Ben Maddox Way on CR J15
			North end of Ben Maddox Way; south end of Road 132 on CR J15	
			Avenue 328 (CR J34) – Ivanhoe, Woodlake	
			Avenue 368 (CR J36)	
			SR 201 (Avenue 384)	Northern terminus
1.000 mi = 1.609 km; 1.000 km = 0.621 mi: Concurrency terminus

== J16 ==
County Road J16
- Location: Mariposa – Merced – Stanislaus Counties
- Length: 75.74 mi (121.89 km)
- Existed: 1960–present

County Route J16 (CR J16) is a county highway in Stanislaus, Merced, and Mariposa counties in the U.S. state of California. It runs from Interstate 5 west of Westley in the San Joaquin Valley to State Route 49 in Bear Valley in the foothills of the Sierra Nevada. The route is known as Howard Road, Grayson Road, Keyes Road, Merced Falls Road, Hornitos Road, and Bear Valley Road.

Major intersections

County	Location	mi	km	Destinations	Notes
Stanislaus				I-5 (West Side Freeway)	Interchange; western terminus; I-5 exit 441; road continues west as Ingram Creek Road
Stanislaus				McCracken Road, Ingram Creek Road	East end of Ingram Creek Road on CR J16; west end of Howard Road
Stanislaus	Westley			SR 33	East end of Howard Road; west end of Grayson Road
Stanislaus				Crows Landing Road north, Grayson Road east	East end of Grayson Road on CR J16; west end of Crows Landing Road on CR J16
Stanislaus				Keyes Road west, Crows Landing Road south	East end of Crows Landing Road on CR J16; west end of Keyes Road on CR J16
Stanislaus				Central Avenue	
Stanislaus				Faith Home Road	
Stanislaus	Keyes			SR 99 – Fresno, Sacramento	Interchange; SR 99 exit 218
Stanislaus	Keyes			Golden State Boulevard	Former US 99
Stanislaus				Walnut Road	
Stanislaus				Geer Road (CR J14)	
Stanislaus				Santa Fe Avenue (CR J7)	
Stanislaus				Gratton Road	
Stanislaus				CR J9 (Hickman Road) – Turlock, Hickman, Waterford	
Merced				East end of Keyes Road; west end of Montgomery Street	
Merced	Snelling			SR 59 south – Merced	West end of SR 59 overlap; east end of Montgomery Street
Merced	Snelling			CR J59 (La Grange Road) – La Grange, Sonora, Don Pedro Lake	East end of SR 59 overlap; northern terminus of SR 59; southern terminus of CR J59; west end of Merced Falls Road
Merced	Merced Falls			Merced Falls Road to SR 132 – Coulterville, Yosemite	East end of Merced Falls Road on CR J16; west end of Hornitos Road
Mariposa	Hornitos			Hornitos Road – Catheys Valley	East end of Hornitos Road on CR J16; west end of Bear Valley Road
Mariposa				SR 49 – Mariposa, Coulterville	Eastern terminus
1.000 mi = 1.609 km; 1.000 km = 0.621 mi: Concurrency terminus

== J17 ==
County Road J17
- Location: Merced – Stanislaus Counties
- Length: 39.20 mi (63.09 km)
- Existed: 1960–present

County Route J17 (CR J17) is a county highway in Stanislaus and Merced counties in the U.S. state of California. The route is known as Sperry Avenue from Interstate 5 to Patterson, Las Palmas Avenue from Patterson to the San Joaquin River, West Main Street from the San Joaquin River to Turlock, East Avenue from Turlock to Oakdale Road, Oakdale Road from East Avenue to Turlock Road and Turlock Road from Oakdale Road to State Route 59.

Major intersections

County	Location	mi	km	Destinations	Notes
Stanislaus	Patterson			I-5 (West Side Freeway)	Interchange; western terminus; I-5 exit 434; road continues as Diablo Grande Parkway
Stanislaus	Patterson			SR 33 south / Sperry Avenue – Crows Landing	West end of SR 33 overlap; east end of Sperry Avenue on CR J17
Stanislaus	Patterson			SR 33 north (Second Street) / Las Palmas Avenue west – Westley	East end of SR 33 overlap; west end of Las Palmas Avenue on CR J17
Stanislaus				Bridge over the San Joaquin River; East end of Las Palmas Avenue; west end of West Main Street	
Stanislaus				Carpenter Road	
Stanislaus				Crows Landing Road	
Stanislaus				Central Avenue – Ceres, George Hatfield State Park	
Stanislaus				Faith Home Road	
Stanislaus	Turlock			Washington Road	
Stanislaus	Turlock			SR 99 – Fresno, Los Angeles, Sacramento	Interchange; SR 99 exit 213
Stanislaus	Turlock			CR J14 south (Lander Avenue) / West Main Street east – Hilmar	West end of CR J14 overlap and Lander Avenue on CR J17; east end of West Main Street on CR J17
Stanislaus	Turlock			West Olive Avenue west	No left turn from northbound Lander Avenue and from eastbound West Olive Avenue; east end of Lander Avenue; west end of West Olive Avenue on CR J17
Stanislaus	Turlock			North First Street	East end of West Olive Avenue; west end of East Olive Avenue
Stanislaus	Turlock			CR J14 north (North Golden State Boulevard north) / East Olive Avenue east – Denair, Oakdale	East end of CR J14 overlap and East Olive Avenue on CR J17; west end of North Golden State Boulevard on CR J17; former US 99 north
Stanislaus	Turlock			East Main Street	East end of North Golden State Boulevard; west end of South Golden State Boulevard
Stanislaus	Turlock			South Golden State Boulevard south	East end of South Golden State Boulevard on CR J17; west end of East Avenue
Stanislaus				Grafton Road – Denair	
Stanislaus				Santa Fe Avenue (CR J7) – Ballico	
Stanislaus				Hickman Road (CR J9) – Hickman, Waterford, Turlock Lake	Southern terminus of CR J9
Merced				Oakdale Road north, East Avenue east – Montpelier	East end of East Avenue; west end of Oakdale Road on CR J17
Merced				Turlock Road west, Oakdale Road south – Merced	East end of Oakdale Road on CR J17; west end of Turlock Road on CR J17
Merced				SR 59 – Merced, Snelling	Eastern terminus
1.000 mi = 1.609 km; 1.000 km = 0.621 mi: Concurrency terminus; Incomplete access

== J18 ==
County Road J18
- Location: Merced – Stanislaus Counties
- Length: 26.54 mi (42.71 km)
- Existed: 1960–present

County Route J18 (CR J18) is a county highway in Stanislaus and Merced counties in the U.S. state of California. It runs from Interstate 5 near Newman to State Route 99 near Atwater. The route is known as Stuhr Road, Hills Ferry Road, Kelley Road, River Road, and Westside Boulevard.

Route description

County Route J18 begins at its western end at Interstate 5 near Newman. It follows Stuhr Road from I-5 to Hills Ferry Road. It briefly follows Hills Ferry Road to the confluence of the Merced and San Joaquin rivers, where it becomes Kelley Road. It then follows River Road, paralleling the Merced River to the north. As CR J18 reaches State Route 165, it diverges from River Road as it is co-routed with SR 165 for a very brief distance. After departing from SR 165, CR J18 is routed onto Westside Boulevard all the way to its eastern end at State Route 99. The road itself continues as Bellevue Road for a short distance, but does not connect with Bellevue Road in Atwater due to a Dole processing plant currently occupying the road's right-of-way.

Major intersections

County	Location	mi	km	Destinations	Notes
Stanislaus				I-5 (West Side Freeway)	Interchange; western terminus; I-5 exit 423
Stanislaus				SR 33 – Newman, Crows Landing	
Stanislaus				Hills Ferry Road west – Newman	East end of Stuhr Road; west end of Hills Ferry Road on CR J18
Stanislaus				River Road	
Stanislaus–Merced county line				East end of Hills Ferry Road; west end of Kelley Road	
Merced				Kelley Road – Hilmar, Turlock, Ceres	East end of Kelley Road on CR J18; west end of River Road on CR J18
Merced				SR 165 north (Lander Avenue) / River Road – Hilmar, Turlock, Livingston	West end of SR 165 overlap; east end of River Road on CR J18
Merced				SR 165 south (Lander Avenue) – Stevinson, Newman, Los Banos	East end of SR 165 overlap; west end of Westside Boulevard
Merced				Lincoln Boulevard	
Merced				Sultana Drive	
Merced				SR 99	Interchange; eastern terminus; SR 99 exit 198; road continues east as Bellevue Road
1.000 mi = 1.609 km; 1.000 km = 0.621 mi: Concurrency terminus

== J19 ==
County Road J19
- Location: Fresno – Tulare Counties
- Length: 25.65 mi (41.28 km)
- Existed: 1964–present

County Route J19 (CR J19) is a county highway in Tulare and Fresno counties in the U.S. state of California. It runs from State Route 198 in Visalia to State Route 63 in Orange Cove. The route is known as Plaza Drive, Road 80, Alta Avenue, Manning Avenue, and Hills Valley Road. Apart from a few lingering shields, CR J19 is largely unsigned.

Major intersections

County	Location	mi	km	Destinations	Notes
Tulare	Visalia			SR 198 (Sequoia Freeway) to SR 99 – Hanford, Visalia	Interchange; southern terminus; SR 198 exit 102; road continues south as Plaza Drive
Tulare	Visalia			Goshen Avenue (CR J32)	
Tulare	Visalia			Riggin Avenue (Avenue 312)	
Tulare				Avenue 320	North end of Plaza Drive; south end of Road 80 (first segment) on CR J19
Tulare				Avenue 328 (CR J34) – Ivanhoe, Woodlake	
Tulare				Avenue 368 (CR J36) to SR 99 – Traver, Sequoia Lake	
Tulare				Avenue 384 (CR J38) to SR 99 – Woodlake	
Tulare				SR 201 (Avenue 400)	
Tulare	Dinuba			North end of Road 80 (first segment); south end of Alta Avenue (first segment)	
Tulare	Dinuba			CR J40 (El Monte Way) to SR 99 north – Orosi, Cutler	
Tulare	Dinuba			Nebraska Avenue (Avenue 424)	North end of Alta Avenue (first segment); south end of Road 80 (second segment)
Tulare–Fresno county line				Floral Avenue (Avenue 432)	North end of Road 80; south end of Alta Avenue (second segment)
Fresno				Dinuba Avenue – Reedley	
Fresno				Manning Avenue west, Alta Avenue north – Reedley, Fresno	North end of Alta Avenue (second segment) on CR J19; south end of Manning Avenue on CR J19
Fresno				Avenue 448, Hills Valley Road south	North end of Manning Avenue; south end of Hills Valley Road on CR J19
Fresno	Orange Cove			SR 63 (Hills Valley Road, Sumner Avenue) / Park Boulevard	Northern terminus
1.000 mi = 1.609 km; 1.000 km = 0.621 mi

== J20 ==
County Road J20
- Location: Mariposa – Tuolumne Counties
- Length: 14.72 mi (23.69 km)
- Existed: 1965–1997

County Route J20 (CR J20) was a county highway in Tuolumne and Mariposa counties in the U.S. state of California. It ran from its western terminus at State Route 49 east and north to State Route 120. It was the continuation of State Route 132 east of Coulterville. It was renumbered as County Route J132 in 1997 for continuity with the current State Route 132.

== J21 ==
County Road J21
- Dry Creek Drive
- Location: Tulare County
- Length: 18.21 mi (29.31 km)
- Existed: 1968–present

.

County Route J21 (CR J21), known entirely as Dry Creek Drive, is an unsigned county highway in Tulare County, California, United States. It runs from State Route 245 (Millwood Drive) near Badger to State Route 216 outside of Woodlake. Defined in 1968, it runs 18.21 miles (29.31 km) from an elevation of approximately 3,000 feet (914 m) near Badger to approximately 400 feet (122 m) near Woodlake.

Major intersections

The entire route is in Tulare County.

Location	mi	km	Destinations	Notes
			SR 216 (Lomitas Drive)	Southern terminus
			SR 245 – Badger, Eshom Camp	Northern terminus
1.000 mi = 1.609 km; 1.000 km = 0.621 mi

== J22 ==
County Road J22
- Location: Tulare County
- Length: 31.87 mi (51.29 km)
- Existed: 1968–present

County Route J22 (CR J22) is an unsigned county highway in Tulare County, California, United States. It runs from Road 16 west of Alpaugh to Old Stage Road in Fountain Springs. The route is known as Avenue 54, Center Avenue in Alpaugh, Borchardt Drive, Avenue 56, and Sierra Avenue in Earlimart.

Major intersections

The entire route is in Tulare County.

Location	mi	km	Destinations	Notes
			Road 16 (4th Avenue)	Western terminus
Alpaugh			Road 34	East end of Avenue 54 (first segment); west end of Center Avenue
Alpaugh			Tule Road (CR J33)	Southern terminus of CR J33
Alpaugh			Road 42	East end of Center Avenue; west end of Avenue 54 (second segment)
			East end of Avenue 54 on CR J22; west end of Borchardt Drive	
			East end Borchardt Drive; west end of Avenue 56 (first segment) on CR J22	
			SR 43 (Central Valley Highway) – Allensworth	
Earlimart			Howard Road	East end of Avenue 56 (first segment); west end of Sierra Avenue
Earlimart			Front Road	Former US 99 (1926–1955)
Earlimart			SR 99	Interchange; SR 99 north exit 65, south exit 65A (as Avenue 56); former US 99 (1955–1964)
Earlimart			Dietz Road (Road 140)	East end of Sierra Avenue; west end of Avenue 56 (second segment)
			Road 192 (CR J27) – Poplar	
Ducor			SR 65 – Bakersfield, Porterville	
Ducor			Road 236 – Terra Bella	Former SR 65
Fountain Springs			Old Stage Road (Mountain Road 109) – Posey, Glennville	Eastern terminus
Fountain Springs			Hot Springs Road (Mountain Road 56) – California Hot Springs, Pine Flat	Continuation beyond Old Stage Road (Mountain Road 109)
1.000 mi = 1.609 km; 1.000 km = 0.621 mi

== J23 ==
County Road J23
- Location: Tulare County
- Length: 17.39 mi (27.99 km)
- Existed: 1974–present

County Route J23 (CR J23) is an unsigned county highway in Tulare County, California, United States. It runs from State Route 137 east of Tulare to State Route 201 in Seville, passing through the towns of Farmersville and Ivanhoe. The route is known as Road 168, Road 164, Farmersville Boulevard, Avenue 296, Road 158, Avenue 328, and Avenue 156.

Major intersections

The entire route is in Tulare County.

Location	mi	km	Destinations	Notes
			SR 137 – Tulare, Lindsay	Southern terminus
			Avenue 240	
			Road 168 north	North end of Road 168 on CR J23; south end of Drive 164
			Avenue 248	North end of Drive 164; south end of Road 164 on CR J23
Farmersville			North end of Road 164 on CR J23; south end of Farmersville Boulevard	
Farmersville			Visalia Road (CR J30)	
Farmersville			Walnut Avenue	
			SR 198 (Sequoia Freeway)	Interchange; SR 198 exit 111
			Avenue 296 east	Nortn end of Farmersville Boulevard; south end of Avenue 296 on CR J23
			Avenue 296 west	North end of Avenue 296 on CR J23; south end of Road 158
			SR 216 west – Visalia	South end of SR 216 overlap; north end of Road 158 on CR J23
Ivanhoe			SR 216 east (Avenue 328 east) / Road 160 / Depot Drive – Woodlake	North end of SR 216 overlap; south end of CR J34 overlap and Avenue 328 on CR J23; eastern terminus of CR J34
Ivanhoe			Avenue 328 west (CR J34) / Road 156 south	North end of CR J34 overlap and Avenue 328 on CR J23; south end of Road 156 on CR J23
Seville			SR 201	Northern terminus
1.000 mi = 1.609 km; 1.000 km = 0.621 mi: Concurrency terminus

== J24 ==
County Road J24
- Location: Tulare County
- Length: 13.00 mi (20.92 km)
- Existed: 1970–present

County Route J24 (CR J24) is an unsigned county highway in Tulare County, California, United States. It runs from State Route 99 in Pixley to Old Stage Road east of Terra Bella. The route is known as Terra Bella Avenue, Avenue 95, and Avenue 96.

Major intersections

The entire route is in Tulare County.

Location	mi	km	Destinations	Notes
Pixley			SR 99 / Main Street	Interchange; western terminus; SR 99 exit 70A; Main Street is former US 99; road continues west as Terra Bella Avenue (Avenue 96)
			Road 152 (CR J15) – Woodville, Porterville, Visalia	
			Road 192 (CR J27 north) – Poplar, Porterville	West end of CR J27 overlap
			Road 192 (CR J27 south) – Ducor, Earlimart	East end of CR J27 overlap
Terra Bella			SR 65	
Terra Bella			Road 236	Former SR 65
			Old Stage Road (Mountain Road 109)	Eastern terminus; road continues east as Avenue 96
1.000 mi = 1.609 km; 1.000 km = 0.621 mi: Concurrency terminus

== J25 ==
County Road J25
- Road 68
- Location: Tulare County
- Length: 8.45 mi (13.60 km)
- Existed: 1971–present

County Route J25 (CR J25), known entirely as Road 68, is an unsigned county highway in Tulare County, California, United States. It runs from State Route 137 west of Tulare to the overpass of State Route 198 south of Goshen.

CR J25 ended at an at-grade intersection with SR 198 until 2012, when SR 198 was expanded to a four-lane expressway between State Route 43 near Hanford and State Route 99. An overpass was built for CR J25 as part of the expressway project, but is directly inaccessible to and from SR 198. Access to SR 198 is via Avenue 298 and Road 64.

Major intersections

The entire route is in Tulare County.

Location	mi	km	Destinations	Notes
			SR 137 (Avenue 228)	Southern terminus; road continues south as Road 68
			Avenue 232	
			Avenue 280	
			Overpass over SR 198; no access	Northern terminus; former at-grade intersection; road continues north as Road 68
1.000 mi = 1.609 km; 1.000 km = 0.621 mi: Closed/former

== J26 ==
County Road J26
- Location: Tulare County
- Length: 15.85 mi (25.51 km)
- Existed: 1970–present

County Route J26 (CR J26) is an unsigned county highway in Tulare County, California, United States. It runs from State Route 99 in Tipton to State Route 65 in Porterville. It is known as Olive Avenue in Tipton and Porterville and Avenue 152 between Tipton and Porterville.

Major intersections

The entire route is in Tulare County.

Location	mi	km	Destinations	Notes
Tipton			SR 99	Interchange; western terminus; SR 99 exit 77 (as Avenue 152); road continues west as Olive Avenue
			Road 120	East end of Olive Avenue (first segment); west end of Avenue 152 on CR J26
			Road 152 (CR J15) – Visalia	
			Road 192 (CR J27) – Poplar, Plainview	
			Road 208	
Porterville			East end of Avenue 152 on CR J26; west end of Olive Avenue (second segment)	
Porterville			Westwood Street	
Porterville			Newcomb Street	
Porterville			SR 65	Interchange; eastern terminus; SR 65 exit 44; road continues east as Olive Avenue
1.000 mi = 1.609 km; 1.000 km = 0.621 mi

== J27 ==
County Road J27
- Location: Tulare County
- Length: 31.63 mi (50.90 km)
- Existed: 1975–present

County Route J27 (CR J27) is an unsigned county highway in Tulare County, California, United States. It runs from County Line Road (CR J44) east of Delano to State Route 245 northwest of Woodlake. The route is known as Road 192, a portion of Avenue 192, Road 196, and Millwood Drive.

Major intersections

The entire route is in Tulare County.

Location	mi	km	Destinations	Notes
			County Line Road (Avenue 0) (CR J44)	Southern terminus
			Avenue 56 (CR J22) – Earlimart, Ducor, Fountain Springs	
			Avenue 96 (CR J24 east) – Terra Bella	South end of CR J24 overlap
			Avenue 96 (CR J24 west) – Pixley	North end of CR J24 overlap
Poplar			SR 190 (Avenue 144)	
			Avenue 152 (CR J26) to SR 99 – Porterville	
			Avenue 168 (CR J46) – Woodville	Eastern terminus of CR J46
			Avenue 192 west – Tulare	North end of Road 192 on CR J27; south end of Avenue 192 on CR J27
			Avenue 192 east, Road 196 south – Porterville	North end of Avenue 192 on CR J27; south end of Road 196 (first segment) on CR J27
Plainview			Avenue 196 (CR J28) – Strathmore	Western terminus of CR J28
			SR 65 south / SR 137 west (Avenue 232) – Lindsay, Porterville, Tulare	South end of SR 65 overlap; eastern terminus of SR 137
Exeter			Firebaugh Avenue (CR J30)	
			SR 198 – Sequoia Park, Visalia	North end of SR 65 overlap; northern terminus of SR 65 southern segment
			Avenue 336 west	North end of Road 196 (first segment) on CR J27; south end of Avenue 336 on CR J27
			Avenue 336 east	North end of Avenue 336 on CR J27; south end of Road 196 (second segment) on CR J27
Woodlake			SR 216 (Avenue 344)	
			Millwood Drive south	North end of Road 196 (second segment) on CR J27; south end of Millwood Drive on CR J27
			SR 245 (Avenue 364, Millwood Drive north)	Northern terminus
1.000 mi = 1.609 km; 1.000 km = 0.621 mi: Concurrency terminus

== J28 ==
County Road J28
- Location: Tulare County
- Length: 18.46 mi (29.71 km)
- Existed: 1970–present

County Route J28 (CR J28) is an unsigned county highway in Tulare County, California, United States. It runs from Road 196 (CR J27) in Plainview to State Route 190 near Springville.

Major intersections

The entire route is in Tulare County.

Location	mi	km	Destinations	Notes
Plainview			Road 196 (CR J27) – Exeter, Poplar	Western terminus; road continues west as Avenue 196
Strathmore			SR 65 – Porterville, Lindsay	
Strathmore			Orange Belt Drive	Former SR 65
			Road 196 east	East end of Road 196 on CR J28; west end of Road 276
			Road 276 south	East end of Road 276 on CR J28; west end of Mountain Road 178
			Avenue 176 west	East end of Mountain Road 178; west end of Avenue 176 on CR J28
			Road 292	East end of Avenue 176 on CR J28; west end of Mountain Road 176
			Avenue 176 east to Road 320 north	East end of Mountain Road 176; west end of Road 320 on CR J28
			SR 190 – Porterville, Springville	Eastern terminus; road continues as River Island Drive
1.000 mi = 1.609 km; 1.000 km = 0.621 mi

== J29 ==
County Road J29
- Location: Tulare County
- Length: 12.45 mi (20.04 km)
- Existed: 1971–present

County Route J29 (CR J29) is an unsigned county highway in Tulare County, California, United States. It runs from State Route 190 in Porterville to State Route 65 in Lindsay. The route is known as Main Street, Orange Belt Drive, Mirage Avenue, and Hermosa Street. Prior to relocating to its current alignment to the west in the 1970s, much of the route is the original alignment of SR 65.

Major intersections

The entire route is in Tulare County.

Location	mi	km	Destinations	Notes
Porterville			SR 190 west	Interchange; southern terminus; no access to SR 190 east or from SR 190 west; road continues south as Main Street (former SR 65 south)
Porterville			Orange Avenue	
Porterville			Olive Avenue	
Porterville			Morton Avenue	
Porterville			Henderson Avenue	
Porterville			Avenue 178	North end of Main Street; south end of Orange Belt Drive
Strathmore			Avenue 196 (CR J28)	
Lindsay			Lindmore Street	North end of Orange Belt Drive; south end of Mirage Avenue
Lindsay			Mirage Avenue north, Hermosa Street east	Former SR 65 north; north end of Mirage Avenue on CR J29; south end of Hermosa Street on CR J29
Lindsay			SR 65	Northern terminus; road continues west as Hermosa Street
1.000 mi = 1.609 km; 1.000 km = 0.621 mi: Incomplete access

== J30 ==
County Road J30
- Location: Tulare County
- Length: 14.36 mi (23.11 km)
- Existed: 1971–present

County Route J30 (CR J30) is an unsigned county highway in Tulare County, California, United States. It runs from State Route 99 near Visalia to State Route 65 in Exeter, passing through Visalia and Farmersville. The route is known as Caldwell Avenue, as well as portions of Avenue 280, Visalia Road, Belmont Avenue, and Firebaugh Avenue.

Major intersections

The entire route is in Tulare County.

Location	mi	km	Destinations	Notes
			SR 99	Interchange; western terminus; SR 99 exit 94; road continues west as Avenue 280
			Shirk Road (Road 92)	
Visalia			Akers Avenue	
Visalia			Demaree Street	
Visalia			SR 63 (Mooney Boulevard)	
Visalia			Court Street	
Visalia			Ben Maddox Way	
Visalia			Lovers Lane (CR J15)	East end of Caldwell Avenue; west end of Avenue 280 on CR J30
			Road 156	
Farmersville			East end of Avenue 280 on CR J30; west end of Visalia Road	
Farmersville			Farmersville Boulevard (CR J23)	
Exeter			Visalia Road east, Belmont Avenue north	East end of Visalia Road on CR J30; west end of Belmont Avenue on CR J30
Exeter			Belmont Avenue south	East end of Belmont Avenue on CR J30; west end of Firebaugh Avenue
Exeter			SR 65 (Kaweah Avenue)	Eastern terminus; road continues east as Firebaugh Avenue
1.000 mi = 1.609 km; 1.000 km = 0.621 mi

== J31 ==
County Road J31
- Location: Tulare County
- Length: 6.03 mi (9.70 km)
- Existed: 1975–present

County Route J31 (CR J31) is an unsigned county highway in Tulare County, California, United States. It runs from Avenue 368 (CR J36) east of Traver to Avenue 416 (CR J40) west of Dinuba. The route is known as Road 60, Avenue 384, and Road 56.

Major intersections

The entire route is in Tulare County.

Location	mi	km	Destinations	Notes
			Avenue 368 (CR J36)	Southern terminus
			Avenue 384 east (CR J38 east) – Visalia, Woodlake	South end of CR J38 overlap and Avenue 384 on CR J31; north end of Road 60 on CR J31
			Avenue 384 west (CR J38 west) to SR 99	North end of CR J38 overlap and Avenue 384 on CR J31; south end of Road 56 on CR J31
			SR 201 (Avenue 400) – Woodlake, Kingsburg	
			CR J40 (Avenue 416)	Northern terminus; road continues north as Road 56
1.000 mi = 1.609 km; 1.000 km = 0.621 mi: Concurrency terminus

== J32 ==
County Road J32
- Location: Tulare County
- Length: 7.98 mi (12.84 km)
- Existed: 1972–present

County Route J32 (CR J32) is an unsigned county highway in Tulare County, California, United States. It runs from State Route 99 in Goshen to State Route 63 (Locust and Court Streets) in Visalia. The route is known and runs on portions of Betty Drive, Robinson Road, Avenue 310, Camp Drive, Goshen Avenue, and Murray Avenue.

The initial portion of the route originally ran on Elder Avenue, crossing the railroad tracks to Camp Drive. A realignment in the 2010s occurred when Betty Drive was expanded to a four-lane roadway and was re-routed over the railroad tracks to connect to Riggin Avenue. The railroad crossing at Elder Avenue was eliminated and was cut off from traffic coming from SR 99, converting to a three-block neighborhood street.

Major intersections

The entire route is in Tulare County.

Location	mi	km	Destinations	Notes
Goshen	0.0	0.0	SR 99	Interchange; western terminus; former US 99; SR 99 exit 98; road continues west as Betty Drive to Road 64
Goshen	0.6	0.97	Robinson Road north, Betty Drive east	East end of Betty Drive on CR J32; west end of Robinson Road on CR J32; Betty Drive east connects to Riggin Avenue
Goshen	0.8	1.3	Avenue 310 east, Robinson Road south	East end of Robinson Road on CR J32; west end of Avenue 310 on CR J32
Goshen	1.0	1.6	East end of Avenue 310; west end of Camp Drive	
Goshen–Visalia line	1.8	2.9	Camp Drive south, Goshen Avenue west	East end of Camp Drive on CR J32; west end of Goshen Avenue on CR J32
Visalia	2.9	4.7	Plaza Avenue (CR J19)	
Visalia	4.4	7.1	Shirk Street	
Visalia	5.4	8.7	Akers Street	
Visalia	6.4	10.3	Demaree Street	
Visalia	7.7	12.4	Divisadero Street	East end of Goshen Avenue on CR J32; west end of Murray Avenue
Visalia	8.6	13.8	SR 63 south (Locust Street)	One-way southbound
Visalia	8.7	14.0	SR 63 north (Court Street)	Eastern terminus; one-way northbound; road continues east as Murray Avenue
1.000 mi = 1.609 km; 1.000 km = 0.621 mi

== J33 ==
County Road J33
- Location: Tulare County
- Length: 7.56 mi (12.17 km)
- Existed: 1975–present

County Route J33 (CR J33) is an unsigned county highway in Tulare County, California, United States. It runs from Center Avenue (CR J22) in Alpaugh to State Route 43 south of Corcoran. The route is known as Tule Avenue, Road 38, Kinsman Drive, Road 40, and Avenue 112.

Major intersections

The entire route is in Tulare County.

Location	mi	km	Destinations	Notes
Alpaugh			Center Avenue (CR J22)	Southern terminus; road continues south as Tule Road
Alpaugh			Atwell Avenue	North end of Tule Road; south end of Road 38 on CR J33
			Avenue 68	North end of Road 38; south end of Kinsman Drive
			Road 40 south	North end of Kinsman Drive; south end of Road 40 on CR J33
			Avenue 112 west	North end of Road 40 on CR J33; south end of Avenue 112 on CR J33
			SR 43 (Central Valley Highway)	Northern terminus; road continues east as Avenue 112
1.000 mi = 1.609 km; 1.000 km = 0.621 mi

== J34 ==
County Road J34
- Avenue 328
- Location: Tulare County
- Length: 12.9 mi (20.8 km)
- Existed: 1971–present

County Route J34 (CR J34), known entirely as Avenue 328, is an unsigned county highway in Tulare County, California, United States. It runs from the overpass of State Route 99 to State Route 216 in Ivanhoe.

Major intersections

The entire route is in Tulare County.

Location	mi	km	Destinations	Notes
			Overpass over SR 99; no access	Western terminus; road continues west as Avenue 328
			Road 80 (CR J19) to SR 198 – Dinuba	
			SR 63 (Road 124) – Visalia, Cutler	
			Road 132 (CR J15) – Visalia	
Ivanhoe			Road 156 (CR J23 north)	West end of CR J23 overlap
Ivanhoe			SR 216 (Avenue 328, Road 160, CR J23 south) / Depot Drive – Visalia, Woodlake	Eastern terminus; east end of CR J23 overlap
1.000 mi = 1.609 km; 1.000 km = 0.621 mi: Concurrency terminus

== J35 ==
County Road J35
- Location: Tulare County
- Length: 7.66 mi (12.33 km)
- Existed: 1975–present

County Route J35 (CR J35) is an unsigned county highway in Tulare County, California, United States. It runs from Avenue 4 (CR J44) in Richgrove to Avenue 56 (CR J22) near Ducor. The route is known as Richgrove Drive and Road 232. Much of the route is an original and former alignment of State Route 65 before the state highway was moved to its current alignments.

Major intersections

The entire route is in Tulare County.

Location	mi	km	Destinations	Notes
Richgrove			Avenue 4 (CR J44)	Southern terminus; eastern terminus of CR J44; road continues south as Richgrove Drive (former SR 65 south)
			North end of Richgrove Drive; south end of Road 232	
			Avenue 56 (CR J22)	Northern terminus; connects to SR 65; road continues north as Road 232
1.000 mi = 1.609 km; 1.000 km = 0.621 mi

== J36 ==
County Road J36
- Location: Tulare County
- Length: 2.94 mi (4.73 km)
- Existed: 1975–present

County Route J36 (CR J36) is an unsigned county highway in Tulare County, California, United States. It runs from State Route 99 in Traver to Road 132 (CR J15) south of Calgro. The route is known as Merritt Drive and Avenue 368.

Major intersections

The entire route is in Tulare County.

Location	mi	km	Destinations	Notes
Traver			SR 99	Interchange; western terminus; SR 99 north exit 106B, south exit 106; road continues as Merritt Drive to Road 36
Traver			Drive 39 (6th Street)	Former US 99
Traver			Avenue 368 west	East end of Merritt Drive; west end of Avenue 368 on CR J36
			Road 60 (CR J31)	Southern terminus of CR J31
			Road 80 (CR J19)	
			SR 63 (Road 124)	
			Road 132 (CR J15)	Eastern terminus; road continues east as Avenue 368
1.000 mi = 1.609 km; 1.000 km = 0.621 mi

== J37 ==
County Road J37
- Balch Park Road
- Location: Tulare County
- Length: 25.17 mi (40.51 km)
- Existed: 1975–present

County Route J37 (CR J37), known entirely as Balch Park Road, is a county highway in Tulare County, California, United States. It runs from State Route 190 near Springville to near Balch Park in the Sierra Nevada mountains. It is the only signed county route in Tulare County.

Major intersections

The entire route is in Tulare County.

Location	mi	km	Destinations	Notes
			SR 190	Southern terminus
			Yokohl Valley Drive to SR 198 – Exeter, Visalia	
			Northern terminus; road continues as Balch Park Road to Balch Park	
1.000 mi = 1.609 km; 1.000 km = 0.621 mi

== J38 ==
County Road J38
- Location: Tulare County

County Route J38 (CR J38) is an unsigned county highway in Tulare County, California, United States. It runs from State Route 99 southeast of Kingsburg to State Routes 63 and 201 in Calgro. Most of the route is known as Avenue 384.

Major intersections

The entire route is in Tulare County.

Location	mi	km	Destinations	Notes
			SR 99	Interchange; western terminus; SR 99 exit 109 (as Avenue 384); road continues as Drive 24
			Drive 27	East end of Drive 24; west end of Drive 27 on CR J38
			East end of Drive 27; west end of Avenue 384 on CR J38	
			Road 56 (CR J31 north) – Reedley	West end of CR J31 overlap
			Road 60 (CR J31 south) – London	East end of CR J31 overlap
			Road 80 (CR J19) – Visalia, Dinuba	
Calgro			SR 63 / SR 201 west (Road 80) – Visalia, Cutler, Orosi	Eastern terminus
Calgro			SR 201 east (Avenue 384) – Yettem, Woodlake	Continuation beyond SR 63
1.000 mi = 1.609 km; 1.000 km = 0.621 mi: Concurrency terminus

== J40 ==
County Road J40
- Location: Fresno – Tulare Counties

County Route J40 (CR J40) is a county highway in Fresno and Tulare counties in the U.S. state of California. It runs from State Route 99 southeast of Selma to State Route 63 in Orosi, passing through the communities of Dinuba and Sultana. The route is known as Mountain View Avenue in Fresno County, Avenue 416 in Tulare County, and El Monte Way within and near the cities of Dinuba and Orosi. Apart from a sporadic number of shields along or near the route, it is largely unsigned.

Major intersections

County	Location	mi	km	Destinations	Notes
Fresno				SR 99	Interchange; western terminus; SR 99 exit 115; road continues west as Mountain View Avenue
Fresno				Golden State Boulevard	Former US 99
Fresno				Academy Avenue	
Fresno				Mendocino Avenue	
Fresno–Tulare county line				East end of Mountain View Avenue; west end of Avenue 416 (first segment)	
Tulare				Road 56 (CR J31) – Reedley	
Tulare				East end of Avenue 416 (first segment); west end of El Monte Way (first segment)	
Tulare	Dinuba			Alta Avenue (CR J19) to SR 99 south – Reedley, Orange Cove	
Tulare	Dinuba			Crawford Avenue	
Tulare				East end of El Monte Way (first segment); west end of Avenue 416 (second segment)	
Tulare	Sultana			Road 104 – Visalia	
Tulare				Road 120 to SR 180 – Orange Cove, Kings Canyon National Park, Sequoia National Park	
Tulare	Orosi			East end of Avenue 416 (second segment); west end of El Monte Way (second segment)	
Tulare	Orosi			SR 63 (Road 128)	Eastern terminus; road continues east as El Monte Way
1.000 mi = 1.609 km; 1.000 km = 0.621 mi

== J41 ==
County Road J41
- Location: Inyo – Tulare Counties

County Route J41 (CR J41) is an unsigned county highway in Inyo and Tulare County, California, United States. It runs from US 395 near Pearsonville to the Kennedy Meadows Campground in the Sierra Nevada mountains. The route is known as Nine Mile Canyon Road in Inyo County and Kennedy Meadows Road in Tulare County. It is the only county route in Inyo County.

Major intersections

County	Location	mi	km	Destinations	Notes
Inyo				US 395 – Mojave, Bishop	Southern terminus
Inyo–Tulare county line				North end of Nine Mile Canyon Road; south end of Kennedy Meadows Road	
Tulare				Kennedy Meadows Campground	Northern terminus
1.000 mi = 1.609 km; 1.000 km = 0.621 mi

== J42 ==
County Road J42
- Location: Tulare County

County Route J42 (CR J42) is an unsigned county highway in Tulare County, California, United States. It runs from State Route 190 east of Porterville to the Tule River Reservation. The route is known as Road 284, Avenue 138 and Reservation Road.

Major intersections

The entire route is in Tulare County.

Location	mi	km	Destinations	Notes
			SR 190 – Springville, Porterville	Roundabout; western terminus; road continues north as Road 284
			Avenue 138 west	East end of Road 284; west end of Avenue 138 on CR J42
			Avenue 138 east	East end of Avenue 138 on CR J42; west end of Reservation Road
			Tule River Reservation	Eastern terminus; road continues as Reservation Road
1.000 mi = 1.609 km; 1.000 km = 0.621 mi

== J44 ==
County Road J44
- Location: Kern – Tulare Counties

County Route J44 (CR J44) is an unsigned county highway in Kern and Tulare counties in the U.S. state of California. It runs from State Route 99 in Delano to Richgrove Drive (CR J35) in Richgrove. Most of the route sits on the Kern-Tulare county line and is known as County Line Road / Avenue 0. It is the only county route in Kern County. In Tulare County, it is known as Road 200 and Avenue 4.

Major intersections

County	Location	mi	km	Destinations	Notes
Kern–Tulare county line	Delano			SR 99	Interchange; western terminus; SR 99 exit 58; road continues west as County Line Road / Avenue 0
Kern–Tulare county line	Delano			Road 152, Randolph Street	
Kern–Tulare county line	Delano			Road 156, Browning Road	
Kern–Tulare county line				Road 192 (CR J27)	Southern terminus of CR J27
Tulare				East end of County Line Road / Avenue 0; west end of Road 200	
Tulare				Road 200 north	East end of Road 200 on CR J44; west end of Avenue 4 on CR J44
Tulare	Richgrove			Richgrove Drive (CR J35)	Eastern terminus; southern terminus of CR J35
1.000 mi = 1.609 km; 1.000 km = 0.621 mi

== J46 ==
County Road J46
- Avenue 168
- Location: Tulare County

County Route J46 (CR J46), known entirely as Avenue 168, is an unsigned county highway in Tulare County, California, United States. It runs from Road 152 (CR J15) to Road 192 (CR J27), passing through the small community of Woodville.

Major intersections

The entire route is in Tulare County.

Location	mi	km	Destinations	Notes
			Road 152 (CR J15)	Western terminus; road continues west as Avenue 168
Woodville			Road 168	
			Road 192 (CR J27) – Poplar, Porterville, Lindsay	Eastern terminus; road continues east as Avenue 168
1.000 mi = 1.609 km; 1.000 km = 0.621 mi

== J59 ==
County Road J59
- La Grange Road
- Location: Merced – Stanislaus – Tuolumne counties
- Length: 26.12 mi (42.04 km)

County Route J59 (CR J59), known entirely as La Grange Road, is a county highway in Merced, Stanislaus, and Tuolumne counties in the U.S. state of California. The route is located in the foothills of the Sierra Nevada. It is the continuation of State Route 59 north of Snelling and connects with State Routes 108 and 120 near the small community of Keystone.

Major intersections

County	Location	mi	km	Destinations	Notes
Merced	Snelling	0.0	0.0	SR 59 south / CR J16 (Merced Falls Road) – Merced, Merced Falls, Hornitos	Southern terminus
Stanislaus		10.7	17.2	SR 132 (Yosemite Boulevard) – La Grange, Coulterville, Modesto	
Tuolumne		26.1	42.0	SR 108 / SR 120 – Oakdale, Sonora	Northern terminus
1.000 mi = 1.609 km; 1.000 km = 0.621 mi

== J132 ==
County Road J132
- Location: Mariposa – Tuolumne counties
- Existed: 1997–present

County Route J132 (CR J132) is a county highway in Tuolumne and Mariposa counties in the U.S. state of California. It runs from its western terminus at State Route 49 east and north to State Route 120. It is the continuation of State Route 132 east of Coulterville. The route is known as Greeley Hill Road and Smith Station Road.

CR J132 was numbered CR J20 until 1997.

Major intersections

County	Location	mi	km	Destinations	Notes
Mariposa	Coulterville			SR 49 – Mariposa, Sonora	Western terminus
Mariposa				Greeley Hill Road	East end of Greeley Hill Road on CR J132; west end of Smith Station Road
Tuolumne				SR 120 – Groveland, Yosemite	Eastern terminus
1.000 mi = 1.609 km; 1.000 km = 0.621 mi
