= California State Route 216 =

Highway in California

State Route 216

- Map of Tulare County in central California with SR 216 highlighted in red

Route information
- Maintained by Caltrans
- Length: 18.275 mi (29.411 km)

Major junctions
- West end: SR 198 in Visalia
- East end: SR 198 near Woodlake

Location
- Country: United States
- State: California
- Counties: Tulare

Highway system
- State highways in California; Interstate; US; State; Scenic; History; Pre‑1964; Unconstructed; Deleted; Freeways
← I-215	→ SR 217

State Route 216 (SR 216) is a state highway in the U.S. state of California. It is a loop of State Route 198 in Tulare County, running from Visalia to Ivanhoe and Woodlake.

== Route description ==
Route 216 is defined in section 516 of the California Streets and Highways Code, and that the highway is "from Visalia to Route 198 near Lemon Cove via Woodlake".

State Route 216 begins at State Route 198 in Visalia with an interchange. It then continues to Ivanhoe, where it meets County Route J34. As it continues through Tulare County, it enters Woodlake, where it meets State Route 245. It then meets County Route J21 before meeting its north end at State Route 198.

The portion of SR 216 in the Visalia city limits is part of the National Highway System, a network of highways that are considered essential to the country's economy, defense, and mobility by the Federal Highway Administration.

== Major intersections ==
Except where prefixed with a letter, postmiles were measured on the road as it was in 1964, based on the alignment that existed at the time, and do not necessarily reflect current mileage. Postmile prefixes include: R reflecting a realignment in the route since then, M indicating a second realignment, L referring to an overlap due to a correction or change, and T indicating postmiles classified as temporary. Segments that remain unconstructed or have been relinquished to local control may be omitted. The entire route is in Tulare County.

Location	Postmile	Destinations	Notes
Visalia	R0.00	SR 198 / Lovers Lane (CR J15 south)	Interchange; SR 198 exit 108; west end of CR J15 overlap
Visalia		Houston Avenue (CR J15 north) / Lovers Lane	East end of CR J15 overlap
		Road 158 (CR J23 south) to SR 198	West end of CR J23 overlap
Ivanhoe	6.95	Avenue 328 (CR J23 north) / Road 160	East end of CR J23 overlap
Hillmaid		Road 196 (CR J27)	
Woodlake	14.01	SR 245 (Valencia Boulevard)	Roundabout
	18.67	Dry Creek Drive (CR J21) - Badger, Pinehurst	
	19.24	SR 198 (Sierra Drive) – Three Rivers, Sequoia Park, Lemon Cove	
1.000 mi = 1.609 km; 1.000 km = 0.621 mi
