= Ballico, California =

Ballico
- Census-designated place
- Location in Merced County, California

- Location within California Location within the United States
- Coordinates: 37°27′16″N 120°42′22″W
- Country: United States
- State: California
- County: Merced County

Area
  - Total: 3.02 sq mi (7.8 km^{2})
  - Land: 3.02 sq mi (7.8 km^{2})
  - Water: 0.00 sq mi (0 km^{2}) 0%
- Elevation: 151 ft (46 m)

Population (2020)
  - Total: 347
  - Density: 114.8/sq mi (44.33/km^{2})
- Time zone: UTC-8 (Pacific (PST))
  - Summer (DST): UTC-7 (PDT)
- ZIP Code: 95303
- Area code: 209
- GNIS feature IDs: 1655810; 2582939

Ballico is a census-designated place in Merced County, California, United States. It is located 9 miles (14 km) northwest of Atwater at an elevation of 151 feet (46 m). The population was 347 at the 2020 United States census, down from 406 in 2010.

Ballico is located in the northern part of Merced County, just north of where the Santa Fe railroad (the original San Francisco and San Joaquin Valley Railroad line) crosses the Merced River. Delhi is to the west, Denair to the northwest, and Cressey is across the river to the southeast. The ZIP Code is 95303. The community is inside area code 209.

The name is a portmanteau of Ballantine Company, owner of the ranch on which the town was built.

== Geography ==
According to the United States Census Bureau, the CDP covers an area of 3.0 square miles (7.8 km^{2}), all land.

== Demographics ==
Historical population
Census	Pop.	Note	%±
2010	406		—
2020	347		−14.5%
U.S. Decennial Census; 1850–1870 1880-1890; 1900 1910 1920; 1930 1940 1950; 1960 1970 1980; 1990 2000 2010

=== 2020 census ===
As of the 2020 census, Ballico had a population of 347. The population density was 114.8 inhabitants per square mile (44.3/km^{2}). The median age was 32.9 years. The age distribution was 25.6% under the age of 18, 12.1% aged 18 to 24, 23.6% aged 25 to 44, 27.4% aged 45 to 64, and 11.2% who were 65 years of age or older. For every 100 females there were 99.4 males, and for every 100 females age 18 and over there were 100.0 males age 18 and over.

0.0% of residents lived in urban areas, while 100.0% lived in rural areas.

There were 118 households in Ballico, of which 50.0% had children under the age of 18 living in them. Of all households, 57.6% were married-couple households, 7.6% were cohabiting couple households, 14.4% were households with a male householder and no spouse or partner present, and 20.3% were households with a female householder and no spouse or partner present. About 11.8% of all households were made up of individuals and 5.9% had someone living alone who was 65 years of age or older. The average household size was 2.94. There were 100 families (84.7% of all households).

There were 119 housing units, of which 0.8% were vacant. Of occupied housing units, 58.5% were owner-occupied and 41.5% were renter-occupied. The homeowner vacancy rate was 0.0% and the rental vacancy rate was 0.0%.

Racial composition as of the 2020 census
Race	Number	Percent
White	176	50.7%
Black or African American	1	0.3%
American Indian and Alaska Native	17	4.9%
Asian	15	4.3%
Native Hawaiian and Other Pacific Islander	0	0.0%
Some other race	72	20.7%
Two or more races	66	19.0%
Hispanic or Latino (of any race)	175	50.4%

=== 2010 census ===
Ballico first appeared as a census designated place in the 2010 U.S. census.

== Government ==
=== Local ===
The Turlock Irrigation District provides irrigation water and electrical service. Ballico and Cressey share an elementary school district.

=== State and federal ===
In the California State Legislature, Ballico is in the 4th senatorial district, represented by Republican Marie Alvarado-Gil, and in the 22nd Assembly district, represented by Republican Juan Alanis.

In the United States House of Representatives, Ballico is in California's 13th congressional district, represented by Democrat Adam Gray.
