= Hughson, California =

City in California, United States

City of Hughson
- City
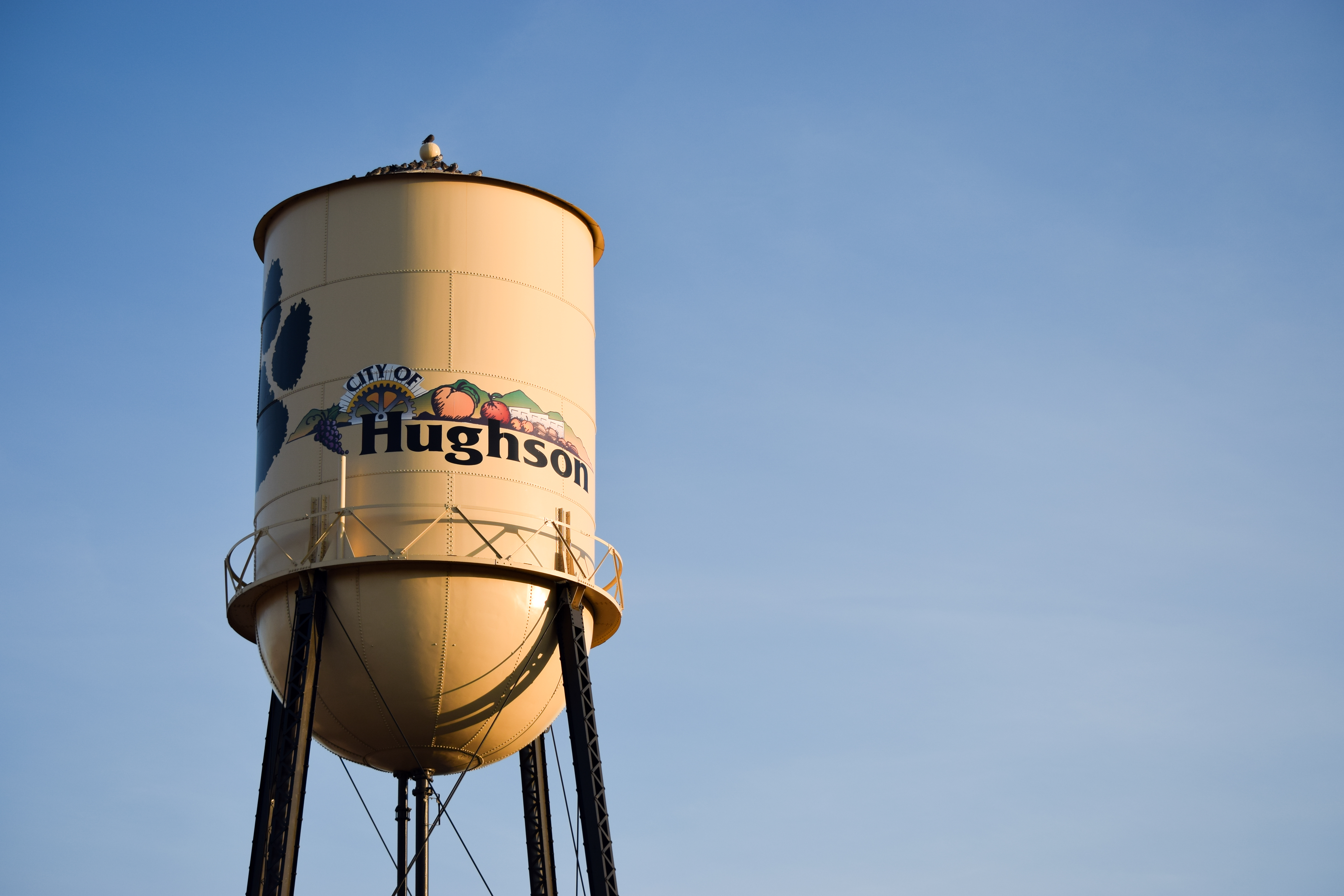
- "Welcome to Hughson" utility tank

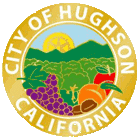
- Seal
- Motto: A Small Community, with a Big Heart!
- Interactive map of City of Hughson
- Location in the United States
- Coordinates: 37°36′11″N 120°52′1″W
- Country: United States
- State: California
- County: Stanislaus
- Incorporated: December 9, 1972

Area
  - Total: 1.91 sq mi (4.94 km^{2})
  - Land: 1.91 sq mi (4.94 km^{2})
  - Water: 0 sq mi (0.00 km^{2}) 0%
- Elevation: 125 ft (38 m)

Population (2020)
  - Total: 7,481
  - Density: 3,920/sq mi (1,514/km^{2})
- Time zone: UTC-8 (Pacific (PST))
  - Summer (DST): UTC-7 (PDT)
- ZIP code: 95326
- Area code: 209
- FIPS code: 06-34904
- GNIS feature ID: 1656082
- Website: www.hughson.org

Hughson is a city in Stanislaus County, California, United States. It is part of the Modesto Metropolitan Statistical Area. The population was 7,481 at the 2020 census, up from 6,640 at the 2010 census.

== History ==
In 1882, Hiram Hughson arrived in the area east of Ceres and north of Denair, California, purchasing land and eventually owning 5,000 acres. In recognition of his holdings, the San Joaquin Railroad named their local stop "Hughson" in the early 1900s. In 1907, Hiram Hughson and neighboring landowner John Tully opened up their land for settlement. As new inhabitants arrived, the area became known as Hughson Township. On December 9, 1972, Hughson was incorporated as a city.

== History of farming ==
Hughson is surrounded by orchards and has been a long-time farming community. Initially, it was known for its enormous production of peaches, which garnered the area the title "The Peach Capital of the World". Peaches are no longer the primary crop in the area and have been replaced for the most part by almond trees. Almond production in the area is one of the largest in the world. Other crops grown in Hughson include walnuts, nectarines, cherries, apples, and the occasional vineyard.

In recent years, many orchards have been torn down due to development.

== Geography ==
Hughson is located at 37°36′11″N 120°52′1″W (37.603082, -120.866838).

According to the United States Census Bureau, the city has a total area of 1.9 square miles (4.9 km^{2}), all land.

== Demographics ==
Historical population
Census	Pop.	Note	%±
1960	1,898		—
1970	2,144		13.0%
1980	2,943		37.3%
1990	3,259		10.7%
2000	3,980		22.1%
2010	6,640		66.8%
2020	7,481		12.7%
U.S. Decennial Census

As of July 1, 2024, the United States Census Bureau estimated the population of Hughson was 7,903.

=== 2020 census ===
As of the 2020 census, Hughson had a population of 7,481 and a population density of 3,925.0 inhabitants per square mile (1,515.5/km^{2}). The median age was 35.6 years. The age distribution was 27.9% under the age of 18, 9.1% aged 18 to 24, 25.8% aged 25 to 44, 22.4% aged 45 to 64, and 14.9% aged 65 or older. For every 100 females, there were 95.9 males, and for every 100 females age 18 and over, there were 91.6 males age 18 and over.

The census reported that 99.7% of the population lived in households, 0.3% lived in non-institutionalized group quarters, and no one was institutionalized. In total, 99.3% of residents lived in urban areas and 0.7% lived in rural areas.

There were 2,393 households, of which 44.9% had children under the age of 18 living in them. Of all households, 56.8% were married-couple households, 6.4% were cohabiting couple households, 12.9% had a male householder with no spouse or partner present, and 23.8% had a female householder with no spouse or partner present. About 18.3% of households were made up of individuals, and 13.0% had someone living alone who was 65 years of age or older. The average household size was 3.12. There were 1,839 families (76.8% of all households).

There were 2,486 housing units at an average density of 1,304.3 units per square mile (503.6 units/km^{2}), of which 2,393 (96.3%) were occupied. Of the occupied units, 69.1% were owner-occupied and 30.9% were occupied by renters. Of all housing units, 3.7% were vacant. The homeowner vacancy rate was 1.3% and the rental vacancy rate was 6.1%.

Racial composition as of the 2020 census
Race	Number	Percent
White	4,274	57.1%
Black or African American	55	0.7%
American Indian and Alaska Native	138	1.8%
Asian	122	1.6%
Native Hawaiian and Other Pacific Islander	8	0.1%
Some other race	1,514	20.2%
Two or more races	1,370	18.3%
Hispanic or Latino (of any race)	3,367	45.0%

=== 2010 census ===
At the 2010 census, Hughson had a population of 6,640. The population density was 3,658.0 inhabitants per square mile (1,412.4/km^{2}). The racial makeup of Hughson was 5,125 (77.2%) White, 55 (0.8%) African American, 74 (1.1%) Native American, 97 (1.5%) Asian, 13 (0.2%) Pacific Islander, 982 (14.8%) from other races, and 294 (4.4%) from two or more races. Hispanic or Latino people of any race were 2,871 persons (43.2%).

The census reported that 6,621 people (99.7% of the population) lived in households, 17 (0.3%) lived in non-institutionalized group quarters, and 2 (0%) were institutionalized.

There were 2,069 households, 994 (48.0%) had children under the age of 18 living in them, 1,258 (60.8%) were opposite-sex married couples living together, 260 (12.6%) had a female householder with no husband present, 110 (5.3%) had a male householder with no wife present. There were 103 (5.0%) unmarried opposite-sex partnerships, and 20 (1.0%) same-sex married couples or partnerships. 367 households (17.7%) were one person and 219 (10.6%) had someone living alone who was 65 or older. The average household size was 3.20. There were 1,628 families (78.7% of households); the average family size was 3.64.

The age distribution was 2,024 people (30.5%) under the age of 18, 678 people (10.2%) aged 18 to 24, 1,784 people (26.9%) aged 25 to 44, 1,438 people (21.7%) aged 45 to 64, and 716 people (10.8%) who were 65 or older. The median age was 32.8 years. For every 100 females, there were 93.8 males. For every 100 females age 18 and over, there were 91.9 males.

There were 2,234 housing units at an average density of 1,230.7 per square mile, of the occupied units 1,388 (67.1%) were owner-occupied and 681 (32.9%) were rented. The homeowner vacancy rate was 1.5%; the rental vacancy rate was 13.1%. 4,558 people (68.6% of the population) lived in owner-occupied housing units and 2,063 people (31.1%) lived in rental housing units.

== Politics ==
In the California State Legislature, Hughson is in the 4th senatorial district, represented by Republican Marie Alvarado-Gil, and in the 9th Assembly district, represented by Republican Heath Flora.

In the United States House of Representatives, Hughson is in California's 5th congressional district, represented by Republican Tom McClintock.

Thom Crowder, Doug Humphreys, and Ben Manley were recalled from the city council in a special election held on August 24, 2010.

== Education ==
Hughson High School and Emilie J. Ross Middle School serve the students of Hughson and surrounding communities.

The Hughson Huskies football team claimed victory in the 1997 State Championships via Cal-Hi sports before CIF state Championships came along in 2007. Cal-Hi Sports would rank each individual high school's sports teams for each division throughout the state of California. Hughson Huskies were CIF San Jouquin Division 3 Title holders in 1991, 1992, 1997, and 2000. The Huskies were Trans Valley League Champions in 1969, 1973, 1977, 1992, 1994, 1995, 1996, 1997, and 1998.

== Media ==
The Hughson Chronicle, a newspaper with a general circulation of around 4,200, covers the City of Hughson and surrounding rural areas.

Valley Entertainment Monthly, a regional entertainment newspaper published in the 1990s, maintained its mailing address in Hughson and was available in a number of the city's shops and restaurants.
