= Cressey, California =

- Census designated place
- Location in California
- Coordinates: 37°25′11″N 120°40′03″W
- Country: United States
- State: California
- County: Merced

Area
  - Total: 1.76 sq mi (4.55 km^{2})
  - Land: 1.76 sq mi (4.55 km^{2})
  - Water: 0 sq mi (0.00 km^{2}) 0%
- Elevation: 167 ft (51 m)

Population (2020)
  - Total: 366
  - Density: 208.1/sq mi (80.36/km^{2})
- Time zone: UTC-8 (Pacific)
  - Summer (DST): UTC-7 (PDT)
- ZIP code: 95312
- Area code: 209
- FIPS code: 06-17078
- GNIS feature IDs: 221824, 2582986

Cressey (formerly Cressy) is a census-designated place in Merced County, California, United States. It is located 6 miles (9.7 km) north-northwest of Atwater, at an elevation of 167 feet (51 m). The population was 366 at the 2020 United States census, down from 393 in 2010.

Cressey is located in the northern part of Merced County. It is just east of where the Santa Fe railroad (the original line of the San Francisco and San Joaquin Valley Railroad) crosses the Merced River. Ballico is across the river to the northwest. Livingston is to the southwest, and Winton is southeast of Cressey. The ZIP Code is 95312. The area is served by area code 209.

== History ==
The Cressy post office opened in 1882, closed in 1883, re-opened in 1909, and changed its name to Cressey in 1912. The town was named by the Atchison, Topeka and Santa Fe Railway for Calvin J. Cressey, local landowner.

Cressey is patrolled by the Merced County Sheriffs Office.

Cressey has one elementary school (Ballico-Cressey School District, K-2).

== Geography ==
According to the United States Census Bureau, the CDP covers an area of 1.8 square miles (4.6 km^{2}), all land.

To the north of Cressey, beyond the Merced River, it is considered Ballico. To the south of Cressey, Palm Avenue and beyond, it is considered Winton. To the west of Cressey, over the Santa Fe Rail Road and beyond, it is considered Livingston. To the east of Cressey, off of Cressey Way onto Meadow Drive and beyond, it is considered Winton as well.

== Demographics ==
Historical population
Census	Pop.	Note	%±
2010	394		—
2020	366		−7.1%
U.S. Decennial Census; 1850–1870 1880-1890; 1900 1910 1920; 1930 1940 1950; 1960 1970 1980; 1990 2000 2010

Cressey first appeared as a census designated place in the 2010 U.S. census.

The 2020 United States census reported that Cressey had a population of 366. The population density was 208.2 inhabitants per square mile (80.4/km^{2}). The racial makeup of Cressey was 182 (49.7%) White, 1 (0.3%) African American, 12 (3.3%) Native American, 13 (3.6%) Asian, 0 (0.0%) Pacific Islander, 101 (27.6%) from other races, and 57 (15.6%) from two or more races. Hispanic or Latino of any race were 206 persons (56.3%).

The whole population lived in households. There were 115 households, out of which 43 (37.4%) had children under the age of 18 living in them, 72 (62.6%) were married-couple households, 5 (4.3%) were cohabiting couple households, 15 (13.0%) had a female householder with no partner present, and 23 (20.0%) had a male householder with no partner present. 15 households (13.0%) were one person, and 14 (12.2%) were one person aged 65 or older. The average household size was 3.18. There were 97 families (84.3% of all households).

The age distribution was 118 people (32.2%) under the age of 18, 26 people (7.1%) aged 18 to 24, 81 people (22.1%) aged 25 to 44, 90 people (24.6%) aged 45 to 64, and 51 people (13.9%) who were 65 years of age or older. The median age was 33.0 years. For every 100 females, there were 93.7 males.

There were 117 housing units at an average density of 66.6 units per square mile (25.7 units/km^{2}), of which 115 (98.3%) were occupied. Of these, 68 (59.1%) were owner-occupied, and 47 (40.9%) were occupied by renters.

== Government ==
=== Local ===
The Merced Irrigation District provides irrigation water.

Ballico and Cressey share an elementary school district. Most Cressey students continue to Livingston High School in the Merced Union High School District.

Fire protection is provided by Cal Fire under contract to Merced County Fire Department. Station 64 is staffed with one career fire officer each shift, and local volunteers.

Merced County Sheriffs Department is the patrol for this unincorporated area.

=== State and federal ===
In the California State Legislature, Cressey is in the 4th senatorial district, represented by Republican Marie Alvarado-Gil, and in the 27th Assembly district, represented by Democrat Esmeralda Soria.

In the United States House of Representatives, Cressey is in California's 13th congressional district, represented by Democrat Adam Gray.
