= Hickman, California =

Hickman
- Unincorporated Community; Census Designated Place
- Location in Stanislaus County and the state of California
- Coordinates: 37°37′27″N 120°45′28″W
- Country: United States
- State: California
- County: Stanislaus

Area
  - Total: 0.351 sq mi (0.908 km^{2})
  - Land: 0.351 sq mi (0.908 km^{2})
  - Water: 0 sq mi (0 km^{2}) 0%
- Elevation: 177 ft (54 m)

Population (2020)
  - Total: 604
  - Density: 1,720/sq mi (665/km^{2})
- Time zone: UTC-8 (Pacific (PST))
  - Summer (DST): UTC-7 (PDT)
- ZIP code: 95323
- Area code: 209
- FIPS code: 06-33504
- GNIS feature ID: 1656069

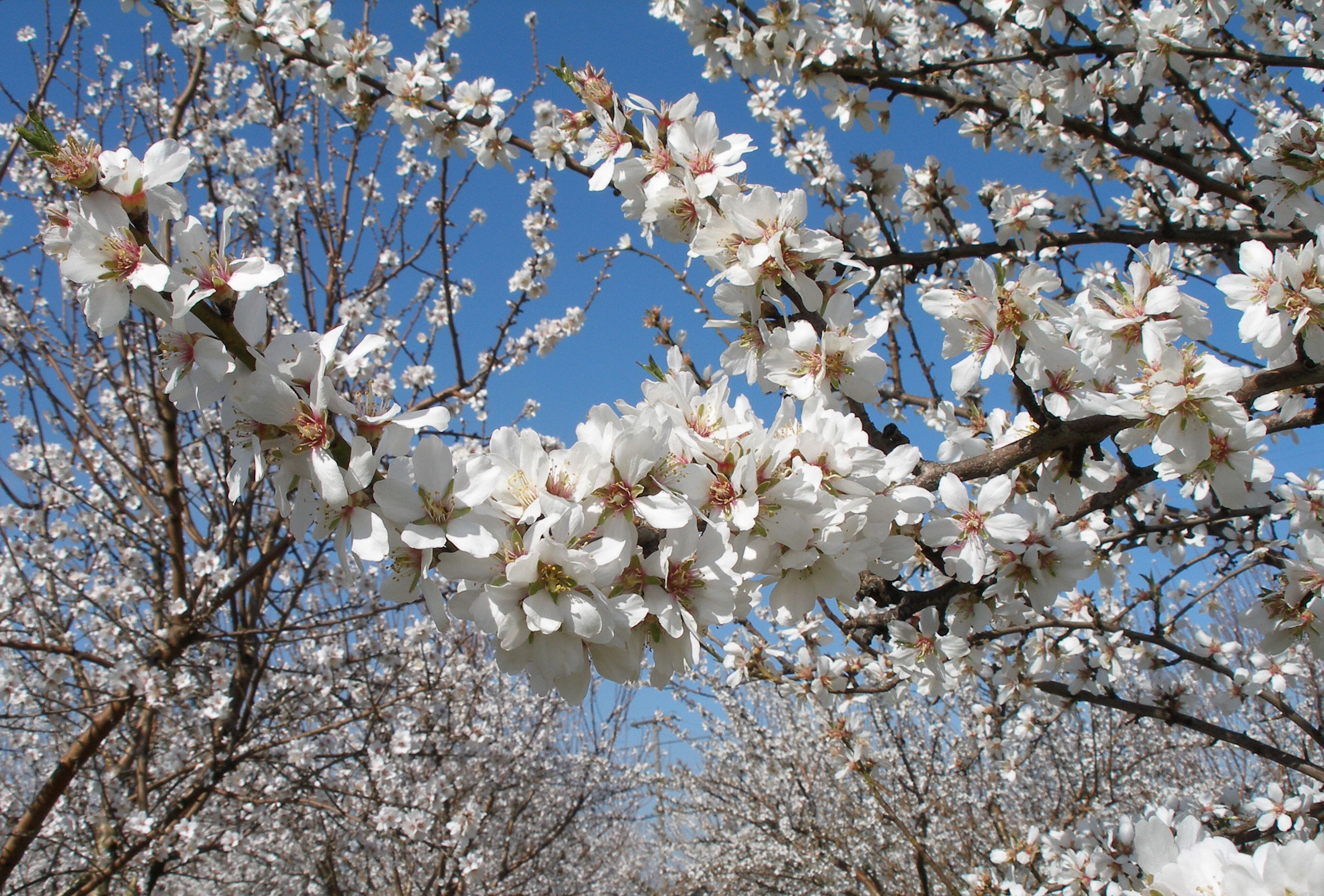
Hickman Almond Blossoms in Spring

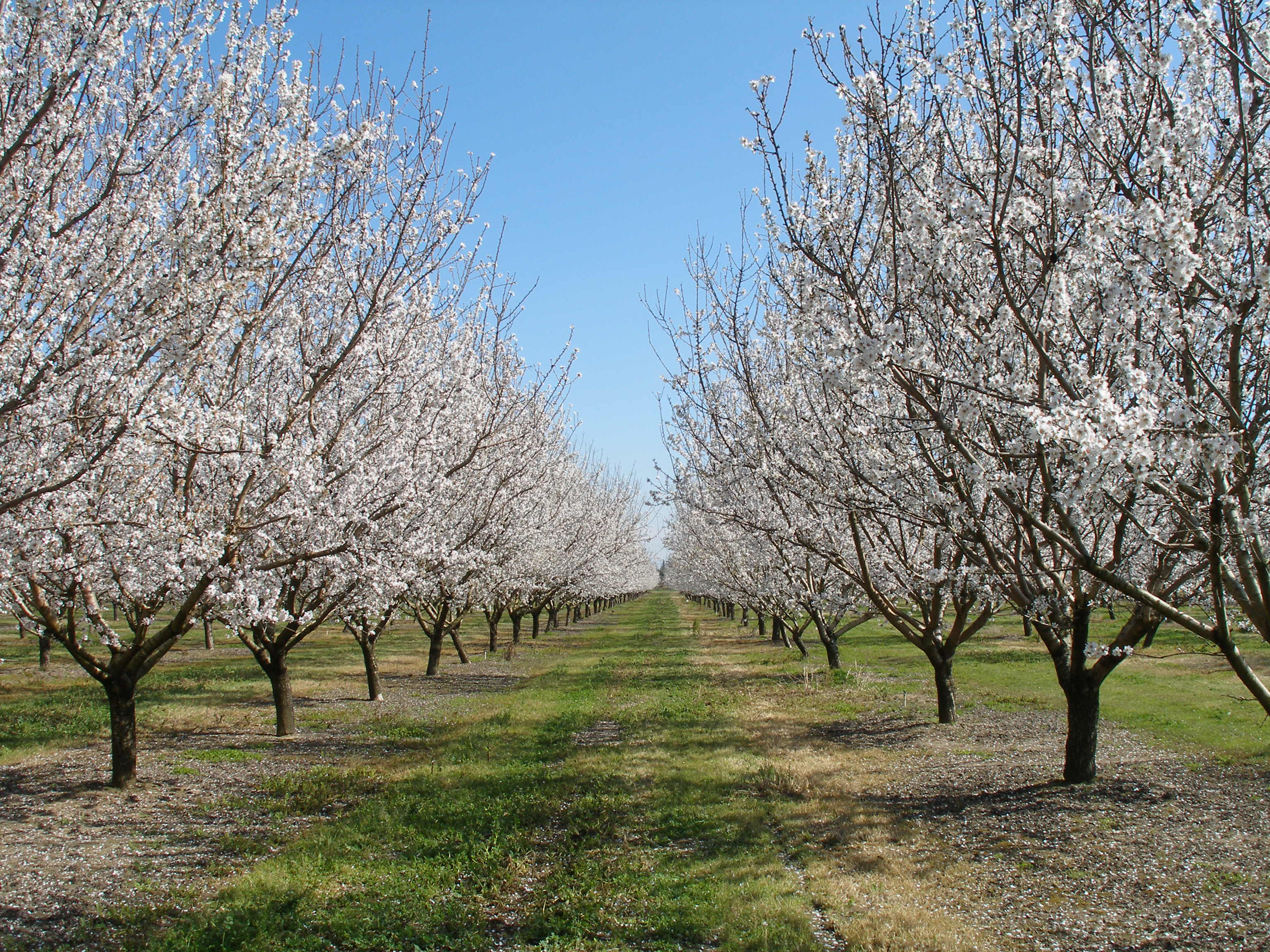
Hickman Almond Orchard in the Spring

Hickman is a census-designated place (CDP) in Stanislaus County, California, United States. The population was 604 at the 2020 census, down from 641 at the 2010 census. It is part of the Modesto Metropolitan Statistical Area. Its history dates back to the goldrush era, and was once was a stop on a rail line (the old train stop still stands). KLOC broadcasts from three radio towers in Hickman.

== History ==
The first major settler of Hickman was Charles Dallas in either 1849 or 1850, and early maps even referred to the area as "Dallas". Dallas' daughter Mary married Louis McLean Hickman on February 1, 1860. Hickman served as mayor of nearby Stockton, California in 1869. In the 1860s Hickman owned a hardware store and 11,000 acre ranch where he grew grain, hay, olives, figs, oranges, grapes and other fruits. The advent of the railroad in 1891 led to large brick grain storage buildings. Hickman was renamed in 1891 by the Southern Pacific for Louis Hickman.

== Local life ==
Hickman social life revolves around its school. Hickman Charter school district is a K-8 school district. After 8th grade, students can commute to one of the many local schools. Hickman Charter School has more students than native population and has attendance from students as far as Berkeley, California.

== Commerce ==
Hickman is a country town, and the most obvious form of income is agriculture. Almond orchards are plentiful, and there are several dairies. Foster Farms operates a dairy as well as several poultry farms, and there is a wholesale nursery raising trees, especially decorative trees like redwoods. A large rooster farm reputedly sells fighting cocks (although using such birds in fighting is illegal). There are also other forms of industry, including a multi-national mining equipment company, large nursery, a welding shop, two country stores, a cabinet maker, a music education company and Hickman Hat Rack Co.

== Hydroelectric Dam on the Canal ==
Hickman has an unusual hydro-electric dam on one of its irrigation canals.

== Geography ==
Hickman is located at 37°37′27″N 120°45′28″W (37.624065, -120.757817).

According to the United States Census Bureau, the CDP has a total area of 0.35 square miles (0.91 km^{2}), all land. At the 2010 census, the CDP was larger with a land area of 1.08 square miles (2.8 km^{2}).

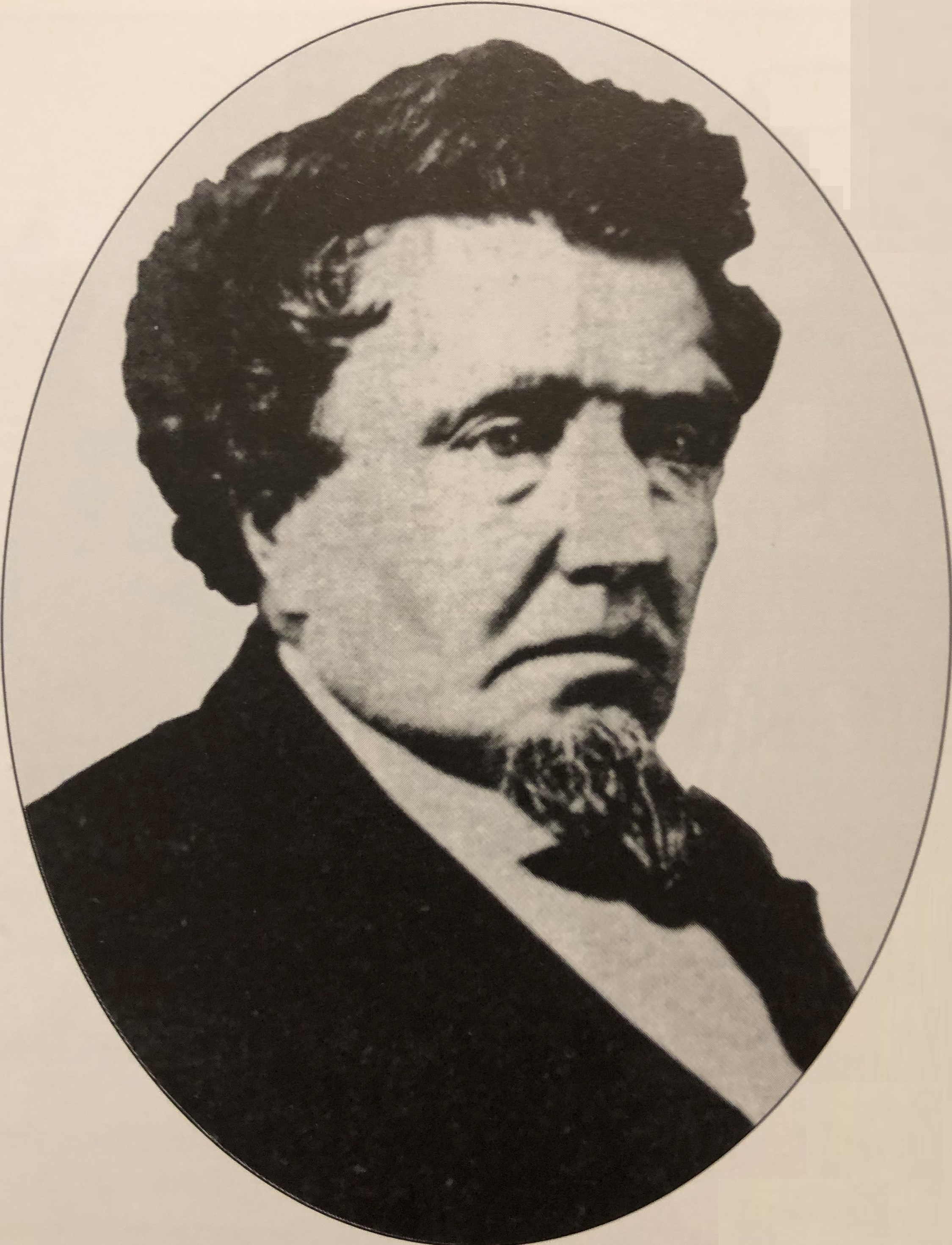
Charles Dallas, first major settler of Hickman

== Demographics ==
Historical population
Census	Pop.	Note	%±
2000	457		—
2010	641		40.3%
2020	604		−5.8%
U.S. Decennial Census; 1860–1870 1880-1890; 1900 1910 1920; 1930 1940 1950; 1960 1970 1980; 1990 2000 2010

Hickman first appeared as a census designated place in the 2000 U.S. census.

=== 2010 ===
The 2010 United States census reported that Hickman had a population of 641. The population density was 591.0 inhabitants per square mile (228.2/km^{2}). The racial makeup of Hickman was 503 (78.5%) White, 1 (0.2%) African American, 15 (2.3%) Native American, 4 (0.6%) Asian, 0 (0.0%) Pacific Islander, 98 (15.3%) from other races, and 20 (3.1%) from two or more races. Hispanic or Latino of any race were 180 persons (28.1%).

The Census reported that 641 people (100% of the population) lived in households, 0 (0%) lived in non-institutionalized group quarters, and 0 (0%) were institutionalized.

There were 193 households, out of which 84 (43.5%) had children under the age of 18 living in them, 119 (61.7%) were opposite-sex married couples living together, 22 (11.4%) had a female householder with no husband present, 19 (9.8%) had a male householder with no wife present. There were 8 (4.1%) unmarried opposite-sex partnerships, and 2 (1.0%) same-sex married couples or partnerships. 23 households (11.9%) were made up of individuals, and 9 (4.7%) had someone living alone who was 65 years of age or older. The average household size was 3.32. There were 160 families (82.9% of all households); the average family size was 3.64.

The population was spread out, with 176 people (27.5%) under the age of 18, 64 people (10.0%) aged 18 to 24, 158 people (24.6%) aged 25 to 44, 174 people (27.1%) aged 45 to 64, and 69 people (10.8%) who were 65 years of age or older. The median age was 35.2 years. For every 100 females, there were 104.1 males. For every 100 females age 18 and over, there were 101.3 males.

There were 203 housing units at an average density of 187.2 per square mile (72.3/km^{2}), of which 141 (73.1%) were owner-occupied, and 52 (26.9%) were occupied by renters. The homeowner vacancy rate was 2.7%; the rental vacancy rate was 3.7%. 459 people (71.6% of the population) lived in owner-occupied housing units and 182 people (28.4%) lived in rental housing units.

=== 2000 ===
As of the census of 2000, there were 457 people, 139 households, and 116 families residing in the CDP. The population density was 360.3 inhabitants per square mile (139.1/km^{2}). There were 148 housing units at an average density of 116.7 per square mile (45.1/km^{2}). The racial makeup of the CDP was 84.46% White, 1.53% Native American, 0.22% Asian, 9.19% from other races, and 4.60% from two or more races. Hispanic or Latino of any race were 18.38% of the population.

There were 139 households, out of which 38.8% had children under the age of 18 living with them, 67.6% were married couples living together, 11.5% had a female householder with no husband present, and 16.5% were non-families. 12.9% of all households were made up of individuals, and 2.9% had someone living alone who was 65 years of age or older. The average household size was 3.29 and the average family size was 3.55.

In the CDP, the population was spread out, with 30.4% under the age of 18, 9.8% from 18 to 24, 29.1% from 25 to 44, 19.5% from 45 to 64, and 11.2% who were 65 years of age or older. The median age was 34 years. For every 100 females, there were 109.6 males. For every 100 females age 18 and over, there were 101.3 males.

The median income for a household in the CDP was $33,333, and the median income for a family was $34,583. Males had a median income of $41,250 versus $21,618 for females. The per capita income for the CDP was $16,693. About 13.3% of families and 21.1% of the population were below the poverty line, including 40.4% of those under age 18 and 9.8% of those age 65 or over.

== Government ==
In the California State Legislature, Hickman is in the 4th senatorial district, represented by Republican Marie Alvarado-Gil, and the 9th Assembly district, represented by Republican Heath Flora.

In the United States House of Representatives, Hickman is in California's 5th congressional district, represented by Republican Tom McClintock.
