= Riverbank Army Ammunition Plant =

Coordinates: 37°43′05″N 120°54′53″W

- Stanislaus County, California, USA
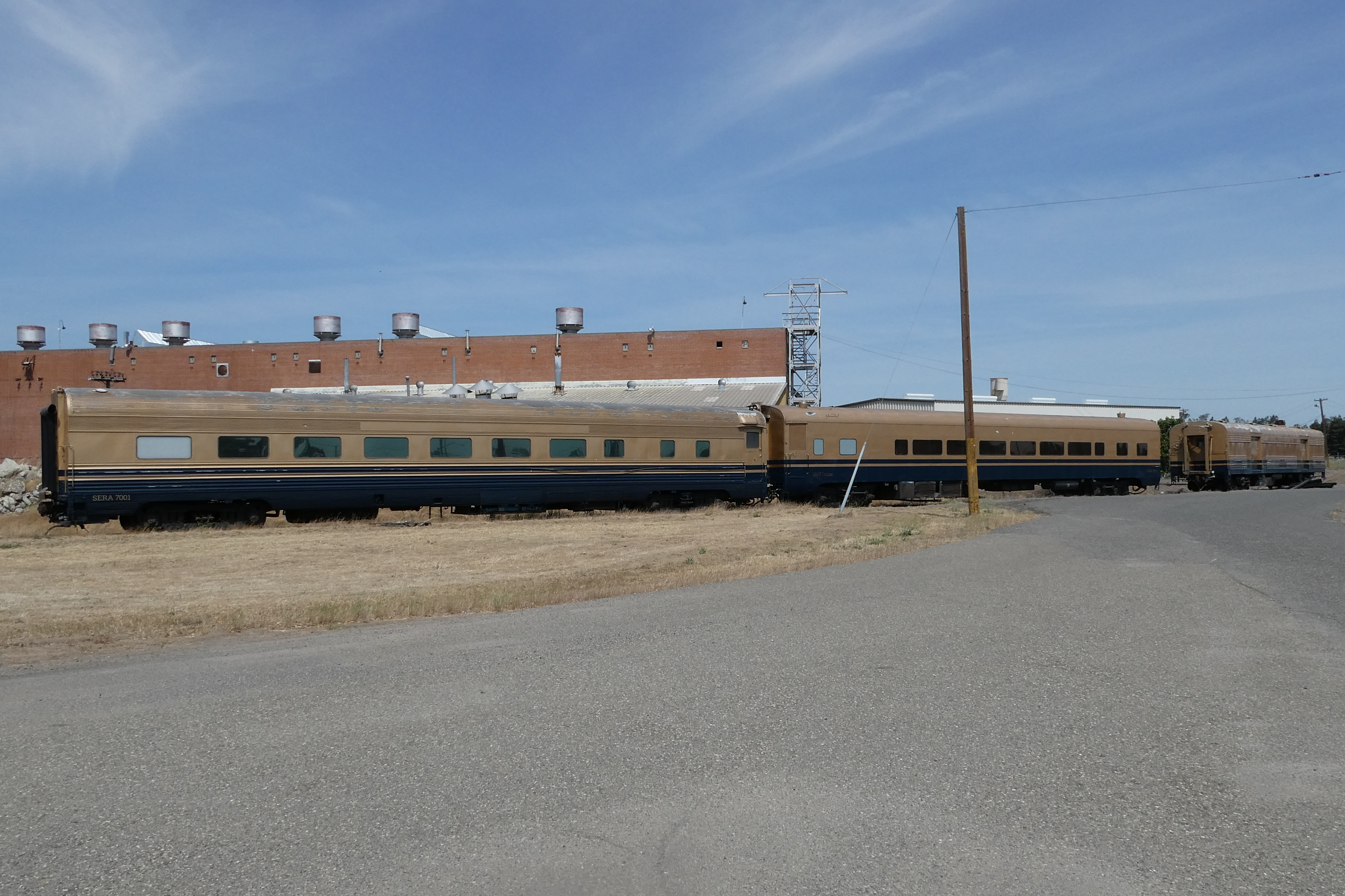
- Sierra Northern Railway cars stored at the former plant in 2022

Site information
- Type: Ammunition Plant
- Owner: United States Army

Site history
- Built: 1942
- In use: 1942-1944, 1951-1958 1966-1981

Riverbank Army Ammunition Plant is located just outside Riverbank, California, in Stanislaus County. The facility was built in 1942 as an aluminum reduction plant operated by Alcoa producing 48,000 tons per year for World War II aircraft manufacture until 1944. It was reactivated in 1951 for the Korean War and was the United States' largest producer of steel cartridge cases until 1958. It reopened in 1966 manufacturing mortar shells and projectiles for the Vietnam War and remained in production until 1981. The facility includes 192 buildings on 172 acres (0.70 km^{2}).

In 2005, the 2005 Base Realignment and Closure Commission recommended that the base be closed and its functions transferred to Rock Island Arsenal. The Riverbank Local Redevelopment Authority assumed responsibility for the site in 2010.

In 2022, Aemetis acquired a 24-acre Site in Riverbank, California, for carbon capture and sequestration injection wells. Part of the 125-acre Riverbank Industrial Complex, the site is planned for the annual permanent sequestration of 1 million metric tonnes of carbon dioxide from industrial and agricultural sources. Aemetis has a mission to transform renewable energy with below zero carbon intensity transportation fuels. Aemetis has launched the Carbon Zero production process to decarbonize the transportation sector using today's infrastructure.
