= Terra Bella, California =

Terra Bella
- census-designated place
- Nickname: Tierras
- Location in Tulare County and the state of California

- Location in the United States
- Coordinates: 35°57′41″N 119°2′27″W
- Country: United States
- State: California
- County: Tulare

Area
  - Total: 2.188 sq mi (5.668 km^{2})
  - Land: 2.188 sq mi (5.668 km^{2})
  - Water: 0 sq mi (0 km^{2}) 0%
- Elevation: 486 ft (148 m)

Population (2020)
  - Total: 2,910
  - Density: 1,330/sq mi (513/km^{2})
- Time zone: UTC-8 (Pacific (PST))
  - Summer (DST): UTC-7 (PDT)
- ZIP code: 93270
- Area code: 559
- FIPS code: 06-78288
- GNIS feature ID: 1652800

Terra Bella is a census-designated place (CDP) in Tulare County, California, United States. The population was 2,910 at the 2020 census, down from 3,310 at the 2010 census.

== Geography ==
Terra Bella is located at 35°57′41″N 119°2′27″W (35.961292, -119.040914).

According to the United States Census Bureau, the CDP has a total area of 2.2 square miles (5.7 km^{2}), all land.

The community is served by the Terra Bella Irrigation District.

== Demographics ==
Historical population
Census	Pop.	Note	%±
1970	1,037		—
1980	1,807		74.3%
1990	2,740		51.6%
2000	3,466		26.5%
2010	3,310		−4.5%
2020	2,910		−12.1%
U.S. Decennial Census; 1860–1870 1880-1890; 1900 1910 1920; 1930 1940 1950; 1960 1970 1980; 1990 2000 2010

Terra Bull first appeared as a census designated place in the 1960 U.S. census; and as a census designated place in the 1980 U.S. census.

=== 2020 census ===
As of the 2020 census, Terra Bella had a population of 2,910 and a population density of 1,329.4 inhabitants per square mile (513.3/km^{2}).

The census reported that 99.8% of the population lived in households, 0.2% lived in non-institutionalized group quarters, and no one was institutionalized. The median age was 29.2 years. The age distribution was 32.4% under the age of 18, 12.1% aged 18 to 24, 25.1% aged 25 to 44, 20.4% aged 45 to 64, and 10.1% who were 65 years of age or older. For every 100 females, there were 104.9 males, and for every 100 females age 18 and over there were 102.3 males age 18 and over. The census also reported that 0.0% of residents lived in urban areas and 100.0% lived in rural areas.

There were 721 households, out of which 54.4% had children under the age of 18 living in them. Of all households, 59.5% were married-couple households, 6.4% were cohabiting couple households, 21.4% had a female householder with no spouse or partner present, and 12.8% had a male householder with no spouse or partner present. About 12.1% of households were one person, and 4.9% were one person aged 65 or older. The average household size was 4.03. There were 616 families (85.4% of all households).

There were 757 housing units at an average density of 345.8 units per square mile (133.5 units/km^{2}), of which 721 (95.2%) were occupied. Of occupied units, 47.3% were owner-occupied and 52.7% were occupied by renters. Of all housing units, 4.8% were vacant. The homeowner vacancy rate was 2.3% and the rental vacancy rate was 2.3%.

Racial composition as of the 2020 census
Race	Number	Percent
White	650	22.3%
Black or African American	4	0.1%
American Indian and Alaska Native	70	2.4%
Asian	66	2.3%
Native Hawaiian and Other Pacific Islander	2	0.1%
Some other race	1,479	50.8%
Two or more races	639	22.0%
Hispanic or Latino (of any race)	2,639	90.7%

=== Income and poverty ===
In 2023, the US Census Bureau estimated that the median household income was $62,073, and the per capita income was $27,456. About 19.0% of families and 17.6% of the population were below the poverty line.

=== 2010 census ===
The 2010 United States census reported that Terra Bella had a population of 3,310. The population density was 1,216.6 inhabitants per square mile (469.7/km^{2}). The racial makeup of Terra Bella was 1,426 (43.1%) White, 5 (0.2%) African American, 20 (0.6%) Native American, 75 (2.3%) Asian, 2 (0.1%) Pacific Islander, 1,733 (52.4%) from other races, and 49 (1.5%) from two or more races. Hispanic or Latino of any race were 2,894 persons (87.4%).

The Census reported that 3,301 people (99.7% of the population) lived in households, 9 (0.3%) lived in non-institutionalized group quarters, and 0 (0%) were institutionalized.

There were 787 households, out of which 510 (64.8%) had children under the age of 18 living in them, 521 (66.2%) were opposite-sex married couples living together, 93 (11.8%) had a female householder with no husband present, 78 (9.9%) had a male householder with no wife present. There were 73 (9.3%) unmarried opposite-sex partnerships, and 10 (1.3%) same-sex married couples or partnerships. 65 households (8.3%) were made up of individuals, and 25 (3.2%) had someone living alone who was 65 years of age or older. The average household size was 4.19. There were 692 families (87.9% of all households); the average family size was 4.41.

The population age distribution is 1,256 people (37.9%) under the age of 18, 344 people (10.4%) aged 18 to 24, 926 people (28.0%) aged 25 to 44, 564 people (17.0%) aged 45 to 64, and 220 people (6.6%) who were 65 years of age or older. The median age was 26.1 years. For every 100 females, there were 104.6 males. For every 100 females age 18 and over, there were 105.8 males.

There were 824 housing units at an average density of 302.9 units per square mile (117.0 units/km^{2}), of which 381 (48.4%) were owner-occupied, and 406 (51.6%) were occupied by renters. The homeowner vacancy rate was 1.0%; the rental vacancy rate was 3.8%. 1,627 people (49.2% of the population) lived in owner-occupied housing units and 1,674 people (50.6%) lived in rental housing units.

== Politics ==
In the state legislature Terra Bella is located in the 16th senatorial district, represented by Democrat Melissa Hurtado, and in the 33rd Assembly district, represented by Republican Alexandra Macedo.

In the United States House of Representatives, Terra Bella is in California's 22nd congressional district, represented by Republican David Valadao

== Education ==
The CDP is served by the Terra Bella Union Elementary School District and the Porterville Unified School District for grades 9–12.
