= Ivanhoe, California =

Ivanhoe
- Census designated place
- Location in Tulare County and the state of California

- Location in the United States
- Coordinates: 36°23′16″N 119°13′9″W
- Country: United States
- State: California
- County: Tulare

Area
  - Total: 1.310 sq mi (3.393 km^{2})
  - Land: 1.310 sq mi (3.393 km^{2})
  - Water: 0 sq mi (0 km^{2}) 0%
- Elevation: 364 ft (111 m)

Population (2020 United States census)
  - Total: 4,468
  - Density: 3,411/sq mi (1,317/km^{2})
- Time zone: UTC-8 (Pacific)
  - Summer (DST): UTC-7 (PDT)
- ZIP code: 93235
- Area code: 559
- FIPS code: 06-36910
- GNIS feature ID: 1652729

Ivanhoe is a census-designated place (CDP) in Tulare County, California, United States. The population was 4,468 at the 2020 census, down from 4,495 at the 2010 census.

== Geography ==
Ivanhoe is located at 36°23′16″N 119°13′9″W (36.387879, -119.219081).

According to the United States Census Bureau, the CDP has a total area of 1.3 square miles (3.4 km^{2}), all land.

=== Climate ===
According to the Köppen Climate Classification system, Ivanhoe has a semi-arid climate, abbreviated "BSk" on climate maps.

== Demographics ==
Historical population
Census	Pop.	Note	%±
1950	1,172		—
1960	1,616		37.9%
1970	1,595		−1.3%
1980	2,684		68.3%
1990	3,293		22.7%
2000	4,474		35.9%
2010	4,495		0.5%
2020	4,468		−0.6%
U.S. Decennial Census; 1860–1870 1880-1890; 1900 1910 1920; 1930 1940 1950; 1960 1970 1980; 1990 2000 2010

Ivanhoe first appeared as an unincorporated place in the 1950 U.S. census; and then as a census designated place in the 1980 U.S. census.

=== 2020 census ===
As of the 2020 census, Ivanhoe had a population of 4,468, with a population density of 3,410.7 inhabitants per square mile (1,316.9/km^{2}). The age distribution was 31.0% under the age of 18, 11.3% aged 18 to 24, 24.2% aged 25 to 44, 22.6% aged 45 to 64, and 10.9% who were 65 years of age or older. The median age was 31.1 years. For every 100 females, there were 100.3 males, and for every 100 females age 18 and over, there were 96.9 males age 18 and over.

The whole population lived in households. There were 1,227 households, out of which 50.9% included children under the age of 18, 50.6% were married-couple households, 8.6% were cohabiting couple households, 24.8% had a female householder with no partner present, and 16.0% had a male householder with no partner present. 13.2% of households were one person, and 4.8% were one person aged 65 or older. The average household size was 3.64. There were 1,024 families (83.5% of all households).

0.0% of residents lived in urban areas, while 100.0% lived in rural areas.

There were 1,279 housing units at an average density of 976.3 units per square mile (377.0 units/km^{2}), of which 1,227 (95.9%) were occupied and 4.1% were vacant. Of occupied units, 53.1% were owner-occupied and 46.9% were occupied by renters. The homeowner vacancy rate was 0.5%, and the rental vacancy rate was 2.0%.

Racial composition as of the 2020 census
Race	Number	Percent
White	1,265	28.3%
Black or African American	13	0.3%
American Indian and Alaska Native	84	1.9%
Asian	44	1.0%
Native Hawaiian and Other Pacific Islander	1	0.0%
Some other race	2,464	55.1%
Two or more races	597	13.4%
Hispanic or Latino (of any race)	3,954	88.5%

=== Income and poverty ===
In 2023, the US Census Bureau estimated that the median household income was $55,108, and the per capita income was $20,443. About 9.2% of families and 10.7% of the population were below the poverty line.

=== 2010 census ===
At the 2010 census Ivanhoe had a population of 4,495. The population density was 2,232.0 inhabitants per square mile (861.8/km^{2}). The racial makeup of Ivanhoe was 2,002 (44.5%) White, 19 (0.4%) African American, 80 (1.8%) Native American, 29 (0.6%) Asian, 1 (0.0%) Pacific Islander, 2,221 (49.4%) from other races, and 143 (3.2%) from two or more races. Hispanic or Latino of any race were 3,752 persons (83.5%).

The whole population lived in households, no one lived in non-institutionalized group quarters and no one was institutionalized.

There were 1,142 households, 684 (59.9%) had children under the age of 18 living in them, 679 (59.5%) were opposite-sex married couples living together, 205 (18.0%) had a female householder with no husband present, 113 (9.9%) had a male householder with no wife present. There were 100 (8.8%) unmarried opposite-sex partnerships, and 6 (0.5%) same-sex married couples or partnerships. 102 households (8.9%) were one person and 44 (3.9%) had someone living alone who was 65 or older. The average household size was 3.94. There were 997 families (87.3% of households); the average family size was 4.14.

The age distribution was 1,564 people (34.8%) under the age of 18, 522 people (11.6%) aged 18 to 24, 1,112 people (24.7%) aged 25 to 44, 975 people (21.7%) aged 45 to 64, and 322 people (7.2%) who were 65 or older. The median age was 27.4 years. For every 100 females, there were 104.9 males. For every 100 females age 18 and over, there were 107.0 males.

There were 1,217 housing units at an average density of 604.3 per square mile, of the occupied units 694 (60.8%) were owner-occupied and 448 (39.2%) were rented. The homeowner vacancy rate was 1.1%; the rental vacancy rate was 7.6%. 2,739 people (60.9% of the population) lived in owner-occupied housing units and 1,756 people (39.1%) lived in rental housing units.

== Government ==
In the California State Legislature, Ivanhoe is in the 16th senatorial district, represented by Democrat Melissa Hurtado, and the 33rd Assembly district, represented by Republican Alexandra Macedo.

In the United States House of Representatives, Ivanhoe is in California's 21st congressional district, represented by Democrat Jim Costa

== Education ==
Ivanhoe is served by the Visalia Unified School District.
