= Denair, California =

Denair
- Census-designated place
- Motto: The Oasis of the San Joaquin Valley
- Location in Stanislaus County and the state of California
- Coordinates: 37°31′39″N 120°47′59″W
- Country: United States
- State: California
- County: Stanislaus

Area
  - Total: 1.64 sq mi (4.25 km^{2})
  - Land: 1.64 sq mi (4.25 km^{2})
  - Water: 0 sq mi (0.00 km^{2}) 0%
- Elevation: 125 ft (38 m)

Population (2020)
  - Total: 4,865
  - Density: 2,962.6/sq mi (1,143.88/km^{2})
- Time zone: UTC-8 (Pacific)
  - Summer (DST): UTC-7 (PDT)
- ZIP code: 95316
- Area code: 209
- FIPS code: 06-18856
- GNIS feature ID: 1655964

Denair is a census-designated place (CDP) in Stanislaus County, California, United States. The population was 4,865 at the 2020 census, up from 4,404 at the 2010 census. It is part of the Modesto Metropolitan Statistical Area.

== History ==
Denair was established in 1904, along the Santa Fe Railroad (once the Valley Division) tracks. The town was renamed from Elmwood Colony to Denair in honor of a local landowner, John Denair.

== Geography ==
Denair is located at 37°31′39″N 120°47′59″W (37.527532, -120.799813).

According to the United States Census Bureau, the CDP has a total area of 1.6 square miles (4.1 km^{2}), all land.

=== Climate ===
Denair has a semi-arid climate with Mediterranean influences, characterized by hot, dry summers and cool winters.

Climate data for Denair 3 NNE, California (1899–1984)
Month	Jan	Feb	Mar	Apr	May	Jun	Jul	Aug	Sep	Oct	Nov	Dec	Year
Mean daily maximum °F (°C)	53.4 (11.9)	60.4 (15.8)	66.1 (18.9)	73.1 (22.8)	81.3 (27.4)	89.2 (31.8)	94.9 (34.9)	92.6 (33.7)	87.4 (30.8)	78.1 (25.6)	65.6 (18.7)	54.6 (12.6)	74.7 (23.7)
Mean daily minimum °F (°C)	35.7 (2.1)	38.6 (3.7)	40.5 (4.7)	43.6 (6.4)	48.6 (9.2)	53.7 (12.1)	57.2 (14.0)	55.8 (13.2)	52.5 (11.4)	45.9 (7.7)	39.0 (3.9)	35.4 (1.9)	45.5 (7.5)
Average precipitation inches (mm)	2.23 (57)	1.98 (50)	2.00 (51)	1.09 (28)	0.39 (9.9)	0.10 (2.5)	0.02 (0.51)	0.04 (1.0)	0.15 (3.8)	0.59 (15)	1.31 (33)	1.94 (49)	11.84 (301)
Average precipitation days (≥ 0.01 in)	7	7	7	4	2	1	0	0	1	2	5	6	42
Source: WRCC

== Demographics ==
Historical population
Census	Pop.	Note	%±
1970	1,128		—
1980	2,892		156.4%
1990	3,693		27.7%
2000	3,446		−6.7%
2010	4,404		27.8%
2020	4,865		10.5%
U.S. Decennial Census; 1970 1980; 1990 2000 2010

=== 2020 census ===
As of the 2020 census, Denair had a population of 4,865 and a population density of 2,962.9 inhabitants per square mile (1,144.0/km^{2}). The median age was 37.0 years. 25.5% of residents were under the age of 18 and 15.1% were 65 years of age or older. For every 100 females, there were 102.9 males, and for every 100 females age 18 and over, there were 100.1 males.

The census reported that 99.8% of the population lived in households, 0.2% lived in non-institutionalized group quarters, and 0.0% were institutionalized. Separately, 98.9% of residents lived in urban areas and 1.1% lived in rural areas.

There were 1,608 households, of which 38.2% had children under the age of 18 living in them. Of all households, 61.2% were married-couple households, 13.7% were households with a male householder and no spouse or partner present, and 19.7% were households with a female householder and no spouse or partner present. About 17.7% of all households were made up of individuals and 10.4% had someone living alone who was 65 years of age or older. The average household size was 3.02. There were 1,261 families (78.4% of all households).

There were 1,650 housing units at an average density of 1,004.9 units per square mile (388.0 units/km^{2}). Of the total housing units, 97.5% were occupied and 2.5% were vacant. Of occupied units, 77.1% were owner-occupied and 22.9% were renter-occupied. The homeowner vacancy rate was 0.2% and the rental vacancy rate was 1.6%.

Racial composition as of the 2020 census
Race	Number	Percent
White	3,084	63.4%
Black or African American	29	0.6%
American Indian and Alaska Native	63	1.3%
Asian	63	1.3%
Native Hawaiian and Other Pacific Islander	7	0.1%
Some other race	917	18.8%
Two or more races	702	14.4%
Hispanic or Latino (of any race)	1,772	36.4%

=== Demographic estimates ===
In 2023, the US Census Bureau estimated that 9.4% of the population were foreign-born. Of all people aged 5 or older, 76.1% spoke only English at home, 19.1% spoke Spanish, 4.4% spoke other Indo-European languages, 0.3% spoke Asian or Pacific Islander languages, and 0.1% spoke other languages. Of those aged 25 or older, 88.3% were high school graduates and 19.2% had a bachelor's degree.

=== Income and poverty ===
The median household income was $97,468, and the per capita income was $34,628. About 12.6% of families and 14.2% of the population were below the poverty line.

=== 2010 census ===
According to the 2010 census, Denair had a population of 4,404. The population density was 2,222.9 inhabitants per square mile (858.3/km^{2}). The racial makeup of Denair was 3,425 (77.8%) White, 25 (0.6%) African American, 55 (1.2%) Native American, 42 (1.0%) Asian, 4 (0.1%) Pacific Islander, 699 (15.9%) from other races, and 154 (3.5%) from two or more races. Hispanic or Latino people of any race were 1,423 persons (32.3%).

The whole population lived in households, no one lived in non-institutionalized group quarters and no one was institutionalized.

There were 1,451 households, 611 (42.1%) had children under the age of 18 living in them, 913 (62.9%) were opposite-sex married couples living together, 168 (11.6%) had a female householder with no husband present, 86 (5.9%) had a male householder with no wife present. There were 71 (4.9%) unmarried opposite-sex partnerships, and 10 (0.7%) same-sex married couples or partnerships. 221 households (15.2%) were one person and 113 (7.8%) had someone living alone who was 65 or older. The average household size was 3.04. There were 1,167 families (80.4% of households); the average family size was 3.38.

The age distribution was 1,233 people (28.0%) under the age of 18, 407 people (9.2%) aged 18 to 24, 1,186 people (26.9%) aged 25 to 44, 1,098 people (24.9%) aged 45 to 64, and 480 people (10.9%) who were 65 or older. The median age was 34.8 years. For every 100 females, there were 96.8 males. For every 100 females age 18 and over, there were 94.3 males.

There were 1,523 housing units at an average density of 768.7 per square mile, of the occupied units 1,128 (77.7%) were owner-occupied and 323 (22.3%) were rented. The homeowner vacancy rate was 2.1%; the rental vacancy rate was 5.2%. 3,275 people (74.4% of the population) lived in owner-occupied housing units and 1,129 people (25.6%) lived in rental housing units.

== Controversy ==
On November 8, 2010 Denair Middle School asked a student to remove the American flag from the back of his bicycle, citing Mexicans and fears for the students' safety. Four days later, Denair School Superintendent, Edward Parraz overturned the decision again, allowing the student to display the flag, adding that the racial concerns would be discussed with the students involved and their parents.

== Government ==
In the California State Legislature, Denair is in the 4th senatorial district, represented by Republican Marie Alvarado-Gil, and in the 22nd Assembly district, represented by Republican Juan Alanis.

In the United States House of Representatives, Denair is in California's 5th congressional district, represented by Republican Tom McClintock.
