= CA-27 =

CA-27 may refer to:

- California's 27th congressional district
- California State Route 27
- CA-27 Sabre, a fighter aircraft
