= List of state highways in California (pre-1964) =

Pre-1964 State Routes in California
- Pre-1960s standard California state route shields, in the shape of a miner's spade to honor the California Gold Rush. These signs were black and white while the modern standard shields are in green and white.

Highway names
- Interstates: Interstate XX (I-XX)
- US Highways: U.S. Route XX (US XX)
- State: State Route XX (SR XX)

System links
- State highways in California; Interstate; US; State; Scenic; History; Pre‑1964; Unconstructed; Deleted; Freeways

This is a list of state highways in the U.S. state of California that existed before the 1964 renumbering. It includes routes that were defined by the California State Legislature but never built, and is sorted by the unmarked legislative route number. Prior to the 1964 renumbering, the unmarked legislative route numbers did not necessarily match the signed route numbers marked for the public. For details on routes added before 1931, see history of California's state highway system#List of route numbers, 1917-1931; the dates given here are when the numbers were assigned (1916 for routes added in the first two bond issues, 1917 for routes added by the legislature before 1917).

== Legislative Routes ==
Number	From	To	Now	Formed	Notes
Route 1	Sausalito (north end, Golden Gate Bridge)	Oregon (US 199)	US 101, US 199	1916	Redwood Highway
Route 2	San Francisco (south end, Golden Gate Bridge near Route 56)	Mexico spurs: Orcutt (Route 56); Harriston (Route 56)	US 101, I-280, SR 82, US 101, I-5, SR 72, I-5, former SR 51, I-5 spurs: SR 135	1916	El Camino Real (part of Pacific Highway)
Route 3	Sacramento (Routes 4/6/11)	Oregon (US 99)	SR 160, SR 51, I-80, SR 65, SR 70, SR 20, SR 99, SR 36, I-5	1916	(Part of) Pacific Highway
Route 4	Sacramento (Routes 3/6/11)	Los Angeles (Route 2) former spur: Santa Clarita (Route 23) via SR 126	SR 160, SR 99, I-5, former SR 163, I-5	1916	Golden State Highway
Route 5	Santa Cruz (Route 56)	West Point spur: Oakland (Route 68)	SR 17, I-280, I-680, SR 238, I-580, I-205, I-5, SR 4, SR 26 spur: I-580, I-80	1916	
Route 6	Napa (Route 49) formerly Napa (Route 8) via SR 121	Sacramento (Routes 3/4/11)	former SR 221, SR 121, SR 128, I-80, US 50	1916	
Route 7	Albany (Route 69) formerly Benicia via I-680	Red Bluff (Route 3)	I-80, SR 113, I-5	1916	
Route 8	Novato (Route 1)	Cordelia (Route 7)	SR 37, SR 121, SR 221, SR 12	1916	
Route 9	Saticoy (Route 79) formerly Ventura (Route 2)	San Bernardino (Route 43)	SR 118, I-210, SR 210, SR 66	1916	
Route 10	San Lucas (Route 2)	Sequoia National Park	SR 198	1916	
Route 11	Antioch (Route 75)	Nevada (US 50)	SR 160, US 50	1916	
Route 12	Point Loma	El Centro (Routes 26, 27)	SR 209, I-8	1916	
Route 13	Salida (Route 4)	Bridgeport (Route 23)	SR 219, SR 108 (CA)	1916	
Route 14	Oakland (Route 5)	Richmond (Route 7) formerly Martinez (Route 75) via I-80	SR 123	1916	
Route 15	Fort Bragg (Route 1)	Emigrant Gap (Route 37)	SR 20	1916	
Route 16	Hopland (Route 1)	Lakeport (Route 89)	SR 175	1916	
Route 17	Roseville (Route 3)	Nevada City (Routes 15, 25)	I-80, SR 49	1916	
Route 18	Merced (Route 4)	Yosemite National Park formerly Crane Flat (Route 40)	SR 140	1916	All-Year Highway
Route 19	Claremont (Route 9)	Beaumont (Route 26) spur: Santa Ana (Route 2)	former SR 215, SR 60 spur: SR 60, SR 57	1916	
Route 20	Arcata (Route 1)	Termo (Route 73)	SR 299, SR 44, SR 139, SR 36	1916	
Route 21	Richvale (Route 3)	Beckwourth Pass (Route 29)	SR 162, SR 70	1916	
Route 22	Hollister (Route 32)	Castroville (Route 56)	SR 156	1916	
Route 23	Los Angeles (Route 4)	South Lake Tahoe (Route 11)	SR 14, US 395, SR 89	1916	
Route 24	Lodi (Route 4)	Nevada (SR 88)	SR 12, SR 49, SR 4, SR 89, SR 88	1916	
Route 25	Colfax (Route 37)	Sattley (Route 83)	SR 174, SR 49	1916	
Route 26	Los Angeles (Route 2)	Calexico spur: loop around Brawley former spur: San Bernardino via SR 18	I-10, SR 86, SR 111 spur: SR 228	1916	
Route 27	El Centro	Arizona (US 80)	I-8	1916	Old Spanish Trail
Route 28	Redding (Route 3)	Nevada (SR 8A)	SR 299	1916	
Route 29	Peanut (Route 35)	Nevada (US 395)	SR 36, SR 172, SR 36, US 395	1916	
Route 30	Devore (Route 31)	Ontario (Route 26)	I-15	1959	Redundant to Route 194
Route 30 deleted 1919	Oroville (Route 21)	Quincy	SR 70	1916	became part of Route 21
Route 31	San Bernardino (Route 43)	Nevada (US 91/US 466) former spur: Colton (Route 26)	I-215, I-15	1916	
Route 32	Watsonville (Route 56)	Chowchilla (Route 249)	SR 152	1916	
Route 33	Famoso (Route 4)	Cambria (Route 56)	SR 46	1916	
Route 34	Galt (Route 4)	Woodfords (Route 23)	SR 104, SR 88	1916	
Route 35	West Covina (Route 99)	Los Alamitos (Route 22)	I-605	1934	
Route 36	Downieville (Route 25)	Saddleback Mountain formerly farther north	former SR 194	1917	
Route 37	Auburn (Route 17)	Truckee (Route 38)	I-80	1917	
Route 38	South Lake Tahoe (Route 11)	Nevada (US 40)	SR 89, I-80	1917	
Route 39	Tahoe City (Route 38)	Nevada (SR 28)	SR 28	1917	
Route 40	Chinese Camp (Route 13)	Benton (Route 76) spur: Nevada (SR 31)	SR 120 spur: SR 167	1917	
Route 41	Tracy (Route 5)	Kings Canyon National Park	SR 33, SR 180	1917	
Route 42	Los Gatos (Route 5)	Big Basin Redwoods State Park (Route 44)	SR 9, SR 236	1917	
Route 43	Newport Beach (Route 60)	Victorville (Route 31) spur: loop around Big Bear Lake	SR 55, SR 91, I-215, SR 249, SR 210, SR 18 spur: SR 38	1917	
Route 44	Boulder Creek (Route 116)	Big Basin Redwoods State Park (Route 42)	SR 236	1917	
Route 45	Biggs (Route 3)	Willows (Route 7)	SR 162	1919	
Route 46	Yreka (Route 3)	Klamath (Route 1)	SR 96, SR 169	1919	
Route 47	Orland (Route 7)	Chester (Route 29)	SR 36	1919	
Route 48	Cloverdale (Route 1)	Albion (Route 56)	SR 128	1919	
Route 49	Napa (Route 8)	Lower Lake (Route 15)	SR 29, SR 53	1919	
Route 50	Rumsey (Route 15)	Sacramento (Routes 4, 11)	SR 16	1919	
Route 51	Valley Ford (Route 56)	Sonoma (Route 8) formerly Sears Point (Route 8)	SR 12	1919	
Route 52	Mill Valley (Route 1)	Tiburon	SR 131	1919	
Route 53	Fairfield (Route 7)	Lodi (Route 4)	SR 12	1919	
Route 54	Sacramento (Route 11)	Drytown (Route 65)	SR 16	1919	
Route 55	San Francisco (Route 56)	Redwood Estates (Route 5)	SR 35	1919	
Route 56	Las Cruces (Route 2)	Fernbridge (Route 1) spur: Leggett (Route 1)	SR 1, SR 211 spur: SR 1	1919	
Route 57	Santa Maria (Route 2)	Inyokern (Route 23)	SR 166, SR 178	1919	
Route 58	Santa Margarita (Route 2)	Arizona (US 66)	SR 58, I-40	1919	
Route 59	Gorman (Route 4)	Lake Arrowhead (Route 43)	SR 138, SR 173	1919	
Route 60	El Rio (Route 2)	San Juan Capistrano (Route 2)	SR 1	1919	
Route 61	Los Angeles (Route 162); Formerly Los Angeles (Route 4)	Wrightwood (Route 59)	SR 2	1919	
Route 62	Buena Park (Route 171)	Angeles National Forest (Route 61)	SR 39	1919	
Route 63	Big Pine (Route 23)	Nevada (SR 3)	SR 168, SR 266	1919	
Route 64	San Juan Capistrano (Route 2)	Arizona (US 60/US 70/US 95) spur: Mecca (Routes 187, 204)	SR 74, SR 111, I-10 spur: former SR 195	1919	
Route 65	Auburn (Routes 17, 37)	Oakhurst (Route 125)	SR 49, SR 108, SR 120, SR 49	1921	
Route 66	Tracy (Routes 5, 238)	Oakdale (Route 13)	SR 120	1921	
Route 67	San Juan Bautista (Route 2)	Watsonville (Route 56)	SR 129	1921	
Route 68	San Jose (Route 2)	Oakland (Route 5)	, I-880	1923	
Route 69	San Jose (Routes 68, 239)	Point Reyes Station (Route 56) spur: Warm Springs (Route 5) former spur: Richmond (Route 14) via I-80	I-880, I-580, SR 251 spur: SR 262	1925	
Route 70	Ukiah (Route 1)	Talmage	SR 222	1925	
Route 71	Crescent City (Route 1)	Oregon (US 101)	US 101	1925	
Route 72	Weed (Route 3)	Oregon (US 97)	US 97	1931	
Route 73	Susanville (Route 29)	Oregon (US 395)	US 395	1931	
Route 74	Napa (Route 6)	Cordelia (Route 7) spur: Vallejo (Route 7) former branch: Benicia	SR 121, SR 221, SR 29, SR 141, I-780, I-680 spur: SR 29	1931	
Route 75	Oakland (Routes 5, 226)	Altaville (Route 65) spur: Benicia (Route 74)	SR 24, I-680, SR 242, SR 4 spur: I-680	1931	
Route 76	Fresno (Route 125)	Nevada (US 6)	SR 168, US 6	1931	
Route 77	Los Angeles	San Diego (Route 2)	former SR 212, I-10, SR 71, SR 91, I-15, SR 163	1931	
Route 78	Riverside (Routes 26, 43)	Descanso (Route 12)	I-215, I-15, SR 79	1931	
Route 79	Ventura (Route 2)	Santa Clarita (Route 23)	SR 126	1931	
Route 80	Carpinteria (Route 151)	Los Olivos (Route 2) spurs: Santa Barbara (Route 2); Santa Barbara (Route 2)	SR 192, SR 154 spurs: SR 144; SR 154	1931	
Route 81	Smith River (Route 71)	Hiouchi (Route 1)	SR 197	1933	
Route 82	Weaverville (Route 20)	Montague	SR 3	1933	
Route 83	Mount Shasta (Route 3)	Truckee (Routes 37, 38)	SR 89	1933	
Route 84	Willow Creek (Route 20)	Weitchpec (Route 46)	SR 96	1933	
Route 85	McKinleyville (Route 1)	Blue Lake (Route 20)	SR 200	1933	
Route 86	Lassen National Park (Route 83)	Mineral (Route 29)	SR 36	1933	
Route 87	Woodland (Route 7)	Chico (Route 3)	SR 113, SR 99, SR 20, SR 70, SR 149	1933	
Route 88	Hamilton City (Route 47)	Knights Landing (Route 87)	SR 45	1933	
Route 89	Middletown (Route 49)	Upper Lake (Route 15)	SR 175, SR 29	1933	
Route 90	Vacaville (Route 7)	Dunnigan (Route 7)	I-505	1933	
Route 91	Lincoln (Route 3)	Newcastle (Route 17)	SR 193	1933	
Route 92	Coloma (Route 65)	Marshall's Monument	SR 153	1933	
Route 93	Cool (Route 65)	Placerville (Route 65)	SR 193	1933	
Route 94	South Lake Tahoe (Route 38)	Fallen Leaf	former SR 188	1933	
Route 95	Coleville (Route 23)	Nevada (US 395)	US 395	1933	
Route 96	Bridgeport (Route 23)	Nevada (SR 22)	SR 182	1933	
Route 97	Stockton (Route 4)	Drytown (Route 54) spur: Ione (Route 34)	SR 88, SR 124 spur: SR 88	1933	
Route 98	Sacramento (Routes 4, 11)	Sacramento (Route 3)	SR 51	1933	
Route 99	Rio Vista (Route 53)	West Sacramento (Route 6)	SR 84	1933	
Route 100	Rio Vista (Route 99)	Walnut Grove (Route 11)	SR 220	1933	
Route 101	Rio Vista (Route 53)	Dixon (Route 7)	SR 113	1933	
Route 102	Rutherford (Route 49)	Lake Berryessa (Route 6)	SR 128	1933	
Route 103	Albion (Route 1)	Calistoga (Route 49)	SR 128	1933	
Route 104	Jenner (Route 56)	Sonoma (Route 8) formerly Vallejo (Route 7) via SR 12, I-80	SR 116	1933	
Route 105	Half Moon Bay (Route 56)	Oakland formerly Oakland (Route 69)	SR 92, SR 185	1933	
Route 106	Hercules (Route 7)	Concord (Route 75)	SR 4	1933	
Route 107	San Gregorio (Route 56)	Walnut Creek (Route 75) spur: Sunol (Route 108)	SR 84, SR 114, SR 84, I-680 spur: I-680	1933	
Route 108	Mission San José (Route 5)	Brentwood (Route 75)	I-680, SR 84	1933	
Route 109	Crows Landing (Route 238)	Modesto (Route 13)	SR 108	1933	
Route 110	Brentwood (Route 75)	Coulterville (Route 65) spur: Vernalis (Route 238)	SR 239, I-580, SR 132 spur: I-580	1933	
Route 111	June Lake Junction (Route 23)	Grant Lake Junction (Route 23)	SR 158	1933	
Route 112	Mammoth Lakes (Route 23)	Mammoth Lakes	SR 203	1933	
Route 113	Mountain View (Route 2)	Milpitas (Route 5)	SR 237	1933	
Route 114	San Jose (Route 2)	Mountain View (Route 68)	SR 85	1933	
Route 115	San Jose (Route 68) formerly San Jose (Route 5)	Patterson (Route 41)	SR 130	1933	
Route 116	Santa Cruz (Route 5)	Waterman Gap (Route 42)	SR 9	1933	
Route 117	Monterey (Route 56)	Salinas (Route 2)	SR 68	1933	
Route 118	Salinas (Route 2)	Castroville (Route 56)	SR 183	1933	
Route 119	Gilroy (Route 2)	Priest Valley (Route 10)	SR 25	1933	
Route 120	Soledad (Route 2)	Paicines (Route 119)	SR 146	1933	
Route 121	Los Banos (Route 32)	Santa Nella (Route 41)	SR 33	1933	
Route 122	Gustine (Route 238)	Merced (Route 4)	SR 140	1933	
Route 123	Snelling	El Nido (Route 32)	SR 59	1933	
Route 124	Chowchilla (Route 4)	Chowchilla (Route 32)	SR 233	1933	
Route 125	Morro Bay (Route 56)	Yosemite National Park	SR 41	1933	
Route 126	Kerman (Route 41)	Friant (Route 125)	SR 145	1933	
Route 127	Tipton (Route 4)	Baker (Route 31) spur: Lone Pine (Route 23)	SR 190, SR 127 spur: SR 136	1933	
Route 128	Death Valley Junction (Route 127)	Nevada (SR 29)	SR 127	1933	
Route 129	Bakersfield (Route 4)	Dunlap (Route 41)	SR 65, SR 245	1933	
Route 130	Orosi (Route 132)	Auckland (Route 129)	former SR 63	1933	
Route 131	Kingsburg (Route 4)	Woodlake (Route 10)	SR 201, SR 245, SR 216	1933	
Route 132	Tulare (Route 134)	Orange Cove	SR 63	1933	
Route 133	Visalia (Route 132)	Woodlake (Routes 129, 131)	SR 216	1933	
Route 134	Corcoran (Route 135)	Lindsay (Route 129)	SR 137	1933	
Route 135	Wasco (Routes 33, 139) formerly Ducor (Route 129)	Selma (Route 4)	SR 43	1933	
Route 136	Delano (Route 4)	Ducor (Route 129)	SR 155	1933	
Route 137	Santa Margarita (Route 58)	Creston (Route 125)	SR 229	1933	
Route 138	Mendota (Route 41)	Ventura (Route 2)	SR 33	1933	
Route 139	Taft (Route 140)	Wasco (Routes 33, 135)	SR 43	1933	
Route 140	Taft (Route 138)	Arvin (Route 58)	SR 119, SR 99, SR 223	1933	
Route 141	Bakersfield (Route 4)	Oildale (Route 4)	SR 204	1933	
Route 142	Bakersfield (Route 141)	Lake Isabella (Route 57)	SR 155	1933	
Route 143	Arvin (Route 140)	Bakersfield (Route 57)	SR 184	1933	
Route 144	California Correctional Institution	Tehachapi (Route 58)	SR 202	1933	
Route 145	Cajon Pass (Route 31)	Little Lake (Route 23)	US 395	1933	
Route 146	Brawley (Route 187)	Nevada (US 95)	SR 78, I-10, US 95	1933	
Route 147	Arroyo Grande (Route 2)	San Luis Obispo (Route 2)	SR 227	1933	
Route 148	Guadalupe (Route 56)	Sisquoc	SR 166, SR 176	1933	
Route 149	Surf	Santa Ynez (Route 80)	SR 246	1933	
Route 150	Montecito (Route 2)	Santa Barbara (Route 2)	SR 225	1933	
Route 151	Carpinteria (Route 2)	Santa Paula (Route 79)	SR 150	1933	
Route 152	Carpinteria (Route 2)	Carpinteria State Beach	SR 224	1933	
Route 153	Port Hueneme	Somis (Route 9)	SR 34	1933	
Route 154	El Rio (Route 60)	Saticoy (Route 9) formerly Saticoy (Route 79) via SR 118	SR 232	1933	
Route 155	Malibu (Route 60)	Fillmore (Route 79)	SR 23	1933	
Route 156	Topanga Beach (Route 60)	Chatsworth (Route 9)	SR 27	1933	
Route 157	Santa Clarita (Route 4)	San Fernando (Route 9)	I-210	1933	
Route 158	San Fernando (Route 4)	El Toro (Route 2)	I-405	1933	
Route 159	North Hollywood (Route 2)	San Fernando (Route 4)	SR 170	1933	
Route 160	Inglewood (Route 158)	Hollywood (Route 2)	SR 170	1933	
Route 161	North Hollywood (Route 2)	Monrovia (Route 9) spur: Los Angeles (Route 4)	SR 134, SR 248 spur: I-5	1933	
Route 162	Santa Monica (Route 60)	Los Angeles (Route 61) formerly Eagle Rock (Route 161)	SR 2	1933	
Route 163	Santa Monica (Route 60)	Culver City (Route 173)	SR 187	1933	
Route 164	Torrance (Route 60)	Culver City (Route 158)	SR 107	1933	
Route 165	San Pedro	La Cañada Flintridge (Route 9)	I-110, SR 110, SR 159	1933	
Route 166	East Los Angeles (Route 172)	Norwalk (Route 174) formerly Santa Fe Springs (Route 171)	former SR 245, I-5	1933	
Route 167	San Pedro (Route 165)	Pasadena (Route 9) former spur: East Los Angeles (Route 166) via I-710	SR 47, I-710	1933	
Route 168	Long Beach (Route 60)	Pasadena (Route 9)	SR 19, SR 164	1933	
Route 169	Seaside (Route 56)	Del Rey Oaks (Route 117)	SR 218	1959	
Route 169 deleted 1945	Long Beach	Downey (Route 174)		1933	
Route 170	Seal Beach (Route 60)	Duarte (Route 9)	I-605	1933	
Route 171	Huntington Beach (Route 60)	Buena Park (Route 62) formerly Whittier (Route 2)	SR 39	1933	
Route 172	Los Angeles (Route 2)	Diamond Bar (Route 19)	SR 60	1933	
Route 173	Santa Monica (Route 60)	Los Angeles (Route 2)	I-10	1933	
Route 174	Inglewood (Route 60)	Santa Ana (Route 2)	I-105 (former SR 42), SR 90, I-5	1933	
Route 175	Hermosa Beach (Route 60)	Anaheim (Route 43)	SR 91	1933	
Route 176	Norwalk (Route 174)	Anaheim (Route 43)	SR 90	1933	
Route 177	Brea (Route 176)	Chino (Route 77)	SR 142	1933	
Route 178	Lakewood (Route 168)	Anaheim (Route 174) formerly Olive (Route 43)	former SR 214	1933	
Route 179	Long Beach (Route 60)	Orange (Route 43)	SR 22	1933	
Route 180	Orange (Route 2)	Anaheim (Route 175)	former SR 250	1933	
Route 181 deleted 1951	Santa Ana (Route 43)	Yorba Linda (Route 176)		1933	
Route 182	Orange (Route 43) formerly Orange (Route 2)	Irvine Regional Park	former SR 22	1933	
Route 183	Canyondam (Route 83)	Westwood (Route 29)	SR 147	1961	
Route 183 deleted 1951	Seal Beach (Route 60)	Santa Ana (Route 2)		1933	
Route 184	Corona del Mar (Route 60)	Santa Ana (Route 2)	SR 73	1933	
Route 185	Laguna Beach (Route 60)	Irvine (Route 2)	SR 133	1933	
Route 186	San Jacinto (Route 194)	Moreno Valley (Route 19)	former SR 177	1959 (was Route 194)	
Route 186 deleted 1935	Palmdale (Route 23)	Wrightwood (Route 61)		1933	
Route 187	Lucerne Valley (Route 43)	Bonds Corner (Route 202)	SR 247, SR 62, SR 111, SR 78, SR 115	1933	
Route 188	Crestline (Route 43)	Hesperia (Route 59)	SR 138	1933	
Route 189	Crestline (Route 43)	Lake Arrowhead (Route 59)	SR 189	1933	
Route 190	San Dimas (Route 9)	Big Bear Lake (Route 43)	SR 210, SR 38	1933	
Route 191	Devore (Route 31)	San Bernardino (Route 190)	SR 206	1933	
Route 192	Chino Hills (Route 77)	Upland (Route 190)	SR 83	1933	
Route 193	Corona (Route 43)	Devore (Route 31)	I-15	1933	
Route 194	Temecula (Route 78)	Beaumont (Route 26) formerly Moreno Valley (Route 19)	SR 79	1933	
Route 195	Oceanside (Route 2)	Lake Henshaw (Route 78)	SR 76	1933	
Route 196	Oceanside (Route 2)	Escondido (Route 77)	SR 78	1933	
Route 197	Escondido (Route 77)	Ramona (Route 198)	SR 78	1933	
Route 198	Spring Valley (Route 200)	Salton City (Route 26)	SR 125, I-8, SR 67, SR 78	1933	
Route 199	Coronado	San Ysidro (Route 2)	SR 75	1933	
Route 200	San Diego (Route 2)	Boulevard (Route 12)	SR 94	1933	
Route 201	Calipatria (Route 187)	Calexico (Route 26)	SR 115, SR 111	1933	
Route 202	Ocotillo (Route 12) formerly Seeley (Route 12)	Holtville (Route 27)	SR 98	1933	
Route 203	Oasis (Route 26)	Mecca (Route 204)	SR 195	1935	
Route 204	Coachella (Route 26)	Mecca (Routes 64, 187)	former SR 231, SR 195	1935	
Route 205	Los Angeles (Route 165)	Pasadena (Route 161)	SR 110	1935	
Route 206	Emeryville (Route 257)	Lake Temescal (Routes 75, 227)	SR 13	1935	
Route 207	Highland (Route 190)	Running Springs (Route 43) formerly Green Valley Lake	SR 330	1937	
Route 208	Sears Point (Route 8)	Vallejo (Route 7)	SR 37	1939	
Route 209	Shasta Lake (Route 3)	Shasta Dam	SR 151	1939	
Route 210	Canby (Route 28)	Oregon (OR 39) spur: Dorris (Route 72)	SR 139 spur: SR 161	1939	
Route 211	Guerneville (Route 104)	Calistoga (Routes 49/103)	SR 116, SR 12, US-101, SR 128	1943	
Route 212	Nevada (SR 52)	Inyokern (Route 23)	SR 178	1947	
Route 213 deleted ca. 1963	San Fernando (Route 4)	San Fernando (Route 4)		1947	deleted when Route 4 was relocated and old Route 4 was relinquished
Route 214	Woodside (Route 239)	Redwood City (Route 68)	SR 84	1959 (was Route 107)	
Route 214 deleted 1955	Belmont (Route 68)	Crystal Springs Reservoir (Route 55)		1949	
Route 216	Susanville (Route 20)	Adin (Route 28)	SR 139	1959	
Route 218	Yucca Valley (Route 187)	Twentynine Palms	SR 62	1961	
Route 220	Winters (Route 90)	Martinez (Route 106)	I-505, I-80, SR 4	1947	
Route 221	Inglewood (Route 60) formerly LAX Airport	Santa Fe Springs (Route 170)	SR 90	1947	
Route 222	Los Angeles (Route 165)	Los Angeles (Route 205)	former SR 241	1947	
Route 223	San Francisco (Route 2)	San Francisco (Route 56)	former SR 241	1947	
Route 224	San Francisco (Route 2)	San Francisco (Route 68)	former SR 480, I-280	1947	
Route 225	San Francisco (Route 56)	San Francisco (Route 2)	I-280	1947	
Route 226	San Leandro (Route 105)	Oakland (Routes 5, 75)	SR 112, SR 61, SR 260, I-980	1947	
Route 227	Lake Temescal (Routes 75, 206)	Oakland (Route 5)	SR 13	1947	
Route 228	San Lorenzo (Route 258)	Hayward (Route 5)	I-238	1947	
Route 229	Pacifica (Route 56)	San Bruno (Route 68)	I-380	1947	
Route 230	Los Angeles (Route 2)	Los Angeles (Route 172)	former SR 165	1947	
Route 231 deleted 1953	San Pedro (Route 165)	Long Beach (Route 167)	SR 47, I-710	1949	re-added in 1957 as an extension of Route 167
Route 232	Sacramento (Route 50)	Marysville (Route 3)	SR 99, SR 70	1949	
Route 233	Sierraville	Vinton	SR 49	1953	
Route 234 deleted 1957	Nevada	San Bruno (Routes 68/229)	SR 88, SR 12, SR 99, SR 12, I-5, SR 4, I-80, US-101, I-380	1953	
Route 235	Oakland (Route 69)	Concord (Route 75)	SR 77	1953	
Route 236	Santa Barbara (Route 2)	UC Santa Barbara	SR 217	1955	
Route 237	Daly City (Route 56)	San Bruno	former SR 117	1956	
Route 238	Wheeler Ridge (Route 4)	Woodland (Route 7)	I-5	1957	
Route 239	San Jose (Routes 68, 69) formerly San Jose (Route 2) via SR 85	Daly City (Route 56)	I-880, I-280	1957	
Route 240	Glendale (Route 4)	Pomona (Route 26)	SR 134, I-210, SR 57	1957	
Route 241	San Ysidro (Route 2)	La Jolla (Route 2)	I-805	1959	
Route 242	West Sacramento (Route 6)	Sacramento (Routes 3, 288)	I-80	1959	
Route 243	Kelseyville, California (Route 89)	Lower Lake (Route 49)	SR 29	1959	
Route 244	Vacaville (Route 7)	Lake Berryessa (Route 6)	SR 179	1959	
Route 245	Sacramento (Route 232)	Yuba City (Route 87)	SR 99	1959	
Route 246	Elkhorn (Route 238)	Auburn (Route 17)	SR 102	1959	
Route 247	Elk Grove (Route 4)	Antelope (Route 246)	SR 143	1959	
Route 248	Sacramento (Route 238)	Sloughhouse (Route 247)	SR 148	1959	
Route 249	Exeter (Route 10)	Roseville (Route 17)	SR 65	1959	
Route 250	Forestville (Route 104)	Fulton (Route 1)	SR 181	1959	
Route 251	Greenbrae (Route 1)	Point San Quentin (Route 69)	SR 251	1959	
Route 252	Nicasio (Route 69)	Novato (Route 1)	SR 37	1959	
Route 253	South San Francisco (Route 68)	San Francisco (Route 224) spur: San Francisco (Routes 2, 68)	SR 230, I-280 spur: I-280	1959	
Route 254	Moraga (Route 235)	Richmond (Route 69)	SR 93	1959	
Route 255	Burton (Route 235)	Alamo (Route 107)	SR 93	1959	
Route 256	Walnut Creek (Route 75)	Pittsburg (Route 75)	SR 24	1959	
Route 257	Oakland (Route 69)	Albany (Route 69)	SR 61	1959	
Route 258	Newark (Route 107)	Oakland (Route 5)	SR 61, SR 13	1959	
Route 259	Hayward (Route 105)	Castro Valley (Route 5)	SR 92	1959	
Route 260	Stockton (Route 238)	Stockton (Route 4)	SR 235	1959	
Route 261	French Camp (Route 238)	Stockton (Route 4)	SR 234	1959	
Route 262	Pacific Grove	Salinas (Route 56)	SR 68	1959	
Route 263	Paicines (Route 119)	Mendota (Route 41)	SR 180	1959	
Route 264	Taft (Route 238)	Arvin (Routes 4, 140)	SR 223	1959	
Route 265	Malibu (Route 60)	San Fernando (Route 4)	SR 64	1959	
Route 266	Sunland (Route 9)	Barstow (Route 58) spur: La Cañada Flintridge (Route 61)	SR 118, SR 249, SR 122 spur: SR 249	1959	
Route 267	Gorman (Route 59)	Barstow (Route 266)	SR 138, SR 48	1959	
Route 268	Victorville (Route 43)	Pearblossom (Route 59)	SR 18	1959	
Route 269	Angeles National Forest (Route 61)	Palmdale (Route 23)	former SR 196, SR 249	1959	
Route 270	Terminal Island (Route 167)	Los Angeles (Route 173)	SR 47	1959	
Route 271	Pico Rivera (Route 170)	Pico Rivera (Route 168)	SR 164	1959	
Route 272	Industry (Route 19)	Pomona (Route 240)	SR 57	1959	
Route 273	Huntington Beach (Route 60)	Santa Ana (Route 179)	SR 57	1959	
Route 274	Chino (Route 77)	Upland (Route 190)	SR 142	1959	
Route 275	San Bernardino (Route 26)	San Bernardino (Route 190)	SR 18	1959	
Route 276	Riverside (Route 78)	Devore (Route 193)	SR 81	1959	
Route 277	Temecula (Route 78)	Anza (Route 64)	SR 371	1959	
Route 278	La Jolla (Route 2)	Ramona (Route 198)	SR 56	1959	
Route 279	La Jolla (Route 2)	Santee (Route 198)	SR 52	1959	
Route 280	National City (Route 2)	El Cajon (Route 12)	SR 54	1959	
Route 281	San Ysidro (Route 2)	Otay Mesa (Route 282)	SR 905	1959	
Route 282	Otay Mesa (Route 281)	Poway (Route 56)	SR 125	1959	
Route 283	National City (Route 2)	Miramar (Route 77)	SR 252, SR 15, I-15	1959	
Route 284	San Diego (Route 2)	San Diego (Route 241)	SR 171	1959	
Route 285	San Diego (Route 241)	Sweetwater Reservoir (Route 282)	SR 157	1959	
Route 286	Ocean Beach	San Diego (Routes 2, 12)	I-8	1959	
Route 287	Santa Cruz (Routes 5, 56)	Santa Cruz (Route 56)	SR 100	1959	
Route 288	Sacramento (Routes 3, 242)	Fair Oaks (Route 249)	SR 244	1959	
Route 289	San Jose (Route 68)	San Francisco (Route 253)	SR 87	1959	
Route 290	Santa Monica (Route 60)	Santa Clarita (Route 4)	SR 14	1959	
Route 291	Torrance (Route 158)	San Pedro	SR 213	1961	
Route 291	Boonville (Route 48)	Ukiah (Route 1)	SR 253	1963	
Route 292	San Jose (Route 68)	San Jose (Route 114)	SR 87	1961	
Route 293	Sacramento (Route 11)	San Jose (Route 68)	CA-160, CA-51, US-50, I-80, I-680, I-580, I-238, I-880, SR 237, US-101, SR 87	1961	
Route 294	Eureka (Route 1)	Samoa Peninsula	SR 255	1963	
Route 295	Oroville (Route 21)	Paradise	SR 191	1961	
Route 296	Phillipsville (Route 1)	Redcrest (Route 1)	SR 254	1963	

== Sign routes ==
SR 1: still present
SR 2: still present
SR 3: became US 101 Alt. ca. 1936 and SR 1 in 1964
SR 4: still present
SR 5: became SR 35 in 1964
US 6: still present

SR 6: became SR 26 in 1937 and I-10 in 1964

SR 7: became I-405 in 1964
SR 8: became SR 26 in 1964
SR 9: still present
SR 10: became SR 42 in the early 1960s and I-105 in 1968
SR 11: became I-110/SR 110 in 1981
SR 12: still present
SR 13: still present

SR 13: became SR 17 ca. 1935

SR 14: became SR 91 in 1964
SR 15: became SR 7 in 1964 and I-710 in 1984
SR 16: still present
SR 17: still present
SR 18: still present
SR 19: still present
SR 20: still present
SR 21: became I-680 in 1964 and 1976
SR 22: still present
SR 23: still present
SR 24: still present
SR 25: still present
SR 26: became I-10 in 1964

SR 26: number dropped ca. 1936 (Bolsa Avenue)

SR 27: still present
SR 28: still present

SR 28: became SR 128 ca. 1955

SR 29: still present
SR 30: became SR 210 in 1998
SR 32: still present
SR 33: still present
SR 35: became I-605 in 1964
SR 36: still present
SR 37: still present
SR 38: still present
SR 39: still present
US 40: became I-80 in 1964

US 40 Alt.: became SR 70 in 1964

SR 41: still present
SR 42: became I-105 in 1968
SR 43: still present
SR 44: still present

SR 44: became US 299 ca. 1935 and SR 299 in 1964

SR 45: still present
SR 48: became SR 37 in 1964
US 48: became US 50 ca. 1932 and I-580 in 1964
SR 49: still present
US 50: still present
SR 53: still present
SR 55: still present
SR 59: still present
US 60: became SR 60 in 1964
SR 63: still present
SR 65: still present
US 66: became SR 66 in 1964
SR 67: still present
SR 68: still present
US 70: became I-10 in 1964
SR 71: still present
SR 74: still present
SR 75: still present
SR 76: still present
SR 78: still present
SR 79: still present
US 80: became I-8 in 1964
SR 83: became part of SR 79 by 1940
SR 84: still present
SR 88: still present
SR 89: still present
US 91: became SR 91 in 1964
SR 94: still present
US 95: still present
SR 95: became US 395 ca. 1935
SR 96: still present
US 97: still present
SR 98: still present
US 99: became SR 99 in 1964
US 101: still present
SR 104: still present
SR 107: still present
SR 108: still present
SR 111: still present
SR 115: still present
SR 118: still present
SR 120: still present
SR 126: still present
SR 127: still present
SR 128: still present
SR 132: still present
SR 134: still present
SR 138: still present
SR 139: still present
SR 140: still present
SR 145: still present
SR 150: still present
SR 152: still present
SR 154: still present
SR 156: still present
SR 166: still present
SR 168: still present
SR 178: still present
SR 180: still present
SR 190: still present
SR 195: deleted in 2014

SR 195: became US 95 ca. 1937

SR 198: still present
US 199: still present
US 299: became SR 299 in 1964
US 395: still present
US 399: became SR 33 and SR 119 in 1964
SR 440: became SR 44 ca. 1935
US 466: became SR 46 and SR 58 in 1964
SR 740: became SR 74 and US 395 ca. 1935
