= Arroyo Simi Overhead =

- Coordinates: 34°17′13″N 118°51′53″W
- Carries: 4 lanes of SR 118
- Crosses: Arroyo Simi
- Locale: Moorpark, California
- Owner: Caltrans
- Maintained by: Caltrans
- ID number: 52 0331

Characteristics
- Design: Dual-span viaducts
- Material: Concrete
- Total length: 538 metres (0.334 mi)
- Width: 14 metres (46 ft)
- Clearance above: 13 metres (43 ft)

History
- Constructed by: C. C. Myers (bridges); C. A. Rasmussen (roadwork)
- Construction start: April 19, 1991
- Opened: October 15, 1993; 32 years ago
- Replaces: Los Angeles Avenue

Location
- Interactive map of Arroyo Simi Overhead

The Arroyo Simi Overhead is a tall viaduct in Ventura County, California, that carries State Route 118 (SR 118, Ronald Reagan Freeway) over the Arroyo Simi. At the south end of the bridge, the freeway continues as SR 23. The state routes continue as highways to the west and north respectively. The entire connector, completed in 1993, is 2.2 miles (3.5 km) long and includes seven bridges.

The railroad line between Simi Valley and Moorpark together with a local road also pass under the two main 100-foot-high (30 m) bridges that separately carry the traffic in each direction, each more than 1,400 feet (430 m) long. A wetlands was created as a mitigation measure for the impacts of the construction on the Arroyo Simi. Nearby Moorpark College manages and maintains the site which is used as a nature center by the environmental science program.
