= Buckhorn, California =

Buckhorn is the name of two unincorporated communities in the U.S. state of California:

- Buckhorn, Amador County, California
- Buckhorn, Ventura County, California
