= California State Route 232 =

Highway in California

State Route 232
- Vineyard Avenue
- SR 232 highlighted in red

Route information
- Maintained by Caltrans
- Length: 4.110 mi (6.614 km)

Major junctions
- South end: US 101 in Oxnard
- North end: SR 118 near Saticoy

Location
- Country: United States
- State: California
- Counties: Ventura

Highway system
- State highways in California; Interstate; US; State; Scenic; History; Pre‑1964; Unconstructed; Deleted; Freeways
← SR 231	→ SR 233

State Route 232 (SR 232) is a state highway in the U.S. state of California that runs along Vineyard Avenue in Ventura County, serving as a connector between US 101 in Oxnard and SR 118 near Saticoy.

== Route description ==
Route 232 is defined in section 532, subsection (a), of the California Streets and Highways Code, and that the highway is "from Route 101 near El Rio to Route 118 near Saticoy". While control of the former portion of Route 232 between Route 101 and Oxnard Boulevard in Oxnard has been relinquished by the state to the city, subdivision (b) further mandates that the city must still "maintain within its jurisdiction signs directing motorists to the continuation of Route 232".

SR 232 starts on Vineyard Avenue at the U.S. Route 101 interchange in the city of Oxnard and runs through the unincorporated community of El Rio. SR 232 is totally within the Oxnard Plain, paralleling the nearby Santa Clara River till it ends at Los Angeles Avenue (Route 118).

SR 232 is part of the California Freeway and Expressway System, and is part of the National Highway System, a network of highways that are considered essential to the country's economy, defense, and mobility by the Federal Highway Administration.

== History ==
At the 1932 Summer Olympics near Los Angeles, it hosted part of the road cycling event when it was Vineyard Avenue. Route 154 was defined in 1933 from El Rio to Saticoy; the route was renumbered as SR 232 in the 1964 state highway renumbering. By 2014, the route was redefined to start at US 101, eliminating the section between US 101 and former SR 1 along Oxnard Boulevard in Oxnard that had been relinquished to local control.

== Major intersections ==
Except where prefixed with a letter, postmiles were measured on the road as it was in 1964, based on the alignment that existed at the time, and do not necessarily reflect current mileage. Postmile prefixes include: R reflecting a realignment in the route since then, M indicating a second realignment, L referring to an overlap due to a correction or change, and T indicating postmiles classified as temporary. Segments that remain unconstructed or have been relinquished to local control may be omitted. The entire route is in Ventura County.

Location	Postmile	Destinations	Notes
Oxnard	0.00 (Note: Postmiles are measured from SR 232's original southern end at Oxnard Boulevard (former SR 1), before the segment south of US 101 was deleted and relinquished to local control.)	Vineyard Avenue	Continuation beyond Oxnard Boulevard
Oxnard	0.00	Oxnard Boulevard	Former SR 1; former south end of SR 232
Oxnard	0.44	US 101 (Ventura Freeway) – Ventura, Los Angeles	Interchange; south end of state maintenance; US 101 exit 62A
	R4.11	SR 118 (Los Angeles Avenue) – Saticoy, Santa Paula, Moorpark	North end of SR 232
1.000 mi = 1.609 km; 1.000 km = 0.621 mi
