= California State Route 118 =

Highway in California

State Route 118
- Map of southern California with SR 118 highlighted in red

Route information
- Maintained by Caltrans
- Length: 47.605 mi (76.613 km)

Major junctions
- West end: SR 126 in Ventura
- SR 23 in Moorpark; SR 27 in Chatsworth; I-405 in North Hills; I-5 near San Fernando
- East end: I-210 near San Fernando

Location
- Country: United States
- State: California
- Counties: Ventura, Los Angeles

Highway system
- State highways in California; Interstate; US; State; Scenic; History; Pre‑1964; Unconstructed; Deleted; Freeways
← SR 116	→ SR 119

State Route 118 (SR 118) is a state highway in the U.S. state of California that runs west to east through Ventura and Los Angeles counties. It travels from State Route 126 at the eastern edge of Ventura immediately northwest of Saticoy, then through Saticoy, in Ventura County east to Interstate 210 near Lake View Terrace in Los Angeles. SR 118 crosses the Santa Susana Pass and the northern rim of the San Fernando Valley along its route.

== Route description ==
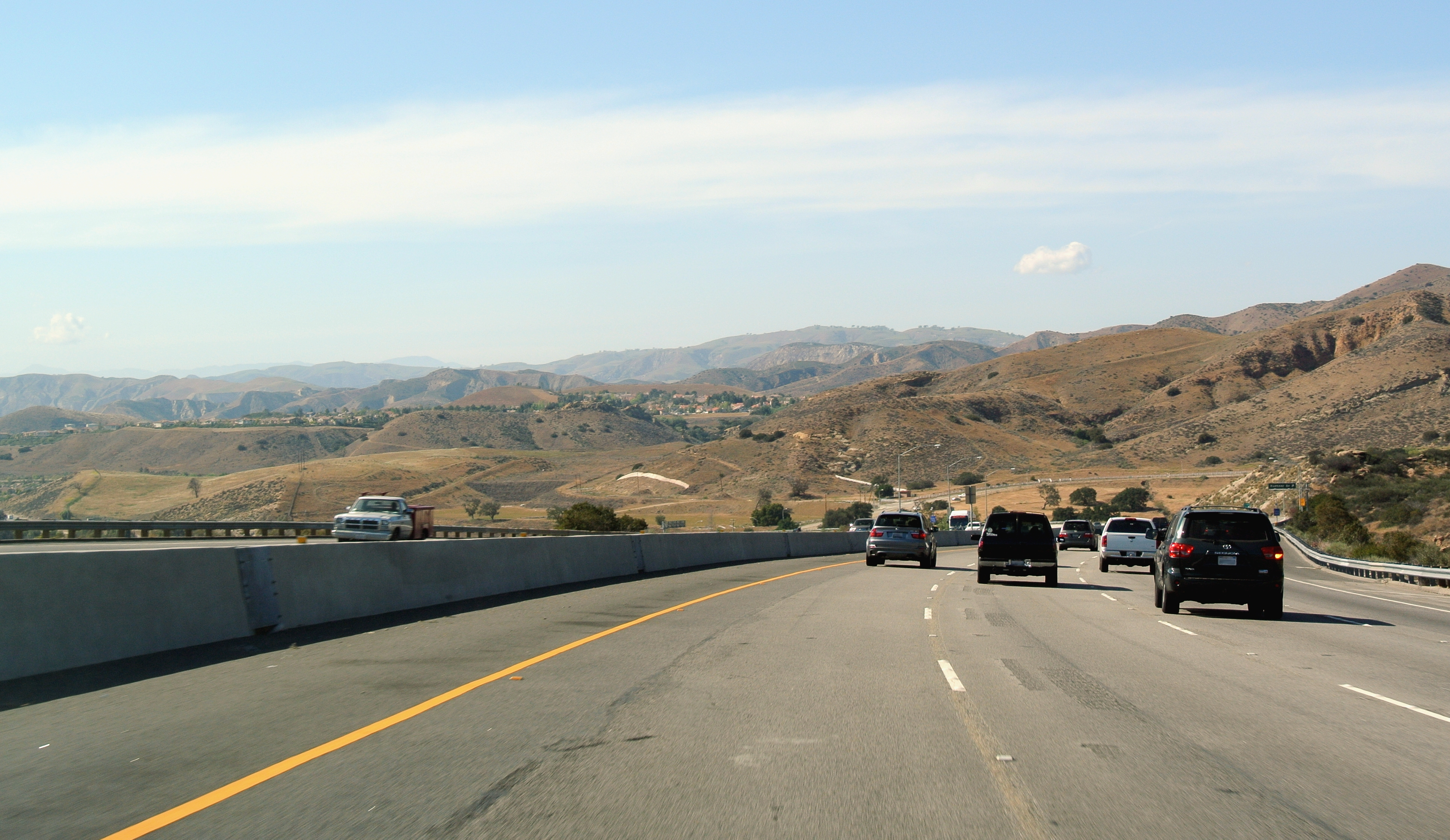
SR 118 east of Simi Valley as seen by westbound traffic

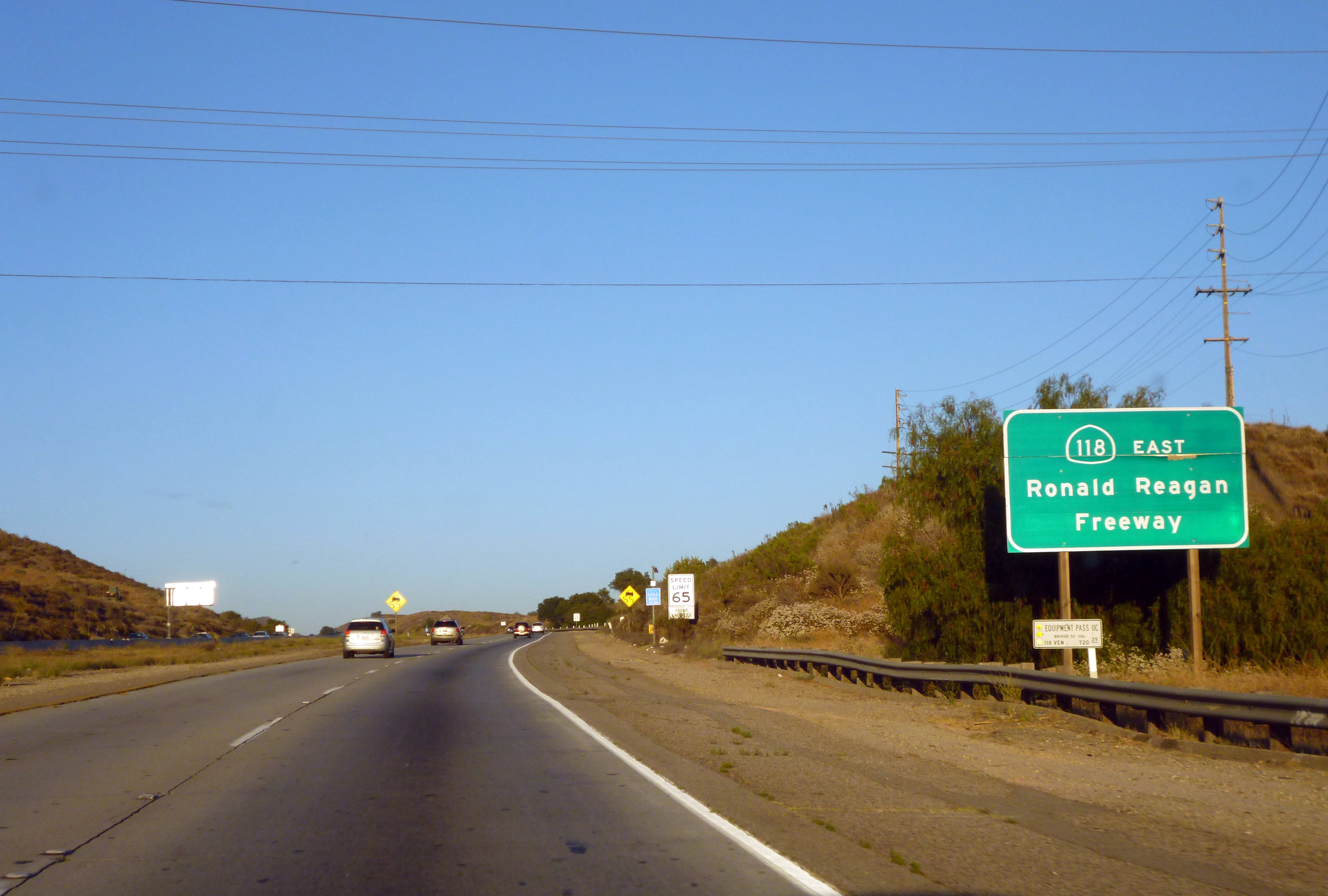
Signage referencing the Ronald Reagan Freeway on SR 118 eastbound near Simi Valley.

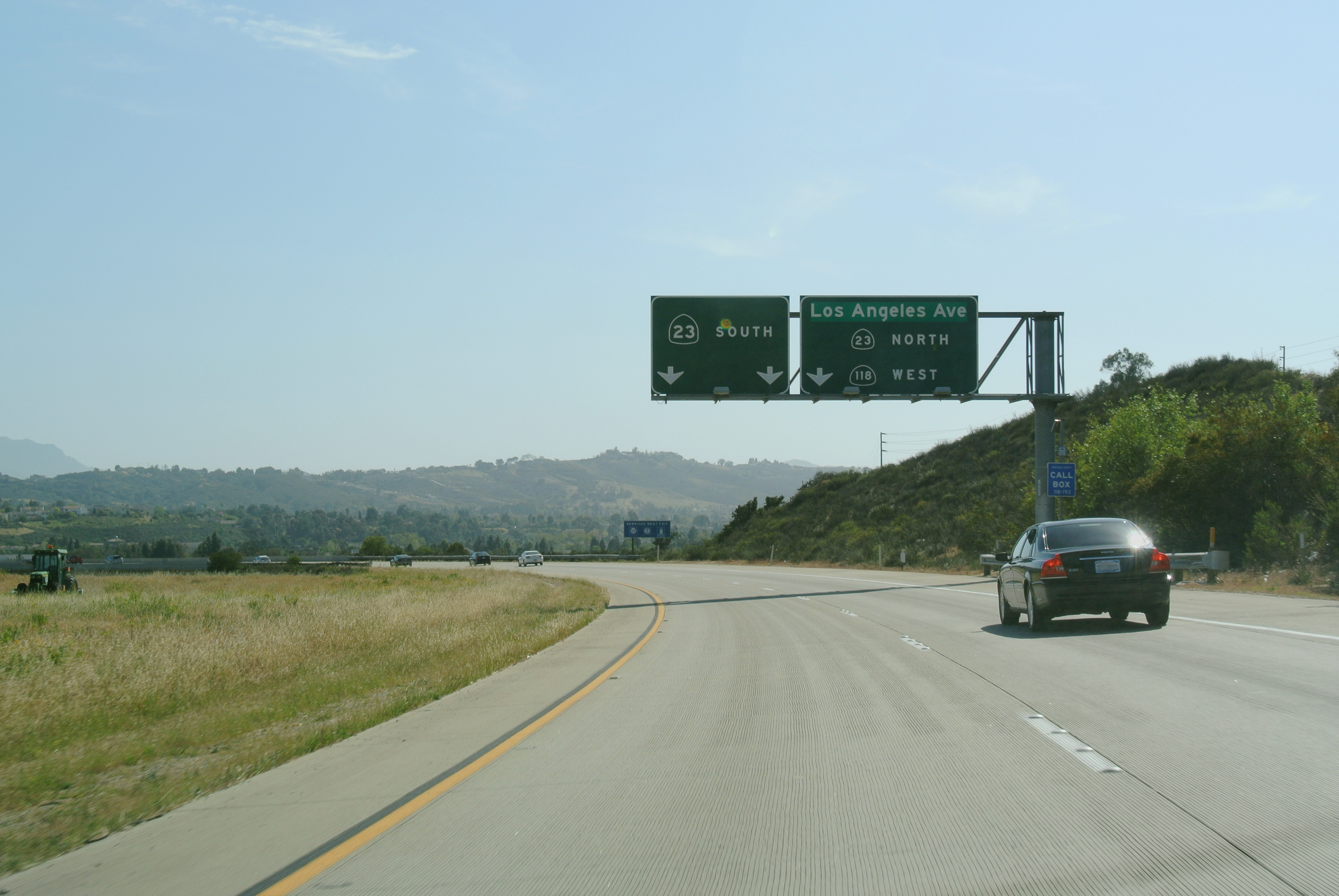
SR 118 southbound just before the interchange with SR 23 in Moorpark

Route 118 is defined in section 418 of the California Streets and Highways Code:

Route 118 is from:
(a) Route 126 near Saticoy to Route 210 near San Fernando.
(b) Route 210 near Sunland to Route 249 north of La Canada [sic].

Route 118 was not fully constructed to extend east from Route 210 to near La Cañada Flintridge as it is defined, as was Route 249.

SR 118 has two distinguishable sections, which connect at the intersection with State Route 23. The western section of SR 118 goes through the more rural areas of Ventura County. SR 118 begins at an intersection with SR 126 in Ventura as Wells Road and heads southeast, crossing the Santa Clara River as Los Angeles Avenue and intersecting SR 232 in unincorporated Ventura County. The highway continues southeast before intersecting Santa Clara Avenue, where SR 118/Los Angeles Avenue turns east and passes north of Camarillo. In the community of Somis, the highway intersects SR 34. The road continues into Moorpark, where it intersects SR 23 and runs concurrently with that road. After passing Spring Road, the SR 23/SR 118 concurrency continues as New Los Angeles Avenue to a freeway interchange, where SR 118 heads north, and SR 23 heads south.

The eastern section is an urban freeway that starts in the cities of Moorpark and Simi Valley, and ends in Los Angeles. The SR 118 freeway initially travels north, but quickly turns east, passing near Moorpark College, before entering the Simi Valley city limits. SR 118 continues through Simi Valley before entering Corriganville Regional Park and crossing into Los Angeles County and the Los Angeles city limits. The freeway has an HOV lane between here and Interstate 5. In Los Angeles, SR 118 passes through Santa Susana Pass State Historic Park before passing through Chatsworth and interchanging with SR 27. SR 118 subsequently goes through Porter Ranch and Granada Hills before intersecting with I-405 and I-5. Following this, SR 118 goes through Pacoima before terminating at an interchange with the Foothill Freeway.

SR 118 is part of the California Freeway and Expressway System, and is part of the National Highway System, a network of highways that are considered essential to the country's economy, defense, and mobility by the Federal Highway Administration. SR 118 is eligible to be included in the State Scenic Highway System, but it is not officially designated as a scenic highway by the California Department of Transportation. The freeway portion of Route 118 between Moorpark and Lake View Terrace was originally named the Simi Valley-San Fernando Valley Freeway before it was designated as the Ronald Reagan Freeway in 1994. It was renamed in honor of Ronald Reagan, the 33rd Governor of California and the 40th President of the United States, due to the location of his presidential library in Simi Valley.

== History ==
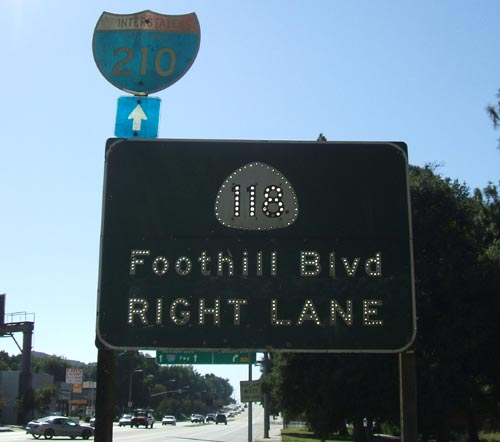
An old SR 118 shield on the relinquished segment on Foothill Boulevard, east of I-210 in Sunland. Note that California presently uses green shields, while this one dates to the 1950s or 1960s. This sign has since been removed.

SR 118 used to extend past I-210 on Foothill Boulevard through Sunland-Tujunga, La Crescenta and La Cañada, then across the Arroyo Seco into Pasadena, where SR 118 ran on Lincoln Avenue and Fair Oaks Avenue, ending at Colorado Boulevard (US 66 Alternate). The original routing across the Arroyo Seco ran along La Cañada Verdugo Road (now Oak Grove Drive), which crossed the arroyo along the crest of Devil's Gate Dam. In 1957, the first segment of the Foothill Freeway was completed between Montana and Cañada Streets in Pasadena and Foothill Blvd and Michigan Avenue in La Cañada. SR 118 ran along this short freeway until 1974, when the current Foothill Freeway alignment over the Arroyo Seco was completed further to the south. SR 118 was then truncated to its current terminus with I-210 near San Fernando.

Before the freeway was built, the route went through Simi Valley on Los Angeles Avenue and Kuehner Drive, then crossed into the San Fernando Valley on Santa Susana Pass Road. The eastern segment used Devonshire Street through the San Fernando Valley, then cut through San Fernando along Brand and Maclay Streets before joining Foothill Boulevard in Sylmar. During the 1932 Summer Olympics, it hosted part of the road cycling event. The SR 118 freeway began construction in 1968 and the last section of freeway opened in 1979. The segment of freeway between Balboa Boulevard and Tampa Avenue was one of the last freeway segments to be built in the Los Angeles area. As a result of the Northridge earthquake in January 1994, a section of the highway between I-405 and I-210 was closed for over one month while damage to an overpass was repaired. The Porter Ranch Drive interchange is relatively new; before it was constructed, that interchange connected to a closed Winnetka Avenue and a Park and Ride lot.

Route 118 from Route 23 to Route 210 was named the Simi Valley-San Fernando Valley Freeway by Assembly Concurrent Resolution 145, Chapter 185 in 1970. In December 1994, the portion of Route 118 constructed to freeway standards was renamed The Ronald Reagan Freeway. The original proposal for this name was introduced by California Assembly Speaker Willie Brown on August 30, 1994 and amended August 31, 1994, as State Assembly Concurrent Resolution 156; however, this version of the bill died on the desk in November 1994. The name was reintroduced by State Senators Lockyer, Maddy, and Wright as State Senate Resolution 7, amended and enrolled December 5, 1994. Since it was neither a concurrent resolution nor a joint resolution, it was not filed with the Secretary of State. The rationale for choosing this name for State Route 118 is that the western end of the highway, at the time the bill was passed, is very close to the Ronald Reagan Presidential Library.

There is an additional unconstructed segment of SR 118, defined in 1959 in the California Streets and Highways Code, extending from its current terminus with I-210 to a planned SR 249, located within the Angeles National Forest. This appears to have been roughly planned to run primarily along Big Tujunga Canyon between Foothill Boulevard and Los Angeles County Route N3, Angeles Forest Highway, which is the current traversable routing for unconstructed SR 249.

== Major intersections ==
Except where prefixed with a letter, postmiles were measured on the road as it was in 1964, based on the alignment that existed at the time, and do not necessarily reflect current mileage. R reflects a realignment in the route since then, M indicates a second realignment, L refers to an overlap due to a correction or change, and T indicates postmiles classified as temporary. Segments that remain unconstructed or have been relinquished to local control may be omitted. The numbers reset at county lines; the start and end postmiles in each county are given in the county column.

County	Location	Postmile	Exit	Destinations	Notes
Ventura; VEN 0.52-R32.60	Ventura	0.52		Wells Road	Continuation beyond SR 126
Ventura; VEN 0.52-R32.60	Ventura	0.52		SR 126 (Santa Paula Freeway) – Ventura, Santa Paula, Santa Clarita	Interchange; western terminus; SR 126 exit 5
Ventura; VEN 0.52-R32.60	Ventura	R1.02		Telephone Road, Aster Street	
Ventura; VEN 0.52-R32.60		2.20		SR 232 south (Vineyard Avenue) to US 101 – Oxnard	Northern terminus of SR 232
Ventura; VEN 0.52-R32.60		4.16		Santa Clara Avenue	Connects to Rice Avenue / SR 1
Ventura; VEN 0.52-R32.60	Somis	10.92		SR 34 west (Somis Road)	Eastern terminus of SR 34
Ventura; VEN 0.52-R32.60		17.49		Grimes Canyon Road	
Ventura; VEN 0.52-R32.60	Moorpark	R17.49		SR 23 north (Moorpark Avenue) – Fillmore	Western end of SR 23 concurrency; SR 23 north follows Moorpark Avenue north; SR 118 west follows Los Angeles Avenue west
Ventura; VEN 0.52-R32.60	Moorpark	T18.21	18A	SR 23 south (Moorpark Freeway)	Interchange; eastern end of SR 23 concurrency; SR 23 north/SR 118 west follows SR 23 exit 20A and SR 118 exit 18B; SR 118 east follows SR 23 north exit 20B
Ventura; VEN 0.52-R32.60	Moorpark		Western end of Ronald Reagan Freeway		
Ventura; VEN 0.52-R32.60	Moorpark	T18.44	Arroyo Simi Overhead		
Ventura; VEN 0.52-R32.60	Moorpark	T19.13	19A	Princeton Avenue	
Ventura; VEN 0.52-R32.60	Moorpark	T19.98	19B	Collins Drive	
Ventura; VEN 0.52-R32.60	Simi Valley	R23.02	22	Madera Road	Signed as exits 22A (south) and 22B (north) westbound
Ventura; VEN 0.52-R32.60	Simi Valley	R23.82	23	First Street – Simi Valley	
Ventura; VEN 0.52-R32.60	Simi Valley	R24.81	24	Erringer Road	
Ventura; VEN 0.52-R32.60	Simi Valley	R25.81	25	Sycamore Drive	
Ventura; VEN 0.52-R32.60	Simi Valley	R27.30	27	Tapo Canyon Road	
Ventura; VEN 0.52-R32.60	Simi Valley	R28.82	28	Stearns Street	
Ventura; VEN 0.52-R32.60	Simi Valley	R29.56	29	Yosemite Avenue	
Ventura; VEN 0.52-R32.60	Simi Valley	R30.52	30	Kuehner Drive	
Ventura; VEN 0.52-R32.60	Simi Valley	R32.43	32	Rocky Peak Road	
Ventura–Los Angeles county line	Simi Valley–Los Angeles line	R32.60 R0.00	Santa Susana Pass		
Los Angeles; LA R0.00-R14.08	Los Angeles	R1.80	34	SR 27 south (Topanga Canyon Boulevard)	Northern terminus of SR 27
Los Angeles; LA R0.00-R14.08	Los Angeles	R2.68	35	De Soto Avenue	
Los Angeles; LA R0.00-R14.08	Los Angeles	R3.86	36	Porter Ranch Drive	
Los Angeles; LA R0.00-R14.08	Los Angeles	R4.64	37	Tampa Avenue	
Los Angeles; LA R0.00-R14.08	Los Angeles	R5.80	38	Reseda Boulevard	
Los Angeles; LA R0.00-R14.08	Los Angeles	R7.80	40A	Balboa Boulevard	Signed as exit 40 eastbound
Los Angeles; LA R0.00-R14.08	Los Angeles	R8.34	40B	Hayvenhurst Avenue	Westbound exit and eastbound entrance
Los Angeles; LA R0.00-R14.08	Los Angeles	R9.04	41	Woodley Avenue	Eastbound exit and westbound entrance
Los Angeles; LA R0.00-R14.08	Los Angeles	R9.81	42A	I-405 south (San Diego Freeway) – Santa Monica	Signed as exit 42B westbound; I-405 north exit 71A; former SR 7
Los Angeles; LA R0.00-R14.08	Los Angeles	R9.81	42A	I-405 north (San Diego Freeway) – Sacramento	Eastbound exit and westbound entrance; I-405 south exit 71; former SR 7
Los Angeles; LA R0.00-R14.08	Los Angeles	R10.07	42B	Sepulveda Boulevard	Signed as exit 42A westbound
Los Angeles; LA R0.00-R14.08	Los Angeles	R11.45	44A	I-5 south (Golden State Freeway) – Los Angeles	I-5 north exit 156A
Los Angeles; LA R0.00-R14.08	Los Angeles	R11.45	44A	I-5 north (Golden State Freeway) – Sacramento	Westbound exit and eastbound entrance; eastbound access is via exit 44B; I-5 south exit 156B
Los Angeles; LA R0.00-R14.08	Los Angeles	R11.57	44B	Laurel Canyon Boulevard to I-5 north – Sacramento	Eastbound exit and westbound entrance
Los Angeles; LA R0.00-R14.08	Los Angeles	R12.39	44C	San Fernando Road – San Fernando	Signed as exit 44B westbound; former US 6 / US 99
Los Angeles; LA R0.00-R14.08	Los Angeles	R13.18	45	Glenoaks Boulevard	
Los Angeles; LA R0.00-R14.08	Los Angeles	R14.08	46A	I-210 west (Foothill Freeway) – Sacramento	Eastern terminus; I-210 east exit 6A, west exit 6B
Los Angeles; LA R0.00-R14.08	Los Angeles	R14.08	46B	I-210 east (Foothill Freeway) – Pasadena	Eastern terminus; I-210 east exit 6A, west exit 6B
1.000 mi = 1.609 km; 1.000 km = 0.621 mi: Concurrency terminus; Incomplete access
