= California State Route 126 =

Highway in California

State Route 126
- SR 126 highlighted in red

Route information
- Maintained by Caltrans
- Length: 40.455 mi (65.106 km)
- Existed: 1934–present

Major junctions
- West end: US 101 / SR 1 in Ventura
- SR 150 in Santa Paula; SR 23 in Fillmore
- East end: I-5 at the Castaic Junction-Santa Clarita border

Location
- Country: United States
- State: California
- Counties: Ventura, Los Angeles

Highway system
- State highways in California; Interstate; US; State; Scenic; History; Pre‑1964; Unconstructed; Deleted; Freeways
← SR 125	→ SR 127

State Route 126 (SR 126) is a state highway in the U.S. state of California that serves Ventura and Los Angeles counties. The route runs from U.S. Route 101 in Ventura to Interstate 5 at the Castaic Junction-Santa Clarita border through the Santa Clara River Valley. The highway is an important connector highway in Ventura County, and serves as an alternate route into the Santa Clarita Valley, and (via Interstate 5) the San Fernando Valley area of Los Angeles and the High Desert of Antelope Valley.

== Route description ==
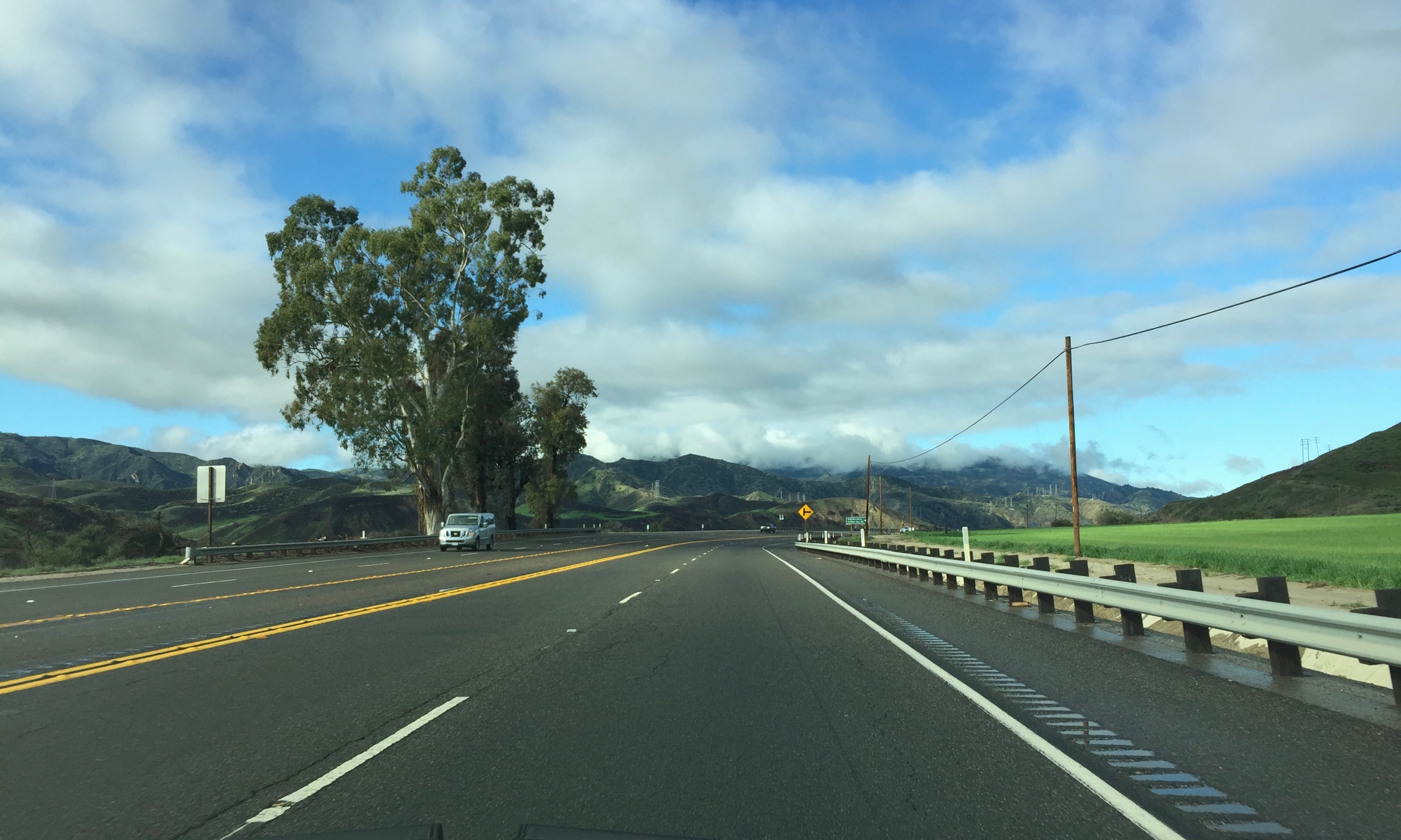
SR 126 westbound as seen near the Ventura County line

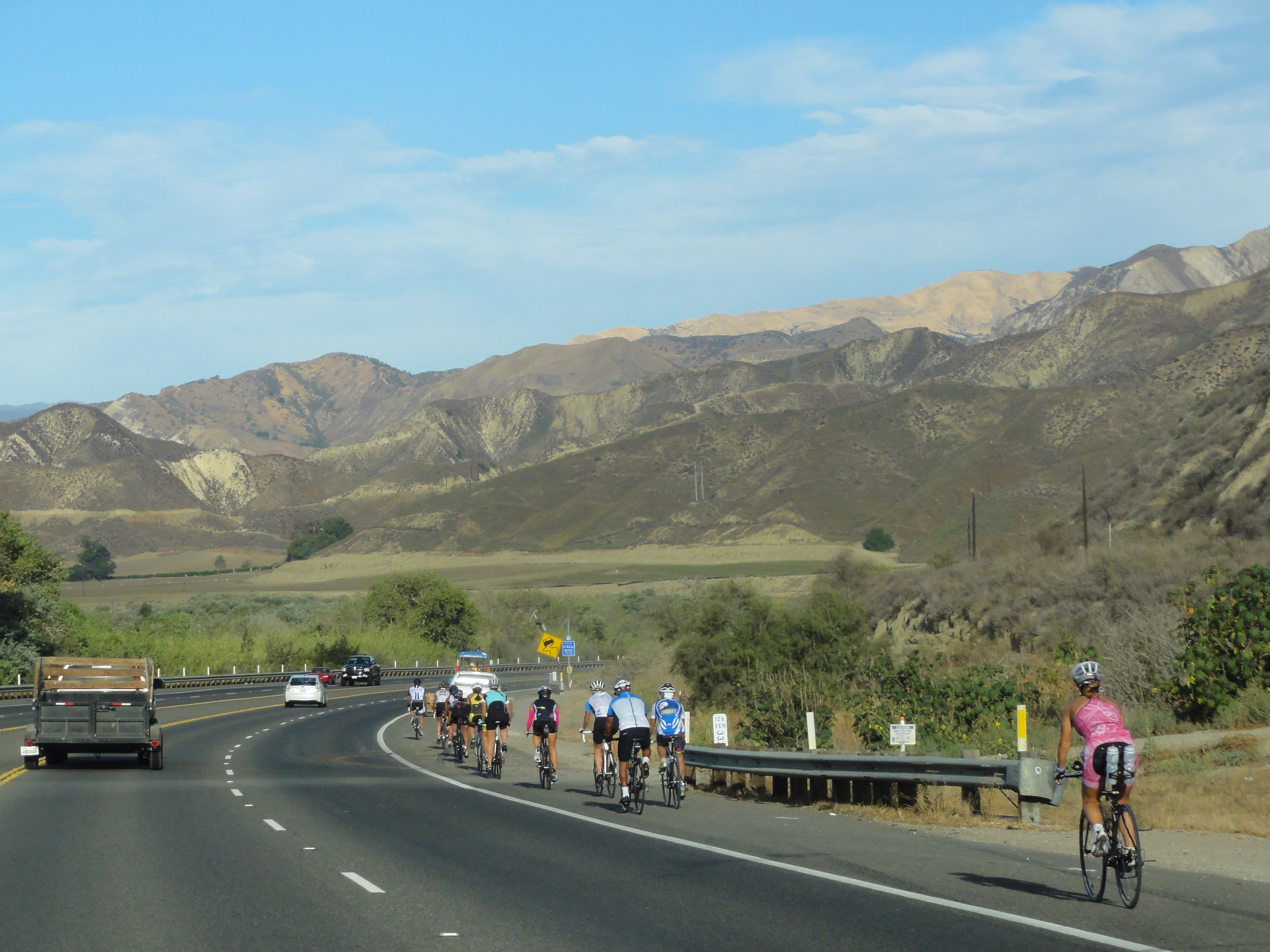
Cyclists along SR 126 near Piru

Route 126 is defined in section 426, subdivision (a), of the California Streets and Highways Code, and that the highway is "from Route 101 near Ventura to Route 5". Subdivision (b) designates Route 126 as the Santa Paula Freeway. Control of the former eastern segment of Route 126 in Santa Clarita to Route 14 was relinquished by the state to the city, and subdivision (c) mandates that it is no longer eligible to be re-adopted as a state highway.

SR 126 generally follows the Santa Clara River through the valley, passing through the towns of Fillmore and Santa Paula. The freeway portion of the highway, known as the Santa Paula Freeway, begins in Ventura at U.S. 101. It proceeds northeast through the city, interchanging with the western end of SR 118 at a grade-separated interchange. SR 126 then passes through areas of agriculture, orchards, and the Saticoy Oil Field to its northeast, continuing through Santa Paula, where it intersects SR 150. The freeway portion terminates at Hallock Drive. SR 126 continues as a highway thereafter, known as Telegraph Road. This section extends through Fillmore as Ventura Street, where SR 126 meets SR 23. Following this, SR 126 as Telegraph Road encounters the community of Buckhorn, as well as the edge of Piru and the important historical Rancho Camulos.

The stretch of SR 126 between Santa Paula and the Los Angeles County line has seen an unusually high amount of traffic fatalities and other injurious accidents. Head-on collisions were very frequent on the older, curvy, two-laned sections, earning this portion of the road its nickname of "Blood Alley". An article from the Los Angeles Times in 1996 noted 34 fatalities between 1990 and 1994. Though the highway has since been improved in most areas, traffic fatalities are still quite common.

In Los Angeles County, SR 126 is known as Henry Mayo Drive, named after Henry Mayo Newhall. The highway continues east to an interchange with the Golden State Freeway (I-5). At this interchange, the SR 126 designation terminates, and the road continues into Santa Clarita as Newhall Ranch Road.

SR 126 is part of the California Freeway and Expressway System and is part of the National Highway System, a network of highways that are considered essential to the country's economy, defense, and mobility by the Federal Highway Administration. SR 126 is eligible to be included in the State Scenic Highway System, but it is not officially designated as a scenic highway by the California Department of Transportation.

== History ==
=== Original plans ===
In 1958, the freeway was originally planned to follow the northern banks of the Santa Clara River, connecting US 101 to US 99 (I-5 today) and US 6 (SR 14 today) through what is now Santa Clarita. In the mid-1960s, construction of the 4-lane freeway began immediately northeast of Oxnard at US 101 and immediately east of Santa Clarita at US 6.

=== Freeway revolts ===
In the face of anti-development pressure from Ventura County citizens, and suffering from severe financial problems as a result of the 1971 Sylmar earthquake and the late-1970s California tax revolt, Caltrans abandoned its plans. The freeway, which by then had reached Santa Paula, terminates at a four-way intersection at Hallock Drive immediately east of the city. From there, a 4-lane undivided highway continues on toward I-5. The eastern approach of SR 126 was abandoned midway through the interchange's construction at SR 14. Two long on-ramps and a large graded plateau are all that remain of the approach.

The only remnants of these plans are the two long ramps to and from SR 14 at the Sierra Highway interchange (exit 6A) in Santa Clarita, and Newhall Ranch Road, a six to eight-lane divided local road that continues from the current terminus of SR 126 at Interstate 5 and roughly follows the original 1958 route to just past Bouquet Canyon Road on the north side of the Santa Clara River. Newhall Ranch Road changes to Golden Valley Road 1.75 miles east of Bouquet Canyon Road, and continues to SR 14, roughly one mile south of the original planned terminus of SR 126.

=== 1984 Summer Olympics ===
The 1984 Summer Olympics Organizing Committee was allowed to close the freeway portion between Ventura and Santa Paula for cycling practice for the 100 Kilometer Team Trials on two consecutive Thursdays.

=== Cross Valley Connector ===
On March 27, 2010, the City of Santa Clarita completed the decade-long Cross Valley Connector (CVC) project, which sought to connect SR 126 directly to SR 14 roughly along the original route alignment. The city-maintained route is named Newhall Ranch Road on the western segment, and Golden Valley Road on the eastern segment. The two segments meet at the intersection of Newhall Ranch Road and Golden Valley Road, where Golden Valley Road turns and continues northeast.

=== Commerce Center Drive ===
In 2017, Caltrans began construction along the 1.75-mile (2.82 km) eastern end of SR 126, upgrading the 6-lane divided highway to an 8-lane freeway. A new interchange replaced the traffic signal at Commerce Center Drive. The interchange is sequentially numbered as exit 13, as exit 12 is 27 miles (43 km) away in Santa Paula near the eastern end of the Santa Paula Freeway section of SR 126. It is the only known instance of a sequential numbered exit in California. If the state's normal exit numbering system had properly been applied, Commerce Center Drive should have been numbered as exit 39 instead, as it is approximately 39 miles (63 km) away from SR 126's western terminus.

== Major intersections ==
Except where prefixed with a letter, postmiles were measured on the road as it was in 1964, based on the alignment that existed at the time, and do not necessarily reflect current mileage. Postmile prefixes include: R reflecting a realignment in the route since then, M indicating a second realignment, L referring to an overlap due to a correction or change, and T indicating postmiles classified as temporary. Segments that remain unconstructed or have been relinquished to local control may be omitted. The numbers reset at county lines; the start and end postmiles in each county are given in the county column.

County	Location	Postmile	Exit	Destinations	Notes
Ventura; VEN 0.00-R34.63	Ventura	0.00	1A	US 101 north (Ventura Freeway / SR 1 north) – San Francisco	No direct access to US 101 south; west end of SR 126; US 101 north exit 66A, south exit 66
Ventura; VEN 0.00-R34.63	Ventura	0.00	1B	Main Street (US 101 Bus.)	Westbound exit and eastbound entrance; former US 101; serves Ventura County Medical Center
Ventura; VEN 0.00-R34.63	Ventura	1.45	1C	Victoria Avenue to US 101 south (Ventura Freeway / SR 1 south)	Signed as exit 1 eastbound
Ventura; VEN 0.00-R34.63	Ventura	2.80	3	Kimball Road	
Ventura; VEN 0.00-R34.63	Ventura	R5.03	5	SR 118 east (Wells Road) – Saticoy	Western terminus of SR 118
Ventura; VEN 0.00-R34.63		R8.91	9	Briggs Road	
Ventura; VEN 0.00-R34.63	Santa Paula	R10.38	10	Peck Road	
Ventura; VEN 0.00-R34.63	Santa Paula	R11.37	11	Palm Avenue	
Ventura; VEN 0.00-R34.63	Santa Paula	R12.04	12	SR 150 west (10th Street) – Santa Paula	Eastern terminus of SR 150; serves Santa Paula Hospital
Ventura; VEN 0.00-R34.63	Santa Paula	R13.25	East end of freeway		
Ventura; VEN 0.00-R34.63	Fillmore	21.14		SR 23 south (A Street) – Moorpark	Northern terminus of SR 23
Los Angeles; LA R0.00-R5.83		R4.33	West end of freeway		
Los Angeles; LA R0.00-R5.83		R4.89	13	Commerce Center Drive	
Los Angeles; LA R0.00-R5.83		R5.46	40	Castaic Junction (The Old Road)	Closed interchange; former US 99; accessible via exit 13
Los Angeles; LA R0.00-R5.83		R5.60	East end of freeway		
Los Angeles; LA R0.00-R5.83	Santa Clarita	R5.83		I-5 north (Golden State Freeway) – Sacramento	Interchange; east end of SR 126; I-5 exit 172
Los Angeles; LA R0.00-R5.83	Santa Clarita	R5.83		I-5 south (Golden State Freeway) – Los Angeles	Interchange; east end of SR 126; I-5 exit 172
Los Angeles; LA R0.00-R5.83	Santa Clarita	R5.83		Newhall Ranch Road	Continuation beyond I-5; connects to SR 14 via Golden Valley Road
1.000 mi = 1.609 km; 1.000 km = 0.621 mi: Closed/former; Incomplete access
