= California State Route 213 =

Highway in California

State Route 213
- Western Avenue
- SR 213 highlighted in red

Route information
- Maintained by Caltrans
- Length: 9.984 mi (16.068 km)

Major junctions
- South end: 25th Street in San Pedro
- SR 1 in Harbor City
- North end: I-405 in Torrance

Location
- Country: United States
- State: California
- Counties: Los Angeles

Highway system
- State highways in California; Interstate; US; State; Scenic; History; Pre‑1964; Unconstructed; Deleted; Freeways
← SR 211	→ SR 214

State Route 213 (SR 213) is a state highway in the U.S. state of California, in Los Angeles County. The approximately 9.98-mile (16.06 km) route runs along Western Avenue between 25th Street in San Pedro in the south and Interstate 405 (San Diego Freeway) in Torrance in the north.

== Route description ==
Route 213 is defined in section 513 of the California Streets and Highways Code, and that the highway is "from 25th Street in San Pedro to Route 405 via Western Avenue".

Signage of SR 213 actually begins at the intersection of Western Avenue with Paseo del Mar at Royal Palms County Beach next to the Pacific Ocean. From here, the route follows Western Avenue northeast along the edge of White Point Park to its intersection with 25th Street, where the legal definition of SR 213 begins.

SR 213 continues north through San Pedro before briefly entering Rancho Palos Verdes and passing by a naval reservation. Western Avenue then enters Lomita before returning to the Los Angeles city limits in the community of Harbor City. SR 213 intersects with SR 1 before forming the eastern boundary of the city of Torrance and the western boundary of Harbor Gateway. SR 213 is signed for a few more miles north to I-405, where the route ends.

SR 213 is part of the National Highway System, a network of highways that are considered essential to the country's economy, defense, and mobility by the Federal Highway Administration.

== History ==
Route 291 was defined by the California State Legislature as a highway from 25th Street in San Pedro to Route 158, along Western Avenue. The route was redesignated as SR 213 in the 1964 state highway renumbering from 25th Street to I-405.

== Major intersections ==
Except where prefixed with a letter, postmiles were measured on the road as it was in 1964, based on the alignment that existed at the time, and do not necessarily reflect current mileage. Postmile prefixes include: R reflecting a realignment in the route since then, M indicating a second realignment, L referring to an overlap due to a correction or change, and T indicating postmiles classified as temporary. Segments that remain unconstructed or have been relinquished to local control may be omitted. The entire route is in Los Angeles County.

Location	Postmile	Destinations	Notes
San Pedro	0.00	Western Avenue	Continuation beyond 25th Street
San Pedro	0.00	25th Street	South end of SR 213
Lomita	4.31	Palos Verdes Drive North	
Los Angeles	5.09	SR 1 (Pacific Coast Highway) – Long Beach, Santa Monica	
Los Angeles	5.67	Lomita Boulevard	
Los Angeles–Torrance line	7.00	Sepulveda Boulevard	
Los Angeles–Torrance line	7.98	Carson Street	
Los Angeles–Torrance line	9.98	I-405	North end of SR 213
Los Angeles–Torrance line	9.98	Western Avenue	Continuation beyond I-405
1.000 mi = 1.609 km; 1.000 km = 0.621 mi
