= California State Route 233 =

Highway in California

State Route 233
- Robertson Boulevard
- SR 233 highlighted in red

Route information
- Maintained by Caltrans
- Length: 3.882 mi (6.247 km)

Major junctions
- South end: SR 152 near Chowchilla
- North end: SR 99 near Chowchilla

Location
- Country: United States
- State: California
- Counties: Madera

Highway system
- State highways in California; Interstate; US; State; Scenic; History; Pre‑1964; Unconstructed; Deleted; Freeways
← SR 232	→ SR 234

State Route 233 (SR 233) is a state highway in the U.S. state of California. It serves as an alternate route between State Route 152 and State Route 99 in Madera County, running along Robertson Boulevard through the center of Chowchilla instead of bypassing the city. Drivers going from eastbound SR 152 to northbound SR 99 must use SR 233 since there is no such direct ramp at the 99/152 interchange.

== Route description ==
Route 233 is defined in section 533 of the California Streets and Highways Code, and that the highway is "from Route 152 to Route 99 at Chowchilla via Robertson Boulevard".

SR 233 begins at an interchange with SR 152 in Madera County. Past the western terminus, the road continues as Robertson Boulevard. The road heads northeast through farmland and desert along with some development on two-lane undivided Robertson Boulevard, entering the city of Chowchilla. In Chowchilla, SR 233 widens to four lanes and passes through residential and commercial areas of the town. The route becomes a divided highway and crosses a Union Pacific railroad line before coming to its eastern terminus at an interchange with SR 99 just northeast of town. The road continues east as Avenue 26 towards Hensley Lake past the interchange.

SR 233 is part of the National Highway System, a network of highways that are considered essential to the country's economy, defense, and mobility by the Federal Highway Administration.

== Major intersections ==
Except where prefixed with a letter, postmiles were measured on the road as it was in 1964, based on the alignment that existed at the time, and do not necessarily reflect current mileage. Postmile prefixes include: R reflecting a realignment in the route since then, M indicating a second realignment, L referring to an overlap due to a correction or change, and T indicating postmiles classified as temporary. Segments that remain unconstructed or have been relinquished to local control may be omitted. The entire route is in Madera County.

Location	Postmile	Destinations	Notes
	0.01	Robertson Boulevard	Continuation beyond SR 152
	0.01	SR 152 – Los Banos, Gilroy	Interchange; south end of SR 233
Chowchilla	3.59	Chowchilla Boulevard	Former US 99
	3.89	SR 99	Interchange; north end of SR 233; SR 99 exit 170
	3.89	Robertson Boulevard (Avenue 26)	Continuation beyond SR 99
1.000 mi = 1.609 km; 1.000 km = 0.621 mi
