= California State Route 23 =

Highway in California

State Route 23
- SR 23 highlighted in red

Route information
- Maintained by Caltrans
- Length: 32.030 mi (51.547 km) SR 23 is broken into pieces, and the length does not reflect the US 101 and SR 118 overlaps that would be required to make the route continuous.

Major junctions
- South end: SR 1 in Malibu
- US 101 in Thousand Oaks; SR 118 in Moorpark
- North end: SR 126 in Fillmore

Location
- Country: United States
- State: California
- Counties: Los Angeles, Ventura

Highway system
- State highways in California; Interstate; US; State; Scenic; History; Pre‑1964; Unconstructed; Deleted; Freeways
← SR 22	→ SR 24

State Route 23 (SR 23) is a state highway in the U.S. state of California that connects the Pacific coast and the Santa Monica Mountains to the Conejo and Santa Clara River valleys. It runs from Pacific Coast Highway (State Route 1) in Malibu in Los Angeles County to Ventura Street (State Route 126) in Fillmore in Ventura County.

== Route description ==
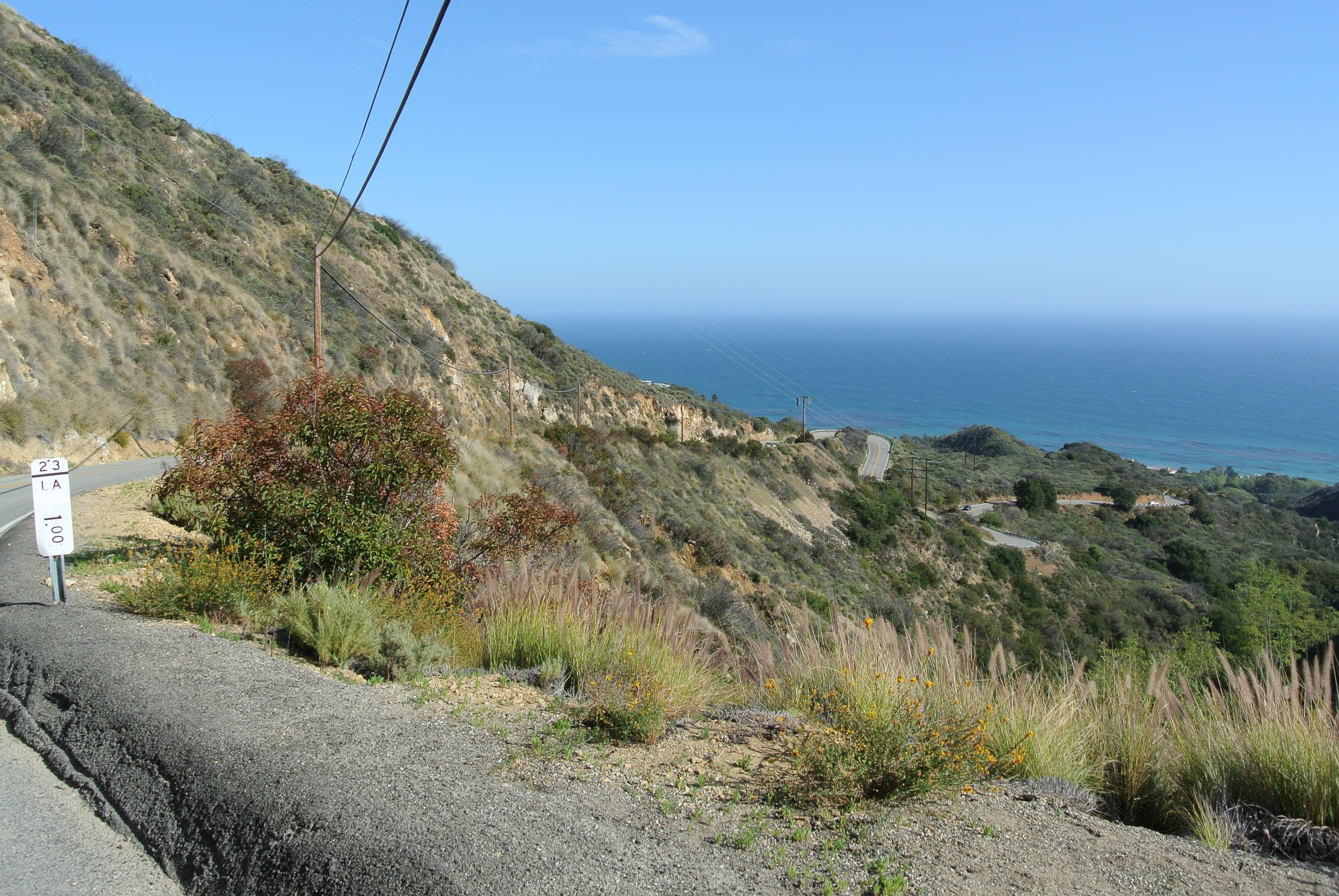
First mile of SR 23 as seen from the Santa Monica Mountains.

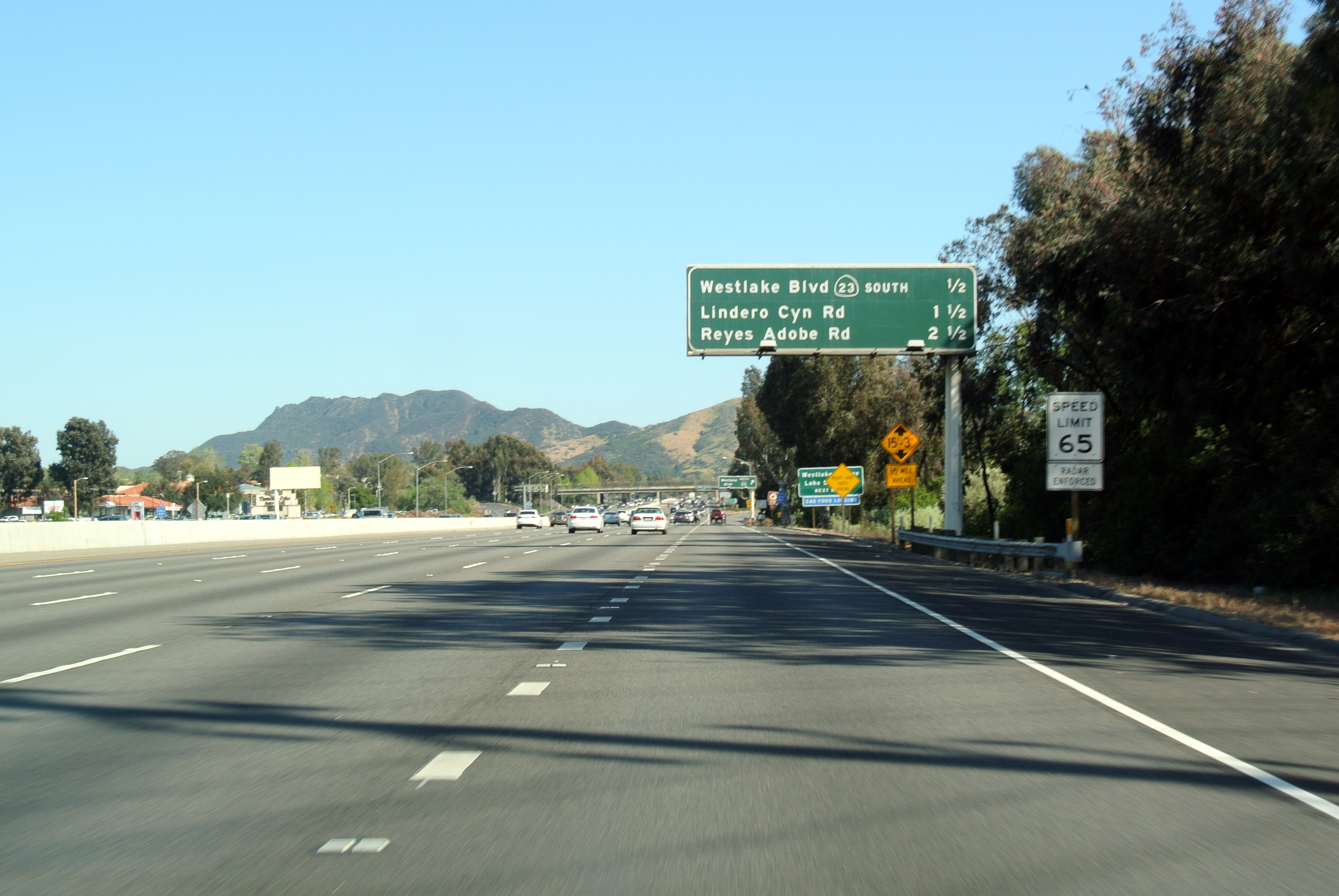
Overlap SR 23/US 101 (Ventura Freeway), seen towards east/south

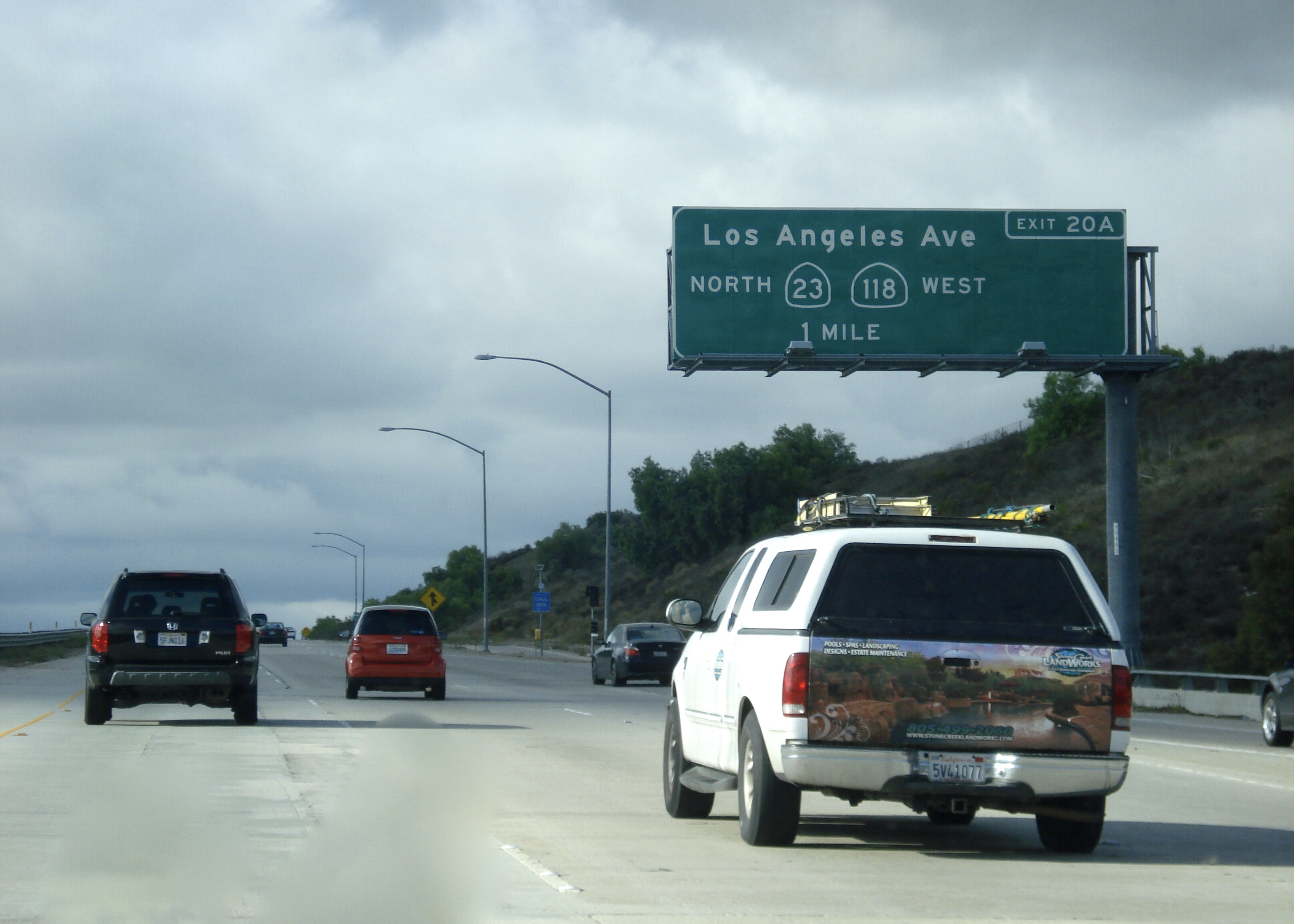
SR 23 north before it reaches SR 118 near Moorpark

Route 23 is defined in section 323 of the California Streets and Highways Code. The definition omits the concurrencies with other routes instead of duplicating those segments in those other routes' definitions in the code:

Route 22 is from:
(a) Route 1 near Aliso Canyon to Route 101.
(b) Route 101 in Thousand Oaks to Route 118.
(c) Route 118 to Route 126 near Fillmore.

SR 23 consists of three distinct sections. The southern section begins as Decker Canyon Road near Trancas in Malibu, where SR 23 intersects with the Pacific Coast Highway (State Route 1), or "PCH." This portion provides numerous vistas of the Santa Monica Mountains and the Pacific Ocean during the daytime, but extreme caution is advised, especially as the road nears PCH. It is a notoriously dangerous road, and the rusted chassis of cars that have gone over the side can still be seen. Philip Taylor Kramer, bassist with the rock band Iron Butterfly from 1974–1977, allegedly committed suicide by driving his van over the side along this route. Along its steep and winding path through the Santa Monica Mountains as an increasingly tight and twisting canyon road until its intersection with Potrero Road, SR 23 becomes Westlake Boulevard, where it departs Los Angeles County for Ventura County and heads roughly two miles northeast through the Westlake section of Thousand Oaks, a developed residential community. SR 23 then merges with Ventura Freeway (U.S. Route 101) and runs concurrently with it north to the Moorpark Freeway.

The middle section is a major route for traffic headed between Thousand Oaks and Moorpark. It starts in Thousand Oaks, splitting off from the concurrency with US 101 and heading north, with three lanes in both directions. This section terminates at the exit for Los Angeles Avenue when the freeway turns east to become the Ronald Reagan Freeway (State Route 118). Funding for widening of the freeway was approved August 18, 2005, with construction to begin in February 2006, to be completed in 2009. The widening was completed ahead of schedule in April 2008. However, traffic along this freeway during rush hour is extremely congested, particularly near the interchange with US 101.

The northernmost section begins at State Route 118 in Moorpark (called Los Angeles Avenue in Moorpark), and heads north as Grimes Canyon Road through orange groves and sandstone cliffs. In Fillmore, it terminates at State Route 126. The road in Fillmore actually continues past Route 126 up to the foot of the Los Padres National Forest.

On SR 23 from Tierra Rejada Road to Olsen Road (and vice versa) is a bike lane. After crossing Tierra Rejada Road (going north) and Olsen Road (going south), bicyclists are prohibited from crossing.

SR 23 is part of the California Freeway and Expressway System, and the freeway portion is part of the National Highway System, a network of highways that are considered essential to the country's economy, defense, and mobility by the Federal Highway Administration. SR 23 is known as the Military Intelligence Service Memorial Highway from US 101 to California Route 118, in honor of the Military Intelligence Service, the 100th Infantry Battalion, and the 442nd Regimental Combat Team, composed entirely of Japanese Americans.

== History ==
State Route 23 has been designated as such since 1934. However, at this time it was also designated as Legislative Route 155. The freeway portion of SR 23 opened in several phases between 1971 and 1994. Before then, SR 23 ran along Moorpark Road and intersected with U.S. 101 near Newbury Park, although it still ran concurrently with U.S. 101, which was then an expressway.

SR 23 was designated as part of the Freeway and Expressway System in 1959.

=== Decker Freeway ===
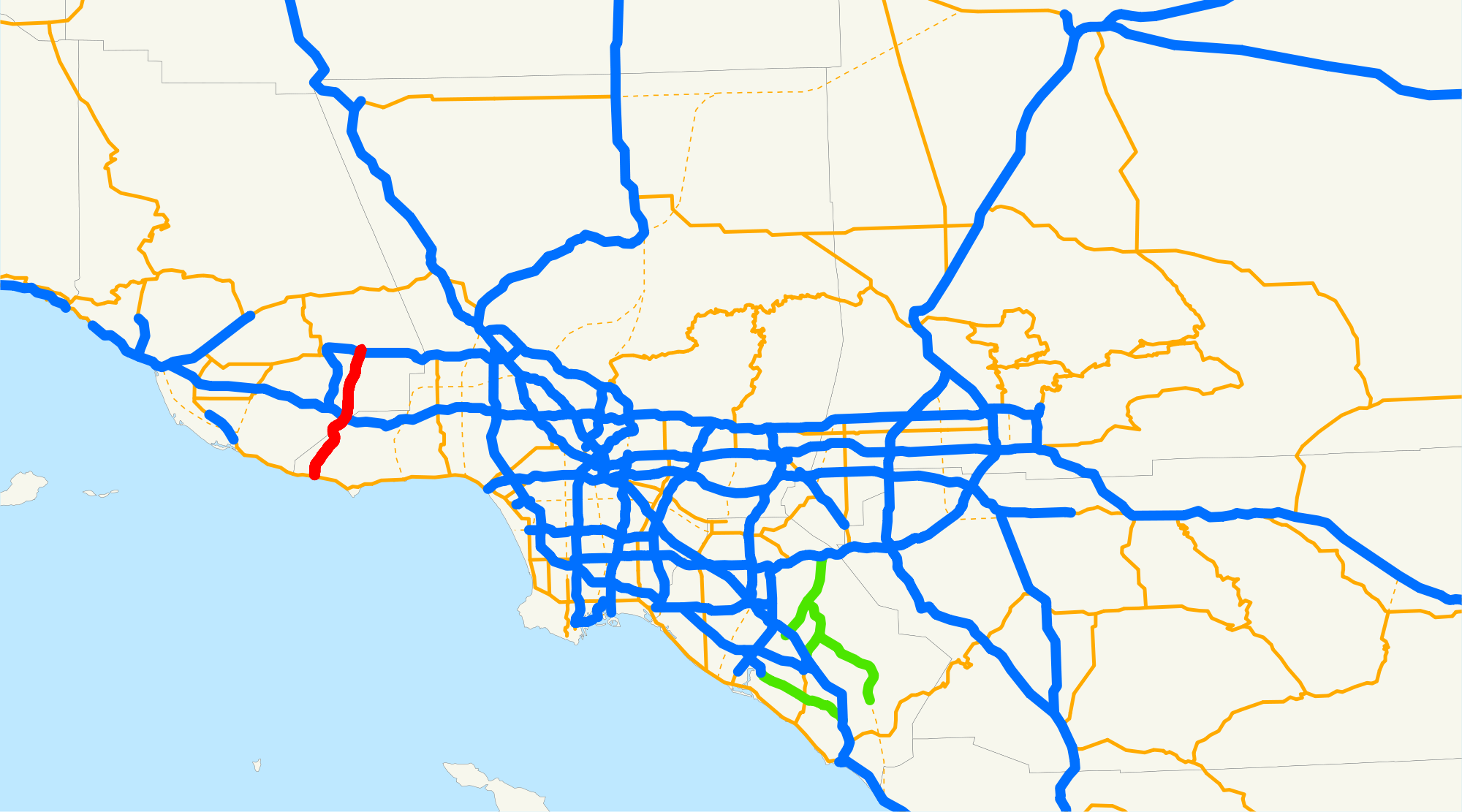
The routing of the proposed Decker Freeway, in red.

The Decker Freeway was an unbuilt north–south freeway that would connect SR 118, US 101, and SR 1. The freeway was part of a 1958 plan by the Metropolitan Engineering Board, but was later considered to be geographically improbable and the plans were abandoned.
The freeway's southern portion, from SR 1 to US 101, follows the general alignment of Decker Canyon Road and Westlake Boulevard, a segment of SR 23. It would continue north before terminating at SR 118 near First Street.

== Major intersections ==
Except where prefixed with a letter, postmiles were measured on the road as it was in 1964, based on the alignment that existed at the time, and do not necessarily reflect current mileage. Postmile prefixes include: R reflecting a realignment in the route since then, M indicating a second realignment, L referring to an overlap due to a correction or change, and T indicating postmiles classified as temporary. Segments that remain unconstructed or have been relinquished to local control may be omitted. The numbers reset at county lines; the start and end postmiles in each county are given in the county column.

County	Location	Postmile	Exit	Destinations	Notes
Los Angeles; LA 0.00-8.90	Malibu	0.00		SR 1 (Pacific Coast Highway) – Oxnard, Santa Monica	South end of SR 23
Ventura; VEN 0.00-24.17	Thousand Oaks	T1.49		Potrero Road – Lake Sherwood, Hidden Valley	
Ventura; VEN 0.00-24.17	Thousand Oaks	R3.32 0.70 (Note: Indicates that the postmile represents the distance along US 101 rather than SR 23.)		US 101 south (Ventura Freeway) / Westlake Boulevard – Los Angeles	Interchange; south end of US 101 overlap; US 101 exit 40
Ventura; VEN 0.00-24.17	Thousand Oaks	R3.32 0.70	South end of freeway on US 101		
Ventura; VEN 0.00-24.17	Thousand Oaks	1.62	41	Hampshire Road	
Ventura; VEN 0.00-24.17	Thousand Oaks	3.11 R3.34	12B	US 101 north (Ventura Freeway) – Ventura	North end of US 101 overlap; SR 23 north follows US 101 north exit 43A, south exit 43B
Ventura; VEN 0.00-24.17	Thousand Oaks	R3.70	13	Hillcrest Drive, Thousand Oaks Boulevard – Thousand Oaks	Southbound exit and northbound entrance
Ventura; VEN 0.00-24.17	Thousand Oaks	R5.06	14	Janss Road	
Ventura; VEN 0.00-24.17	Thousand Oaks	R6.03	15	Avenida de los Arboles	
Ventura; VEN 0.00-24.17	Thousand Oaks	R7.17	16	Sunset Hills Boulevard	
Ventura; VEN 0.00-24.17	Thousand Oaks	R8.21	17	Olsen Road – Simi Valley	
Ventura; VEN 0.00-24.17	Moorpark	R10.16	19	Tierra Rejada Road	
Ventura; VEN 0.00-24.17	Moorpark		North end of freeway		
Ventura; VEN 0.00-24.17	Moorpark	R11.43 T18.21 (Note: Indicates that the postmile represents the distance along SR 118 rather than SR 23.)	20B	SR 118 east (Ronald Reagan Freeway) – Los Angeles	Interchange; south end of SR 118 overlap; SR 23 north/SR 118 west follows SR 23 exit 20A and SR 118 exit 18B; SR 23 south follows SR 118 west exit 18A
Ventura; VEN 0.00-24.17	Moorpark	R17.49 R12.90		SR 118 west (Los Angeles Avenue) / Moorpark Avenue – Saticoy, Ventura	At-grade intersection; north end of SR 118 overlap; SR 23 north follows Moorpark Avenue north, SR 118 west follows Los Angeles Avenue west
Ventura; VEN 0.00-24.17	Fillmore	24.17		SR 126 (Ventura Street) – Santa Clarita, Santa Paula, Ventura	North end of SR 23
Ventura; VEN 0.00-24.17	Fillmore	24.17		A Street	Continuation beyond SR 126
1.000 mi = 1.609 km; 1.000 km = 0.621 mi: Concurrency terminus; Incomplete access
