= California State Route 150 =

Highway in California

State Route 150

- Map of southern California with SR 150 highlighted in red

Route information
- Maintained by Caltrans
- Length: 36.427 mi (58.624 km)

Major junctions
- West end: US 101 / SR 1 in Carpinteria
- SR 33 from Mira Monte to Ojai
- East end: SR 126 in Santa Paula

Location
- Country: United States
- State: California
- Counties: Santa Barbara, Ventura

Highway system
- State highways in California; Interstate; US; State; Scenic; History; Pre‑1964; Unconstructed; Deleted; Freeways
| ← SR 149 | → SR 151 |

State Route 150 (SR 150) is a state highway in the U.S. state of California. It runs from U.S. Route 101 near the Ventura/Santa Barbara County line to State Route 126 in Santa Paula, providing a connection to Lake Casitas and Ojai. It is a two-lane road. There were some one-lane bridges near the western end of the route, but these were rebuilt as two-lane bridges after flooding in 2005.

== Route description ==
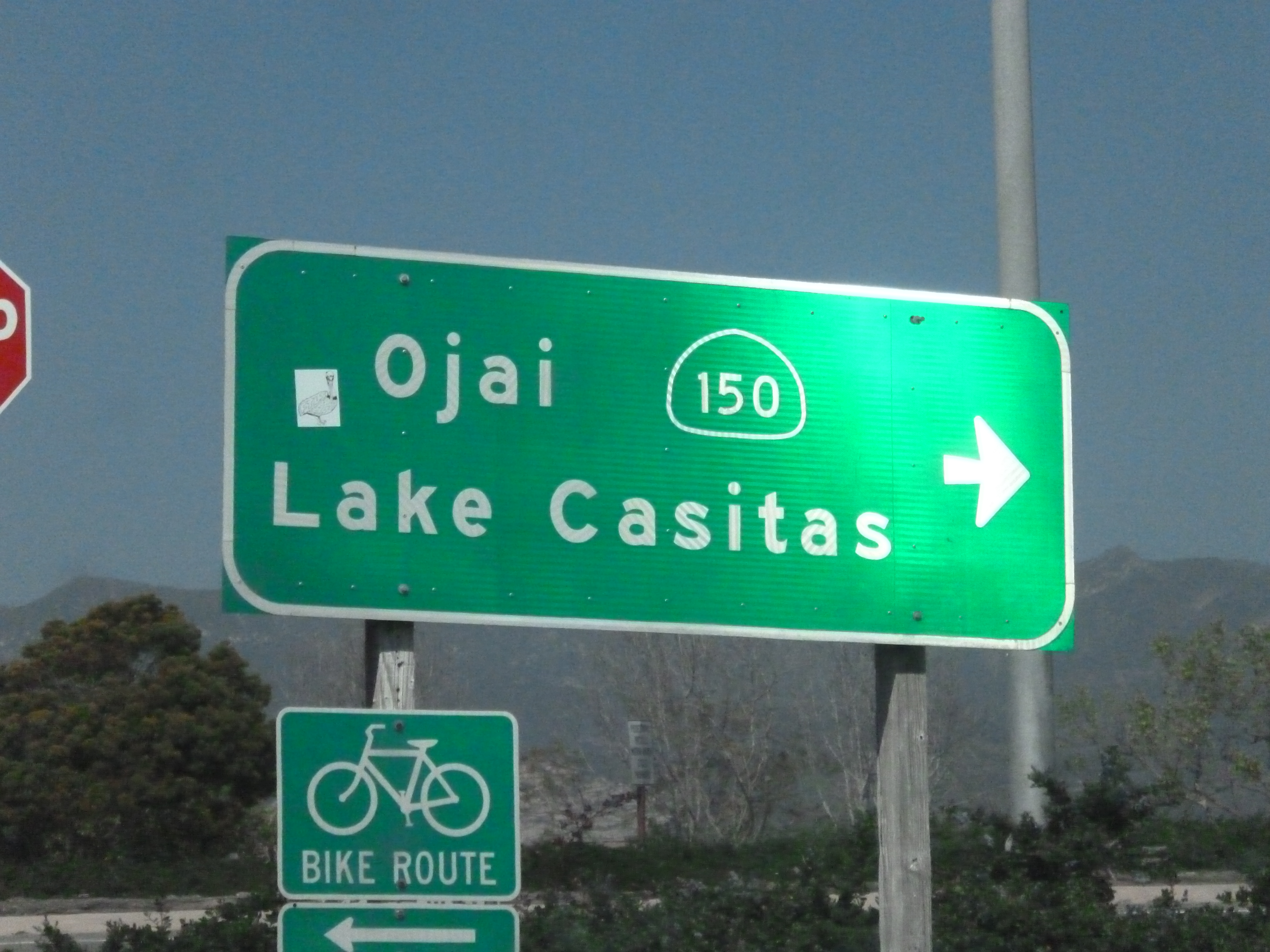
SR 150 sign

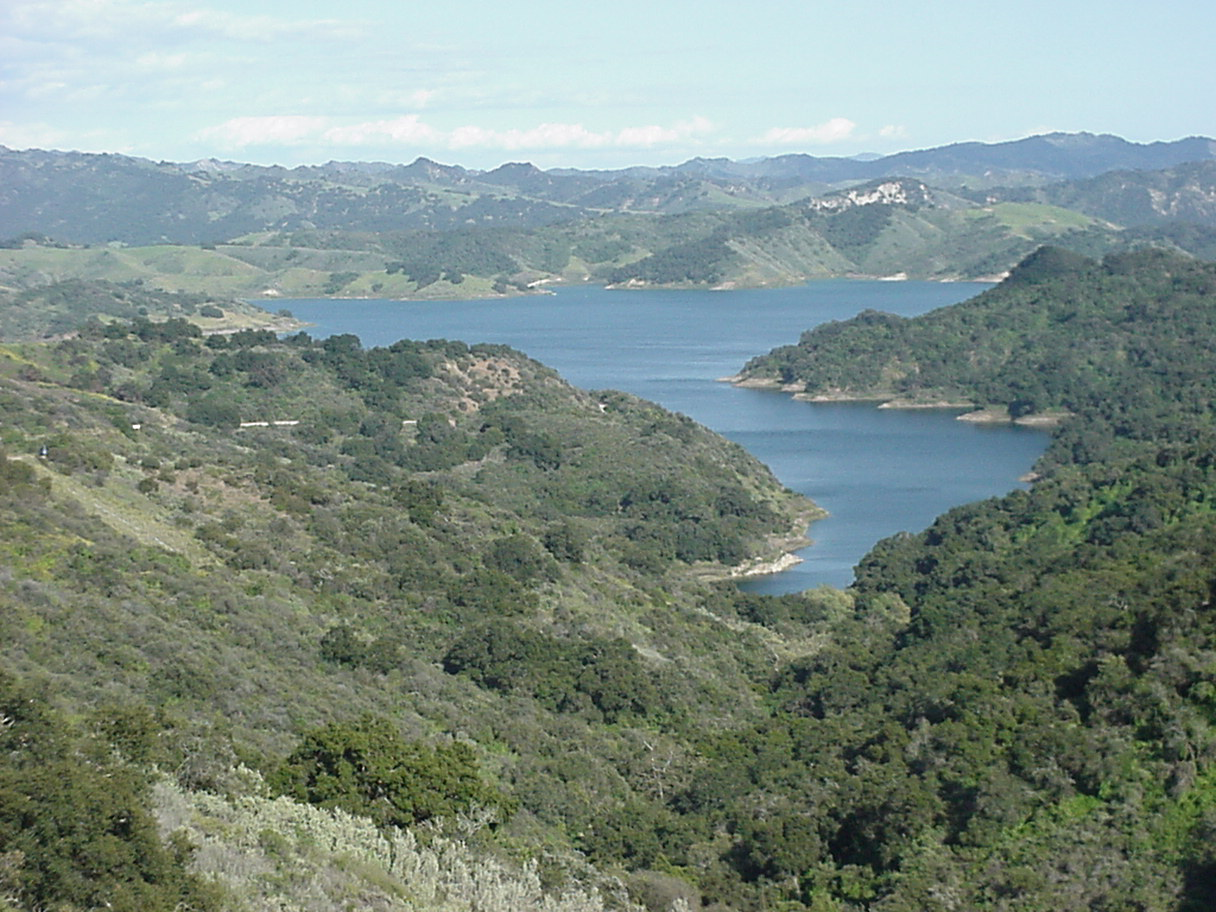
Lake Casitas as seen looking eastward from SR 150

Route 150 is defined in section 450 of the California Streets and Highways Code, and that the highway is "from Route 101 near the Ventura–Santa Barbara county line to Route 126 near Santa Paula".

The western terminus of SR 150 is at US 101 in eastern Carpinteria. It climbs above the Pacific Ocean to reach the mountains west of Lake Casitas. The portion of the road between US 101 and Lake Casitas is called Casitas Pass Road, and the portion between Lake Casitas and Ojai is called Baldwin Road. However, this part of the road is rural and is not used as a primary thoroughfare. SR 33 is recommended to reach Ojai from U.S. 101. SR 150 joins SR 33 (Maricopa Highway) near Meiners Oaks and remains co-signed with the route into the Ojai city limits, where it is known as Ojai Avenue. It runs southeast on Ojai-Santa Paula Road and serves as the major connector between the cities of Ojai and Santa Paula, running past Thomas Aquinas College. In Santa Paula, it becomes 10th Street and ends at an interchange with SR 126.

The other names of Route 150 include Rincon Road (starts at U.S. Route 101 and ends at State Route 192), Casitas Pass Road (starts at Route 192 and ends at Santa Ana Road near Lake Casitas), Baldwin Road (starts at Santa Ana Road and ends at the south junction with Route 33), Ventura Avenue (co-signed with Route 33), Ojai Avenue (starts at the north junction with Route 33 and ends at Reeves Road, approximately one mile east of the east limit of Ojai), Santa Paula/Ojai Road (starts at Reeves Road and ends at the north limit of the City of Santa Paula), Ojai Road (starts at the north limit of Santa Paula and ends at Santa Paula Street in Santa Paula) and 10th Street (starts on Santa Paula Street in Santa Paula and ends at Route 126).

SR 150 south of the outer Ojai city limits is part of the National Highway System, a network of highways that are considered essential to the country's economy, defense, and mobility by the Federal Highway Administration. This route is eligible for the State Scenic Highway System, but it is not officially designated as a scenic highway by the California Department of Transportation.

== History ==
The route was opened in 1897. Before the construction of US 101, it was part of the main highway between Los Angeles and Santa Barbara. Originally, State Route 150 followed the alignment of State Route 192 through the Santa Barbara foothills and climbed up San Marcos Pass via the present-day route of State Route 154 before heading west on State Route 246, passing through Santa Ynez, Solvang, and Buellton and ending in Lompoc at State Route 1 (Cabrillo Highway). The only current remnants of that routing are at the mileage signs for westbound State Route 150, which have the control city as Santa Barbara west of Santa Paula, even though SR 150 currently ends 12 miles (19 km) east of the city.

A portion of the route between Santa Paula and Ojai was closed indefinitely by a landslide in February 2024 following a significant rain storm. Cleanup and the reopening of the section from Stonegate Road in Santa Paula to Steckel Park, north of the city, were delayed due to the risk of triggering additional slides that could damage nearby homes or utility lines.

== Major intersections ==
Except where prefixed with a letter, postmiles were measured on the road as it was in 1964, based on the alignment that existed at the time, and do not necessarily reflect current mileage. Postmile prefixes include: R reflecting a realignment in the route since then, M indicating a second realignment, L referring to an overlap due to a correction or change, and T indicating postmiles classified as temporary. Segments that remain unconstructed or have been relinquished to local control may be omitted. The numbers reset at county lines; the start and end postmiles in each county are given in the county column.

| County | Location | Postmile | Destinations | Notes |
|---|---|---|---|---|
| Santa Barbara; SB R0.00-1.13 | Carpinteria | R0.00 | US 101 (SR 1) | Interchange; west end of SR 150; US 101 exit 84; road continues as Carpinteria Avenue |
| Ventura; VEN 1.13-1.55 | No major junctions | | | |
| Santa Barbara; SB 1.55-2.20 | | 1.67 | SR 192 west (Casitas Pass Road) | Eastern terminus of SR 192 |
| Ventura; VEN 0.00-34.40 | | 11.27 | Santa Ana Road – Lake Casitas | |
| Ventura; VEN 0.00-34.40 | Mira Monte | R14.41 | SR 33 south (Ventura Avenue) – Ventura | West end of SR 33 overlap; former US 399 south |
| Ventura; VEN 0.00-34.40 | Ojai | 16.58 | SR 33 north (Maricopa Highway) – Maricopa | East end of SR 33 overlap; former US 399 north; serves Community Memorial Hospital – Ojai |
| Ventura; VEN 0.00-34.40 | Santa Paula | 33.85 | Santa Paula Street, 10th Street | 10th Street serves Santa Paula Hospital (accessible eastbound via Virginia Terrace) |
| Ventura; VEN 0.00-34.40 | Santa Paula | 34.40 | SR 126 (Santa Paula Freeway) – Fillmore, Ventura | Interchange; east end of SR 150; SR 126 exit 12 |
1.000 mi = 1.609 km; 1.000 km = 0.621 mi: Concurrency terminus
