= Topanga Canyon Boulevard =

Highway in California, US

State Route 27
- Topanga Canyon Boulevard
- SR 27 highlighted in red

Route information
- Maintained by Caltrans
- Length: 19.974 mi (32.145 km)
- Existed: 1963–present
- Tourist routes: Topanga Canyon Boulevard through Topanga Canyon

Major junctions
- South end: SR 1 at Topanga State Beach
- US 101 in Woodland Hills
- North end: SR 118 in Chatsworth

Location
- Country: United States
- State: California
- Counties: Los Angeles

Highway system
- State highways in California; Interstate; US; State; Scenic; History; Pre‑1964; Unconstructed; Deleted; Freeways
← SR 26	→ SR 28

State Route 27, commonly known by its street name Topanga Canyon Boulevard (/təˈpæŋɡə/), is a state highway in the U.S. state of California that runs from the Pacific Coast Highway (California State Route 1) at Topanga State Beach near Pacific Palisades, through the Topanga Canyon in Topanga, and continuing through Woodland Hills, Canoga Park, West Hills, and Chatsworth to the Ronald Reagan Freeway (State Route 118).

As one of the only routes across the Santa Monica Mountains, SR 27 is heavily traveled by commuters from the western San Fernando Valley heading to Santa Monica or Interstate 10.

== Route description ==
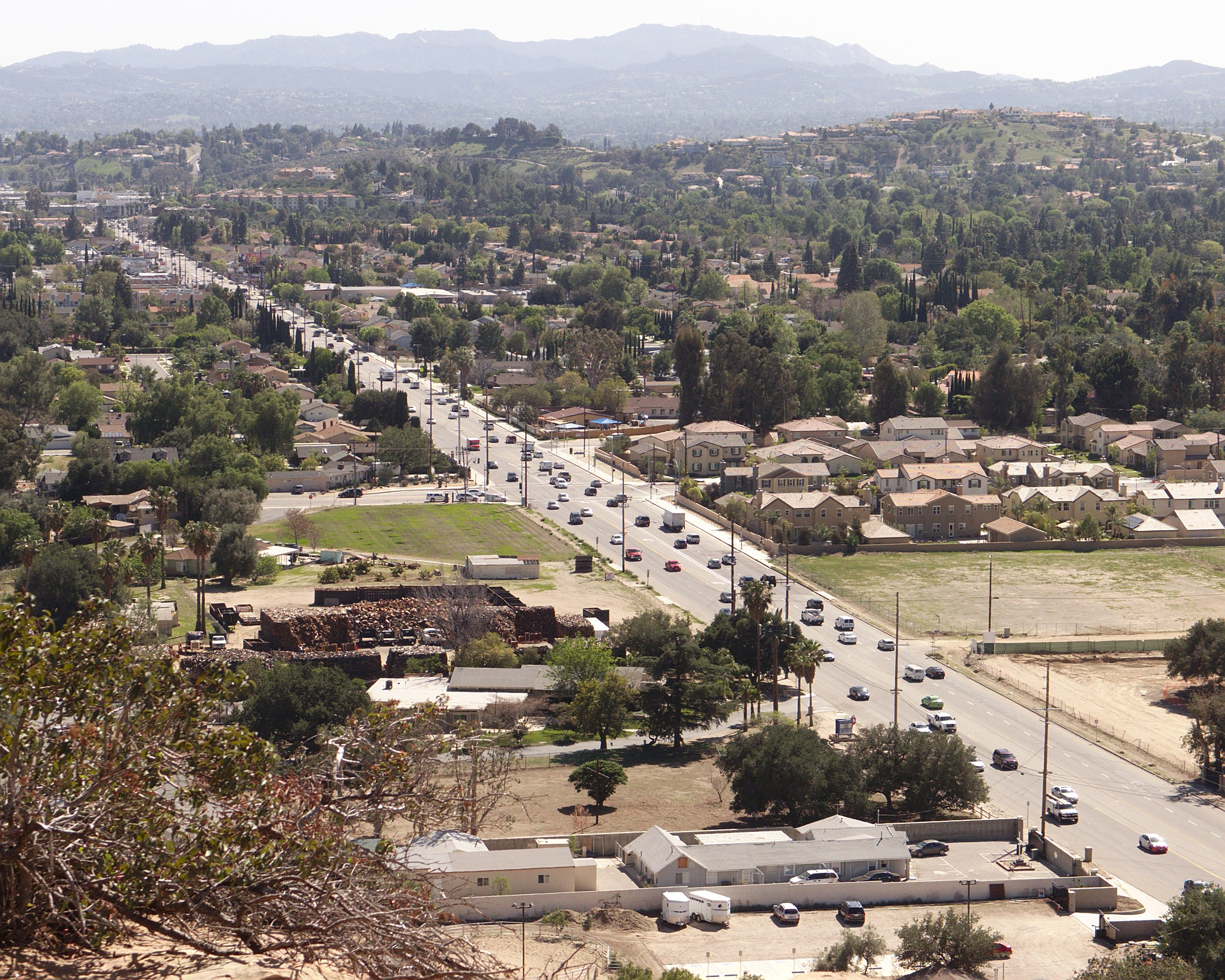
SR 27 looking south from Stoney Point

Route 27 is defined in section 327 of the California Streets and Highways Code, and that the highway is "from Route 1 near Topanga Beach to Route 118".

SR 27 begins at SR 1 near the Pacific Ocean at Topanga State Beach, in an unincorporated area of Los Angeles County east of Malibu. It travels north as Topanga Canyon Boulevard, cutting through Topanga State Park. Upon exiting the park, SR 27 provides access to Fernwood, Topanga, Sylvia Park, and Glenview, all unincorporated. SR 27 continues winding into the San Fernando Valley, nearly entering Calabasas before entering the Los Angeles community of Woodland Hills. The route becomes a major city arterial through the valley, intersecting US 101 before entering Warner Center and Canoga Park. After traversing Chatsworth, SR 27 ends just past an interchange with the SR 118 freeway, thus providing access to the unincorporated area north of Chatsworth.

A segment of Metro Local line 150 runs on Topanga Canyon Boulevard between Ventura Boulevard and Devonshire Street. The Topanga Canyon Beach Bus, operated by the Los Angeles County Department of Public Works, runs on the southern portion of SR 27. It has numerous stops between Warner Center to downtown Santa Monica, including stops in Topanga along SR 27.

Except for a small portion in the mountains, SR 27 is part of the National Highway System, a network of highways that are considered essential to the country's economy, defense, and mobility by the Federal Highway Administration. SR 27 is eligible for the State Scenic Highway System. A portion of it through Topanga Canyon has been officially designated as a scenic highway by the California Department of Transportation.

== History ==
The original state highway system in 1933 included a highway from near Topanga Beach to Montalvo-San Fernando Road near Chatsworth. Two years later, this was numbered as Route 156. The route was redesignated as SR 27 in the 1964 state highway renumbering.

== Major intersections ==
Except where prefixed with a letter, postmiles were measured on the road as it was in 1964, based on the alignment that existed at the time, and do not necessarily reflect current mileage. Postmile prefixes include: R reflecting a realignment in the route since then, M indicating a second realignment, L referring to an overlap due to a correction or change, and T indicating postmiles classified as temporary. Segments that remain unconstructed or have been relinquished to local control may be omitted. The entire route is in Los Angeles County.

Location	Postmile	Destinations	Notes
	0.00	SR 1 (Pacific Coast Highway) – Malibu, Santa Monica	South end of SR 27; former US 101 Alt.
Los Angeles	11.06	Mulholland Drive	Former SR 268
Los Angeles	12.28	Ventura Boulevard	Former US 101 and US 101 Bus.
Los Angeles	12.43	US 101 (Ventura Freeway) – Ventura, Los Angeles	Interchange; US 101 north exits 27A-B, south exit 27
Los Angeles		Victory Boulevard	
Los Angeles	18.63	Devonshire Street – San Fernando	Former SR 118 east
Los Angeles		Santa Susana Pass Road	Former SR 118 west
Los Angeles	20.06	SR 118 (Ronald Reagan Freeway)	Interchange; north end of SR 27; SR 118 exit 34
Los Angeles	20.06	Poema Place	Continuation beyond SR 118
1.000 mi = 1.609 km; 1.000 km = 0.621 mi
