= Buckhorn, Ventura County, California =

Unincorporated community in California, United States

Buckhorn, California
- Unincorporated populated place
- Location within the state of California Buckhorn, California (the United States)
- Coordinates: 34°24′3″N 118°48′56″W
- Country: United States
- State: California
- County: Ventura
- Established: 1869
- Elevation: 604 ft (184 m)
- Time zone: UTC-8 (Pacific (PST))
  - Summer (DST): UTC-7 (PDT)
- ZIP code: 93015
- Area code: 805
- FIPS code: 06-08688
- GNIS feature ID: 1660388

Buckhorn is a populated place name along State Route 126 in a rural unincorporated area of Ventura County, California, United States. Buckhorn is about 2 miles (3.2 km) outside the town of Piru but is within the eponymous census-designated place. Located in the Santa Clara River Valley, this was an early stagecoach stop and a regular eating place known for being midway between Los Angeles and Santa Barbara. It was run by the Warring family who came to the county in 1869 and owned the nearby Buckhorn Ranch. Buckhorn was also a station on the initial route of the coast rail line that arrived in the valley in 1887. With the completion of the Santa Susana Tunnel in 1904, the route through Oxnard and Simi Valley became the most direct route between Los Angeles and San Francisco. The shipping of agricultural products such as citrus continued to keep this route busy for many years. The Santa Paula Branch Line no longer connects through to Santa Clarita after the rails were washed out. The junction with the main line is near the East Ventura station (Metrolink ).

== Politics ==
In the state legislature, Buckhorn is located in the 19th Senate District, represented by Democrat Hannah-Beth Jackson, and in the 37th Assembly district, represented by Democrat Gregg Hart.

In the United States House of Representatives, Buckhorn is in California's 26th congressional district, represented by Democrat Julia Brownley.
