= Saticoy, California =

- Unincorporated community Census designated place
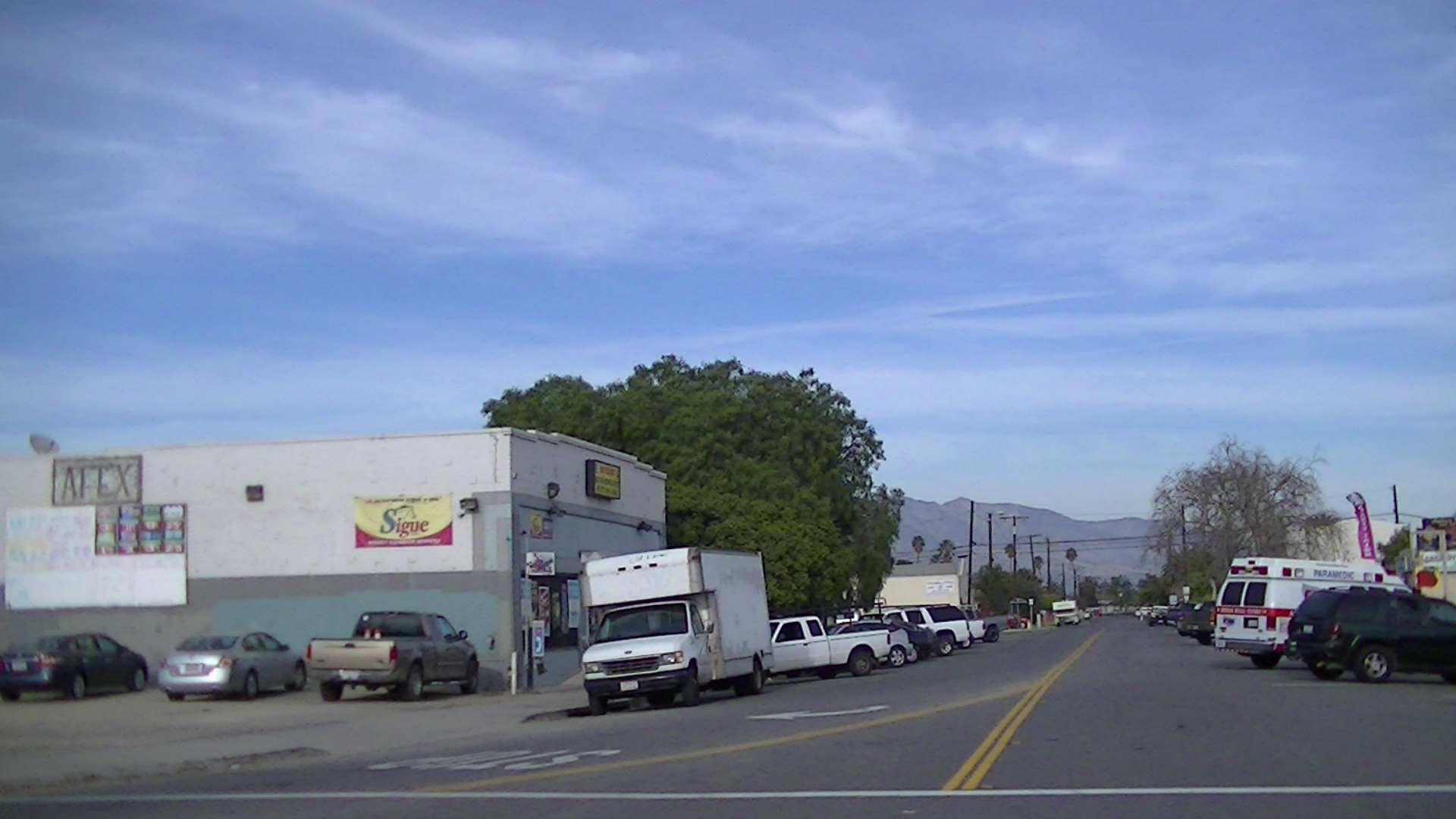

- Location in Ventura County and the state of California

- Location within the state of California Saticoy, California (the United States)
- Coordinates: 34°16′57″N 119°8′56″W
- Country: United States
- State: California
- County: Ventura
- Established: 1861
- Named for: Ventureño name: Sa'aqtik'oy, "it is sheltered from the wind"

Government
  - State senator: Monique Limón (D)
  - Assemblymember: Steve Bennett (D)
  - U. S. rep.: Julia Brownley (D)

Area
  - Total: 0.374 sq mi (0.969 km^{2})
  - Land: 0.374 sq mi (0.968 km^{2})
  - Water: 0.00039 sq mi (0.001 km^{2}) 0.08%
- Elevation: 154 ft (47 m)

Population (2020)
  - Total: 1,133
  - Density: 3,030/sq mi (1,170/km^{2})
- Time zone: UTC-8 (Pacific)
  - Summer (DST): UTC-7 (PDT)
- ZIP code: 93004
- Area code: 805
- FIPS code: 06-84858
- GNIS feature IDs: 249159, 2585446

Saticoy (/ˈsætɪkɔɪ/; Chumash: Sa'aqtik'oy) is an unincorporated community in Ventura County, California, United States. The site of one of the largest settlements of the Chumash region, a settlement was laid out in 1887 along the railroad line that was being built from Los Angeles through the Santa Clara River Valley to the town of San Buenaventura. Although the town was 10 miles (16 km) distant at that time, the City of Ventura grew to a point where only a small residential and commercial community is left outside the city limits. For statistical purposes, the United States Census Bureau has defined that community as a census-designated place (CDP). As of the 2020 census, Saticoy had a population of 1,133.

The commercial district known as Old Town Saticoy is surrounded by a residential neighborhood. Two historic buildings attest to the important role Saticoy once held in the local agricultural economy: Walnut Growers Association Warehouse, and Saticoy (Lima) Bean Warehouse.

Close to the Santa Clara River is a sizable industrial area located on both sides of Los Angeles Avenue. The historic building that formerly housed the Farmers & Merchants Bank of Santa Paula, Saticoy Branch, stands at a quiet intersection that used to be at the center of a vibrant community. The historic setting, stable residential population, railroad, and access to major highways make this agricultural community unique in Ventura County.

== Name ==
The name comes from the Spanish rendering of the Ventureño Chumash village named Sa'aqtik'oy, meaning "it is sheltered from the wind".

== History ==
The earliest known human inhabitants of the vicinity were the Oak Grove People. Some ancient mealing stones of this prehistoric tribe were found near Saticoy in 1932 and traced back to about 3000 B.C. In about the early 15th century, the Chumash tribe inhabited the area. They built canoes and milled the acorns.

Sa'aqtik'oy was one of the largest settlements of the Chumash region, which extended from Point Conception to Santa Monica and back into the foothills as far as the Coast Range. The natural underground springs located in the area made Saticoy a prime location for the tribe to hold their yearly meetings.

In 1769, the Spanish Portola expedition, first recorded European visitors to inland areas of California, came down the valley from the previous night's encampment near today's Santa Paula and camped in the vicinity of Saticoy on August 13. Fray Juan Crespi, a Franciscan missionary traveling with the expedition, noted that the party traveled about 6–7 miles that day and camped near a native village "composed of twenty houses made of grass, in a spherical form, like a half orange, with a vent at the top by which the light enters and the smoke goes out.".

Saticoy lies within the vast 17,773-acre (72 km^{2}) Rancho Santa Paula y Saticoy granted to Manuel Jimeno Casarin on April 28, 1840 by the Mexican government.

In November 1861, Jefferson L. Crane settled at the site of the Chumash village, and other Americans followed soon after. Saticoy, which was then 8 miles (13 km) from Ventura, had a school as early as 1868. W.D.F. Richards, considered the founder of Saticoy, arrived in 1868, and bought 650 acres (2.6 km^{2}) of land. He contributed to the building up of the community and followed many experiments in farming.

The Saticoy Post Office was established in 1873 by the U.S. Post Office Department which was one of seventeen post offices operating in the county in 1890. (Note: Post Offices in Ventura, Hueneme, Santa Paula, Saticoy, and Nordoff provided money order service (Ventura also handled International exchange). Ventura County settlements with a Post Office in 1890 also included Bardsdale, Camulos, Fillmore, Matilija, Montalvo, Newbury Park, New Jerusalem, Piru City, Punta Gorda, Simi, Springville, and Timberville.) R. G. Surdam was listed on the 1880 census for Saticoy with the occupation of real estate agent. He is known as the founder of the towns of Ojai and Bardsdale and for working with Thomas Bard to build the Hueneme wharf.

The streets and lots in the unincorporated present day "Old Town" were laid out in September 1887 on both sides of the newly opened "Southern Pacific Branch Line: Saugus to Santa Barbara."

An area west of Wells Road for which another map entitled "Town of Saticoy" was filed as a competing subdivision to benefit from the new railroad. Through the 1800s and early 1900s, very little development occurred in West Saticoy but the "Old Town" area flourished as a small center of the region’s citrus, bean and other produce production. Rail passenger service stopped in 1934.

The community of West Saticoy did develop a small community just west of the "School Lot" as shown on the map. Saticoy School was built on the lot in 1900. The school is now called ATLAS Elementary: Academy of Technology and Leadership at Saticoy and is part of the Ventura Unified School District. This alternative townsite, on the other side of the Brown Barranca from the railroad station, was located on the main road to San Buenaventura. That distant town, incorporated in 1866, has grown so that all of Saticoy, except for "Old Town," has been annexed into the City of Ventura.

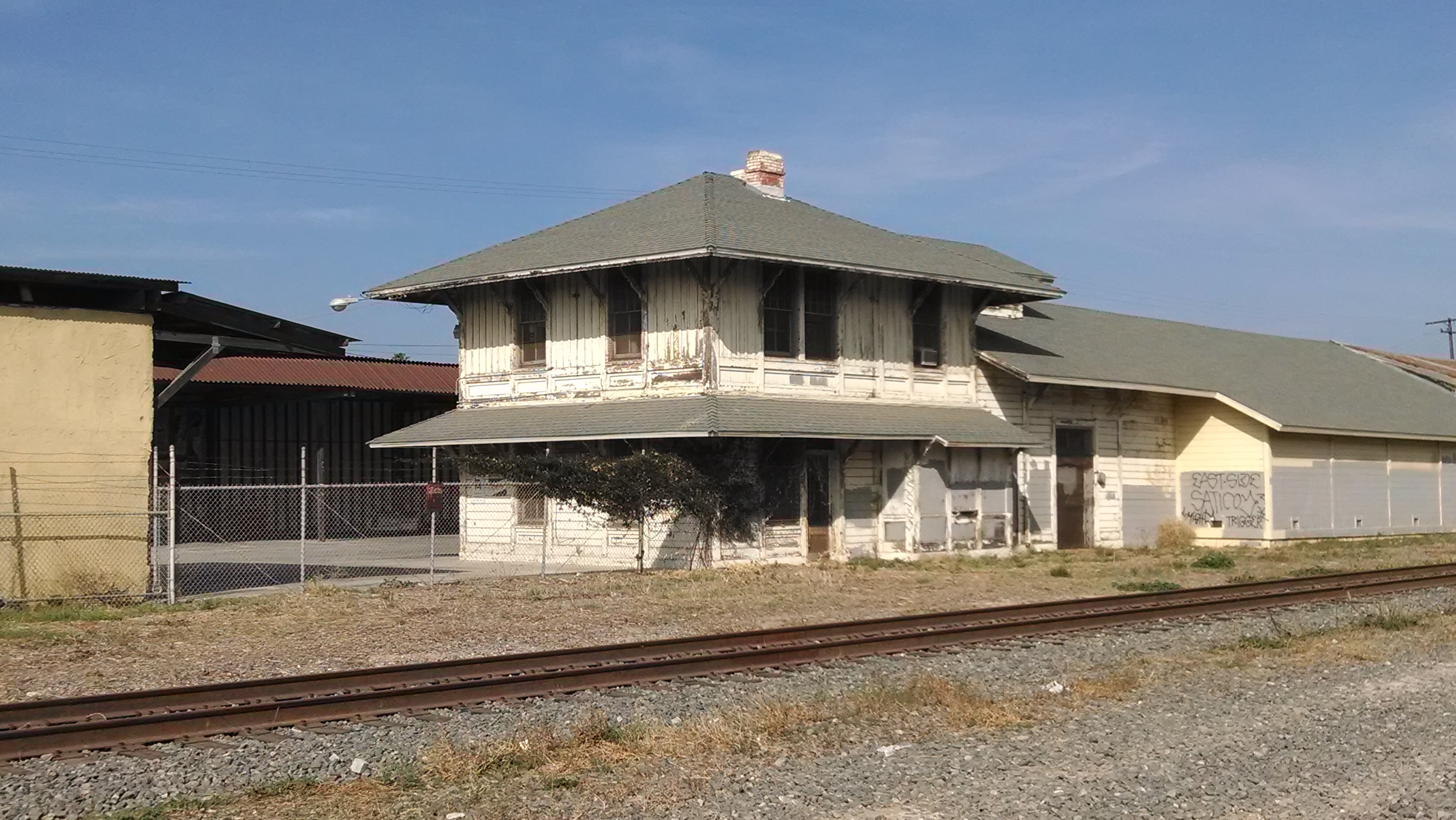
Saticoy Depot

There have been many bridges across the Santa Clara River at Saticoy. They were often washed out due to abundant rainfall and flooding. The most notable washout, however, was due to the flood wave of water caused by the collapse of the St. Francis Dam, in northwest Los Angeles County, which occurred two and a half minutes before midnight on March 12, 1928. The bridge was washed out again in the flood of 1969, and cars were rerouted through the riverbed east of the bridge while it was under repair.

=== Cabrillo Village ===
Cabrillo Village was a 32-acre farm laborer (13 ha) camp built in the 1930s next to the Santa Clara River. A lengthy confrontation in the 1970s ensued when the growers wanted to raze the cramped, rundown homes for development. The confrontation ended in 1976, when 82 farmworker families, advised by affordable housing advocate Rodney Fernandez, pitched in and bought their deteriorating cottages from the Saticoy Lemon Assn. It was perhaps the first time that U.S. farmworkers had purchased the camp they lived in." The first cooperative housing association in Ventura County was formed and the 154 apartments and houses in the village are owned by the cooperative. In 1989 Cabrillo Village was selected as a finalist for the Rudy Bruner Award for Urban Excellence. Eventually new housing tracts were built next to the community and it was annexed into the city of Ventura in 1994. The community is located between the river and the railroad tracks and is about equidistant from "Old Town" and West Saticoy.

== Geography ==
Saticoy is near an apex of this compound alluvial fan formed by the river and Calleguas Creek. The Santa Clara River Valley opens up into the Oxnard Plain here as South Mountain on the south shore marks the end of the valley. Located on the fertile north bank of the Santa Clara River, the shore of the Santa Barbara Channel is some eight miles distant. Agriculture in the area includes avocados, lemons, oranges, strawberries, and many other row crops. Along the shore of the Santa Clara River, amidst the agriculture area east and northeast of the town, is the Saticoy Oil Field, discovered in 1955 and operated by Vintage Petroleum. The city of Ventura is adjacent to the community on the northern and western sides. The Census Bureau definition of the area does not precisely correspond to the local understanding of the historical area of the community.

== Demographics ==
Historical population
Census	Pop.	Note	%±
2010	1,029		—
2020	1,133		10.1%
U.S. Decennial Census; 1850–1870 1880-1890; 1900 1910 1920; 1930 1940 1950; 1960 1970 1980; 1990 2000 2010

Saticoy first appeared as a census designated place in the 2010 U.S. census.

=== 2020 census ===
As of the 2020 census, Saticoy had a population of 1,133. The population density was 3,029.4 inhabitants per square mile (1,169.7/km^{2}). The median age was 32.3 years, with 29.9% of residents under the age of 18 and 9.3% aged 65 or older. For every 100 females, there were 110.2 males, and for every 100 females age 18 and over, there were 111.2 males age 18 and over. 100.0% of residents lived in urban areas, while 0.0% lived in rural areas.

Racial composition as of the 2020 census
Race	Number	Percent
White	271	23.9%
Black or African American	3	0.3%
American Indian and Alaska Native	47	4.1%
Asian	2	0.2%
Native Hawaiian and Other Pacific Islander	3	0.3%
Some other race	310	27.4%
Two or more races	497	43.9%
Hispanic or Latino (of any race)	1,002	88.4%

The census reported that 1,109 people (97.9% of the population) lived in households, 24 (2.1%) lived in non-institutionalized group quarters, and no one was institutionalized.

There were 268 households, of which 142 (53.0%) had children under the age of 18 living in them. Of all households, 143 (53.4%) were married-couple households, 10 (3.7%) were cohabiting couple households, 50 (18.7%) had a male householder with no spouse or partner present, and 65 (24.3%) had a female householder with no spouse or partner present. About 30 households (11.2%) were made up of individuals, and 10 (3.7%) had someone living alone who was 65 years of age or older. The average household size was 4.14. There were 224 families (83.6% of all households).

There were 280 housing units, of which 268 (95.7%) were occupied and 12 (4.3%) were vacant. Of the occupied units, 97 (36.2%) were owner-occupied and 171 (63.8%) were occupied by renters. The homeowner vacancy rate was 0.0%, and the rental vacancy rate was 3.4%.

=== Disadvantaged unincorporated community ===
The Ventura County Local Agency Formation Commission (LAFCo) determined in March 2012 that this unincorporated CDP with an estimated 2010 median household income of $34,145 was a "disadvantaged unincorporated community" (DUC) under the state definition of an annual median household income that is less than 80 percent of the statewide annual median household income. Under state law, LAFCOs are required to make determinations regarding DUCs and an adjacent city's "Sphere of Influence" (SOI) and possible annexation restrictions of territory. (Note: California Senate Bill 244 requires that the complex legal, financial, and political barriers that contribute to regional inequity and infrastructure deficits within disadvantaged unincorporated communities be examined. Including these communities in the long range planning of a city or county, as required by SB 244, will result in a more efficient delivery system of services and infrastructure including but not limited to sewer, water, and structural fire protection. In turn, investment in these services and infrastructure will result in the enhancement and protection of public health and safety for these communities.) SOIs demark the territory that represents the appropriate and probable future jurisdictional boundary and service area of the subject city. Old Town Saticoy is within the city of Ventura's SOI and under state law, annexation would be mandatory before any other development areas are annexed. LAFCo determined that annexation at this time is not appropriate as the City would have to subsidize Saticoy to provide services that are incrementally better than the county now provides.

== Parks and culture ==
The Saticoy library's one-room, 700-square-foot wooden building (65 m^{2}) that had been used since 1973 was torn down in 1991 to make room for a new community center. Four modular units which had been used in Newbury Park were placed on a leased parcel in the residential area of Saticoy by Ventura County Library to create a 2,400-square-foot replacement structure (220 m^{2}). The units had reached the end of their useful life in 2014 so a more centrally located, 4,700-square-foot former hardware store (440 m^{2}) at 1292 Los Angeles Avenue was remodeled into high-tech resource center. Saticoy Regional 9 hole golf course - Originally built as Ventura County Country Club in 1921 by George C. Thomas. “Charmin’ Charley Hudson” owned the course from around 1964 to 1976. The county acquired the land and the golf course was rerouted to make room for the sport fields & park sometime in the late 70’s/ early 80’s. Detail: Par 34, 2700 yards, flat and open, small undulated greens, perfect for all golfers.

== Infrastructure ==
=== Transportation ===
State Route 118 curves through the southerly portion of the townsite although it formerly followed a zig-zag route through the business district. State Route 118 heads northwest as Wells Road to terminate at the Santa Paula Freeway (State Route 126). Los Angeles Avenue is the name given to the highway as it heads east to connect with State Route 232.

=== Utilities ===
Water is provided by the City of Ventura. As the community is outside the corporate boundaries of the city, rates are typically about 20% higher than standard charged inside the city. The amount of multi-family, commercial, and industrial development/redevelopment that can occur within the community is limited as city policy limits new water meters to single family homes on existing lots.

The Saticoy Sanitation District, an independent special district which serves only the community of Saticoy, provides sanitary sewer service.
