= California State Route 162 =

Highway in California

State Route 162 and Forest Highway 7
- SR 162 highlighted in red; FH 7 in blue

Route information
- Maintained by Caltrans and USFS

SR 162 western segment
- West end: US 101 at Longvale
- East end: Mendocino Pass Road east of Covelo

FH 7
- West end: Mendocino Pass Road at the Mendocino National Forest west boundary
- East end: SR 162 near Elk Creek

SR 162 eastern segment
- West end: FH 7 near Elk Creek
- Major intersections: I-5 in Willows; SR 45 from Glenn to Codora; SR 99 from near Biggs to near Richvale; SR 70 in Oroville
- East end: Foreman Creek Road/Oro Quincy Highway at Brush Creek

Location
- Country: United States
- State: California
- Counties: Mendocino, Glenn, Butte

Highway system
- State highways in California; Interstate; US; State; Scenic; History; Pre‑1964; Unconstructed; Deleted; Freeways
- Forest Highway System
← SR 161	→ SR 163

State Route 162 (SR 162) is a state highway in the U.S. state of California that runs roughly west–east through the Coast Ranges and the Sacramento Valley to the western slopes of the Sierra Nevada. It begins at U.S. Route 101 near Longvale, in Mendocino County, and ends at Brush Creek, in Butte County. For most of its length, it is a two lane, undivided highway. SR 162 is not signed as a contiguous route through Mendocino National Forest in Mendocino and Glenn counties. Instead, the portion inside the national forest is federally maintained by the U.S. Forest Service as Forest Highway 7 (FH 7), and is not included in the state route logs.

== Route description ==
Route 162 is defined in section 462 of the California Streets and Highways Code. The definition includes the segment within Mendocino National Forest that is federally maintained as Forest Highway 7. Conversely, the definition omits the concurrencies with various state routes instead of duplicating those segments in the other routes' definitions in the code:

Route 162 is from:
(a) Route 101 near Longvale to Route 5 near Willows via the vicinity of Covelo and Mendocino Pass.
(b) Route 5 near Willows to Route 45.
(c) Route 45 to Route 99 near Biggs.
(d) Route 99 near Richvale to Route 70 near Oroville.
(e) Route 70 near Oroville to Foreman Creek Road via the Bidwell Bar Bridge.

State Route 162 (SR 162) begins in Mendocino County at Longvale, 10 miles (16 km) south of the town of Laytonville along U.S. Route 101. It goes east through Long Valley next to the Middle Fork of the Eel River. On the opposite bank of the river is the right of way of the disused Northwestern Pacific Railroad. It is 28 miles (45 km) from Longvale to Covelo. This portion of SR 162 is called Covelo Road. Covelo is in Round Valley, home of the Round Valley Indian Reservation. SR 162 is called Covelo Road, Commercial Street, and/or Mina Road as it goes north through the center of town. Beyond Covelo, there are 11 miles (18 km) of paved road, called Mendocino Pass Road, between Covelo and the Mendocino National Forest; most of this portion of Mendocino Pass Road is primarily controlled by Mendocino County instead of under state maintenance.

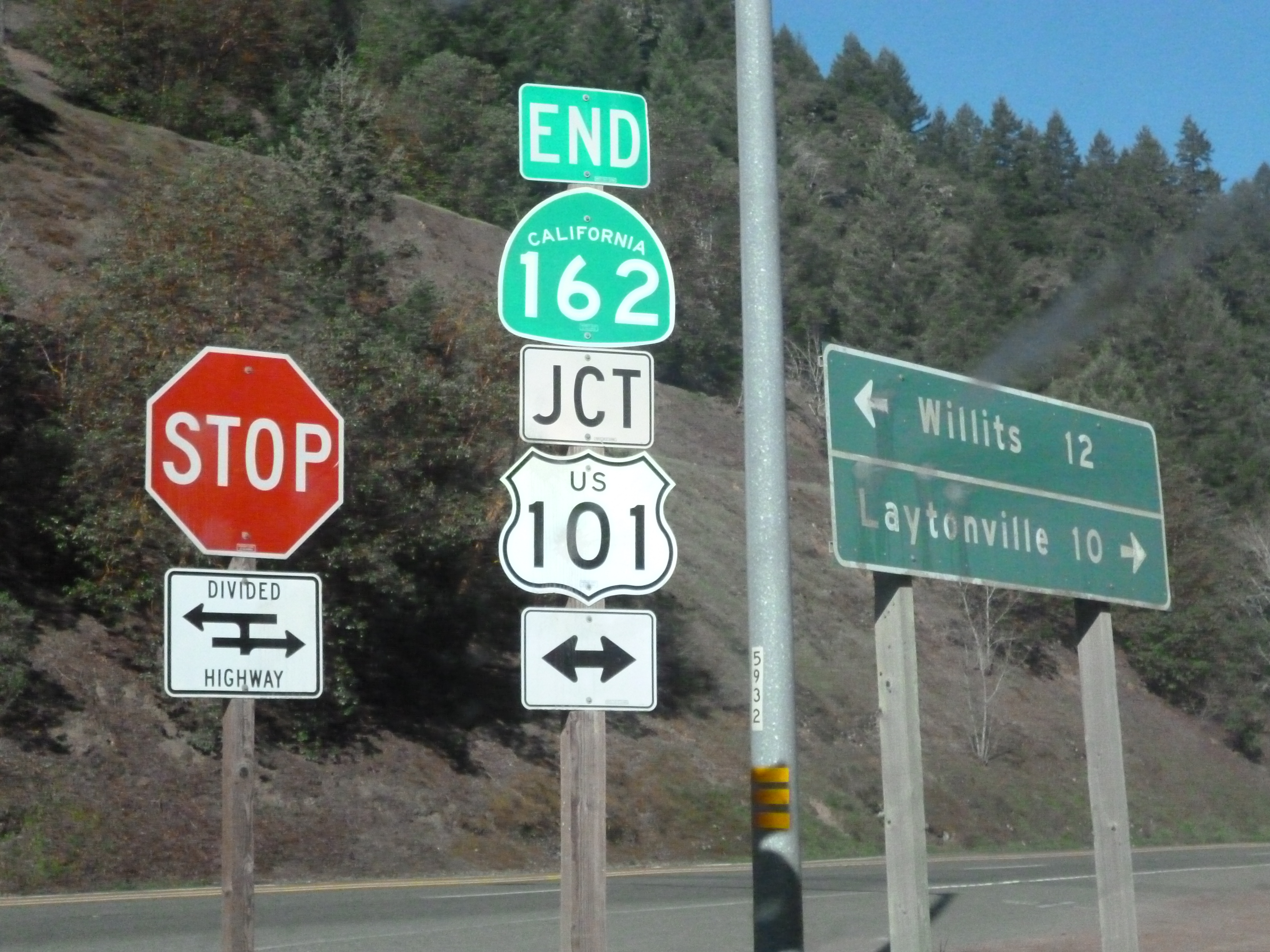
End of California Route 162

When entering the national forest the road becomes Forest Highway 7 (FH 7). FH 7 is maintained by the U.S. Forest Service as it continues across the Mendocino National Forest for 46 miles (74 km) over Mendocino Pass (5,006 ft or 1,526 m), which is closed in winter due to heavy snowfall. The highest point on the road (6,805 ft or 2,074 m) is just north of Black Butte and about 4 miles (6.4 km) NW of Copper City. It is roughly 35 miles (56 km) along the unpaved road to Alder Springs, which is inside the Mendocino National Forest in Glenn County. Alder Springs is the location of the Alder Springs GASB site, which is part of the Consolidated Reporting of Earthquakes and Tsunamis (CREST) network run by the National Oceanic and Atmospheric Administration (NOAA), the United States Geological Survey (USGS), and the Federal Emergency Management Agency (FEMA). State Route 162 resumes near Alder Springs and it is 41 miles (66 km) from there to Willows. Along the way, SR 162 crosses Stoney Creek and runs east paralleling Nye Creek. Seven miles west (11 km) of Willows is Thunderhill Raceway Park. At Willows, SR 162 passes the Willows-Glenn County Airport and crosses Interstate 5.

From Willows and the intersection of Interstate 5, SR 162 runs east for 9 miles (14 km) to the town of Glenn. The track of SR 162 turns right and follows State Route 45 south for 4 miles (6.4 km) along the bank of the Sacramento River to Codora. The highway then turns left going east, crosses the Sacramento River and enters the town of Butte City. The highway jogs north as it passes through Butte City, then east again going 20 miles (32 km) due east to meet State Route 99 (formerly U.S. Route 99). This section is called the Butte City Highway. SR 162 turns north along SR 99 then east again as Oroville Dam Boulevard.

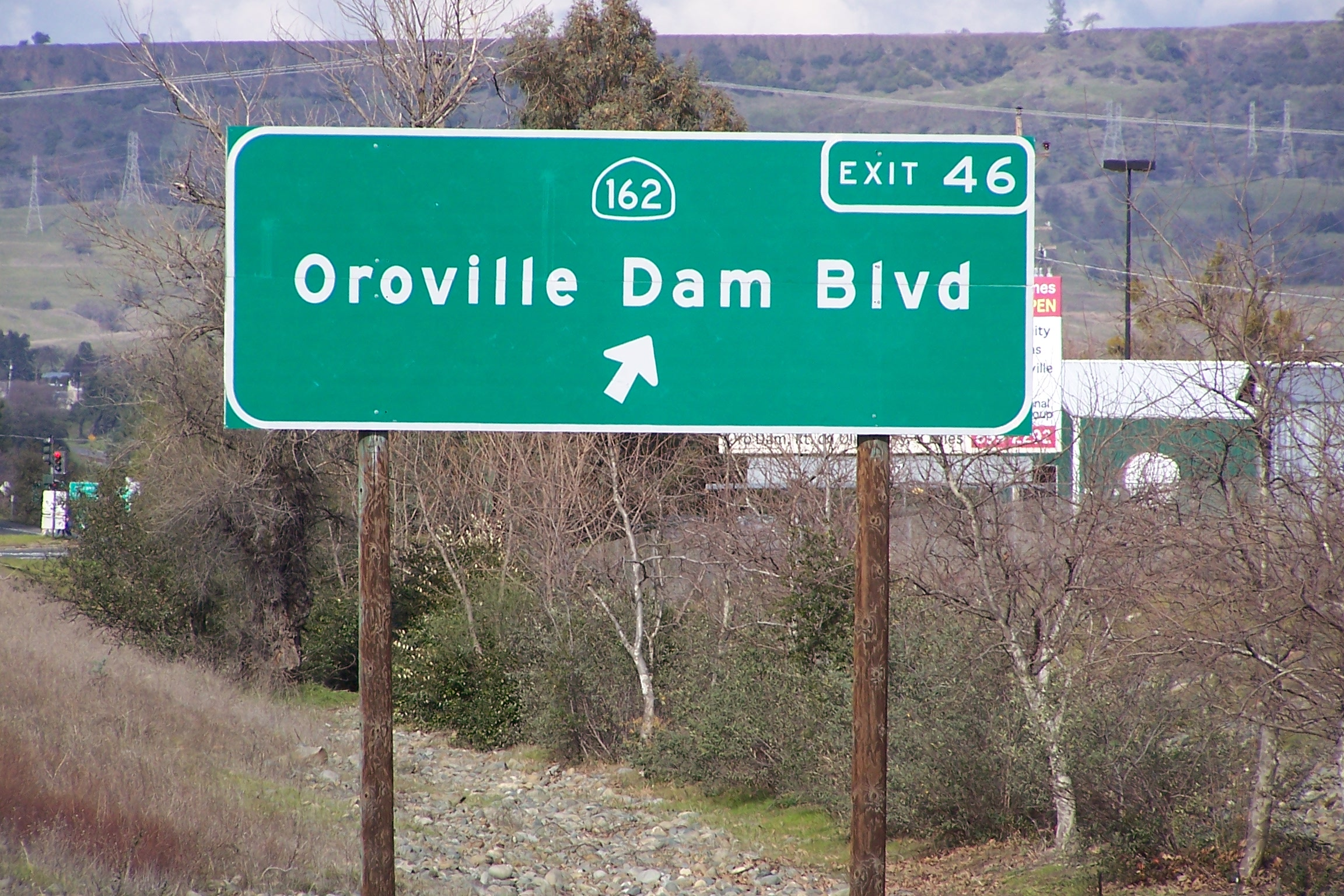
Exit 46 from northbound State Route 70 onto SR 162

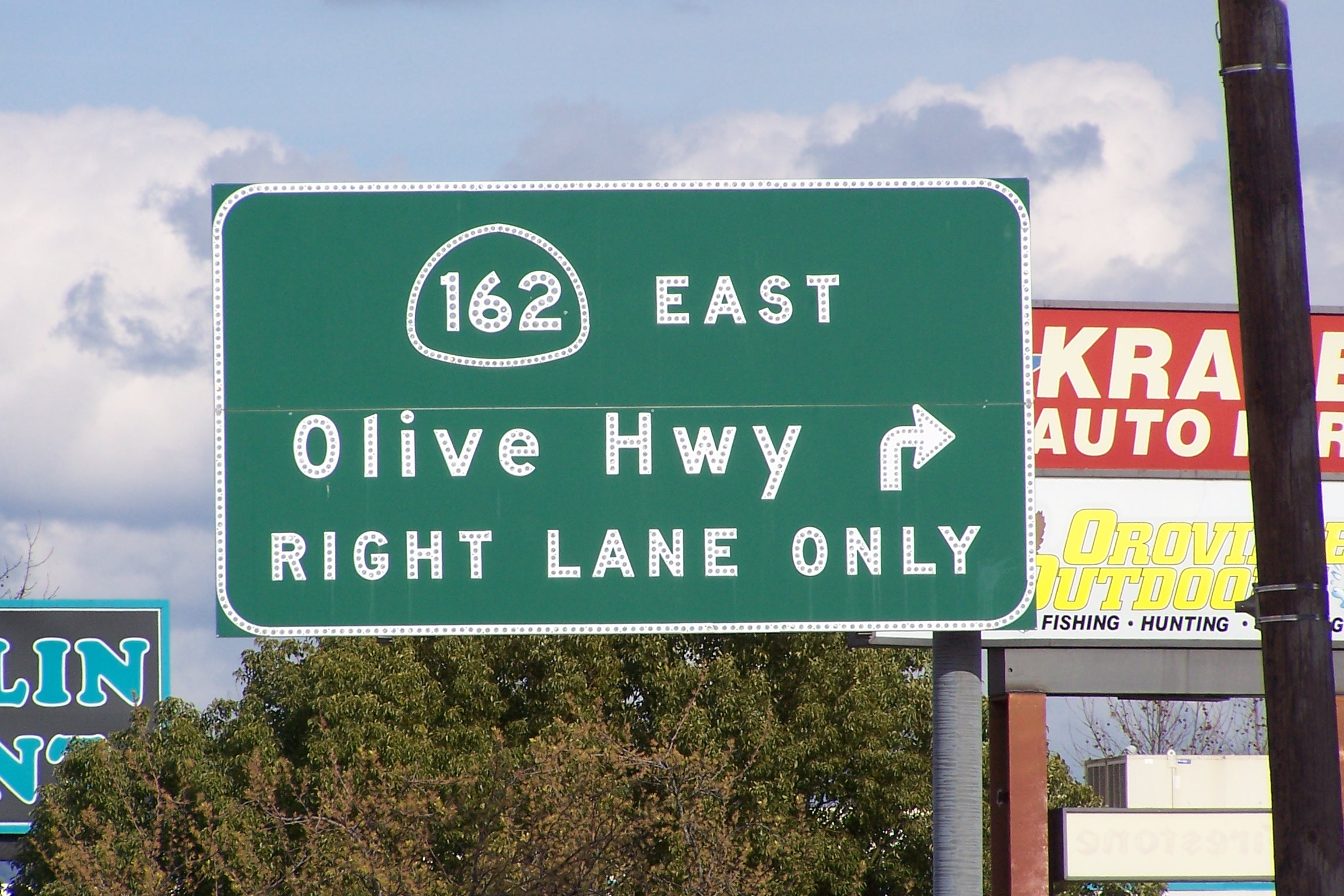
SR 162 turns right, (SE), onto Olive Highway as it leaves Oroville.

Travelling east, SR 162 passes the Thermalito Afterbay and the Oroville Municipal Airport, before crossing the Feather River on the Randy Jennings Memorial Bridge. As the highway enters Oroville, it crosses under State Route 70. This section is named Oroville Dam Blvd or "Oro-Dam". SR 162 goes 2 miles (3.2 km) through the center of Oroville then turns right onto Olive Highway. Olive Highway goes east 7 1/4 miles (11.7 km) to Kelly Ridge Road where it turns north and crosses Lake Oroville over the Bidwell Bar Bridge. SR 162 ends along the Oroville-Quincy Highway at Foreman Creek Road along the eastern edge of the Lake Oroville National Recreation Area.

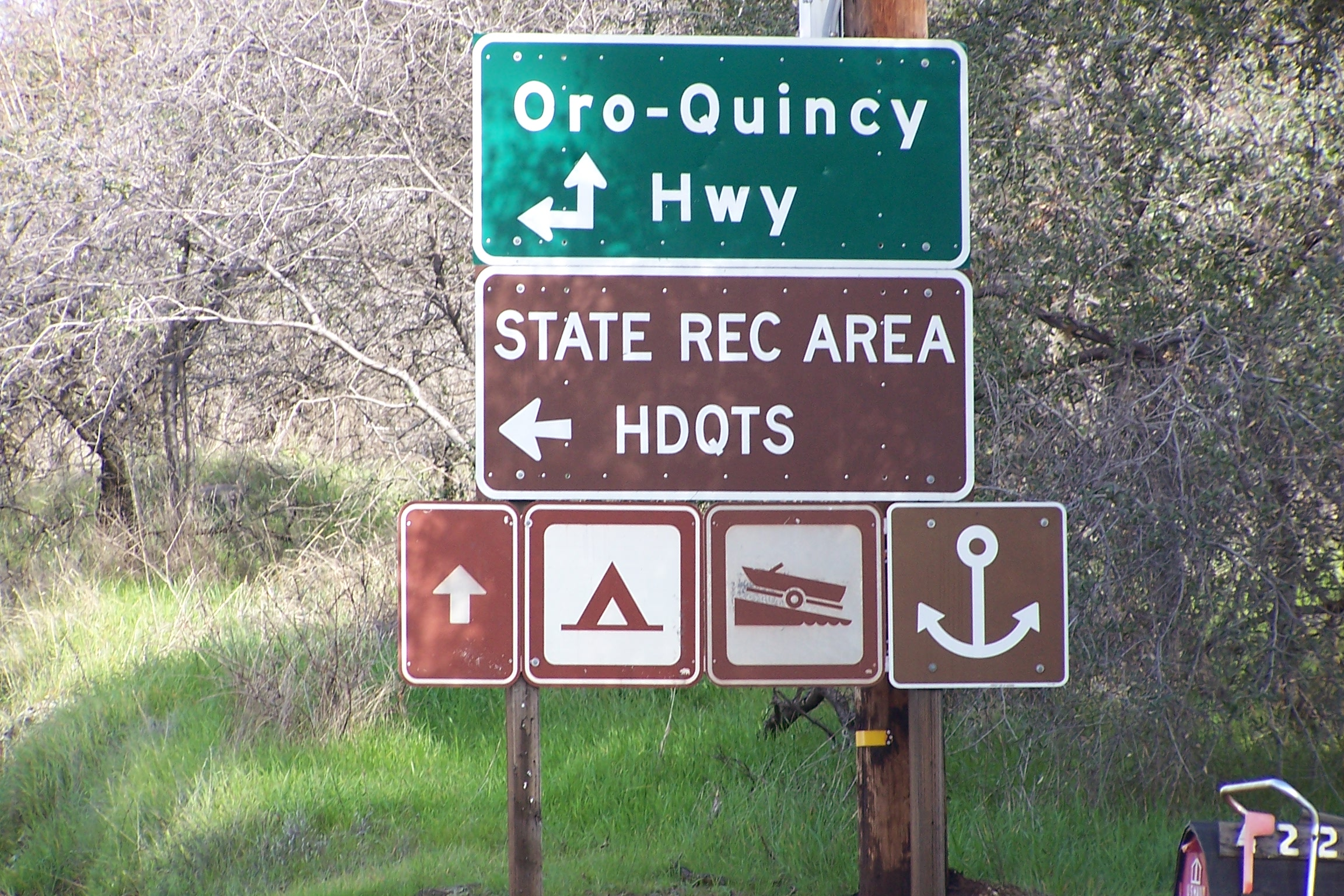
The junction of SR 162 and the Oroville-Quincy Highway near Lake Oroville SRA Headquarters

The Oroville-Quincy Highway begins in Oroville at Oro-Dam Blvd E just past Olive Highway and runs east. It continues east roughly paralleling Olive Highway until it merges with SR 162 just before Oakvale Ave. It breaks off from SR 162 at Wally B Lane running parallel to the highway for a mile or so before reconnecting at Kelly Ridge Road. The highway runs roughly north and crosses Lake Oroville over the Bidwell Bar Bridge. SR 162 ends near here at Foreman Creek Road, but the Oroville-Quincy Highway continues toward Berry Creek and Madrone Lake. Here it turns east again and runs 6.5 miles (10.5 km) to Brush Creek. From Brush Creek, the highway turns north for 12.5 miles (20.1 km) to Palmetto. Here the highway turns ENE 11 miles (18 km) to Buck's Lodge and Bucks Lake. It then goes 16.25 miles (26.15 km) east along Bucks Lake Road past Meadow Valley and Spanish Ranch before arriving at Quincy, a total distance of 62.75 miles (100.99 km).

SR 162 is part of the California Freeway and Expressway System, and east of State Route 70 in Oroville is part of the National Highway System, a network of highways that are considered essential to the country's economy, defense, and mobility by the Federal Highway Administration.

== History ==
State Route 261
- Location: Western segment: Longvale–Dos Rios; Eastern segment: Elk Creek–Willows
- Existed: 1965–1972

In 1915, the Oroville-Quincy Highway was designated as Legislative Route Number 30. This route was abandoned by the state in 1924. In the late 1930s, there was a temporary routing of Alternate US 40 that ran from Davis through Yuba City to Oroville thence to Quincy along Oroville-Quincy Highway, and Bucks Lake Road.

From 1965 to 1972, the segment from US 101 to Interstate 5 was defined as Route 261, but similar to present-day SR 162 it was also not signed as a contiguous route through Mendocino National Forest between Dos Rios and Elk Creek.

== Major intersections ==
Except where prefixed with a letter, postmiles were measured on the road as it was in 1964, based on the alignment that existed at the time, and do not necessarily reflect current mileage. Postmile prefixes include: R reflecting a realignment in the route since then, M indicating a second realignment, L referring to an overlap due to a correction or change, and T indicating postmiles classified as temporary. Segments that remain unconstructed or have been relinquished to local control may be omitted. The numbers reset at county lines; the start and end postmiles in each county are given in the county column.

County	Location	Postmile	Destinations	Notes
Mendocino; MEN R0.00-34.05	Longvale	R0.00	US 101 – Willits, Laytonville	West end of SR 162
Mendocino; MEN R0.00-34.05		34.05	Mendocino Pass Road, Bauer Drewry Road	Eastern end of western segment of SR 162
Mendocino; MEN R0.00-34.05			Mendocino National Forest western boundary	West end of FH 7
Glenn; GLE 37.65-84.59	Mendocino Pass		Mendocino Pass Road, Alder Springs Road	Westbound FH 7 continues as Mendocino Pass Road; eastbound FH 7 continues as Alder Springs Road
Glenn; GLE 37.65-84.59		37.65	Mendocino National Forest eastern boundary	Western end of eastern segment of SR 162; east end of FH 7
Glenn; GLE 37.65-84.59		41.38	Road 306 north – Newville	
Glenn; GLE 37.65-84.59		45.12	Road 306 south – Elk Creek	
Glenn; GLE 37.65-84.59	Willows	65.52	I-5 – Redding, Sacramento	Interchange; I-5 exit 603
Glenn; GLE 37.65-84.59	Willows	66.63	I-5 BL (Tehama Street)	Former US 99W
Glenn; GLE 37.65-84.59	Glenn	76.27 7.53 (Note: Indicates that the postmile represents the distance along SR 45 rather than SR 162.)	SR 45 north – Hamilton City	West end of SR 45 overlap
Glenn; GLE 37.65-84.59	Codora	3.06 76.28	SR 45 south / Road 61 – Princeton, Colusa	East end of SR 45 overlap
Butte; BUT 0.00-31.07		9.73 11.16 (Note: Indicates that the postmile represents the distance along SR 99 rather than SR 162.)	SR 99 south – Yuba City	West end of SR 99 overlap; former US 99E south
Butte; BUT 0.00-31.07		13.16 R9.73	SR 99 north / Richvale Road – Chico, Richvale	East end of SR 99 overlap; former US 99E north
Butte; BUT 0.00-31.07	Oroville	15.83	SR 70 – Quincy, Marysville	Interchange; west end of SR 70 Bus. overlap; SR 70 exit 46
Butte; BUT 0.00-31.07	Oroville	17.30	SR 70 Bus. north (Myers Street)	East end of SR 70 Bus. overlap
Butte; BUT 0.00-31.07		21.26	Canyon Drive (CR B2) – Oroville Dam	Eastern terminus of CR B2
Butte; BUT 0.00-31.07		26.87	Bidwell Bar Bridge over Lake Oroville (middle fork)	
Butte; BUT 0.00-31.07	Brush Creek	31.07	Foreman Creek Road	East end of SR 162
Butte; BUT 0.00-31.07	Brush Creek	31.07	Oroville-Quincy Highway	Continuation beyond Foreman Creek Road
1.000 mi = 1.609 km; 1.000 km = 0.621 mi: Concurrency terminus; Route transition

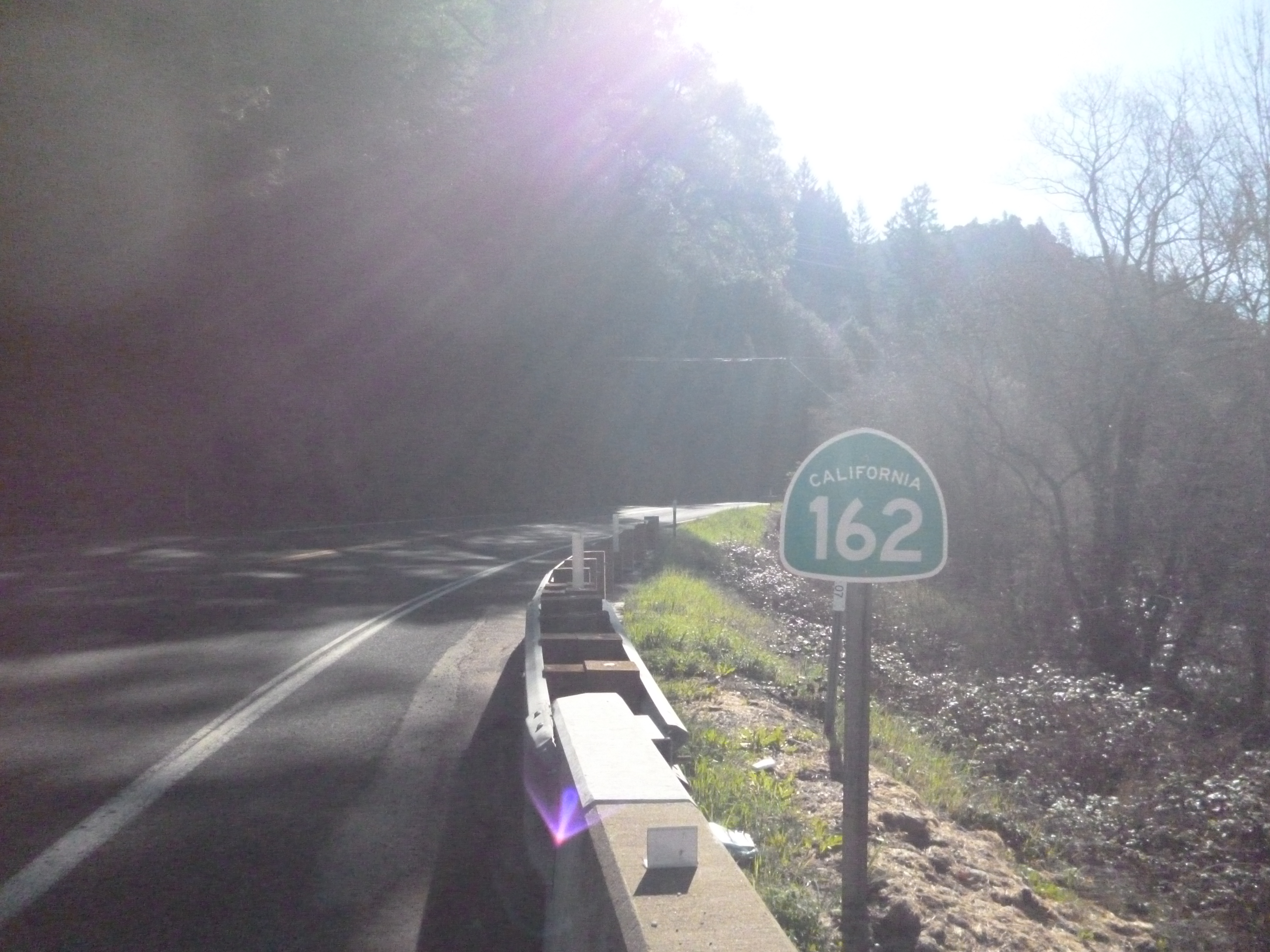
Along California Route 162
