= List of state highways in California =

State Routes in California
- Standard California state route shields, variously identified by the state as the shape of a miner's spade, to honor the California Gold Rush, and an acorn shape.

Highway names
- Interstates: Interstate XX (I-XX)
- US Highways: U.S. Route XX (US XX)
- State: State Route XX (SR XX)

System links
- State highways in California; Interstate; US; State; Scenic; History; Pre‑1964; Unconstructed; Deleted; Freeways

This is a list of state highways in the U.S. state of California that have existed since the 1964 renumbering. It includes routes that were defined by the California State Legislature but never built, as well as routes that have been entirely relinquished to local governments. It does not include the few routes that were relinquished before 1964 or the larger number of sign routes that were renumbered in or before 1964.

Each state highway in California is maintained by the California Department of Transportation (Caltrans) and is assigned a Route (officially State Highway Route) number in the Streets and Highways Code (Sections 300-635). Under the code, the state assigns a unique Route X to each highway, and does not differentiate between state, US, or Interstate highways.

== Mainline routes ==
- U.S. Routes and Interstate Highways that traverse California are also defined in the California Streets and Highways code as state routes. This list does not include these state routes as they are listed separately.
- A few cases exist, such as SR 110, where a defined California State Route partially overlaps with a federally defined Interstate Highway, while the remaining portion is signed as a state highway. This table only addresses the portion signed as a California State Route in these cases.
- Lengths for each state route were initially measured as they existed during the 1964 state highway renumbering (or during the year the route was established, if after 1964), and do not necessarily reflect the current mileage.
- The years listed reflect when the route was affected by legislative action, this is not necessarily the same year as the actual construction or signing changes to the route. Most notably, SR 275 was deleted from the Streets and Highways Code in 1996, but remained partially maintained until it was added back in 2010; and SR 42 was signed as such for over 30 years after it was redesignated as 105.
- Concurrencies are not explicitly codified in the Streets and Highways Code; such highway segments are listed on only one of the corresponding legislative route numbers. For example, the I-80/I-580 concurrency, known as the Eastshore Freeway, is only listed under Route 80 in the highway code while the definition of Route 580 is broken into non-contiguous segments. When a highway is broken into such segments, the total length recorded by Caltrans only reflects those non-contiguous segments and does not include those overlaps that would be required to make the route continuous. Furthermore, Caltrans may not sign all concurrencies, and instead may only post the highway shields for the route with the contiguous segment in the code.
- Some highways are not contiguous as the state has relinquished control of small sections to local governments. The stated length of the highway may or may not reflect the portions under local control.
- For simplicity, the termini columns below only list each route's overall end points, and do not include relinquished or unconstructed gaps.

Number	Length (mi) (Note: Lengths rounded to the nearest mile or tenth-mile are estimated from various sources including Google Maps.)	Length (km)	Southern or western terminus	Northern or eastern terminus	Formed	Removed	Notes
SR 1	655.85 (Note: This route consists of non-contiguous segments, and the length does not reflect the overlaps that would be required to make the route contiguous.) (Note: Portions of this route have been relinquished to or are otherwise maintained by local or other governments, and may not be included in the length.)	1,055.49	I-5 in Dana Point	US 101 near Leggett	1934	current	
SR 2	86.24	138.79	Centinela Avenue in Santa Monica	SR 138 near Wrightwood	1934	current	
SR 3	146.37	235.56	SR 36 near Peanut	Ball Mountain Little Shasta Road in Montague	1964	current	
SR 4	197	317	I-80 / San Pablo Avenue in Hercules	SR 89 near Markleeville	1934	current	
SR 7	6.718	10.812	Mexican border east of Calexico	I-8 / CR S32 south of Holtville	1990	current	
SR 7	—	—	SR 1 in Long Beach	I-210 / SR 134 in Pasadena	1964	1984	Now part of I-710
SR 9	38.497	61.955	SR 1 in Santa Cruz	SR 17 in Los Gatos	1934	current	Parts of SR 85, I-680, SR 237, and the entireties of SR 262, and SR 238 were formally SR 9 until the highway was truncated in 1963-1964.
SR 10	—	—	SR 1 in Inglewood	SR 91 in Anaheim	1934	1960	Later SR 42
SR 11	2.7	4.3	SR 125 / SR 905 in Otay Mesa	Mexican border at Otay Mesa East Port of Entry	1994	current	The first segment from SR 905 east to Enrico Fermi Drive opened on March 19, 2016. The remaining segments are still under construction.
SR 11	33.06	53.20	9th Street in San Pedro	Colorado Boulevard in Pasadena	1964	1981	The segment of SR 11 south of 0.03 mile north O'Farrell Street in San Pedro as well as the segment north of Glenarm Street in Pasadena that were re-designated as part of SR 110 after July, 1964 have been relinquished; the segment from 0.03 mile north of O'Farrell Street to I-10 in Los Angeles is presently part of I-110; the segment from I-10 to Glenarm Street is presently part of SR 110.
SR 12	140.64 (Note: Mileage and/or termini do not reflect segments that remain unconstructed)	226.34	SR 116 in Sebastopol	SR 49 near San Andreas	1934	current	
SR 13	9.73	15.66	I-580 in Oakland	I-80 / I-580 in Berkeley	1964	current	
SR 14	116.645	187.722	I-5 near Santa Clarita	US 395 near Inyokern	1964	current	Formerly part of US 6
SR 15	5.59 (Note: Part of one of the contiguous routes that is partially signed as an Interstate Highway, while the remaining segment is signed as a state highway.)	9.00	I-5 in San Diego	I-8 in San Diego	1957	current	Future southern extension of I-15
SR 16	111.17	178.91	SR 20 near Rumsey	SR 49 near Drytown	1934	current	
SR 17	26.49	42.63	SR 1 in Santa Cruz	I-280 / I-880 in San Jose	1934	current	Parts of I-580 and the entirety of I-880 were formerly SR 17 until the highway was truncated in 1984.
SR 18	117.21	188.63	SR 210 in San Bernardino	SR 138 near Pearblossom	1934	current	
SR 19	4.4	7.1	Rose Street at the Lakewood–Bellflower line	Gardendale Street at the Bellflower–Downey line	1934	current	Currently being relinquished to the City of Bellflower; Also, SR 164 (north of Gallatin Road) is signed as SR 19 along Rosemead Boulevard
SR 20	211.882	340.991	SR 1 in Fort Bragg	I-80 near Emigrant Gap	1934	current	
SR 21	70.52	113.49	US 101/I-280 in San Jose	I-80 in Cordelia	1934	1976	Now I-680 (old I-680 became I-780)
SR 22	14.725	23.698	SR 1 in Long Beach	SR 55 in Orange	1934	current	
SR 23	32.03	51.55	SR 1 in Malibu	SR 126 in Fillmore	1934	current	
SR 24	13.492	21.713	I-580 / I-980 in Oakland	I-680 in Walnut Creek	1934	current	
SR 25	74.632	120.109	SR 198 east of San Lucas	US 101 near Gilroy	1934	current	
SR 26	62.162	100.040	SR 99 near Stockton	SR 88 near Pioneer	1934	current	
SR 27	19.974	32.145	SR 1 near Malibu	SR 118 in Chatsworth	1934	current	
SR 28	10.943	17.611	SR 89 in Tahoe City	SR 28 in Kings Beach	1934	current	
SR 29	105.648	170.024	I-80 in Vallejo	SR 20 in Upper Lake	1934	current	
SR 30	44	71	I-210 / SR 57 in Glendora	I-10 in Redlands	1952	2007	Now SR 210
SR 31	13.17	21.20	I-15 / SR 91 in Corona	I-10 in Ontario	1964	1974	Now I-15
SR 32	74.387	119.714	I-5 in Orland	SR 36 / SR 89 near Chester	1934	current	
SR 33	289.699	466.225	US 101 in Ventura	I-5 near Tracy	1934	current	
SR 34	13.368	21.514	Rice Avenue in Oxnard	SR 118 in Somis	1934	current	
SR 35	54.056	86.995	SR 17 near Redwood Estates	SR 1 in San Francisco	1964	current	
SR 36	248.856	400.495	US 101 near Fortuna	US 395 near Susanville	1934	current	
SR 37	21.494	34.591	US 101 in Novato	I-80 in Vallejo	1934	current	
SR 38	59	95	I-10 in Redlands	SR 18 near Big Bear Lake	1934	current	
SR 39	50.017	80.495	SR 1 in Huntington Beach	SR 2 in the Angeles National Forest	1934	current	Northernmost section from Crystal Lake Road to SR 2 has been closed indefinitely since 1978 due to a massive rockslide
SR 41	185.594	298.685	SR 1 in Morro Bay	SR 140 in Yosemite National Park	1934	current	
SR 42	—	—	SR 1 in Inglewood	SR 91 in Anaheim	1960	2000	Replaced by I-105; Ran along Manchester Boulevard, Manchester Avenue, Firestone Boulevard, and Imperial Highway in Los Angeles and Orange Counties.
SR 43	98	158	SR 119 near Taft	SR 99 in Selma	1934	current	
SR 44	107.02	172.23	SR 273 / SR 299 in Redding	SR 36 near Susanville	1935	current	
SR 45	70	110	SR 113 in Knights Landing	SR 32 in Hamilton City	1934	current	
SR 46	110.696	178.148	SR 1 near Cambria	SR 99 in Famoso	1964	current	
SR 47	3.078	4.954	I-110 in San Pedro	SR 91 in Compton	1949	current	
SR 48	8.5	13.7	SR 14 / SR 138 at Lancaster	SR 122 at Lancaster	1964	current	Unconstructed
SR 49	295.065	474.861	SR 41 at Oakhurst	SR 70 at Vinton	1934	current	
SR 51	10.7	17.2	US 50 / SR 99 in Sacramento	I-80 / SR 244 in North Highlands	1979	current	Signed as BL 80. Former routing of I-80.
SR 51	8.86	14.26	I-5 in Santa Ana	I-5 in Anaheim	1964	1965	Ran north along Main Street and west along Orangewood Avenue.
SR 52	17.222	27.716	I-5 in San Diego	SR 67 in Santee	1964	current	
SR 53	7.45	11.99	SR 29 in Lower Lake	SR 20 near Clearlake	1934	current	
SR 54	14.212	22.872	I-5 in National City	Chase Avenue El Cajon city limits	1961	current	
SR 55	17.807	28.658	Finley Avenue in Newport Beach	SR 91 in Anaheim	1964	current	
SR 56	9.21	14.82	I-5 in Carmel Valley, San Diego	I-15 in Rancho Peñasquitos, San Diego	1964	current	
SR 57	25.84	41.59	I-5 / SR 22 in Santa Ana	I-210 / SR 210 in Glendora	1964	current	
SR 58	241	388	US 101 near Santa Margarita	I-15 near Barstow	1964	current	
SR 59	33.76	54.33	SR 152 near El Nido	CR J16 / CR J59 in Snelling	1934	current	
SR 60	70	110	I-5 / I-10 / US 101 in Los Angeles	I-10 in Beaumont	1964	current	
SR 61	6.97	11.22	SR 185 in San Leandro	I-880 in Oakland	1964	current	Also signed along SR 112 and SR 260
SR 62	151.438	243.716	I-10 in Whitewater	SR 95 Truck in Earp	1934	current	
SR 63	38.043	61.224	SR 137 in Tulare	SR 180 near Squaw Valley	1934	current	
SR 64	30	48	SR 1 near Malibu Beach	I-5 south of San Fernando	1964	current	Unconstructed
SR 65	94.217 (Note: This route is broken into pieces due to a gap in the description, unfilled by any route.)	151.628	SR 99 near Bakersfield	SR 70 in Olivehurst	1934	current	
SR 66	32.321	52.016	SR 210 in La Verne	I-215 in San Bernardino	1964	current	
SR 67	24.38	39.24	I-8 in El Cajon	SR 78 in Ramona	1934	current	
SR 68	22.02	35.44	Asilomar State Beach in Pacific Grove	US 101 in Salinas	1934	current	
SR 69	42	68	SR 198	SR 180 near Kings Canyon National Park	1964	1972	Now SR 245
SR 70	178.528	287.313	SR 99 near Sacramento	US 395 in Hallelujah Junction	1964	current	
SR 71	16	26	SR 91 in Corona	I-10 / SR 57 in San Dimas	1934	current	
SR 72	7.204	11.594	SR 39 in La Habra	I-605 in Whittier	1964	current	Formerly part of US 101
SR 73	17.764	28.588	I-5 in Mission Viejo	I-405 in Costa Mesa	1964	current	
SR 74	111.48	179.41	I-5 in San Juan Capistrano	Southern city limit of Palm Desert	1934	current	
SR 75	13.306	21.414	I-5 near San Ysidro	I-5 in San Diego	1924	current	
SR 76	52.63	84.70	I-5 in Oceanside	SR 79 near Lake Henshaw	1964	current	
SR 77	0.353	0.568	I-880 in Oakland	SR 185 in Oakland	1964	current	An unconstructed extension northeast to SR 24 near Lafayette is legislated
SR 78	215.39	346.64	I-5 in Oceanside	I-10 near Blythe	1934	current	
SR 79	106.731	171.767	I-8 near Descanso	I-10 in Beaumont	1934	current	
SR 81	31	50	I-215 near Riverside	I-15 near Devore	1964	current	Unconstructed
SR 82	42.266	68.021	I-880 in San Jose	I-280 in San Francisco	1964	current	Former routing of US 101
SR 83	13.998	22.528	SR 71 in Chino Hills	I-10 in Upland	1964	current	
SR 84	96	154	SR 1 at San Gregorio	West Sacramento city limit	1934	current	
SR 85	24.2	38.9	US 101 in San Jose	US 101 in Mountain View	1964	current	Formerly part of SR 9 from 1934 to 1964
SR 86	90.67	145.92	SR 111 near Calexico	I-10 in Indio	1964	current	
SR 87	9	14	SR 85 in San Jose	US 101 in San Jose	1964	current	
SR 88	122	196	SR 99 in Stockton	SR 88 near Paynesville	1934	current	
SR 89	243	391	US 395 near Coleville	I-5 near Mount Shasta	1934	current	
SR 90	15.5	24.9	SR 1 near Venice	SR 91 in Anaheim	1964	current	
SR 91	59.047	95.027	I-110 / Vermont Avenue in Gardena	I-215 / SR 60 in Riverside	1964	current	
SR 92	26.2	42.2	SR 1 in Half Moon Bay	Santa Clara Street in Hayward	1964	current	
SR 93	19	31	SR 77 near Moraga	I-580 in Richmond	1964	current	Unconstructed. The City of Richmond built Richmond Parkway along the proposed right-of-way within its city limits, but the state has refused to take it over until the city brings it up to the state's highway standards.
SR 94	63.324	101.910	I-5 in San Diego	I-8 near Boulevard	1934	current	
SR 96	146.519	235.799	SR 299 in Willow Creek	I-5 near Yreka	1934	current	
SR 98	56.858	91.504	I-8 near Ocotillo	I-8 east of Holtville	1934	current	
SR 99	424.85	683.73	I-5 near Wheeler Ridge	SR 36 near Red Bluff	1964	current	Formerly part of a longer route, US 99
SR 100	5	8.0	SR 1 / SR 17 near Santa Cruz	SR 1 near Santa Cruz	1964	current	Unconstructed
SR 102	37.5	60.4	I-5 near Elkhorn	I-80 near Auburn	1964	current	Unconstructed
SR 103	1.6	2.6	SR 47 near Terminal Island	SR 1 near Long Beach	1984	current	Formerly part of SR 47. The segment from SR 1 to Willow Street was relinquished to the City of Long Beach in 2000
SR 103	—	—	I-5 near Miramar	US 395 near Miramar	1964	1969	Now I-15
SR 104	36.04	58.00	SR 99 near Galt	SR 49 in Sutter Creek	1934	current	
SR 106	—	—	SR 38 in Redlands	SR 30 in Highland	1964	1972	Became part of SR 30; now SR 210; old route of SR 30 renumbered SR 330.
SR 107	4.801	7.726	SR 1 in Torrance	Lawndale city limits	1938	current	
SR 108	120	190	SR 99 / SR 132 in Modesto	US 395 near Bridgeport	1934	current	
SR 109	1.870	3.009	US 101 in East Palo Alto	SR 84 in Menlo Park	1984	current	Unsigned route
SR 109	—	—	Sunset Cliffs and Nimitz Boulevards in San Diego	I-5 in San Diego	1964	1972	Now I-8
SR 110	11.9	19.2	I-10 / I-110 in Los Angeles	Glenarm Street in Pasadena	1981	current	SR 110 once carried routings of US 99, US 6 and US 66
SR 111	130.175	209.496	East First Street along Mexican border in Calexico	I-10 near Whitewater	1934	current	
SR 112	1.9	3.1	Doolittle Drive in San Leandro	SR 185 in San Leandro	1964	current	Also signed as part of SR 61.
SR 113	59	95	SR 12 near Rio Vista	SR 99 near Yuba City	1934	current	
SR 114	0.926	1.490	US 101 in East Palo Alto	SR 84 in Menlo Park	1964	current	Unsigned route
SR 115	35.24	56.71	I-8 near Holtville	SR 111 in Calipatria	1934	current	
SR 116	46.5	74.8	SR 1 near Jenner	SR 121 near Sonoma	1964	current	
SR 117	—	—	I-5 in San Diego	Mexican border near Otay Mesa	1972	1986	Now SR 905
SR 117	5.40	8.69	San Bruno	Daly City	1964	1965	Decommissioned in favor of I-280
SR 118	47.605	76.613	SR 126 in Ventura	I-210 near San Fernando	1934	current	
SR 119	29.783	47.931	SR 33 in Taft	SR 99 near Bakersfield	1964	current	
SR 120	153	246	I-5 near Manteca	US 6 in Benton	1934	current	
SR 121	33.57	54.03	SR 37 at Sears Point	SR 128 near Lake Berryessa	1934	current	
SR 122	61.3	98.7	SR 14 near Palmdale	SR 58 near Barstow	1964	current	Unconstructed
SR 123	7.375	11.869	I-580 in Oakland	I-80 in Richmond	1934	current	
SR 124	10.33	16.62	SR 88 near Ione	SR 16 near Drytown	1934	current	
SR 125	23.839	38.365	Otay Mesa Road in Otay Mesa	SR 52 in Santee	1964	current	
SR 126	47.167	75.908	US 101 in Ventura	I-5 in Santa Clarita	1934	current	
SR 127	91.033	146.503	I-15 in Baker	SR 373 north of Death Valley Junction	1933	current	
SR 128	120.52	193.96	SR 1 near Albion	I-505 in Winters	1934	current	
SR 129	14.095	22.684	SR 1 near Watsonville	US 101 near San Juan Bautista	1964	current	
SR 130	22.503	36.215	San Jose city limit	San Antonio Valley Road on Mount Hamilton	1964	current	Unsigned portion legislatively continues to the Santa Clara–Stanislaus county line
SR 131	4.317	6.948	US 101 in Strawberry	Main Street in Tiburon	1934	current	
SR 132	76	122	I-580 near Tracy	SR 49 in Coulterville	1934	current	
SR 133	13.635	21.943	SR 1 in Laguna Beach	SR 241 near Irvine	1964	current	
SR 134	16.0	25.7	US 101 / SR 170 in Toluca Lake	I-210 / SR 710 in Pasadena	1964	current	
SR 135	21	34	US 101 in Los Alamos	US 101 / SR 166 in Santa Maria	1934	current	
SR 136	18	29	US 395 in Lone Pine	SR 190 near Keeler	1934	current	
SR 137	29	47	SR 43 near Corcoran	SR 65 near Lindsay	1934	current	
SR 138	105.376	169.586	I-5 near Gorman	SR 18 near Crestline	1934	current	
SR 139	143.26	230.55	SR 36 in Susanville	SR 161 / OR 39 in Hatfield	1946	current	
SR 140	101.645	163.582	I-5 near Gustine	Yosemite National Park	1934	current	
SR 141	1.25	2.01	SR 29 in Vallejo	I-80 in Vallejo	1964	1988	Proposed an Glen Cove Waterfront Freeway, Replaced by Curtola Parkway
SR 142	11.467	18.454	SR 90 in Brea	SR 71 in Chino Hills	1964	current	Section from SR 71 to SR 210 near Upland is unconstructed.
SR 143	19.7	31.7	SR 99 near Elk Grove	SR 244 near Carmichael	1964	current	Unconstructed
SR 144	1.95	3.14	Alameda Padre Serra in Santa Barbara	SR 192 in Santa Barbara	1934	current	
SR 145	67	108	I-5 / SR 33 near Coalinga	SR 41 near Friant	1934	current	
SR 146	12.632	20.329	US 101 near Soledad	SR 25 near Paicines	1934	current	
SR 147	11.681	18.799	SR 89 at Canyondam	SR 36 near Westwood	1934	current	
SR 148	16.3	26.2	I-5 near Sacramento	SR 65 near Sloughhouse	1964	current	Unconstructed
SR 149	4.623	7.440	SR 70 near Oroville	SR 99 near Chico	1964	current	
SR 150	36.427	58.624	US 101 in Carpinteria	SR 126 in Santa Paula	1964	current	
SR 151	6.925	11.145	Shasta Dam	I-5 in Shasta Lake	1934	current	
SR 152	104.419	168.046	SR 1 in Watsonville	SR 99 near Chowchilla	1934	current	
SR 153	0.55	0.89	James W. Marshall Monument in Marshall Gold Discovery State Historic Park	SR 49 in Coloma	1934	current	
SR 154	32.3	52.0	US 101 near Los Olivos	US 101 in Santa Barbara	1964	current	
SR 155	74.79	120.36	SR 99 in Delano	SR 178 near Lake Isabella	1964	current	
SR 156	26	42	SR 1 near Castroville	SR 152 near Hollister	1964	current	
SR 157	—	—	I-805 in San Diego	SR 125 near Sweetwater Reservoir	1964	1994	Planned since 1964 but never fully constructed
SR 158	15.828	25.473	US 395 at June Lake Junction	US 395 south of Lee Vining	1964	current	
SR 159	—	—	SR 134 in Pasadena	I-210 in La Cañada Flintridge	1964	1992	
SR 160	49.651	79.906	SR 4 in Antioch	BL 80 in Sacramento	1964	current	
SR 161	19.36	31.16	US 97 near Dorris	SR 139 / OR 39 in Hatfield	1964	current	
SR 162	93.25	150.07	US 101 in Longvale	Foreman Creek Road in Brush Creek	1964	current	
SR 163	11.088	17.844	A Street & Ash Street in San Diego	I-15 in San Diego	1972	current	Former US 395
SR 163	—	—	Lacy Street & Avenue 26 in Los Angeles	I-5 in Los Angeles	1964	1965	
SR 164	9.56	15.39	Gallatin Road in Pico Rivera	Foothill Road in Pasadena	1964	current	Signed as part of SR 19 except off of I-210. Segment between Grand Avenue in Temple City and I-210 in Pasadena has been relinquished.
SR 165	38.27	61.59	I-5 near Los Banos	SR 99 in Turlock	1970	current	
SR 165	—	—	I-5 in Los Angeles	SR 60 in Los Angeles	1964	1965	
SR 166	95.886	154.314	SR 1 in Guadalupe	SR 99 in Mettler	1964	current	
SR 167	21.331	34.329	US 395 in Mono City	SR 359 east of Mono City	1964	current	
SR 168	124	200	SR 41 / SR 180 in Fresno	SR 266 in Oasis	1934	current	
SR 169	23.867	38.410	US 101 in Klamath	SR 96 in Weitchpec	1919	current	
SR 170	9.8	15.8	US 101 in Los Angeles	I-5 in Los Angeles	1964	current	
SR 171	—	—	I-5 in San Diego	I-805 in San Diego	1964	1994	Planned since 1964 but never fully constructed.
SR 172	8.917	14.351	SR 36 in Mineral	SR 36 / SR 89 east of Mineral	1964	current	
SR 173	24.944	40.143	SR 138 in Hesperia	SR 18 near Lake Arrowhead	1964	current	
SR 174	13.096	21.076	I-80 in Colfax	SR 20 / SR 49 in Grass Valley	1964	current	
SR 175	37.89	60.98	US 101 in Hopland	SR 29 in Middletown	1964	current	
SR 176	—	—	US 101 in Santa Maria	Sisquoc	1964	1994	
SR 177	27.024	43.491	I-10 near Desert Center	SR 62 near Rice	1972	current	
SR 177	—	—	SR 79 near San Jacinto	SR 60 near Moreno Valley	1964	1965	Ran along Gilman Springs Road
SR 178	167	269	SR 58 / SR 99 in Bakersfield	SR 372 near Pahrump	1934	current	
SR 179	13.8	22.2	I-80 near Vacaville	SR 128 near Lake Berryessa	1964	current	Unconstructed
SR 180	112.31	180.75	SR 33 in Mendota	General Grant Grove	1934	current	
SR 181	9.5	15.3	SR 116 near Forestville	US 101 near Santa Rosa	1964	current	Unconstructed
SR 182	12.645	20.350	US 395 in Bridgeport	SR 338 north of Bridgeport	1964	current	
SR 183	10.969	17.653	US 101 in Salinas	SR 1 in Castroville	1933	current	
SR 184	14.139	22.755	SR 223 near Arvin	SR 178 in Bakersfield	1964	current	
SR 185	10.826	17.423	SR 92 / SR 238 in Hayward	I-880 in Oakland	1964	current	
SR 186	2.07	3.33	Mexican border near Los Algodones	I-8 near Winterhaven	1972	current	
SR 186	—	—	SR 1 near Pacifica	SR 87	1964	1969	Now I-380; section from US 101 to SR 87 deleted 1970; section from SR 1 to I-280 is unconstructed
SR 187	5.405	8.699	SR 1 in Venice	I-10 near Culver City	1964	current	
SR 188	1.85	2.98	Mexican border in Tecate	SR 94 near Potrero	1972	current	
SR 188	—	—	south end of Fallen Lake	SR 89 near Camp Richardson	1964	1965	
SR 189	5.565	8.956	SR 18 near Crestline	SR 173 in Lake Arrowhead	1964	current	
SR 190	187.59	301.90	SR 99 at Tipton	SR 127 at Death Valley Junction	1964	current	
SR 191	11.387	18.326	SR 70 near Oroville	Pearson Road in Paradise	1964	current	
SR 192	21.043	33.865	SR 154 near Santa Barbara	SR 150 near Carpinteria	1964	current	
SR 193	37	60	Lincoln city limit	SR 49 in Placerville	1964	current	
SR 194	—	—	I-15 near Temecula	I-15 near Devore	1974	1982	former I-15E; now I-215
SR 194	—	—	SR 49 near Downieville	Eureka Mine Road near Saddleback Mountain	1964	1965	
SR 195	7.42	11.94	Harrison Street near Oasis	SR 111 in Mecca	1964	2014	
SR 196	—	—	SR 2	SR 249 south of Palmdale	1964	1965	Was decommissioned before any segment was constructed
SR 197	6.725	10.823	US 199 near Hiouchi	US 101 near Fort Dick	1964	current	
SR 198	141.273	227.357	US 101 near San Lucas	Sequoia National Park	1964	current	
SR 200	2.681	4.315	US 101 near McKinleyville	SR 299 near Blue Lake	1964	current	
SR 201	25.3	40.7	SR 99 in Kingsburg	SR 245 north of Woodlake	1933	current	
SR 202	10.53	16.95	California Correctional Institution	SR 58 near Tehachapi	1964	current	
SR 203	8.67	13.95	Minaret Summit	US 395 near Mammoth Lakes	1964	current	
SR 204	6.76	10.88	SR 58 in Bakersfield	SR 99 near Oildale	1964	current	
SR 206	8	13	Highland Avenue in San Bernardino	I-215 near Verdemont	1964	1991	Ran along North E Street, Kendall Drive and Palm Avenue to I-215
SR 207	1.36	2.19	SR 4 near Bear Valley	Bear Valley	1979	current	
SR 207	—	—	SR 152 west of Los Banos	SR 33	1964	1972	Became part of SR 33, its pre-1964 designation
SR 208	—	—	SR 1 in Rockport	US 101 in Leggett	1964	1984	Now SR 1, its pre-1964 designation (SR 1 was split before 1964; it went along both current and along proposed SR 211 route that was unsigned).
SR 209	8	13	Cabrillo National Monument	I-5 / I-8 in San Diego	1964	2003	Ran along Catalina Boulevard, Canon Street and Rosecrans Street to I-8
SR 210	40.41	65.03	I-210 / SR 57 in Glendora	I-10 in Redlands	2007	current	Proposed to be added to I-210
SR 211	5.395	8.682	Ocean Avenue in Ferndale	US 101 in Fernbridge	1984	current	Formerly the non-contiguous, northernmost segment of SR 1; Current SR 1 north of Usal Road was SR 208.
SR 211	—	—	SR 99 in Delano	SR 65 in Woody	1964	1965	Now SR 155
SR 212	—	—	Los Angeles	I-10 in El Monte	1964	1965	Ran along Valley Boulevard
SR 213	7.984	12.849	25th Street in San Pedro	Carson Street in Torrance	1964	current	
SR 214	—	—	SR 19 in Long Beach	I-5 in Anaheim	1964	1998	Ran along Carson Street from SR 19 to Los Angeles/Orange County Line and Lincoln Avenue from Los Angeles/Orange County Line to I-5
SR 215	29.91	48.14	I-15 in Murrieta	SR 60 in Moreno Valley	1982	1994	Now part of I-215 after being upgraded to Interstate standards
SR 215	—	—	SR 60 in Pomona	SR 66 west of Claremont	1964	1965	Ran along Garey Avenue
SR 216	18.275	29.411	SR 198 in Visalia	SR 198 near Woodlake	1964	current	
SR 217	2.525	4.064	UC Santa Barbara	US 101 in Goleta	1964	current	
SR 218	2.85	4.59	SR 1 in Seaside	SR 68 in Del Rey Oaks	1964	current	
SR 219	4.7	7.6	SR 99 in Salida	SR 108 near Modesto	1964	current	
SR 220	6	9.7	SR 84 near Rio Vista	SR 160 near Walnut Grove	1964	current	
SR 221	2.682	4.316	SR 12 / SR 29 near Vallejo	SR 121 in Napa	1964	current	
SR 222	1.626	2.617	US 101 in Ukiah	East Side Road in Talmage	1964	current	Unsigned
SR 223	31.92	51.37	I-5 near Taft	SR 58 near Arvin	1964	current	
SR 224	1.8	2.9	Carpinteria State Beach	US 101 in Carpinteria	1964	1996	Ran along Casitas Pass Road
SR 225	4.643	7.472	US 101 in Santa Barbara	US 101 in Santa Barbara	1964	2014	Still remains in the route log, as if the entire route was relinquished instead of decommissioned
SR 226	—	—	SR 63 near Orosi	Orange Cove	1964	1965	Now SR 63, which extended to SR 180 also
SR 227	15.612	25.125	US 101 in Arroyo Grande	US 101 in San Luis Obispo	1964	current	
SR 228	—	—	SR 86	West of Brawley	1964	1998	Planned since 1964 but never fully constructed
SR 229	9.16	14.74	SR 58 near Atascadero	SR 41 near Creston	1964	current	
SR 230	4.1	6.6	US 101 in San Francisco	I-280 in San Francisco	1964	current	Unconstructed
SR 231	—	—	I-5 in Irvine	SR 91 in Anaheim	1988	1996	Replaced by segments of SR 133 and SR 241 along the Eastern Toll Road
SR 231	—	—	SR 86 near Mecca	SR 195 near Mecca	1964	1972	Ran along Avenue 66
SR 232	4.11	6.61	US 101 in Oxnard	SR 118 near Saticoy	1964	current	
SR 233	3.882	6.247	SR 152 near Chowchilla	SR 99 near Chowchilla	1964	current	
SR 234	3.4	5.5	I-5 in French Camp	SR 99 east of French Camp	1964	current	Unconstructed
SR 235	5	8.0	I-5 north of Stockton	SR 99 north of Stockton	1964	current	Unconstructed
SR 236	17.721	28.519	SR 9 in Boulder Creek	SR 9 north of Boulder Creek	1964	current	
SR 237	11	18	SR 82 in Mountain View	I-680 in Milpitas	1964	current	
SR 238	14.393	23.163	I-680 in Fremont	I-238 / I-580 in Castro Valley	1964	current	Former northernmost segment is now I-238; section from I-580 to SR 61 is unconstructed.
SR 239	17	27	I-580 west of Tracy	SR 4 near Brentwood	1964	current	Unconstructed
SR 240	—	—	SR 1 near Seal Beach	I-405 in Seal Beach	1964	1968	Now I-605 from I-405 to SR 22; section from SR 22 to SR 1 is unconstructed but proposed to be I-605
SR 241	24.534	39.484	Oso Parkway near Rancho Santa Margarita	SR 91 in Anaheim / Yorba Linda	1988	current	Section from Oso Parkway to I-5 is unconstructed.
SR 241	2.69	4.33	SR 1 in San Francisco	US 101 near Fell and Oak Streets in San Francisco	1968	1972	Former I-80; was never constructed
SR 241	—	—	I-110 in Los Angeles	SR 110 in Los Angeles	1964	1965	Never built
SR 242	3.398	5.469	I-680 at the Pleasant Hill–Concord line	SR 4 north of Concord	1964	current	
SR 243	29.625	47.677	SR 74 near Mountain Center	I-10 in Banning	1970	current	
SR 243	—	—	I-10 in Baldwin Park	I-210 in Irwindale	1964	1968	Now I-605
SR 244	1.08	1.74	I-80 in North Highlands	Auburn Boulevard in Sacramento	1964	current	Unsigned
SR 245	42	68	SR 198 near Exeter	SR 180 near Dunlap	1972	current	
SR 245	—	—	I-5 near Los Angeles	SR 60 near Los Angeles	1964	1965	
SR 246	26	42	Lompoc western city limit	SR 154 in Santa Ynez	1964	current	
SR 247	78.084	125.664	SR 62 in Yucca Valley	I-15 in Barstow	1964	current	
SR 248	—	—	SR 134 near Pasadena	I-210 in Monrovia	1964	1992	Was signed as part of US 66; now Colorado Boulevard
SR 249	13.5	21.7	SR 2 north of La Cañada	SR 14 south of Palmdale	1964	current	Unconstructed; Angeles Forest Highway (CR N3) follows the general alignment.
SR 250	—	—	I-5 in Orange	SR 91 in Anaheim	1964	1981	Ran along State College Boulevard
SR 251	20.11	32.36	State Route 1 near Point Reyes Station	I-580 near Point San Quentin	1964	current	Unconstructed; section from US 101 to I-580 is Sir Francis Drake Boulevard and is proposed to be changed to SR 251
SR 252	—	—	I-5 in National City	I-805 in National City	1964	1994	Proposed in 1964 but never fully constructed
SR 253	17.18	27.65	SR 128 in Boonville	US 101 in Ukiah	1964	current	
SR 254	31.595	50.847	US 101 near Phillipsville	US 101 near Stafford	1964	current	Former routing of US 101
SR 255	8.789	14.145	US 101 in Eureka	US 101 in Arcata	1964	current	
SR 256	2.44	3.93	I-80 in Roseville	SR 65 in Roseville	1965	1994	Proposed in 1964 but never fully constructed
SR 257	19.6	31.5	SR 34	US 101 near Ventura	1965	current	Unconstructed
SR 258	17	27	I-405 near Torrance	US 101 near Hollywood	1965	current	Unconstructed; the traversable route along Western Avenue has never been adopted by Caltrans and thus remains in local control; proposed to become a freeway
SR 259	1.48	2.38	I-215 in San Bernardino	SR 210 in San Bernardino	1965	current	Signed in 2022
SR 260	1.924	3.096	Webster Street / Atlantic Avenue in Alameda	I-880 in Oakland	1965	current	Signed as part of SR 61, but also as SR 260.
SR 261	6.12	9.85	Walnut Avenue in Irvine	SR 241 near Orange	1991	current	
SR 261	64.96	104.54	US 101 near Longvale	I-5 near Willows	1965	1972	
SR 262	1.07	1.72	I-880 in Fremont	I-680 in Fremont	1965	current	
SR 263	8.125	13.076	SR 3 in Yreka	SR 96 north of Yreka	1965	current	Formerly part of US 99
SR 265	0.527	0.848	US 97 in Weed	I-5 in Weed	1965	current	Co-signed with BL 5
SR 266	11.721	18.863	SR 266 south of Oasis	SR 264 north of Oasis	1965	current	
SR 267	12.69	20.42	I-80 / SR 89 in Truckee	SR 28 in Kings Beach	1965	current	
SR 268	—	—	SR 27	I-405	1965	1970	Mulholland Drive; never constructed
SR 269	30	48	SR 33 in Avenal	SR 145 near Kerman	1972	current	
SR 270	9.805	15.780	US 395 near Bridgeport	Bodie	1970	current	
SR 271	14.84	23.88	US 101 in Cummings	US 101 in Cooks Valley	1970	current	Former routing of US 101
SR 273	16.23	26.12	I-5 in Anderson	I-5 in Redding	1967	current	Formerly part of US 99
SR 274	—	—	I-5 in San Diego	I-15 in San Diego	1965	1999	Ran along Balboa Avenue
SR 275	—	—	I-80 in West Sacramento	9th Street and Capitol Mall in Sacramento	1967	1996	
SR 275	0.14	0.23	West Sacramento	Sacramento	2010	current	Unsigned route; currently the shortest state highway in California
SR 276	8	13	SR 198 near Three Rivers	Oak Grove	1965	current	Unconstructed
SR 280	1.8	2.9	I-280 and King Street in San Francisco	I-80 in San Francisco	1991	current	Unconstructed northern extension of I-280
SR 281	3	4.8	Soda Bay Road at Clear Lake	SR 29 near Glenview	1970	current	
SR 282	0.691	1.112	Naval Air Station North Island	SR 75 in Coronado	1967	current	
SR 283	0.356	0.573	US 101 near Scotia	US 101 in Rio Dell	1970	current	Former routing of US 101
SR 284	8.302	13.361	SR 70 in Chilcoot	Frenchman Lake	1970	current	
SR 285	—	—	SR 70 in Portola	Grizzly Reservoir	1970	1998	Planned since 1970 but never fully constructed
SR 299	305.777	492.100	US 101 in Arcata	Former NV 8A east of Cedarville	1964	current	
SR 330	15.422	24.819	SR 210 in San Bernardino	SR 18 in Running Springs	1972	current	
SR 371	20.753	33.399	SR 79 in Aguanga	SR 74 near Anza	1974	current	
SR 380	4.0	6.4	SR 1 near Pacifica	I-280 / I-380 in San Bruno	1969	current	Unconstructed western extension of I-380
SR 480	—	—	US 101 in San Francisco	I-80 in San Francisco	1968	1991	Originally planned as I-480. Demolished in 1991.
SR 605	3	4.8	I-405 / California State Route 22 in Seal Beach	California State Route 1 in Seal Beach	1957	current	Unconstructed southern extension of I-605
SR 710	1.77	2.85	California Boulevard in Pasadena	I-210 / SR 134 in Pasadena	1984	current	Formerly part of SR 7; Route not signed
SR 905	8.964	14.426	I-5 in San Diego	Mexican border in San Diego	1986	current	Future I-905; section from I-5 south to Mexico is unconstructed
Former

=== Top 10 longest routes ===
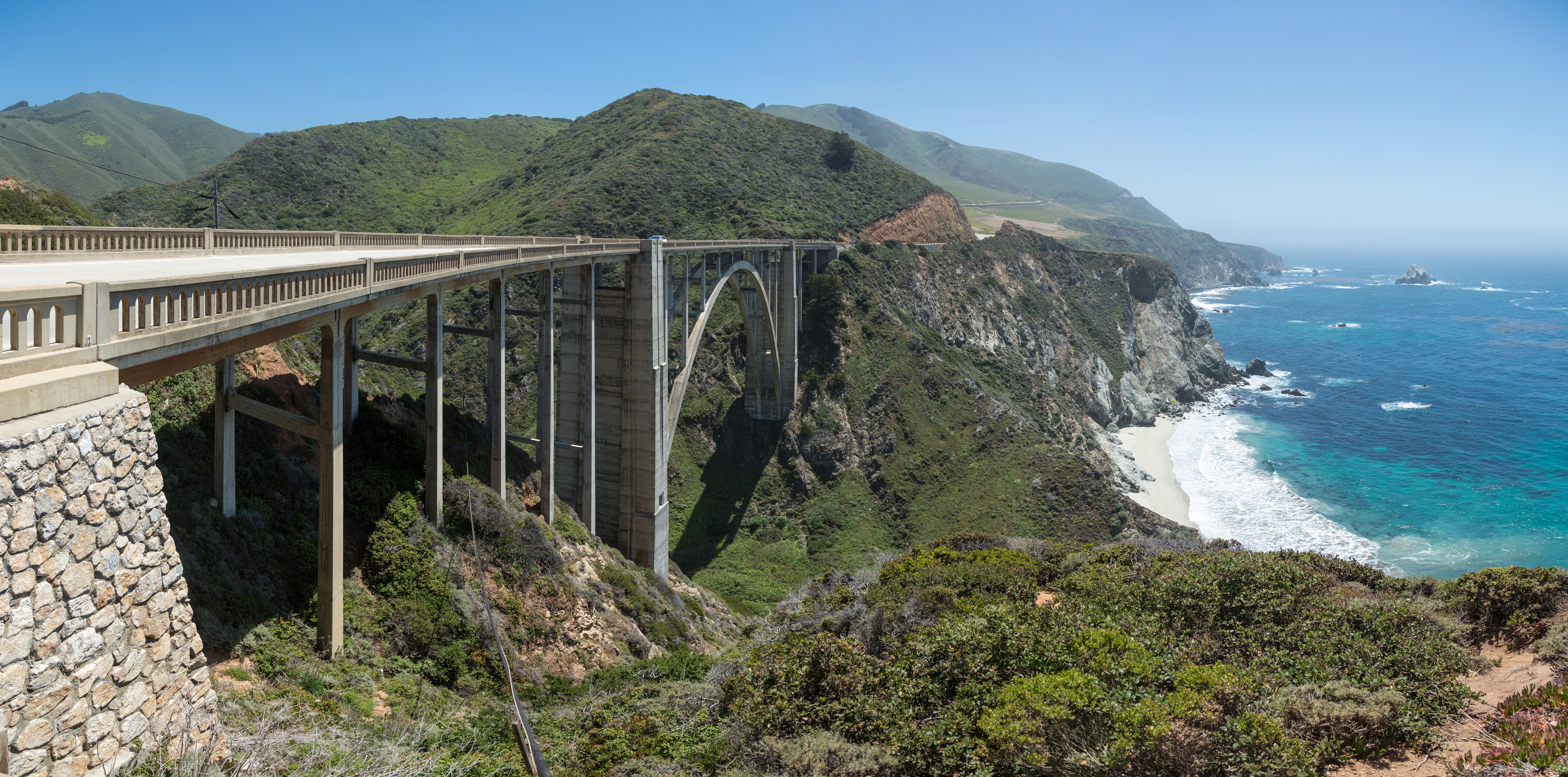
The Bixby Creek Bridge in Big Sur on SR 1

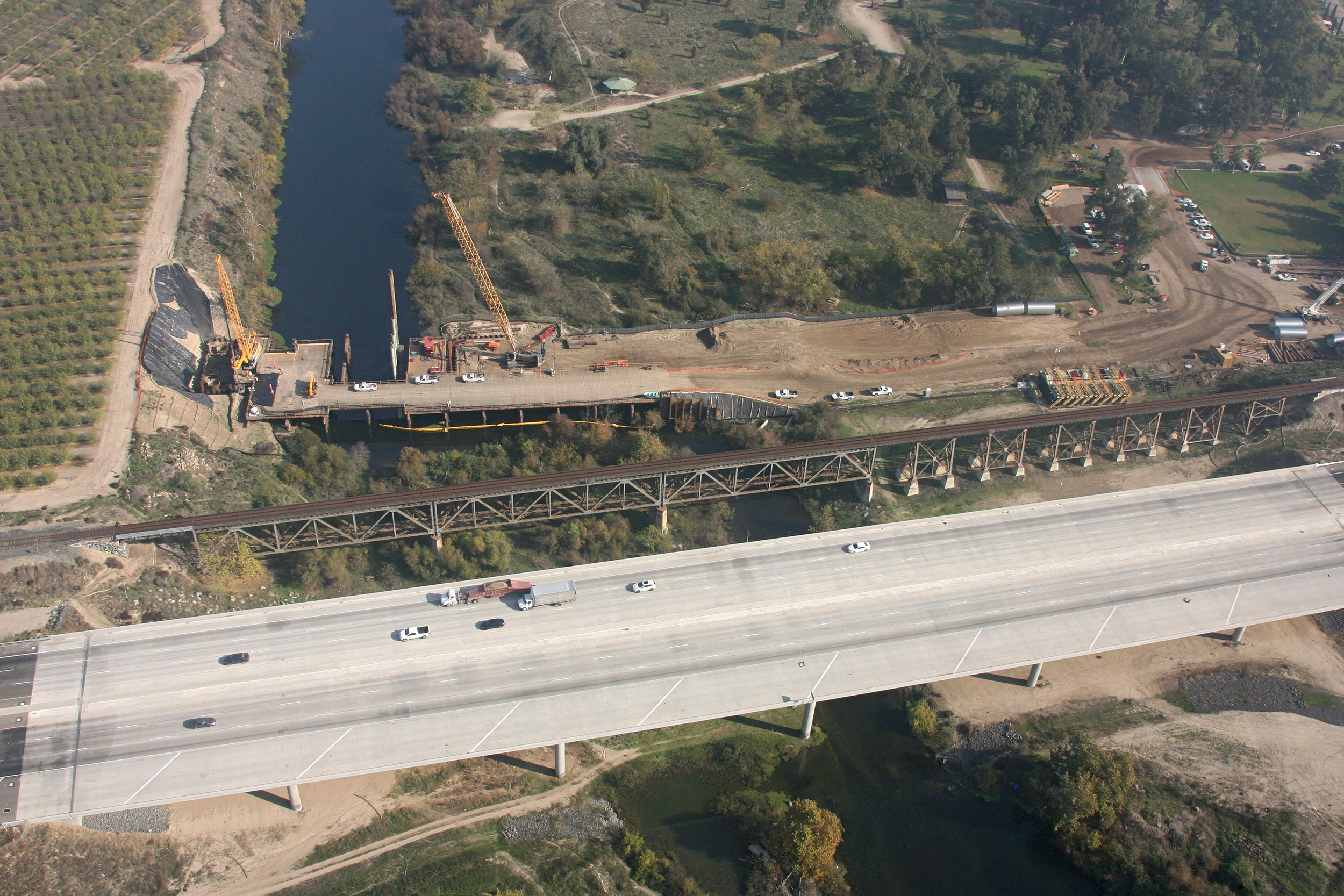
SR 99 crossing the San Joaquin River at the Fresno–Madera county line

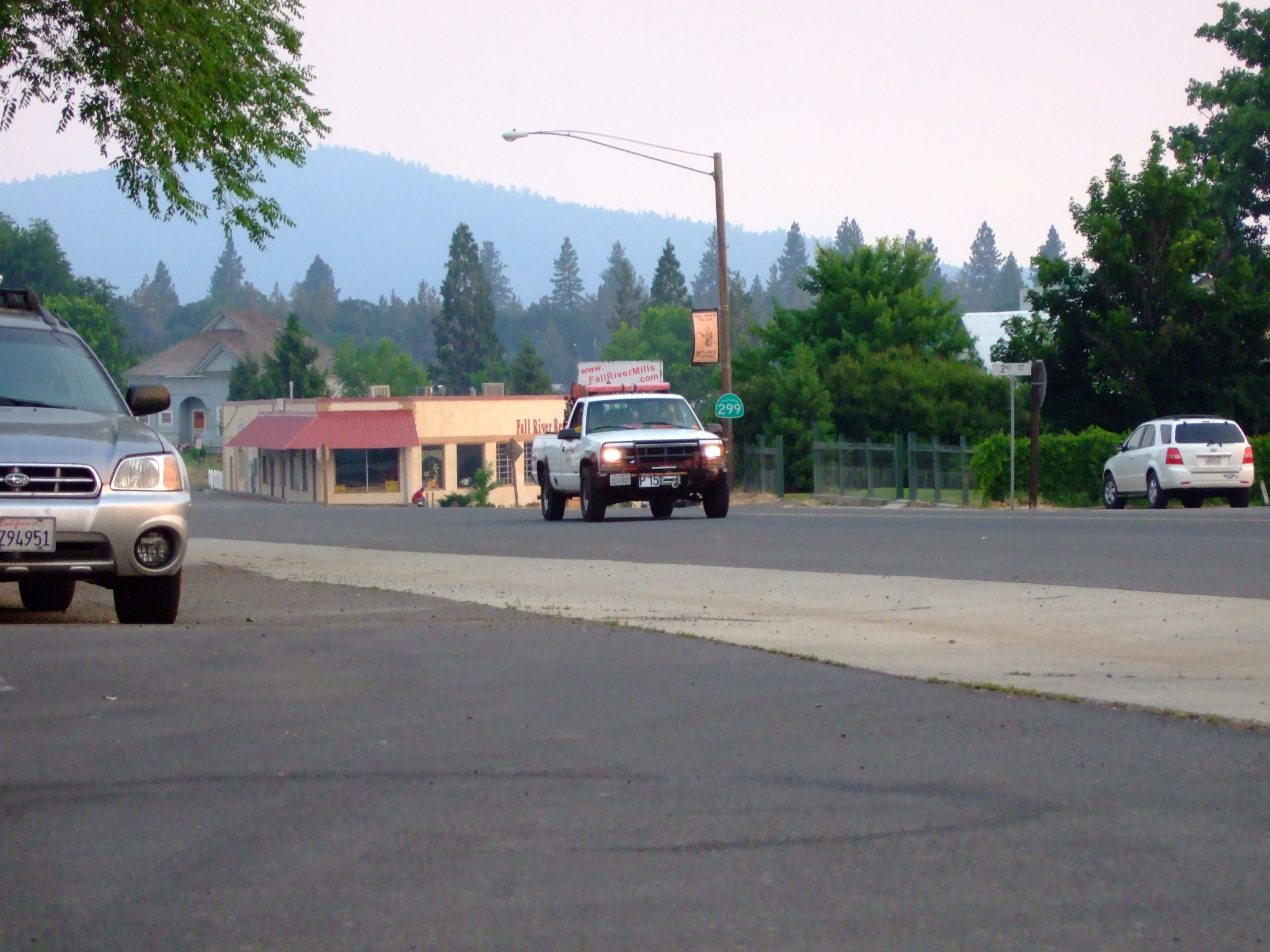
SR 299 in Fall River Mills

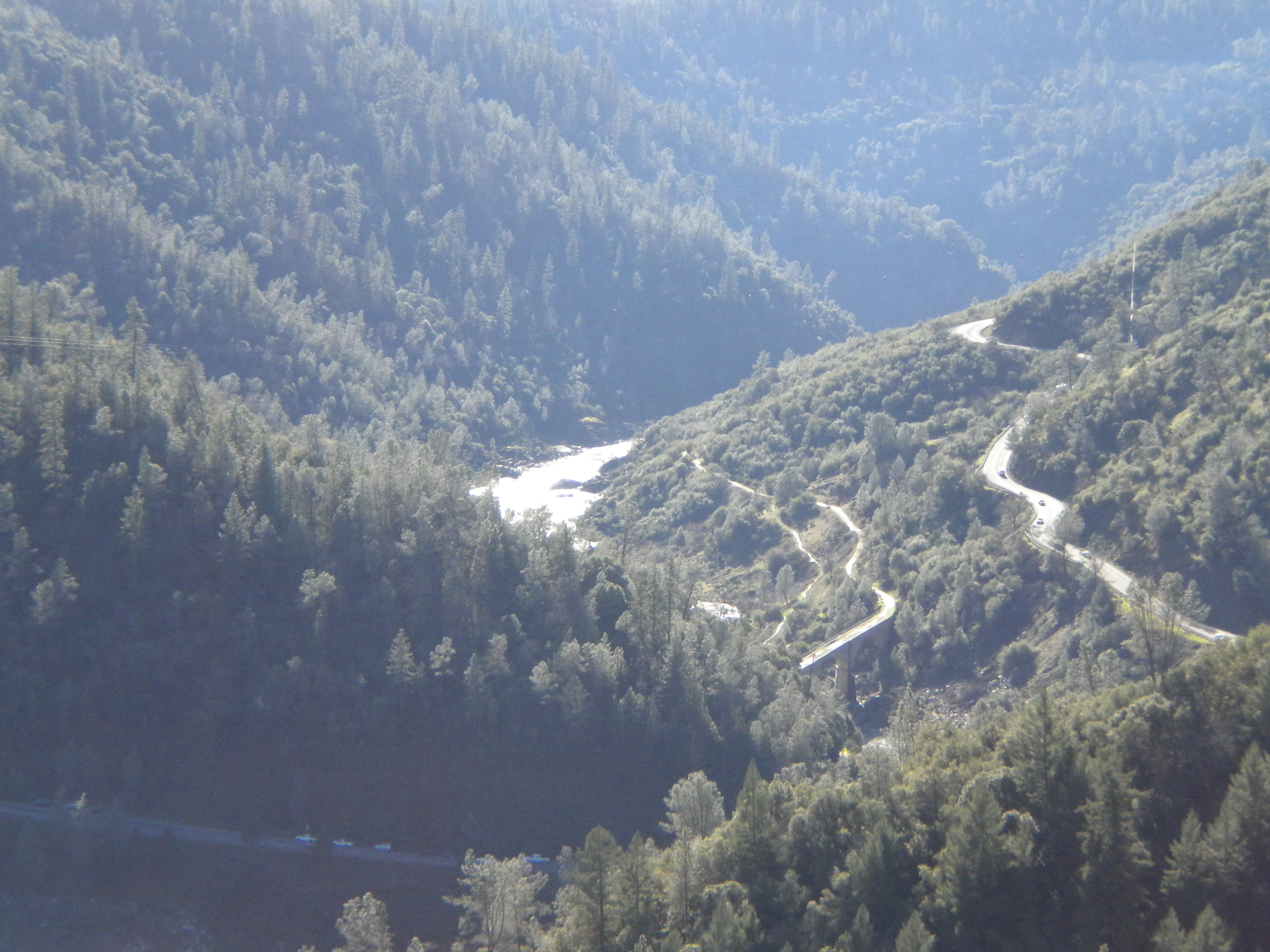
SR 49 crossing the American River North/Middle Fork, as seen from Foresthill Bridge

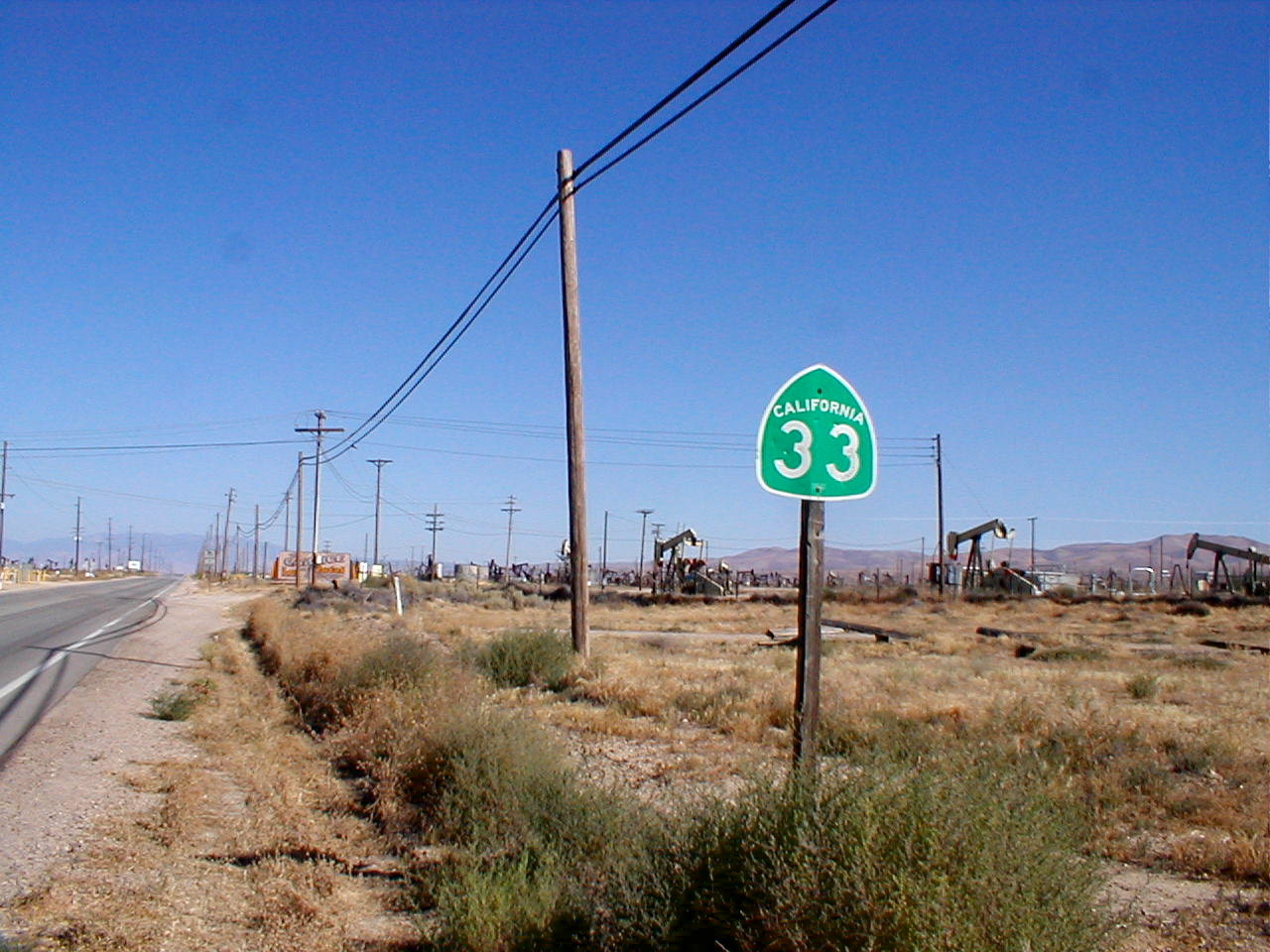
SR 33 in Kern County

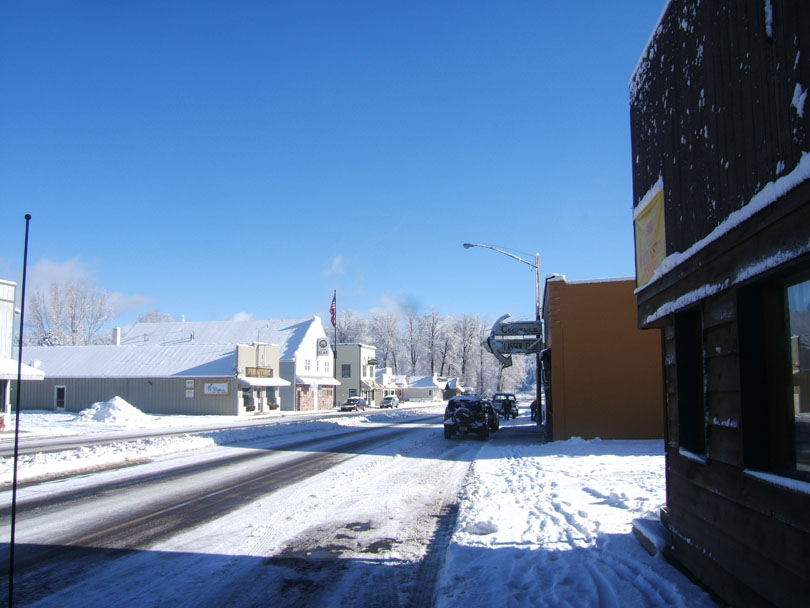
SR 36 through Chester

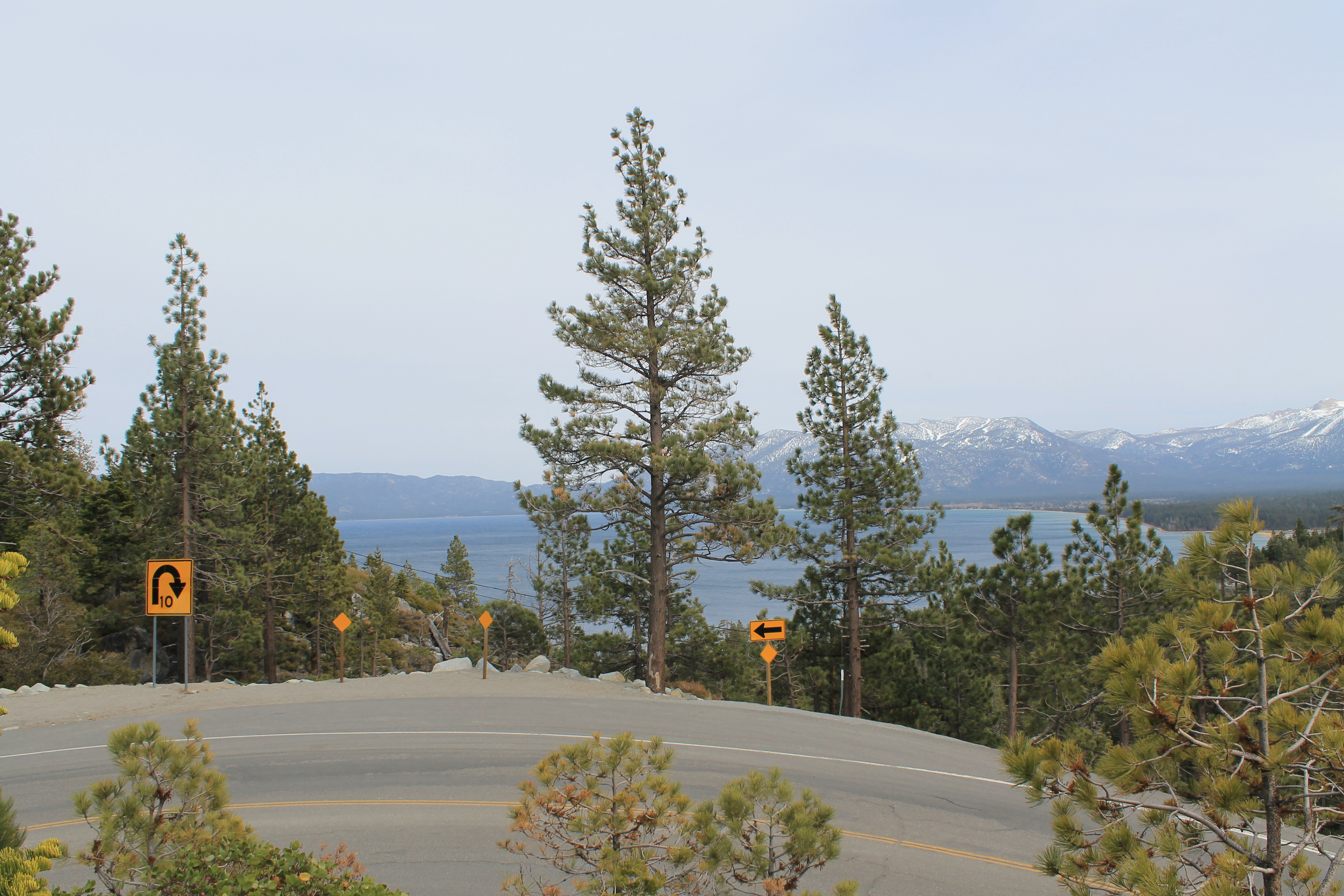
SR 89 through Emerald Bay State Park overlooking Lake Tahoe

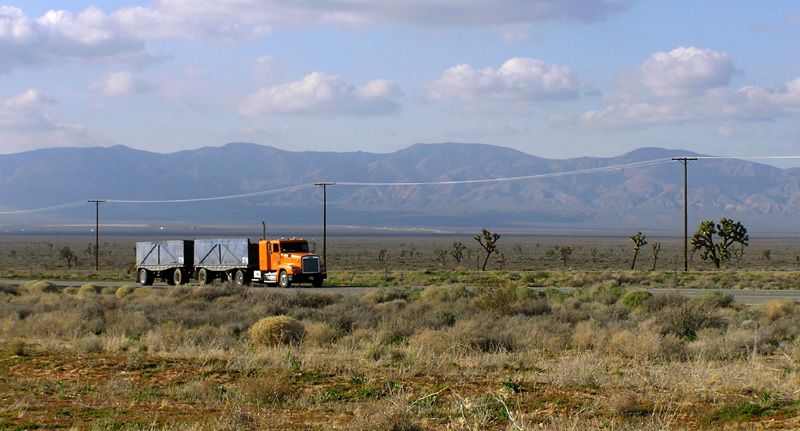
A truck on SR 58 just north of Edwards Air Force Base

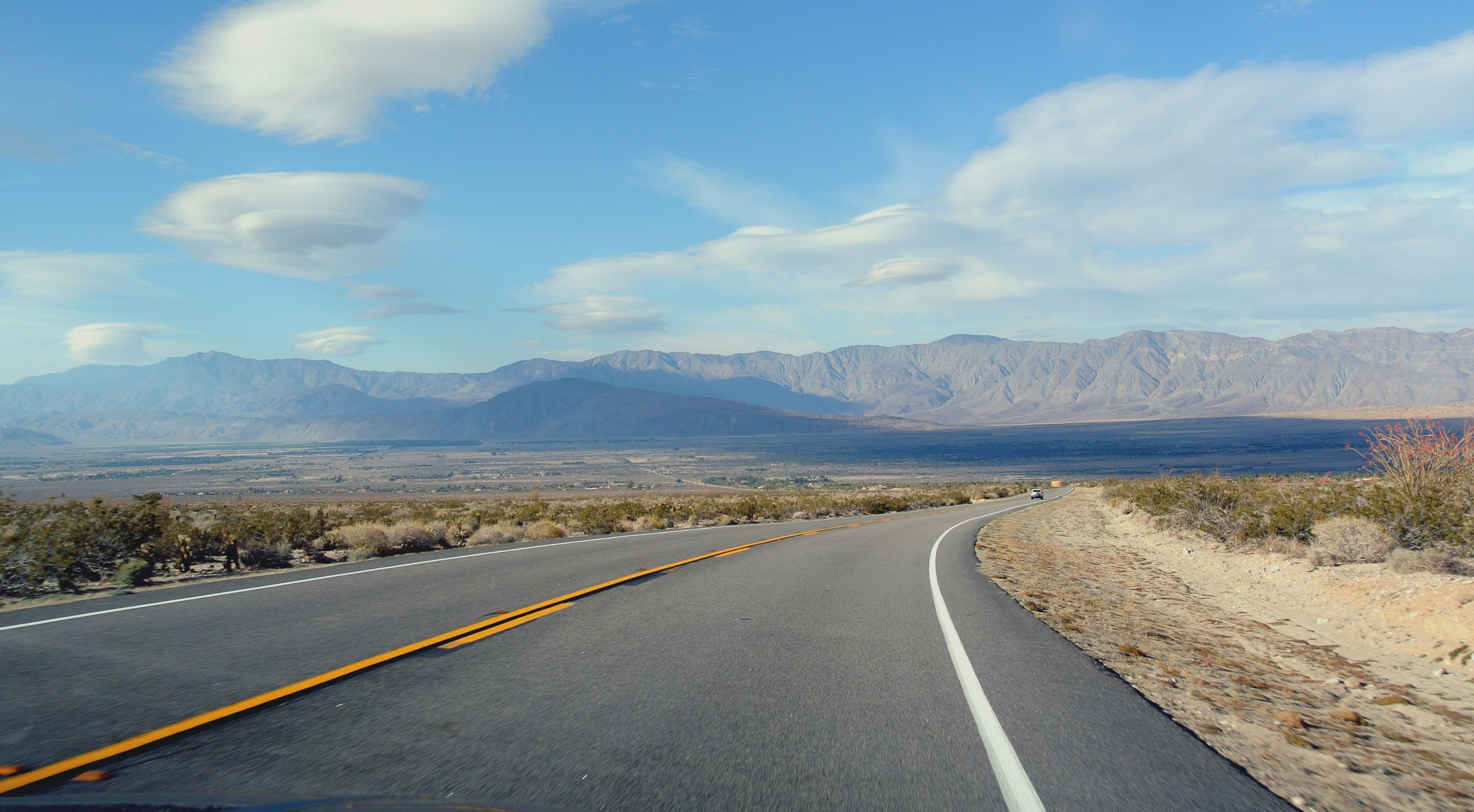
SR 78 eastbound in Anza-Borrego Desert State Park

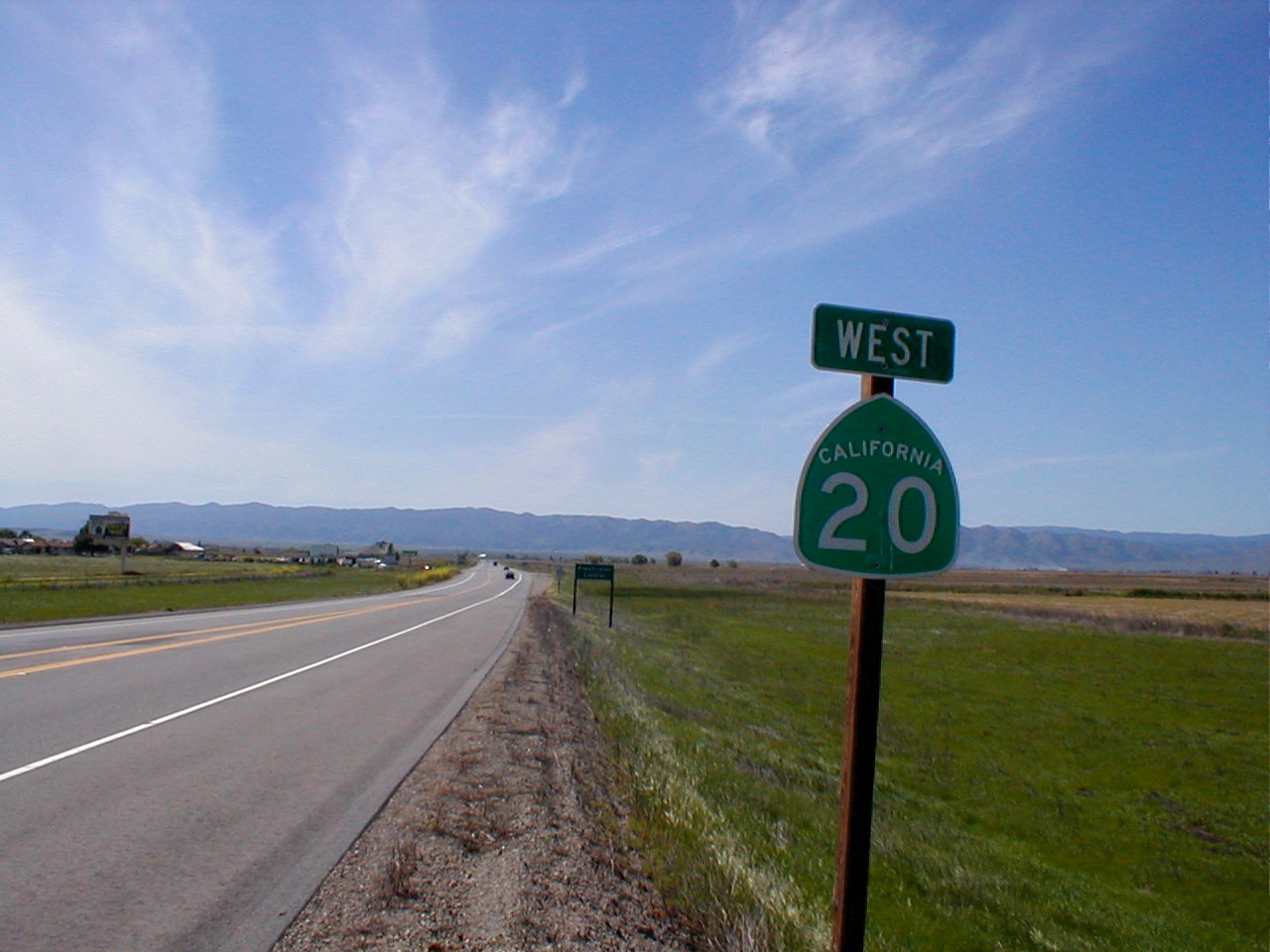
SR 20 in Colusa County

== Special routes ==
- Highways designated by Caltrans with the suffix of "U" are considered "unrelinquished". A segment is intended to be relinquished to local control because a newer alignment has been built, or the legislative definition has been changed to omit the section, but the state still owns the roadway. For example, SR 14U is an old alignment of SR 14 whose control has not yet been transferred to the City of Santa Clarita.
- Highways designated by Caltrans with the suffix of "S" are considered "supplemental". For example, an expressway replacement for SR 86 in Riverside County was initially signed as SR 86S until it was eventually transferred to SR 86.

Number	Length (mi)	Length (km)	Southern or western terminus	Northern or eastern terminus	Formed	Removed	Notes
SR 5S	0.594	0.956	I-5 in Los Angeles	Colorado Street in Glendale	1954	current	Unsigned designation for the Colorado Street Freeway Extension
SR 5S	3.059	4.923	I-5 in Los Angeles	I-5 in Los Angeles	1954	current	Unsigned designation for the Newhall Pass truck route along I-5
SR 8U	0.17	0.27	Arizona state line near the Colorado River	I-8 in Winterhaven	1964	current	Signed as I-8 Business; former US 80
SR 10S	11.645	18.741	Alameda Street in Los Angeles	Santa Anita Avenue in El Monte	1973	current	Unsigned designation for the El Monte Busway which runs parallel to the north side of I-10
SR 14U	3.92	6.31	I-5 in Los Angeles	Via Princessa in Santa Clarita	1964	current	Formerly part of US 6 and SR 14
SR 15S	18.97	30.53	I-15/SR 163 interchange in San Diego	I-15 near Escondido Creek in San Diego	1988	current	Unsigned designation for I-15 Express Lanes in San Diego County
SR 58U	6.876	11.066	Old Highway 58 near Boron	Twenty Mule Team Road near Kramer Junction	2020	current	Unsigned designation for former right-of-way of SR 58 which runs parallel to current SR 58.
SR 86S	—	—	SR 86 in Oasis	I-10 in Indio	1964	2012	Expressway bypass for SR 86 before the SR 86 designation was transferred to the routing of SR 86S
SR 101U	1.421	2.287	North Main Street at Willits city limits	north end of Redwood Highway near DeCamp	2016	current	Unsigned designation for former right-of-way of US 101 running parallel to the west of current US 101.
SR 156U	6.9	11.1	SR 156 near Hollister	SR 156 near Hollister	1964	current	Signed as SR 156 Business
SR 178S	0.397	0.639	SR 178 in Bakersfield	SR 204 in Bakersfield	1975	current	Unsigned designation for former right-of-way of SR 178 which runs parallel south of SR 178.
SR 180S	12.8	20.6	SR 180 in Fresno	SR 180 in Fresno	1964	2012	Freeway replacement for SR 180; signed as SR 180
SR 210U	5.394	8.681	Juniper Avenue in Fontana	Southern Pacific railroad bridge in San Bernardino	2007	current	Former right-of-way of SR 30, former SR 30 Business
SR 880S	1.463	2.354	I-80 in Oakland	I-880 in Oakland	1997	current	Unsigned designation for the bridge over Grand Avenue in Oakland connecting I-80 to I-880 via the toll plaza.
Former

== See also ==
- California Freeway and Expressway System
