= California State Route 45 =

Highway in California

State Route 45

- SR 45 highlighted in red

Route information
- Maintained by Caltrans
- Length: 70 mi (110 km)
- Existed: 1934–present

Major junctions
- South end: SR 113 at Knights Landing
- SR 20 from near Sycamore to Colusa; SR 162 from Codora to Glenn
- North end: SR 32 at Hamilton City

Location
- Country: United States
- State: California
- Counties: Yolo, Colusa, Glenn

Highway system
- State highways in California; Interstate; US; State; Scenic; History; Pre‑1964; Unconstructed; Deleted; Freeways
← SR 44	→ SR 46

State Route 45 (SR 45) is a state highway in the U.S. State of California that travels in a north–south direction in the Sacramento Valley from Route 113 in Knights Landing to Route 32 in Hamilton City.

== Route description ==
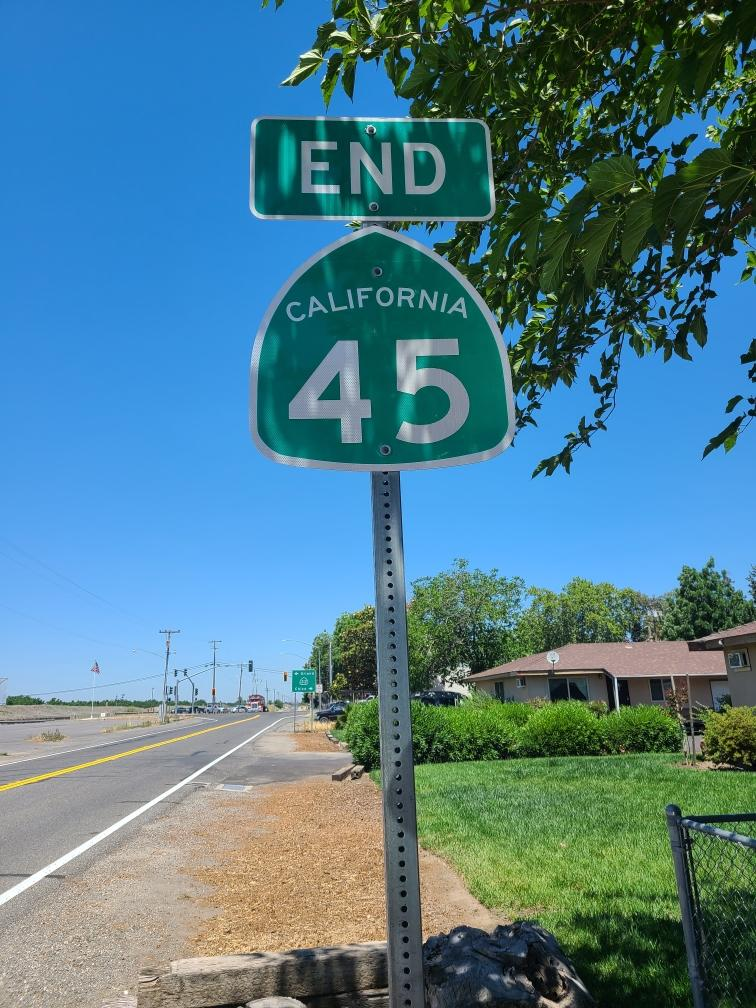
End of Route 45 at Route 32 in Hamilton City

Route 45 is defined in section 345 of the California Streets and Highways Code. The definition omits the concurrency with Route 20 instead of duplicating that segment in the other route's definition in the code:

Route 45 is from:
(a) Route 113 near Knights Landing to Route 20 near Sycamore.
(b) Route 20 near Colusa to Route 32 near Hamilton City.

The route begins at SR 113 in Knights Landing in Yolo County. It then heads northward and enters Colusa County, where it has a short overlap with SR 20. It then enters Glenn County, where it overlaps SR 162 through the cities of Codora and Glenn. It then continues northward to its end at SR 32 in Hamilton City.

SR 45 is part of the California Freeway and Expressway System, but is not part of the National Highway System, a network of highways that are considered essential to the country's economy, defense, and mobility by the Federal Highway Administration.

== Major intersections ==
Except where prefixed with a letter, postmiles were measured on the road as it was in 1964, based on the alignment that existed at the time, and do not necessarily reflect current mileage. Postmile prefixes include: R reflecting a realignment in the route since then, M indicating a second realignment, L referring to an overlap due to a correction or change, and T indicating postmiles classified as temporary. Segments that remain unconstructed or have been relinquished to local control may be omitted. The numbers reset at county lines; the start and end postmiles in each county are given in the county column.

County	Location	Postmile	Destinations	Notes
Yolo; YOL 0.00-12.92	Knights Landing	0.00	4th Street	Continuation beyond SR 113
Yolo; YOL 0.00-12.92	Knights Landing	0.00	SR 113 (Locust Street) – Robbins, Yuba City, Woodland	South end of SR 45
Yolo; YOL 0.00-12.92		5.80	CR E11 (Road 98A)	
Colusa; COL 0.00-34.18		19.85 36.79 (Note: Indicates that the postmile represents the distance along SR 20 rather than SR 45.)	SR 20 east – Meridian, Yuba City	South end of SR 20 overlap
Colusa; COL 0.00-34.18	Colusa	31.09 19.86	SR 20 west (10th Street) – Williams, Clearlake	North end of SR 20 overlap
Colusa; COL 0.00-34.18		24.53	Maxwell Road to I-5 – Maxwell	
Glenn; GLE 0.00-23.23	Codora	3.06	SR 162 east / Road 61 – Butte City, Oroville	South end of SR 162 overlap
Glenn; GLE 0.00-23.23	Glenn	7.53	SR 162 west – Willows	North end of SR 162 overlap
Glenn; GLE 0.00-23.23	Hamilton City	23.23	SR 32 (6th Street) – Chico, Orland	North end of SR 45
Glenn; GLE 0.00-23.23	Hamilton City	23.23	Canal Street (Road 203)	Continuation beyond SR 32
1.000 mi = 1.609 km; 1.000 km = 0.621 mi: Concurrency terminus
