= Black Butte (Glenn County, California) =

Mountain in California, United States

- Location within California Location within the United States

Highest point
- Elevation: 7,455 ft (2,272 m) NAVD 88
- Prominence: 2,436 ft (742 m)
- Parent peak: Solomon Peak
- Listing: California county high points 27th
- Coordinates: 39°43′36″N 122°52′21″W

Geography
- Location: Glenn County, California, U.S.
- Parent range: Central Northern California Coast Range
- Topo map: USGS Plaskett Meadows

Black Butte is a mountain butte located in the Northern Coast Ranges of California south of Mendocino Pass. It rises to an elevation of 7,455 feet (2,272 m) north of the Black Butte River.

The mountain on the Mendocino National Forest is the highest point in county of Glenn County. In spite of the difference in elevation between the river valley at 2,800 feet (850 m) and Black Butte, the summit's prominence is moderate due to the neighboring 6,500-foot (1,980 m) Plaskett Meadows. The high elevation of the mountain and plateau bring heavy winter snowfall and a low average annual temperature. US Forest Highway 7, a dirt road connection between the eastern and western segments of State Route 162 passes to the north of Black Butte. However, this route is closed in winter due to heavy snowfall.

== See also ==
- List of highest points in California by county
