= Outlet Creek =

River in California, United States

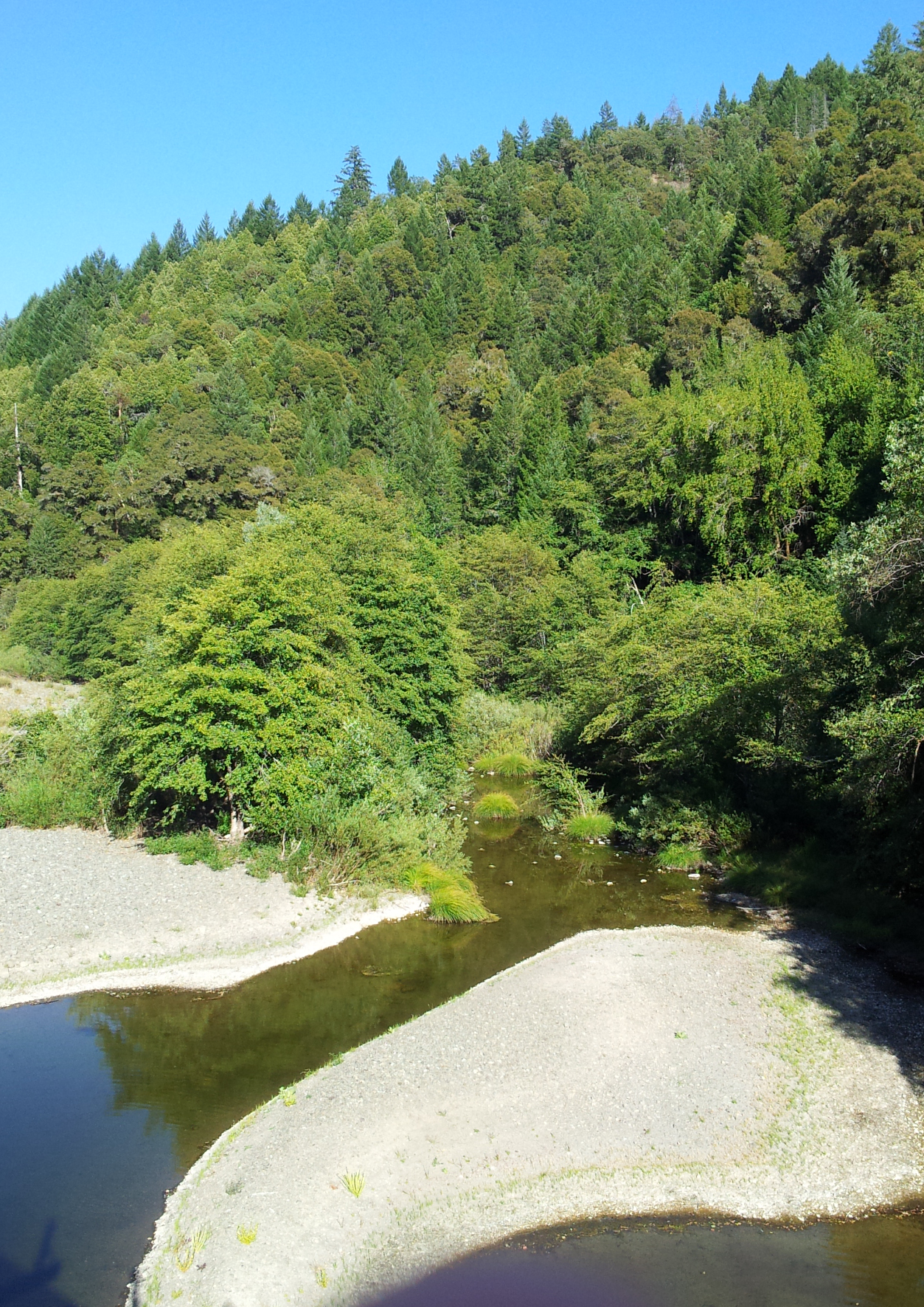
- Outlet Creek at Longvale, California

Location
- Country: United States
- State: California
- Region: Mendocino County

Physical characteristics
- Source
  - location: Willits, California
  - coordinates: 39°27′03″N 123°20′54″W
  - elevation: 1,342 ft (409 m)
- Mouth: Eel River
  - coordinates: 39°37′37″N 123°20′43″W
  - elevation: 1,014 ft (309 m)
- Length: 17 mi (27 km)

Outlet Creek is an Eel River tributary draining the Little Lake Valley northerly through a canyon of the California Coast Ranges. The Northwestern Pacific Railroad bridges the creek twelve times, following it through the canyon. California State Route 162 bridges the creek once, following the canyon closely downstream of Longvale, California, and U.S. Route 101 bridges the creek twice, paralleling it less closely upstream of Longvale. After leaving Quaternary alluvium of the Little Lake Valley, the canyon exposes undivided Cretaceous marine sedimentary and metasedimentary rocks upstream of Longvale and Franciscan Assemblage downstream of Longvale. Outlet Creek provides groundwater recharge, recreation, and agricultural and industrial water supply plus wildlife habitat including cold freshwater habitat for fish migration and spawning.

== See also ==
- List of rivers in California
