= CA-32 =

CA-32 may refer to:

- California's 32nd congressional district
- California State Route 32
- USS New Orleans (CA-32), a World War II heavy cruiser
