= Bidwell Bar Bridge =

Suspension bridge in Oroville, California

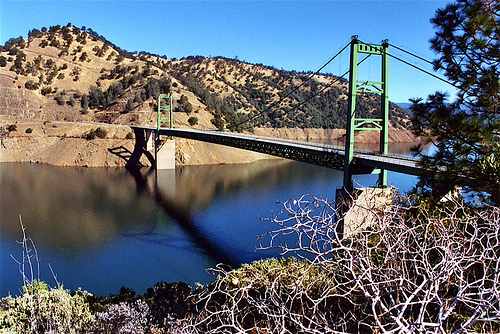
- The new Bidwell Bar Bridge
- Coordinates: 39°32′15″N 121°27′15″W (original); 39°33′00″N 121°25′50″W (current)
- Carries: Pedestrian traffic (original span); two lanes of SR 162 (current span)
- Crosses: Lake Oroville
- Locale: Oroville, California

Characteristics
- Design: 2 suspension bridges
- Total length: 240 feet (73 m) (original span); 1,108 feet (338 m) (current span)

History
- Opened: 1855 (original span); 1965 (current span)

California Historical Landmark
- Reference no.: 314

Location
- Interactive map of Bidwell Bar Bridge

The Bidwell Bar Bridge, in Oroville, California, is the name of two suspension bridges that cross different parts of Lake Oroville. The original Bidwell Bar Bridge was the first steel suspension bridge in California. The $35,000, 240-foot-long (73 m) original was completed in December 1855, and was built of materials transported from Troy, New York, via Cape Horn. Most of the money was put up by Judge Joseph Lewis, a Virginian who moved to Bidwell's Bar in 1849. The bridge originally crossed the Middle Fork Feather River and is the only one of several suspension bridges built in the area in the 1850s that still remains. It remained open to vehicle traffic until 1954.

Construction of the Oroville Dam flooded the canyon where the Feather River ran as well as the town of Bidwell's Bar, and preservationists arranged for the relocation of the bridge in 1966 to the south side of the lake, where it is still open to foot traffic. Its original site is now inundated by the lake.

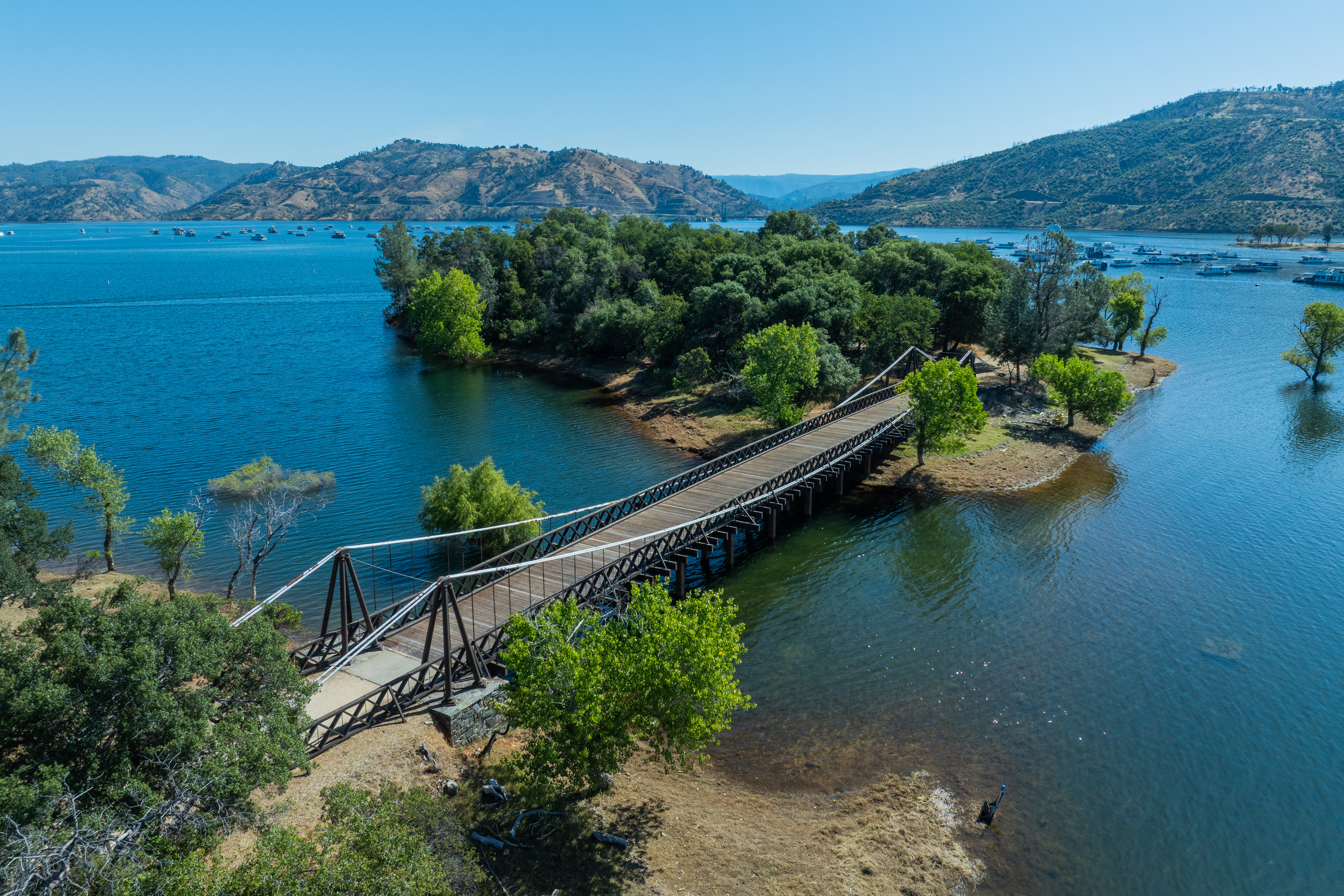
Aerial view of the old bridge (2026)

A replacement bridge was constructed in 1965 and is 1,108 feet (338 m) long. The bridge is built a mile and a half upstream from its original location. At the time, it was one of the highest suspension bridges in the world 627 feet (191 m) above the original streambed, but with the creation of the lake, the bridge now sits just above the water level when the lake is full. The bridge is signed as part of State Route 162.

The original bridge is registered as a California Historical Landmark and it was declared a National Historic Civil Engineering Landmark by the American Society of Civil Engineers. The Mother Orange Tree, the first orange tree in Northern California (purchased by Judge Lewis), is located near the California landmark commemorative plaque.

== See also ==
- List of bridges documented by the Historic American Engineering Record in California
