= California State Route 32 =

Highway in California

State Route 32

- SR 32 highlighted in red

Route information
- Maintained by Caltrans
- Length: 74.387 mi (119.714 km)
- Existed: 1934–present

Major junctions
- West end: I-5 in Orland
- SR 45 at Hamilton City; SR 99 in Chico
- East end: SR 36 / SR 89 near Chester

Location
- Country: United States
- State: California
- Counties: Glenn, Butte, Tehama

Highway system
- State highways in California; Interstate; US; State; Scenic; History; Pre‑1964; Unconstructed; Deleted; Freeways
← SR 29	→ SR 33

State Route 32 (SR 32) is an east–west state highway in the U.S. State of California which is routed from Interstate 5 in Orland, across the Sacramento Valley and through Chico, through the northern Sierra Nevada, and ending at SR 36 and SR 89 in eastern Tehama County.

== Route description ==
Route 32 is defined as follows in section 332 of the California Streets and Highways Code:

Route 32 is from:
(a) Route 5 near Orland to Route 99 near Chico.
(b) Route 99 near Chico to Route 36.

SR 32 begins in Orland at a junction with I-5 as Newville Road. The highway continues east out of Orland for several miles before entering Hamilton City and intersecting SR 45. SR 32 then crosses the Sacramento River into Butte County. East of here, SR 32 enters the city of Chico, becoming Walnut Street before it becomes a one-way couplet as 8th and 9th Streets through downtown Chico. Shortly after the diamond interchange with the SR 99 freeway, 8th and 9th Streets merge into one road and SR 32 continues east out of the Chico city limits.

Following this, SR 32 turns to the northeast, passing through the communities of Forest Ranch and West Branch before crossing into Tehama County and eventually Lassen National Forest. SR 32 terminates at an intersection with SR 89 and SR 36.

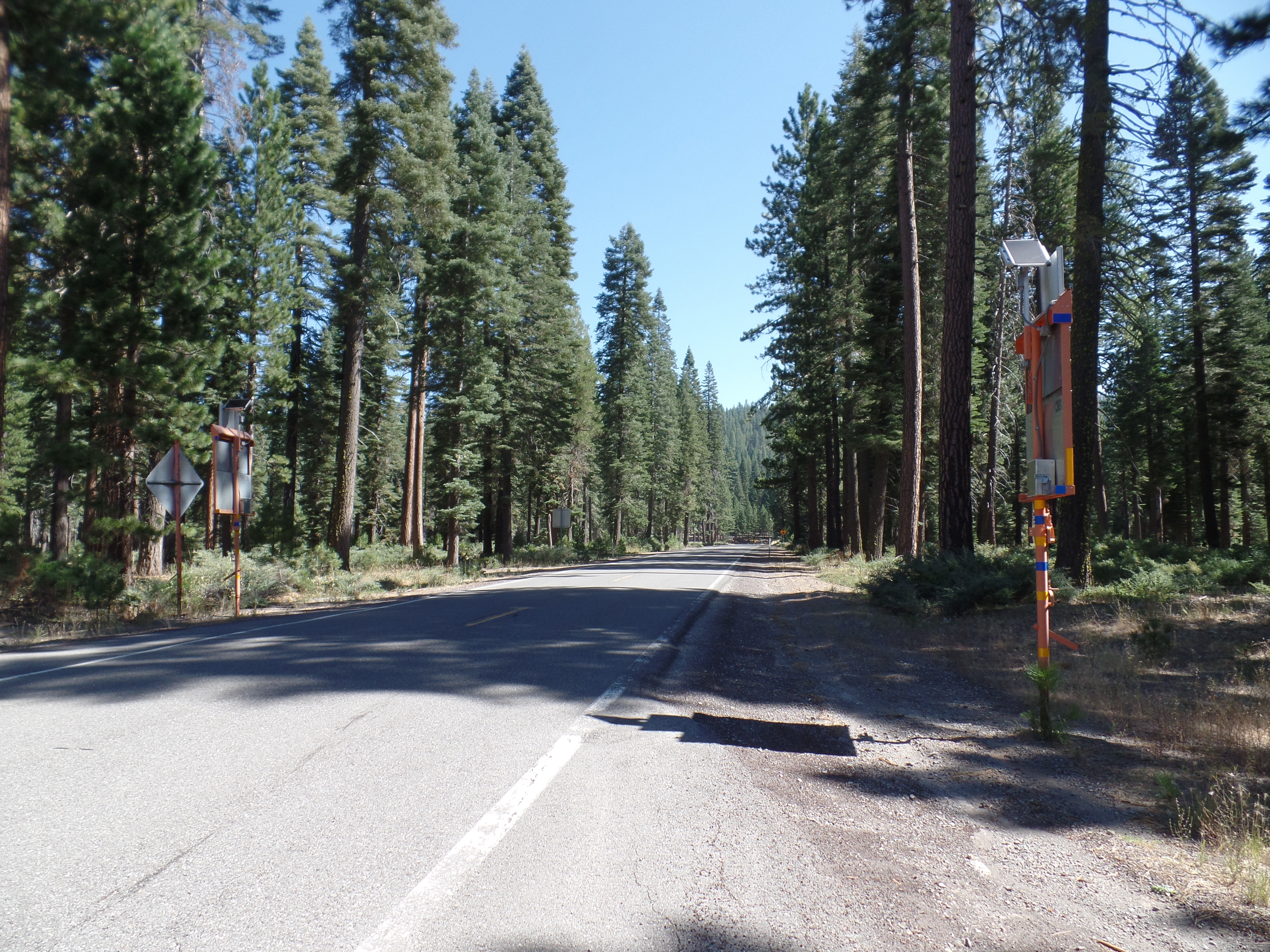
CA 32 eastern end

Different road names include Nord Avenue (Chico), Walnut Street (Chico), West Eighth and Ninth Streets (Chico), East Eighth and Ninth Streets (Chico), Deer Creek Highway (Chico), East and West Sixth Street (Hamilton City), Walker Street (Orland), Newville Road (Orland) and County Road 200.

SR 32 is part of the California Freeway and Expressway System, and between I-5 and SR 99 is part of the National Highway System, a network of highways that are considered essential to the country's economy, defense, and mobility by the Federal Highway Administration.

== Major intersections ==
Except where prefixed with a letter, postmiles were measured on the road as it was in 1964, based on the alignment that existed at the time, and do not necessarily reflect current mileage. Postmile prefixes include: R reflecting a realignment in the route since then, M indicating a second realignment, L referring to an overlap due to a correction or change, and T indicating postmiles classified as temporary. Segments that remain unconstructed or have been relinquished to local control may be omitted. The numbers reset at county lines; the start and end postmiles in each county are given in the county column.

County	Location	Postmile	Destinations	Notes
Glenn; GLE L0.00-10.91	Orland	L0.00	Newville Road (Road 200) – Newville	Continuation beyond I-5
Glenn; GLE L0.00-10.91	Orland	L0.00	I-5 – Redding, Sacramento	Interchange; west end of SR 32; I-5 exit 619
Glenn; GLE L0.00-10.91	Orland	0.00	I-5 BL (6th Street)	Former US 99W
Glenn; GLE L0.00-10.91	Hamilton City	9.63	SR 45 south (Canal Street) / Road 203 – Colusa	
Butte; BUT 0.00-37.75		6.24	North Lindo Avenue, East Avenue to SR 99	
Butte; BUT 0.00-37.75	Chico	9.08	SR 99 Bus. (Main Street) – Downtown Chico	Former US 99E; serves California State University, Chico
Butte; BUT 0.00-37.75	Chico	10.19	SR 99 – Red Bluff, Paradise, Sacramento	Interchange; SR 99 exit 385
Tehama; TEH 0.00-2.71	No major junctions			
Butte; BUT 2.71-4.70	No major junctions			
Tehama; TEH 4.70-R24.88		R24.88	SR 36 / SR 89 – Lassen Park, Chester, Susanville	East end of SR 32
1.000 mi = 1.609 km; 1.000 km = 0.621 mi

== See also ==
- Humboldt Wagon Road
