= Bidwell's Bar, California =

Bidwell's Bar
- Former settlement
- Bidwell's Bar, c. 1854 (artist unknown)

- Location in California Bidwell's Bar (the United States)
- Coordinates: 39°33′24″N 121°26′29″W
- Country: United States
- State: California
- County: Butte County
- Elevation: 902 ft (275 m)

California Historical Landmark
- Reference no.: 330

Bidwell's Bar (also known as Bidwell Bar, and Bidwells Bar) was a gold mining camp in Butte County, California, United States, which lay at the end of the California Trail. It was located 6.5 miles (10.5 km) east-northeast of Oroville, at an elevation of 902 feet (275 m).

== History ==
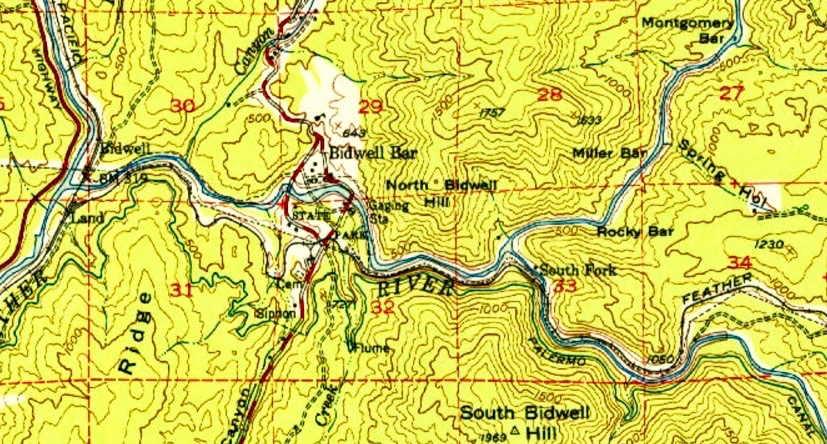
Town in 1948

It was founded by John Bidwell, who discovered gold near the Middle Fork of the Feather River on July 4, 1848. Bidwell carried on a barter trade with local Native Americans, trading foodstuffs for the yellow rock which was of no particular value to the Native Americans. As word of the gold discovery got out, a mining camp arose. By 1853, the camp had attracted enough miners to warrant a post office, and the town's population swelled to 2,000, becoming prominent enough to become the county seat. A fire destroyed much of the town in 1854, but it was quickly rebuilt. By the late 1850s, Bidwell's Bar was served by Whiting's Dog Express, a dog-sled service which used trained canines to deliver mail and supplies to various mining camps.

Living in Bidwell's Bar was rough. Many people lived in tents, and fleas were plentiful. A visitor in the 1850s described the place as a "rag city" and devoid of suitable accommodations. Ferrying people and supplies across the river proved to be difficult, especially during the winter months, and funds were raised to construct the Bidwell Bar Bridge, the first suspension bridge west of the Mississippi River. The first bridge was destroyed in an 1852 flood, but the new bridge was completed in 1856. A post office operated from 1853 to 1900, with a brief closure in 1864 to 1865.

== Decline and depopulation ==
Mining reached its peak in 1856–1857. However, as quickly as the town rose, it went into decline. By the end of 1856, the year the bridge was completed, the gold disappeared and the San Francisco Bulletin called it "Another Deserted Village." Miners were instead going to nearby Ophir (now Oroville). The county seat moved in 1856. Within a year, the population was down to 200, and by 1882, only 30 people remained. The last remnants of the town were submerged with the creation of Lake Oroville in 1968, and only the original bridge and the clock tower (in Butte County Historical Museum) are left. Another survivor of the town is the Mother Orange Tree, the first orange tree in Northern California.

== Status as historic landmark ==
The site was later declared a California Historical Landmark.

== In popular culture ==
- Bidwell's Bar was featured as a location in the computer game Oregon Trail II.
