= Sycamore, California =

Unincorporated community in California, United States

Sycamore
- Unincorporated community
- Location in California Sycamore (the United States)
- Coordinates: 39°08′02″N 121°56′31″W
- Country: United States
- State: California
- County: Colusa
- Elevation: 49 ft (15 m)

Sycamore (formerly, Loch-loch) is a former settlement in Colusa County, California, United States. It lies near the mouth of Sycamore Slough, at an elevation of 49 feet (15 m). Sycamore was a farming community in the late nineteenth century and once had a mill, church, school, and a nearby station on the Northern Electric railway branch to Colusa. The Sycamore post office operated from 1871 to 1960. Today nothing remains at the Sycamore townsite, which is located on California State Route 45 on the south side of its crossing of Sycamore Creek.
