= Mendocino Pass =

Mountain pass in California

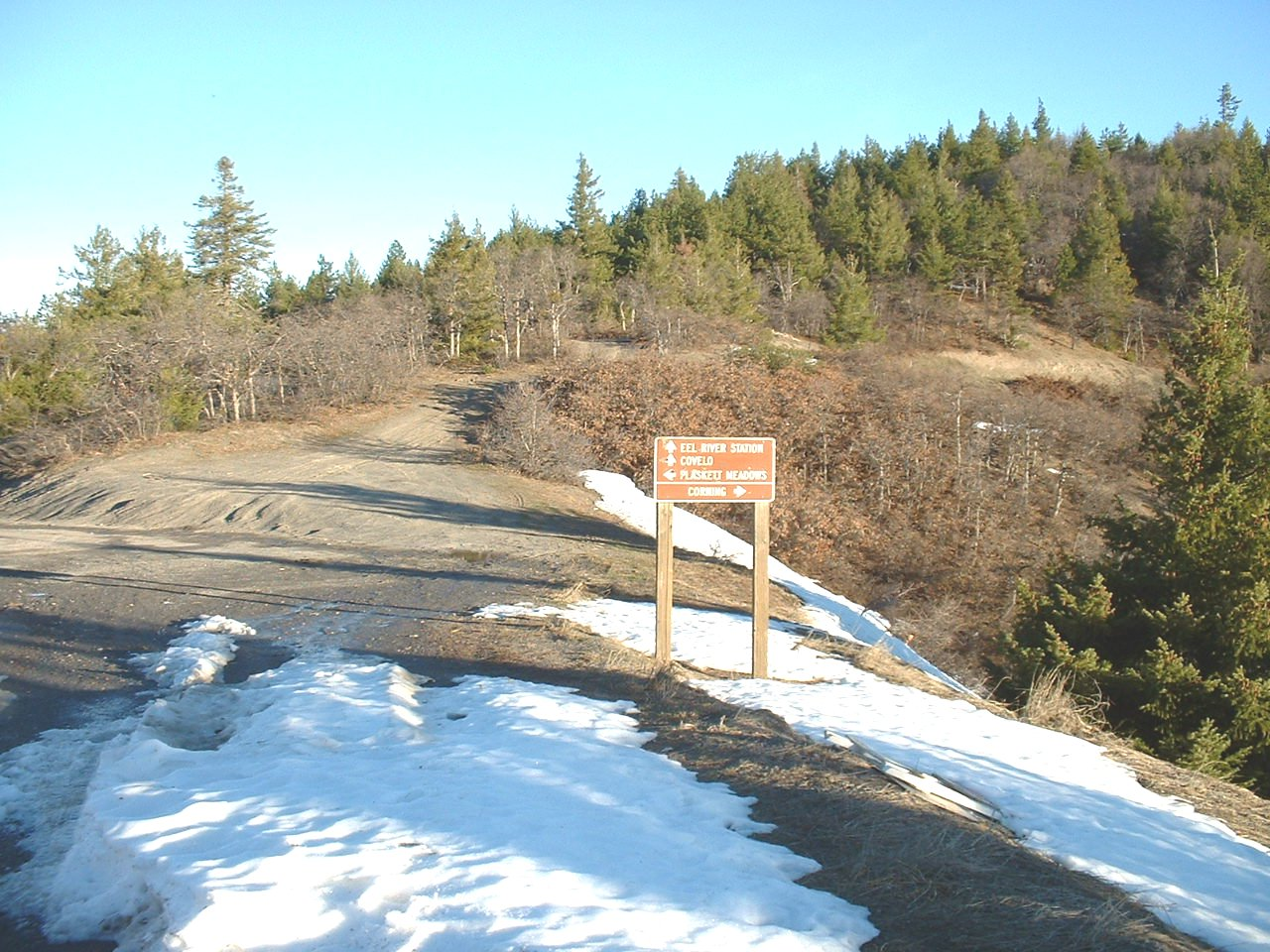

- Location within California
- Elevation: 4,984 feet (1,519 m)
- Traversed by: FH 7 US Forest Highway 7

Third Approach
- Location: Glenn County, California, U.S.
- Range: Northern Coast Ranges
- Coordinates: 39°47′40″N 122°56′06″W
- Topo map: USGS Mendocino Pass

Mendocino Pass is a mountain pass located in the Northern Coast Ranges in California. The pass, in the extreme northwest corner of Glenn County, is at an elevation of about 5,006 feet (1,526 m) and at the gap, two dirt roads intersect. One of them is US Forest Highway 7, a dirt road connecting two disjointed sections of State Route 162. The pass and dirt roads are closed in winter due to heavy snowfall.
