= Palmetto, California =

Unincorporated community in California, United States

Palmetto
- Unincorporated community
- Nickname: Land of the Falling Star
- Location in California Palmetto (the United States)
- Coordinates: 39°49′26″N 121°19′09″W
- Country: United States
- State: California
- County: Plumas County
- Elevation: 5,135 ft (1,565 m)

Palmetto is a former community in Plumas County, California, United States. It lay at an elevation of 5134 feet (1565 m) approximately 27.5 miles (44.3 km) from Quincy along the Oroville–Quincy Highway. A miner cabin and corral were once located there, but were demolished by the 1930s.
