= Brush Creek, California =

Unincorporated community in California, United States

Brush Creek
- Unincorporated community
- Location in California Brush Creek (the United States)
- Coordinates: 39°41′26″N 121°20′21″W
- Country: United States
- State: California
- County: Butte
- Elevation: 3,540 ft (1,079 m)

Brush Creek (formerly, Mountain Cottage and Mountain House) is an unincorporated community near Oroville in Butte County, California, United States. It lies at the eastern end of State Route 162, just beyond the Lake Oroville State Recreation Area, at an elevation of 3,540 feet (1,079 m). A post office operated at Brush Creek from 1856 until 1916, having moved once, in 1902.
