= Knights Landing, California =

Knights Landing
- census-designated place
- Location of Knights Landing in Yolo County, California

- Location in California
- Coordinates: 38°47′59″N 121°43′06″W
- Country: United States
- State: California
- County: Yolo

Area
  - Total: 0.540 sq mi (1.399 km^{2})
  - Land: 0.540 sq mi (1.399 km^{2})
  - Water: 0 sq mi (0 km^{2}) 0%
- Elevation: 36 ft (11 m)

Population (2020)
  - Total: 1,117
  - Density: 2,068/sq mi (798.4/km^{2})
- FIPS code: 06-38800

Knights Landing (formerly Baltimore and East Grafton) is a census-designated place in Yolo County, California, United States, founded by William Knight. It is located on the Sacramento River around 25 miles northwest of Sacramento in the northeastern portion of the county. Knights Landing's ZIP Code is 95645 and its area code 530. It lies at an elevation of 36 feet (11 m). The 2020 census reported that Knights Landing had a population of 1117.

== Geography ==
California State Routes 45 and 113 intersect at Knights Landing. According to the United States Census Bureau, the CDP covers an area of 0.5 square mile (1.4 km^{2}), all land.

=== Climate ===
According to the Köppen climate classification, Knights Landing has a warm-summer Mediterranean climate, Csa on climate maps.

== Demographics ==
Historical population
Census	Pop.	Note	%±
2010	995		—
2020	1,117		12.3%
U.S. Decennial Census; 1850–1870 1880-1890; 1900 1910 1920; 1930 1940 1950; 1960 1970 1980; 1990 2000 2010

Knights Landing first appeared as a census designated place in the 2010 U.S. census.

=== 2020 census ===
As of the 2020 census, Knights Landing had a population of 1,117. The population density was 2,068.5 inhabitants per square mile (798.7/km^{2}). 0.0% of residents lived in urban areas, while 100.0% lived in rural areas.

There were 355 households, and the whole population lived in households. Of all households, 119 (33.5%) had children under the age of 18 living in them, 171 (48.2%) were married-couple households, 26 (7.3%) were cohabiting couple households, 61 (17.2%) had a female householder with no partner present, and 97 (27.3%) had a male householder with no partner present. 89 households (25.1%) were one person, and 37 (10.4%) were one person aged 65 or older. The average household size was 3.15. There were 244 families (68.7% of all households).

The age distribution was 282 people (25.2%) under the age of 18, 100 people (9.0%) aged 18 to 24, 284 people (25.4%) aged 25 to 44, 290 people (26.0%) aged 45 to 64, and 161 people (14.4%) who were 65 years of age or older. The median age was 37.7 years. For every 100 females, there were 97.0 males, and for every 100 females age 18 and over there were 97.9 males age 18 and over.

There were 366 housing units at an average density of 677.8 units per square mile (261.7 units/km^{2}). Of these, 355 (97.0%) were occupied, 212 (59.7%) were owner-occupied, and 143 (40.3%) were occupied by renters. The homeowner vacancy rate was 0.0% and the rental vacancy rate was 0.0%.

Racial composition as of the 2020 census
Race	Number	Percent
White	407	36.4%
Black or African American	11	1.0%
American Indian and Alaska Native	24	2.1%
Asian	14	1.3%
Native Hawaiian and Other Pacific Islander	3	0.3%
Some other race	429	38.4%
Two or more races	229	20.5%
Hispanic or Latino (of any race)	780	69.8%

== History ==
Knights Landing was founded in 1843 by Dr. William Knight, a practicing physician from Baltimore, Maryland. Knight built on a mound that marked the ancient meeting place of Native Americans inhabiting the regions about Cache Creek and the Sacramento River. The site early demonstrated its importance as a steamboat landing and point of communication between the people east and west of the big central river. When the town was laid out in 1849, it was originally called Baltimore, but an agreement over the sale of the new town lots could not be amicably arranged, and the title Baltimore was lost. Knight established a ferry there, which afterwards passed to the ownership of J. W. Snowball. In those days, the ferry tolls were $1 for a man and horse; a team and wagon cost $5. In 1850, S. R. Smith kept a hotel in the settlement and in 1853, Charles F. Reed surveyed and laid out a townsite and was officially given the name of Knight's Landing. That year, J. W. Snowball and J. J. Perkins opened a large general-merchandise store on the Native American mound. On January 1, 1854, Capt. J. H. Updegraff opened his hotel with $10 tickets to a grand New Year's party. A steamer was run from Sacramento for the accommodation of guests. The establishment was called the Yolo House. In 1860, D. N. Hershey and George Glascock erected a brick hotel, which took the place of the Yolo House, that inn being retired to the status of a private residence.

On March 25, 1890, the Knight's Landing branch of the Southern Pacific Railroad was completed and ready for business, and later the completion of the bridge across the river added immensely to the prosperity of the town. The famous and now merged Southern Pacific Railroad Company once had a line from Davis, California, via Woodland, California, through Knights Landing, and the line continued to Marysville, California, via a junction in Yuba City, California. This 1879 map shows the railroad from Woodland almost to East Grafton (which contains Knights Landing): The line now stops a few miles northeast of Woodland.

Grafton Elementary was the only public school in the community. It closed June 23, 2009. The area is served by Woodland Joint Unified School District. In 2010, the Science and Technology Academy of Knights Landing opened on the former Grafton Elementary campus as a charter school.

Knights Landing Cemetery (just south of town on County Road 102) is one of several purported final resting places of stagecoach bandit Charles Bolles, alias Black Bart. If present, the grave is unmarked.
