= Butte City, Glenn County, California =

Unincorporated community in California, United States

Butte City
- Unincorporated community
- Location in California Butte City (the United States)
- Coordinates: 39°27′53″N 121°59′24″W
- Country: United States
- State: California
- County: Glenn
- Elevation: 89 ft (27 m)
- ZIP code: 95920
- Area codes: 530, 837

Butte City (formerly Butte) is an unincorporated community in Glenn County, California, United States. It is located on the east bank of the Sacramento River 11 miles (18 km) south-east of Willows, at an elevation of 89 feet (27 m). Butte City has varied outdoor recreation opportunities including fishing and boating on the Sacramento River (serviced by the Butte City boat ramp) and also duck hunting seasonally. The area surrounding the town is primarily used for agriculture, including rice, walnuts, alfalfa, and corn.

== History ==
The first post office at Butte City was established in 1883. A cemetery is located east of town where historical residents of the area are buried. In earlier times, the town had a restaurant, a store, and a bank, but these businesses have all closed. The town was once a major center for shipping of grain by barge on the Sacramento River, and hog and poultry ranching were also once significant economic activities. Butte City has been the site of a bridge crossing of the Sacramento River since the 1880s; a new bridge carrying California State Route 162 over the river is currently (2023) under construction and will be the fifth bridge at the site.
