= Newville, California =

Unincorporated community in California, United States

Newville
- Unincorporated community
- Location in California Newville (the United States)
- Coordinates: 39°47′28″N 122°31′42″W
- Country: United States
- State: California
- County: Glenn
- Elevation: 620 ft (190 m)

Newville is an unincorporated community in Glenn County, California, United States. It is located 18 miles (29 km) west of Orland, at an elevation of 623 feet (190 m).

A post office operated at Newville from 1868 to 1918.

Newville was settled by J. M. Kendrick in 1854, and at one time had a service station, hotel, and several businesses. Most of the town was destroyed by fire on July 22, 1929. The last of Newville's original buildings was demolished in 1932. By 1936, Newville was being described as a "ghost town", but the name still appears on road signs in the area, and the Newville Cemetery remains active as of 2023.

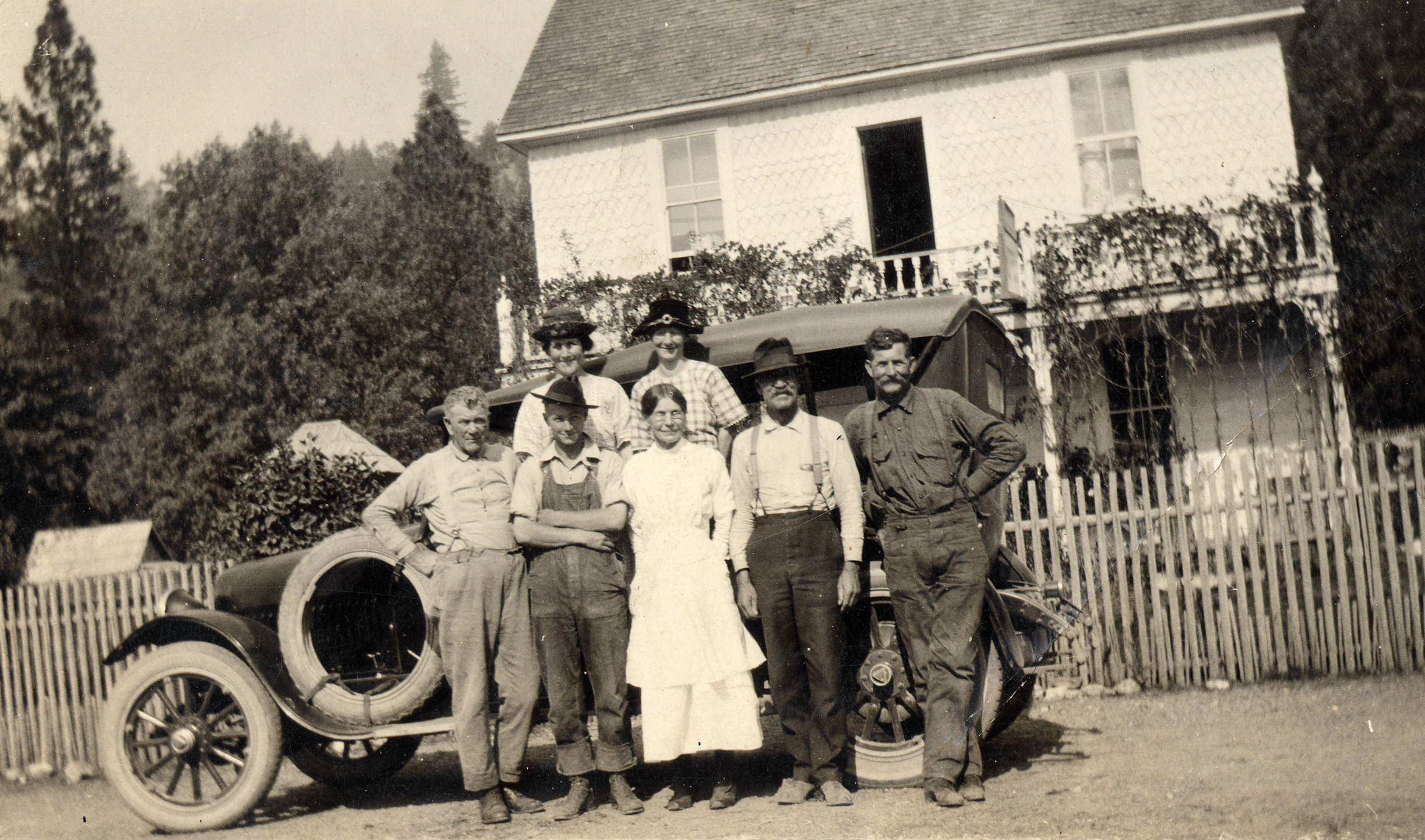
Cobb's Hotel in Newville, 1921
