= Codora, California =

Unincorporated community in California, United States

Codora
- Unincorporated community
- Location in California Codora (the United States)
- Coordinates: 39°27′32″N 122°01′20″W
- Country: United States
- State: California
- County: Glenn
- Elevation: 89 ft (27 m)

Codora is an unincorporated community in Glenn County, California, United States. It was once located on the Southern Pacific Railroad, 10.5 miles (17 km) east-southeast of Willows, at an elevation of 89 feet (27 m).
