= Longvale, California =

Unincorporated community in California, United States

Longvale
- Unincorporated community
- Location in California Longvale (the United States)
- Coordinates: 39°33′19″N 123°25′47″W
- Country: United States
- State: California
- County: Mendocino
- Elevation: 1,191 ft (363 m)

Longvale is an unincorporated community in Mendocino County, California, United States. It is located on Outlet Creek adjacent to the Northwestern Pacific Railroad and U.S. Route 101, 9.5 miles (15 km) south-southeast of Laytonville, at an elevation of 1191 feet (363 m).

A post office operated at Longvale from 1911 to 1958. The post office was located in a store on the original alignment of US 101, across from Camp Piercy, near a bridge to Andersonia. The area was primarily an "auto camp" for tourists driving through the Redwood Empire on US 101.
