= Indian Tom Lake =

Lake in the state of California, United States

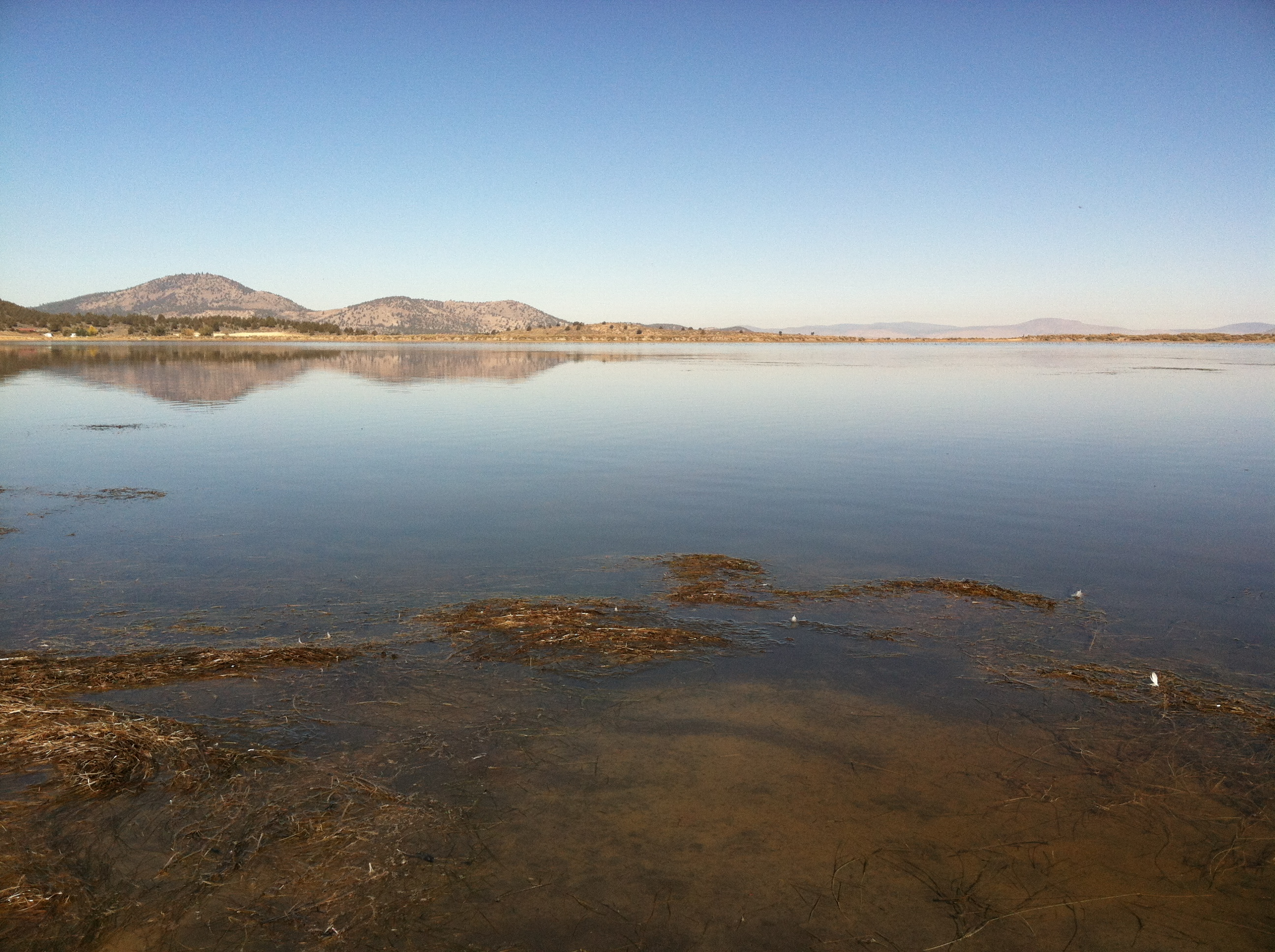
- Indian Tom Lake from the North shore.

- Location within California Location within the United States
- Location: Butte Valley, Eastern Siskiyou County, California
- Coordinates: 41°59′27″N 121°52′45″W
- Lake type: Endorheic Lake
- Primary inflows: Hot creek
- Primary outflows: evaporation, seepage to aquifer
- Basin countries: United States
- Surface area: 500 acres (200 ha)
- Surface elevation: 4,088 feet (1,246 meters),
- Settlements: Dorris and Macdoel

Indian Tom Lake is a 500-acre (2.0 km^{2}), shallow, natural lake located in the western portion of Butte Valley, in eastern Siskiyou County. The lake is a remnant of a larger lake that occupied the entire valley when temperatures were cooler and is fed seasonally by several creeks in Butte Valley. The area around the lake was the home of the Modoc people prior to European contact. Indian Tom Lake is one of California's State Public Hunting Areas for duck and geese.

== Location ==
Indian Tom Lake is inside the northern boundaries of the Butte Valley Wildlife Area managed by the California Department of Fish and Wildlife, along with Meiss Lake which is also a part of the wildlife area. The lake is near California's border with Oregon, and the Lower Klamath National Wildlife Refuge at the junction of Highway 161 and the Dorris-Brownell Road. The location of the lake is fully within the Pacific Flyway.

== Hydrology ==
Indian Tom Lake has no outlet and its waters are not used for irrigation. The lake is shallow and alkaline due to its high salt content and is home to the brine shrimp.

== Fishing ==
Indian Tom Lake is a put-and-take fishery for Lahontan cutthroat trout stocked by the California Department of Fish and Wildlife. Indian Tom Lake has also been stocked with Eagle Lake trout from California's Eagle Lake which has a similar level of alkalinity as Indian Tom Lake, giving the fish its ability to withstand high alkalinity.

Fishing is successful in the spring, when the water is clear and the fish are hungry and vibrant. Because Indian Tom Lake is shallow, it is vulnerable to weed growth in the warmer summer temperatures, making it too late in the fishing season for good catches.

== See also ==
- List of lakes in California
- Archeological Site 4-SK-4
