= Volcanic Legacy Scenic Byway =

Highway in California and Oregon

Volcanic Legacy Scenic Byway

Route information
- Length: 500 mi (800 km)

Lassen Scenic Byway (loop road)
- Major intersections: SR 89 from Old Station, CA to Chester, CA; SR 36 from near Mineral, CA to near Susanville, CA; SR 44 from near Susanville, CA to near Lassen Volcanic National Park, CA

Lake Almanor loop
- Major intersections: SR 89 from Chester, CA to Canyondam, CA; SR 147 from Canyondam, CA to Westwood, CA; SR 36 from Westwood, CA to Chester, CA

Old Station to Crater Lake National Park
- South end: SR 44 / SR 89 in Old Station, CA
- Major intersections: SR 89 from Old Station, CA to Mount Shasta, CA; I-5 from Mount Shasta, CA to Weed, CA; US 97 from Weed, CA to Klamath Falls, OR; OR 140 from Klamath Falls, OR to near Upper Klamath Lake, OR; OR 62 from Fort Klamath, OR to near Crater Lake National Park, OR; OR 138 from Crater Lake National Park to south of Chemult, OR
- North end: US 97 south of Chemult, OR

Medicine Lake Loop
- South end: SR 89 in the Modoc National Forest, CA
- Major intersections: SR 139 from Tulelake, CA to Hatfield, CA; SR 161 from Hatfield, CA to near Dorris, CA
- North end: US 97 near Dorris, CA

Location
- Country: United States
- States: California, Oregon

Highway system
- Scenic Byways; National; National Forest; BLM; NPS
- State highways in California; Interstate; US; State; Scenic; History; Pre‑1964; Unconstructed; Deleted; Freeways
- Oregon Highways; Interstate; US; State; Named; Scenic

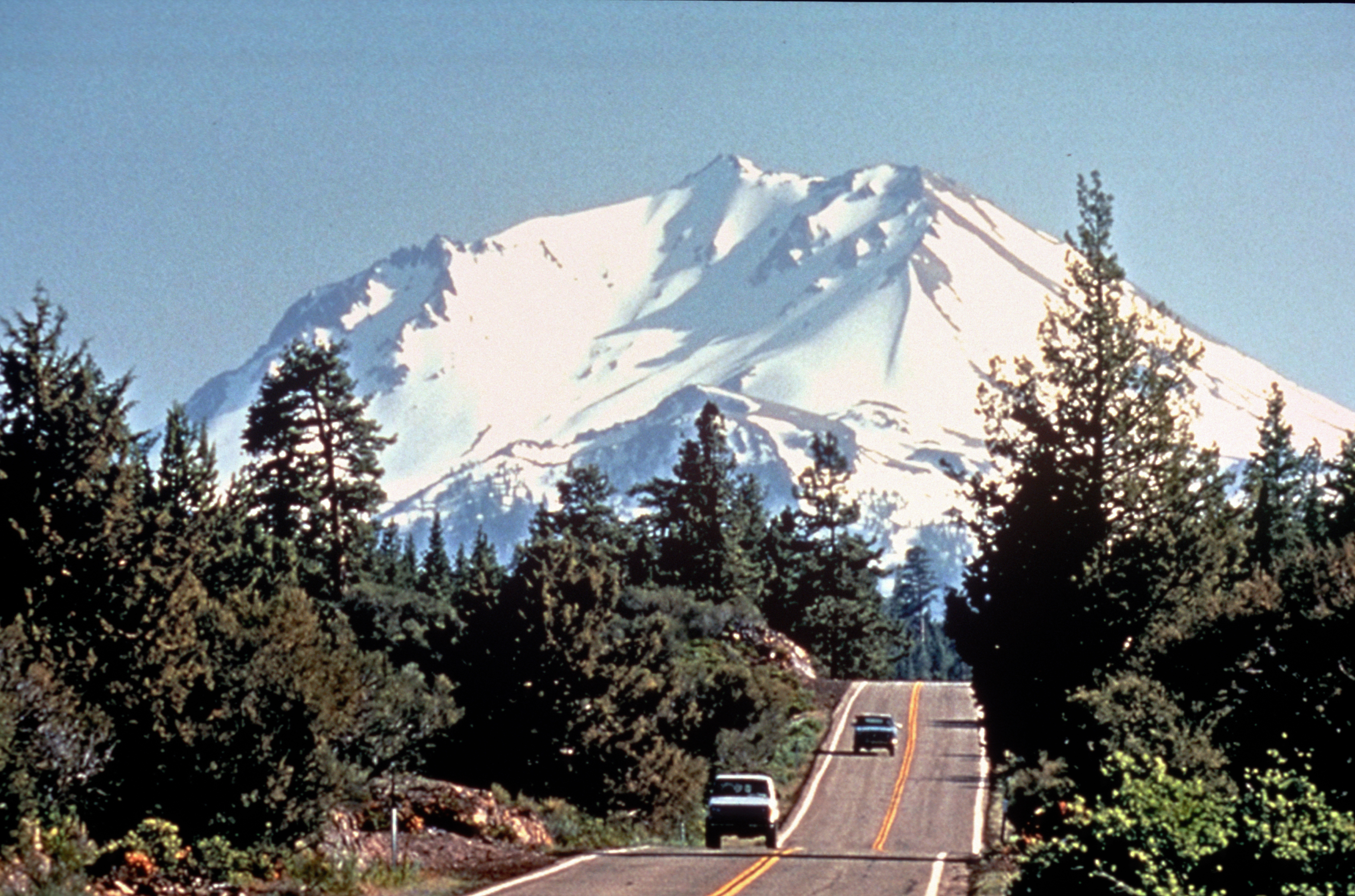
Lassen Peak from the Volcanic Legacy Scenic Byway

The Volcanic Legacy Scenic Byway is a scenic byway and All-American Road in the U.S. states of California and Oregon. It is roughly 500 miles (800 km) long and travels north–south along the Cascade Range past numerous volcanoes. It is composed of two separate National Scenic Byways, the Volcanic Legacy Scenic Byway - Oregon and Volcanic Legacy Scenic Byway - California. The former includes Rim Drive within Crater Lake National Park, while the latter wholly includes the Lassen Scenic Byway within Lassen Volcanic National Park.

== Route description ==
The Volcanic Legacy Scenic Byway is officially divided into 11 regions, with the first four regions forming the Lassen Scenic Byway. There is also an alternate route through Medicine Lake.

=== Region 1: Lassen Volcanic National Park to Chester ===
The bypass begins at the intersection of SR 44 and SR 89 at the northern boundary of Lassen Volcanic National Park. It then runs south along SR 89 through the park, passing by Manzanita Lake and through an unnamed pass between Lassen Peak and Bumpass Mountain. After exiting the park, the bypass and SR 89 join with SR 36 east of Mineral (the segment of SR 36 through Mineral is not officially part of the byway). The highways then head east to Chester on the northwest side of Lake Almanor.

=== Region 2: Loop around Lake Almanor ===
The bypass then runs along the highways looping around Lake Almanor, consisting of: SR 36 running along the north side of the lake between Chester and Westwood, SR 147 on the lake's eastern side between Westwood and Canyondam, and SR 89 from Canyondam back to Chester.

=== Region 3: Chester to Susanville ===
From Chester, SR 36 and the byway continues east to its intersection with SR 44 west of Susanville (the segment of SR 36 between SR 44 and Susanville is not officially part of the byway).

=== Region 4: Susanville to Old Station ===
The bypass then runs along SR 44 to the northwest through the Lassen National Forest until it intersects with SR 89 in Old Station. Southbound SR 44 and SR 89 can then be taken from Old Station back to Lassen Volcanic National Park to complete the Lassen Scenic Byway loop. While it can be traveled either in a clockwise or counterclockwise direction, the segment through Lassen Volcanic National Park is usually closed during the winter.

=== Region 5: Hat Creek to Burney ===
Continuing northwards along SR 89 from Old Station, the byway goes through Hat Creek and then to Burney. Thousand Lakes Wilderness and Burney Mountain are located just west of the byway, while Hat Creek Radio Observatory and the Lassen National Forest are to the east.

=== Region 6: Burney to McCloud ===
Continuing northwards along SR 89 from Burney, the byway goes past McArthur–Burney Falls Memorial State Park, then Lake Britton, then crosses the McCloud River and runs past Bartle before arriving at McCloud.

==== Region 6b: Medicine Lake Loop ====
An alternate route of the byway runs from Bartle in a northeasterly direction for 46 miles (74 km) through the Modoc National Forest, to winding past Medicine Lake before arriving at Lava Beds National Monument (and Region 9 of the byway listed below).

=== Region 7: McCloud to Weed ===
From McCloud, the byway continues west along SR 89 to Mount Shasta City near the mountain of the same name and Lake Siskiyou. The bypass then heads north along Interstate 5 through Black Butte before arriving at Weed.

=== Region 8: Weed to Dorris ===
Continuing northwards along US 97 from Weed, the byway goes past Carrick, then Pluto's Cave, Mount Hebron, Macdoel, Butte Valley National Grassland, and Meiss Lake before arriving at Dorris, just south of the California-Oregon state line.

=== Region 9: Tulelake to Klamath Falls ===
The byway again splits just north of Dorris; there is an alternate route that runs east for 19 miles (31 km) along the California–Oregon state line on SR 161 past Ainsworth Corner and Lower Klamath National Wildlife Refuge to Hatfield. At Hatfield, SR 161 joins SR 139. From here, the byway continues south for 4 miles (6.4 km) to Tulelake. At this point, SR 139 becomes the Lava Beds Highway while the Volcanic Legacy Scenic Byway turns sharply to the east. Five miles (8.0 km) east of this point, the byway then turns runs south for roughly 18 miles (29 km), where it passes through Tule Lake National Wildlife Refuge and Lava Beds National Monument. From Lava Beds National Monument, the byway continues south to Medicine Lake (and Region 6b of the byway listed above).

The mainline of the bypass continues north from Dorris along US 97, crossing into Oregon at the Francis Landrum Historic Wayside. It then passes through Worden (Bear Valley National Wildlife Refuge is located just east of the byway at Worden) and Midland before arriving at Klamath Falls.

=== Region 10: Klamath Falls to Highway 62 ===
At Klamath Falls, the byway turns onto Oregon Route 140 (OR 140) and heads northeast along the eastern side of Upper Klamath Lake for 25 miles (40 km) before turning north onto Westside Road. From there, the byway passes between Pelican Butte (west of the byway) and Upper Klamath National Wildlife Refuge (east of the byway) before arriving at Fort Klamath. At Fort Klamath, the byway joins OR 62 and continues north for 16 miles (26 km), where it turns onto Munson Valley Road towards Crater Lake National Park.

=== Region 11: Crater Lake National Park ===
After entering Crater Lake National Park, the road becomes Rim Drive, a 33-mile (53 km) loop that follows the caldera rim around Crater Lake. At Merriam Point, Rim Drive splits and turns north. The byway continues north for nine miles (14 km), crossing the Pumice Desert before turning east onto OR 138. From this point, the byway continues east for nearly 15-mile (24 km), before finally terminating at US 97 in Chemult.

== Gallery ==
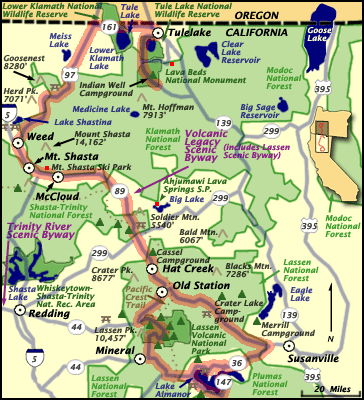
Map of California section

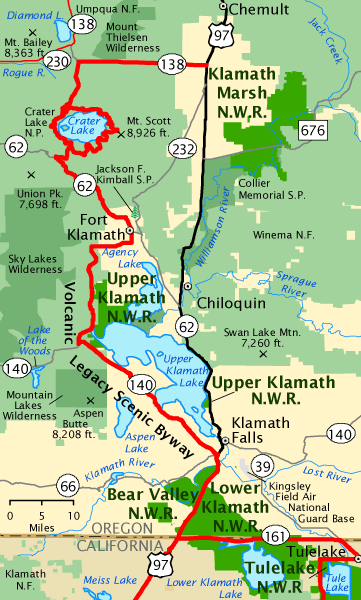
Map of Oregon section

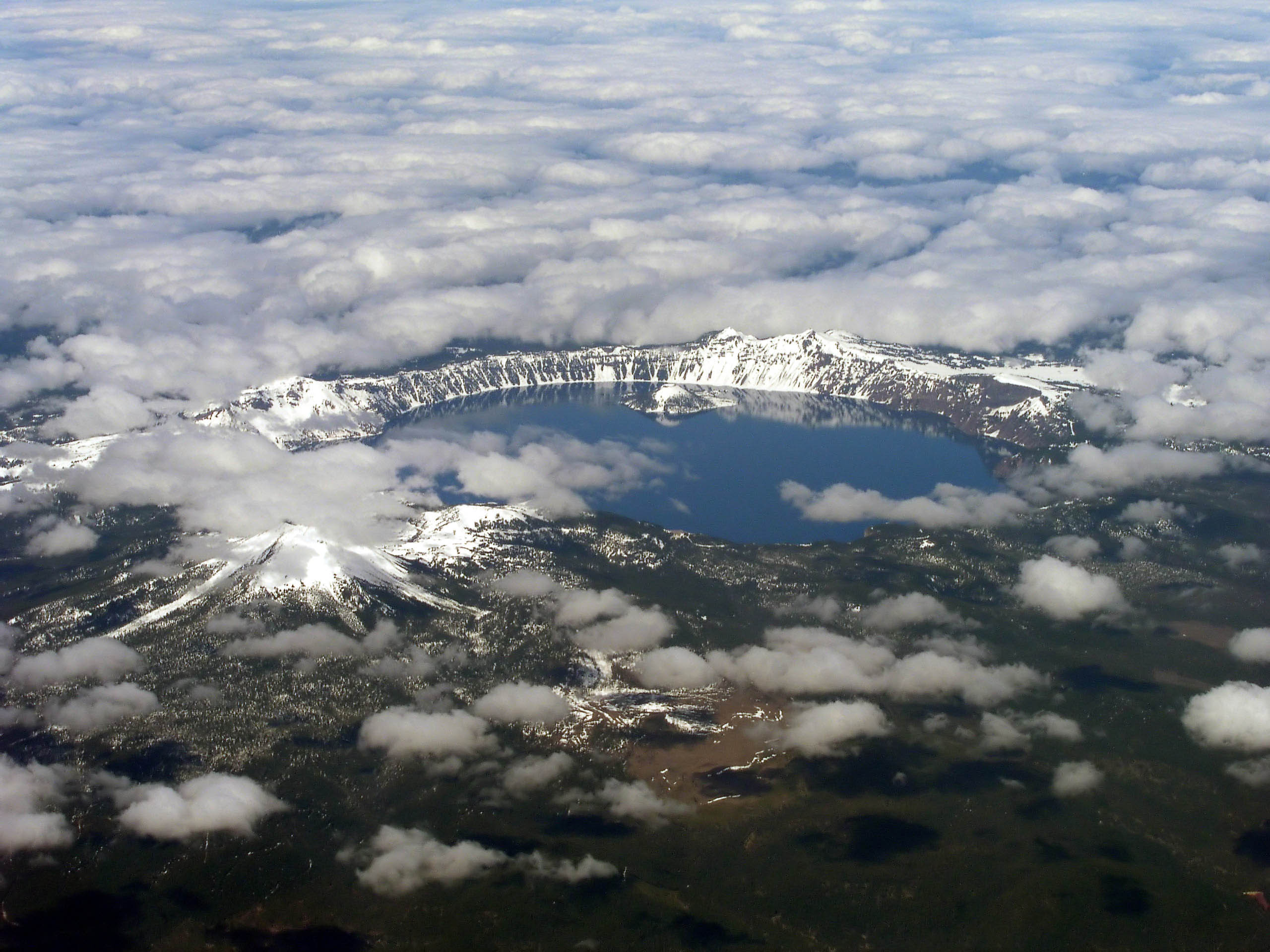
Crater Lake

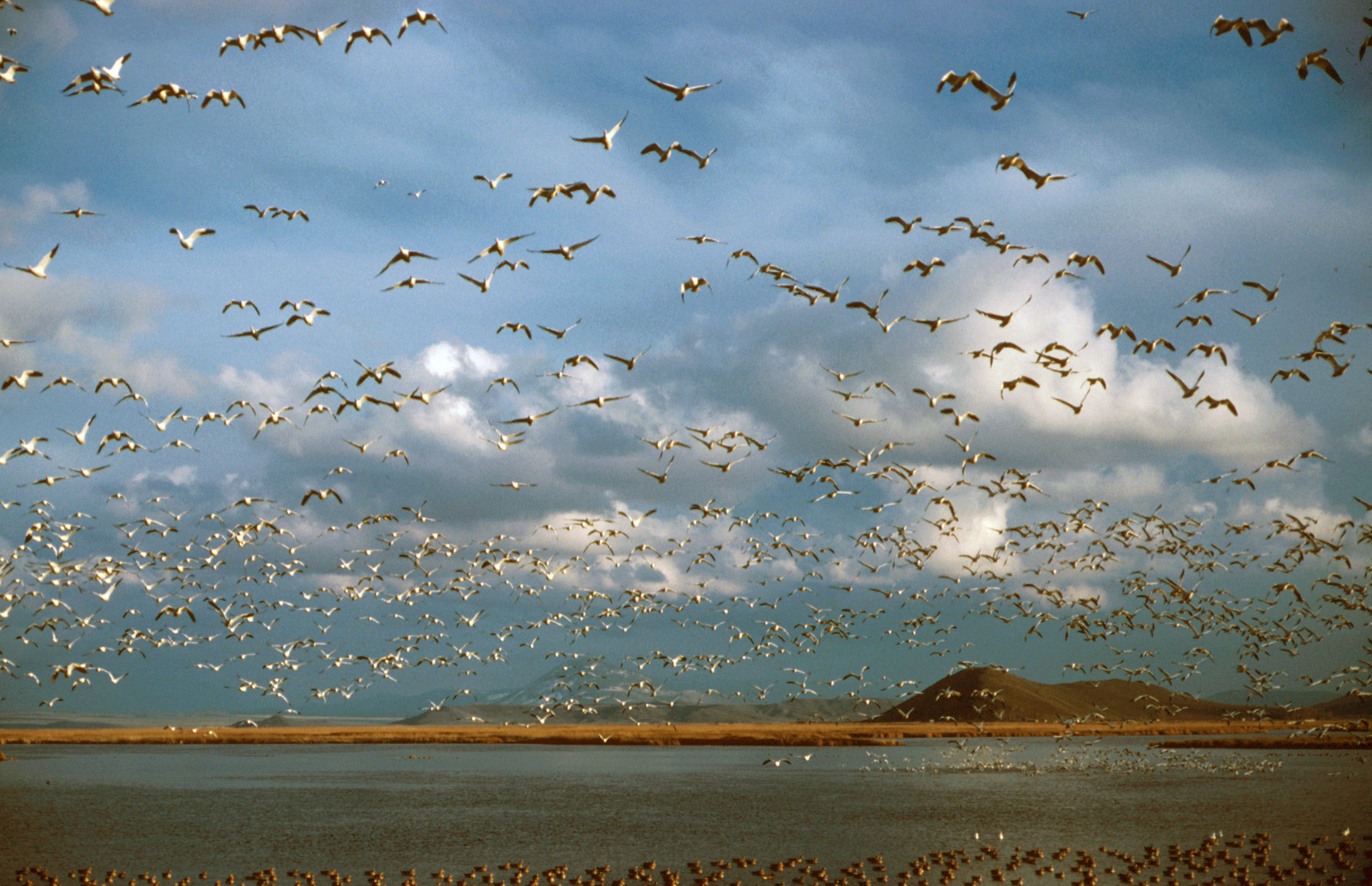
Ross' geese at Lower Klamath National Wildlife Refuge

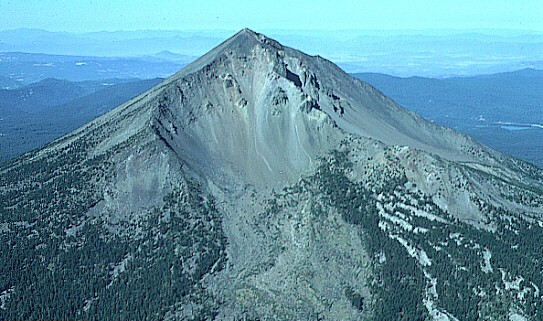
Mount McLoughlin

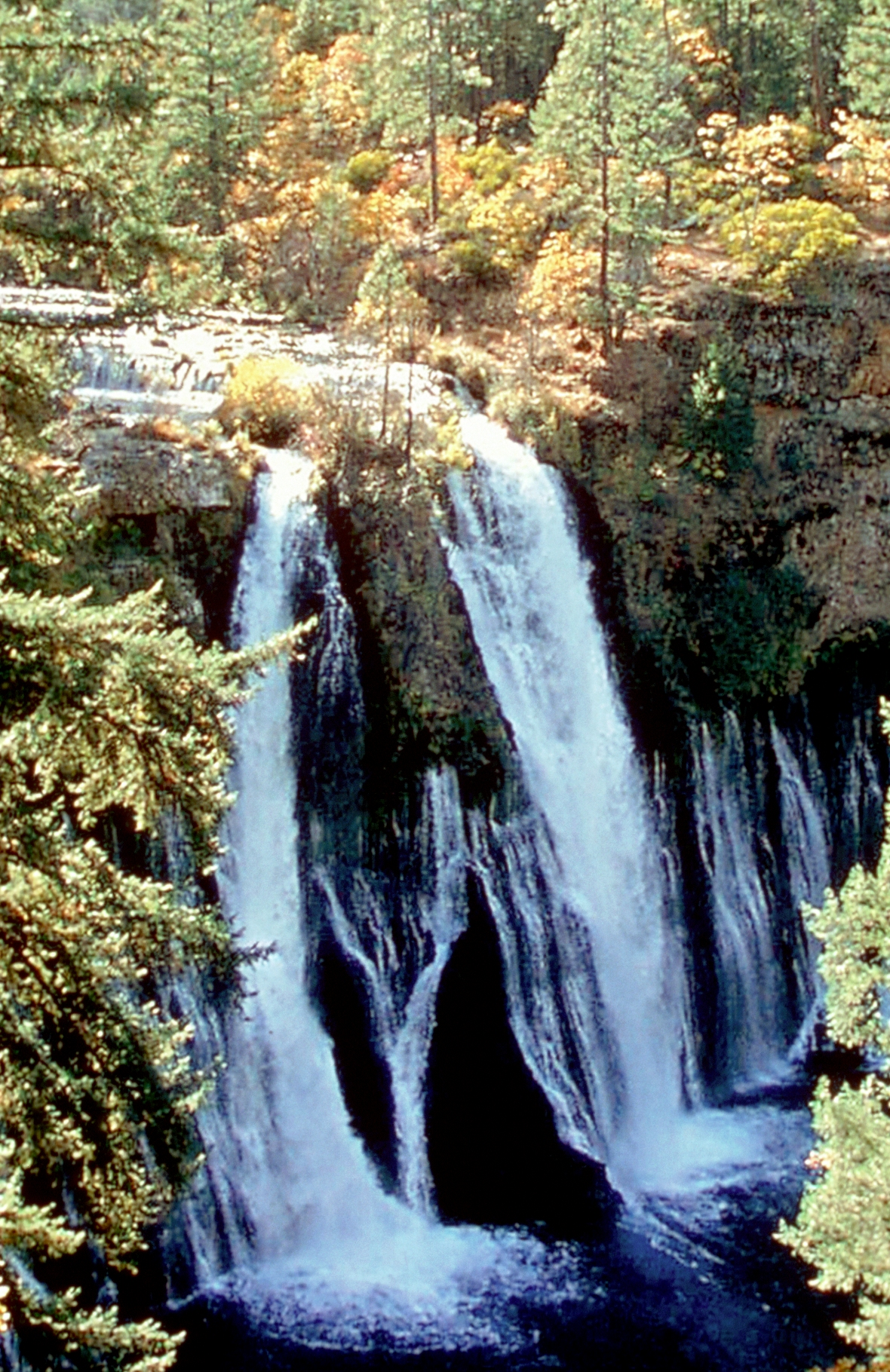
Burney Falls

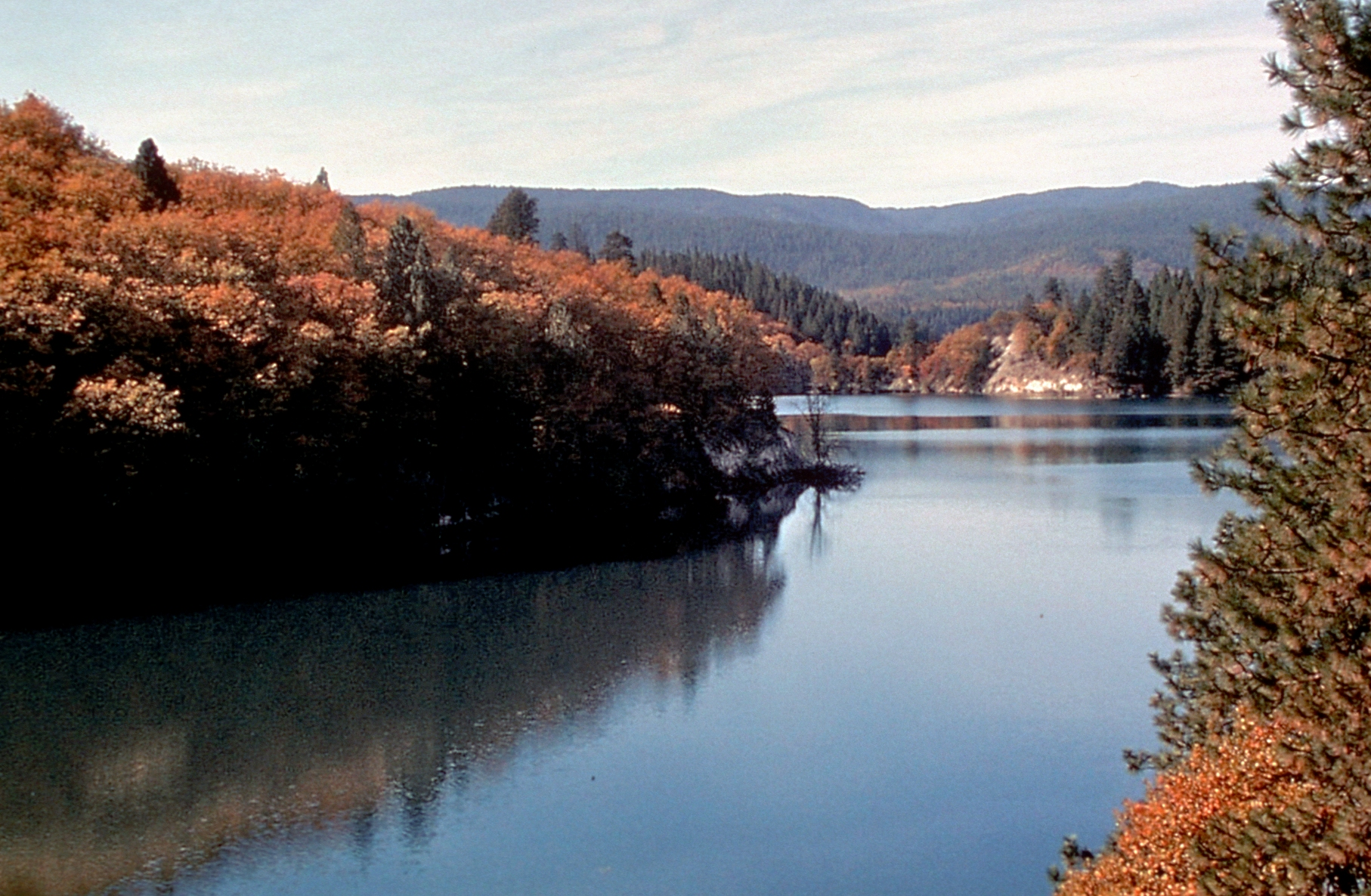
Lake Britton

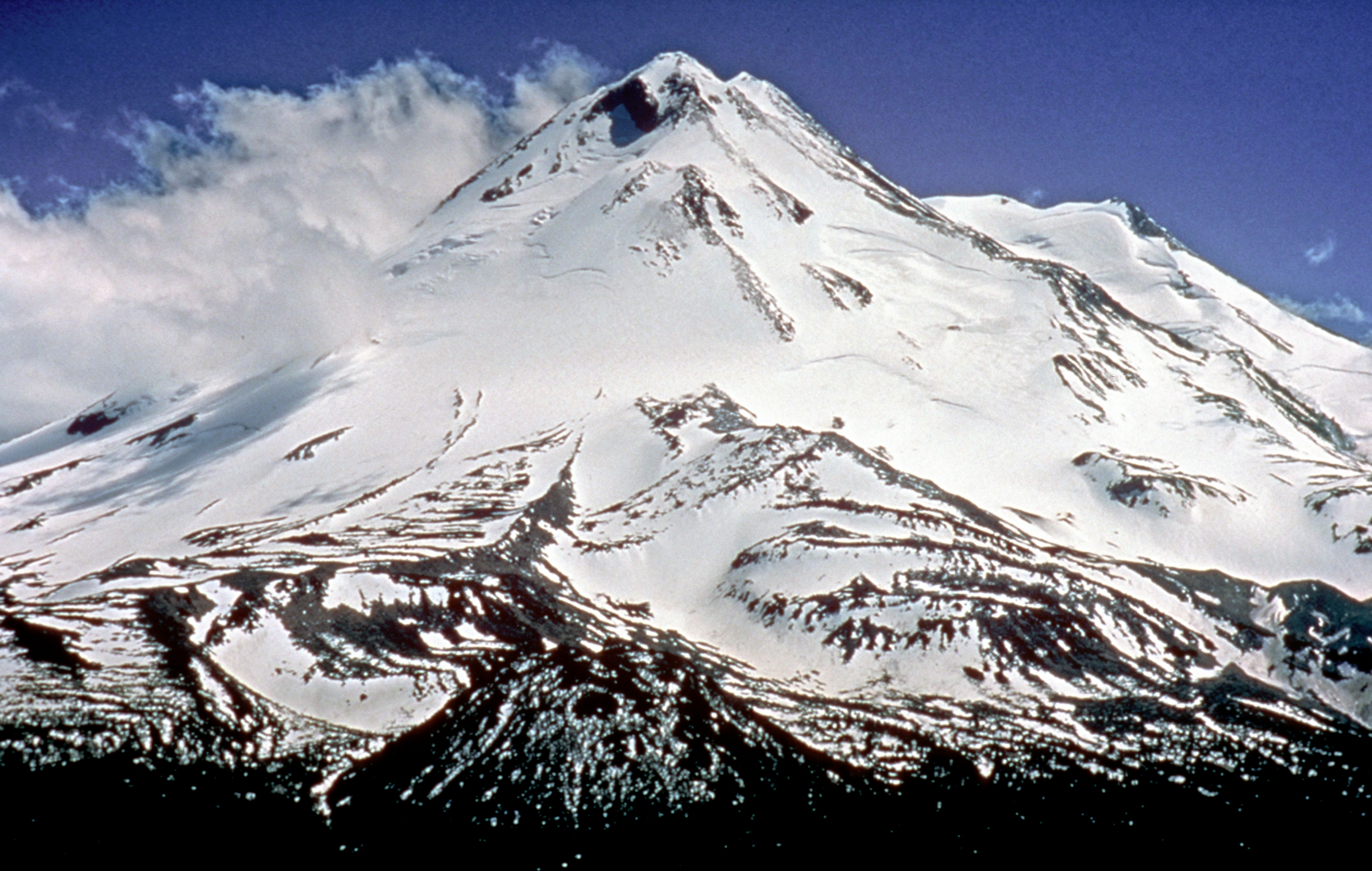
Mount Shasta

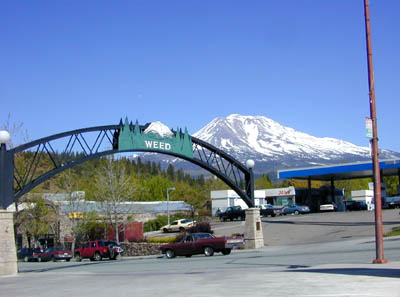
Weed, California

== See also ==
- Tule Lake
- Tule Lake National Monument
