= California State Route 139 =

Highway in California

State Route 139
- SR 139 highlighted in red

Route information
- Maintained by Caltrans
- Length: 143.26 mi (230.55 km)
- History: State highway in ca. 1940 and 1959; numbered by 1946
- Tourist routes: Volcanic Legacy Scenic Byway

Major junctions
- South end: SR 36 in Susanville
- CR A1 near Sheepshead; CR A2 near Scotty Place; SR 299 from Adin to Canby
- North end: SR 161 / OR 39 on the Oregon state line in Hatfield

Location
- Country: United States
- State: California
- Counties: Lassen, Modoc, Siskiyou

Highway system
- State highways in California; Interstate; US; State; Scenic; History; Pre‑1964; Unconstructed; Deleted; Freeways
| ← SR 138 | → SR 140 |

State Route 139 (SR 139) is a state highway in the U.S. state of California. Running from SR 36 in Susanville north to Oregon Route 39 in Hatfield on the Oregon state line, it forms part of the shortest route between Reno, Nevada, and Klamath Falls, Oregon. SR 139 cuts through much of Modoc National Forest and passes near Antelope Mountain and Tule Lake. North of SR 299 near Canby, SR 139 was built by the federal government and turned over to the state in about 1940; the remainder was built by a joint highway district of Lassen and Modoc Counties, completed in 1956, and given to the state in 1959.

== Route description ==
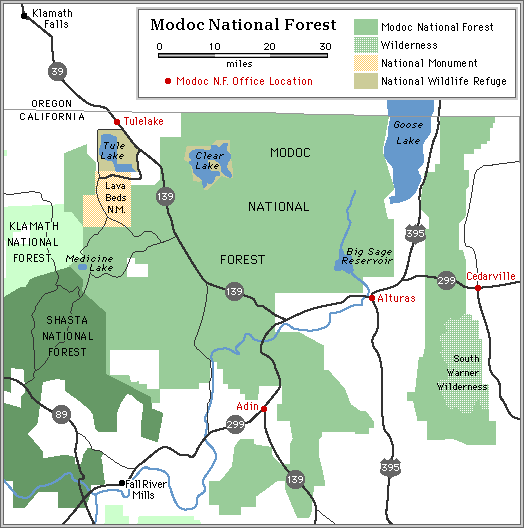
SR 139 through the Modoc National Forest

Route 139 is defined in section 439 of the California Streets and Highways Code. The definition omits the concurrency with Route 299 instead of duplicating that segment in the other route's definition in the code:

Route 139 is from:
(a) Route 36 in Susanville to Route 299 near Adin.
(b) Route 299 near Canby to the Oregon state line near Hatfield.

State Route 139 begins at SR 36 in Susanville, and heads northeast up Antelope Mountain along the eastern edge of Susanville Ranch Park before turning north and descending into the Eagle Lake Basin, passing along the eastern edge of Eagle Lake and later the Said Valley Reservoir. The highway continues north and northwest through valleys and over hills and through a part of the Modoc National Forest, through the community of Avila Place, and then enters the east end of the Big Valley, where it begins to overlap SR 299 through Adin. The combined routes continue northerly through another part of the forest and over Adin Pass into the Warm Springs Valley, where SR 139 splits to the northwest near Canby.

SR 139 runs northwest and north over mostly flat terrain through the center of the national forest before turning northwest. The route continues through Newell before cutting across the intermittent Tule Lake as the Lava Beds Highway through the city of Tulelake. During this segment, SR 139 passes directly through the former Tule Lake Segregation Unit, used to house Japanese-Americans during WWII. After passing through the former internment camp, SR 139 continues to the Oregon state line at Hatfield. At an intersection right on the state line, SR 161 begins to the west, and Oregon Route 39 continues northwest towards Klamath Falls.

The entire route is part of the California Freeway and Expressway System, and north of the SR 299 overlap is part of the National Highway System, a network of highways that are considered essential to the country's economy, defense, and mobility by the Federal Highway Administration. North of SR 299, SR 139 is an eligible State Scenic Highway, but has not been designated as such; the short piece north of Tulelake is however part of the federal Volcanic Legacy Scenic Byway. The portion north of SR 299 is also in the Interregional Road System as a High Emphasis Route.

== History ==
In 1925, a state-created "California Highway Advisory Committee" recommended a number of additions to the state highway system; among these was a route from Susanville to the Oregon state line towards Klamath Falls, via Bieber. This would be part of a road connecting Reno, Nevada and Klamath Falls east of the Sierra Nevada, which would attract heavy traffic and improve access to Crater Lake and Lassen Volcanic National Parks. A local county road already followed this path, but it was an unpaved road, mostly dirt and gravel but with sections of rock and bad sand. This was close to the present SR 139, with notable deviations around the areas of Hayden Hill, Bieber and Lookout, and Malin, Oregon (as Tule Lake covered SR 139's current location).

By the mid-1920s, the main road southeast from Klamath Falls, still unimproved in California, headed southeast to State Highway Route 28 (now SR 299) at Canby rather than south to Bieber. There travelers could head east on Route 28 to Alturas and south on the present US 395 (not a state highway north of Susanville until 1933) towards Reno. The California state legislature passed a law in 1939, providing for state takeover of the Canby-Oregon road if the U.S. Forest Service and Bureau of Public Roads were to construct and pave it. The road was in fact mostly paved by mid-1939, and under construction or completed by mid-1940, when Oregon Route 58 opened, continuing the corridor northwest from Klamath Falls. In 1943 the legislature gave it the Route 210 designation; Oregon had added the short connecting Hatfield Highway to its state highway system in 1937.

Lassen and Modoc Counties organized Joint Highway District No. 14 on December 21, 1929 to construct and maintain a road from Susanville via Adin to Oregon. However, since the state took over the part north of Adin, the district's scope was narrowed to Susanville-Adin. It finally completed work in 1956, and held a ceremony on August 26, in which it placed a monument at a point near Eagle Lake. The legislature added the road to the state highway system as Route 216 in 1959. The portion south of Horse Lake Road became an extension of Route 20 instead; this route from Susanville to Ravendale (later Termo) was never constructed by the state, and was deleted from SR 36 in 1998. Also in 1959, a spur of Route 210 west to Dorris was added; this became SR 161 in 1964.

By 1946, the Canby-Oregon portion had been marked as Sign Route 139, connecting with Oregon Route 39; it was extended south over US 299 to Adin and Routes 216 and 20 to Susanville by 1960. The number was legislatively adopted, replacing Routes 210 and 216, in the 1964 renumbering. It has remained a two-lane road, despite being added to the California Freeway and Expressway System in 1959 (Canby to Oregon) and 1965 (Susanville to Adin).

== Major intersections ==
Except where prefixed with a letter, postmiles were measured on the road as it was in 1964, based on the alignment that existed at the time, and do not necessarily reflect current mileage. Postmile prefixes include: R reflecting a realignment in the route since then, M indicating a second realignment, L referring to an overlap due to a correction or change, and T indicating postmiles classified as temporary. Segments that remain unconstructed or have been relinquished to local control may be omitted. The numbers reset at county lines; the start and end postmiles in each county are given in the county column.

| County | Location | Postmile | Destinations | Notes |
|---|---|---|---|---|
| Lassen; LAS 0.00-66.44 | Susanville | 0.00 | SR 36 (Main Street) – Reno, Red Bluff | South end of SR 139 |
| Lassen; LAS 0.00-66.44 | | 30.82 | CR A1 (Eagle Lake Road) | Northern terminus of CR A1 |
| Lassen; LAS 0.00-66.44 | | 61.46 | CR A2 (Susanville Road) – Bieber, Mount Shasta | Eastern terminus of CR A2 |
| Modoc; MOD 0.00-50.68 | Adin | 0.23 0.33 (Note: Indicates that the postmile represents the distance along SR 299 rather than SR 139.) | SR 299 west – Redding | South end of SR 299 overlap |
| Modoc; MOD 0.00-50.68 | Canby | 21.75 0.23 | SR 299 east – Alturas | North end of SR 299 overlap |
| Modoc; MOD 0.00-50.68 | | 23.20 | Agricultural Inspection Station (southbound only) | |
| Siskiyou; SIS 0.00-5.04 | Hatfield | 5.04 | SR 161 west (State Line Road, Volcanic Legacy Scenic Byway) – Dorris, Malin | |
| Siskiyou; SIS 0.00-5.04 | Hatfield | 5.04 | OR 39 north – Klamath Falls | Continuation into Oregon; north end of SR 139 |
1.000 mi = 1.609 km; 1.000 km = 0.621 mi: Concurrency terminus; Incomplete access
