= Butte Valley =

Butte Valley may refer to:

- Butte Valley, California
- Butte Valley Township, Benson County, North Dakota
- Butte Valley Airport
- Butte Valley National Grassland
