= U.S. Route 97 in California =

Highway in California

U.S. Route 97
- US 97 highlighted in red

Route information
- Maintained by Caltrans
- Length: 54 mi (87 km)
- Existed: 1935–present
- Tourist routes: Volcanic Legacy Scenic Byway

Major junctions
- South end: I-5 in Weed
- SR 161 near Hatfield
- North end: US 97 at Oregon state line towards Klamath Falls, OR

Location
- Country: United States
- State: California
- Counties: Siskiyou

Highway system
- United States Numbered Highway System; List; Special; Divided; State highways in California; Interstate; US; State; Scenic; History; Pre‑1964; Unconstructed; Deleted; Freeways
← SR 96	→ SR 98

U.S. Route 97 (US 97) is a United States Numbered Highway, stretching from Weed, California to the Canadian border in Oroville, Washington. The California portion of US 97 runs north from I-5 in Weed to the Oregon state line. This is the majority of a shortcut between I-5 and Klamath Falls, Oregon, added to both states' state highway systems in 1931. It was designated US 97 in 1935, replacing an east–west section in southern Oregon.

== Route description ==
The entire length of US 97 in California is defined in section 397 of the California Streets and Highways Code as simply Route 97, and that the highway is from "Route 5 in Weed to the Oregon state line near Dorris". This corresponds with the American Association of State Highway and Transportation Officials (AASHTO)'s U.S. Route logs of US 97.

US 97 begins in Weed at an interchange with Interstate 5. It runs on Weed's Business Loop of Interstate 5, which all of the loop used to be U.S. Route 99. At the junction with California State Route 265, U.S. Route 97 ends its concurrency with the Business Loop. It turns right, heading northeast into the Shasta-Trinity National Forest, and later the Klamath National Forest. US 97 passes by Grass Lake as it travels through the mountains before descending into the community of Macdoel. The route continues into the city of Dorris before intersecting with California State Route 161 near Indian Tom Lake before it crosses the Oregon state border and leaves California.

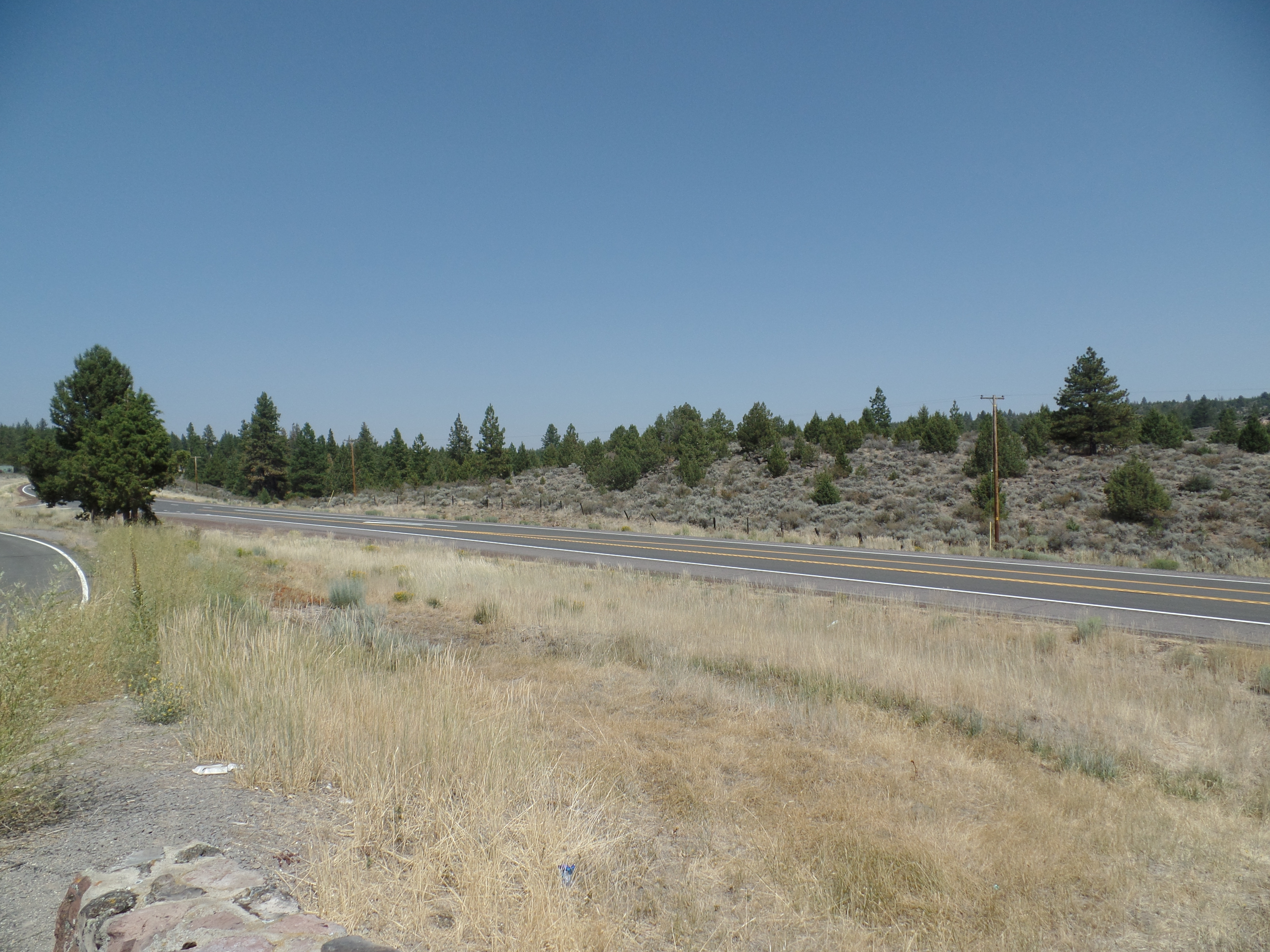
View of US 97 from the viewpoint near Mount Shasta.

US 97 is part of the California Freeway and Expressway System, and is part of the National Highway System, a network of highways that are considered essential to the country's economy, defense, and mobility by the Federal Highway Administration. US 97 is eligible for the State Scenic Highway System, but it is not officially designated as a scenic highway by the California Department of Transportation. US 97 is also part of the Volcanic Legacy Scenic Byway, an All-American Road.

== History ==
US 97 was created in 1926 and originally terminated near Ashland, Oregon, but was extended from Klamath Falls to Weed in 1935.

In 2002, Caltrans allocated $23.7 million to construct a 2.6-mile (4.2 km) bypass of Dorris to carry US 97 traffic, replacing a set of city streets with three turns that caused tractor trailers to flip over. The proposal was rejected by the city government in 2003 due to fears it would affect business traffic, which had already been struggling in Dorris.

== Major intersections ==
Except where prefixed with a letter, postmiles were measured on the road as it was in 1964, based on the alignment that existed at the time, and do not necessarily reflect current mileage. R reflects a realignment in the route since then, M indicates a second realignment, L refers to an overlap due to a correction or change, and T indicates postmiles classified as temporary. Segments that remain unconstructed or have been relinquished to local control may be omitted. The entire route is in Siskiyou County.

Location	Postmile	Destinations	Notes
Weed	L0.00	I-5 BL south (South Weed Boulevard)	South end of I-5 BL overlap; continuation beyond I-5
Weed	L0.00	I-5 / College Avenue – Redding, Portland, College of the Siskiyous	Interchange; southern terminus of US 97; south end of Hist. US 99 overlap; former US 99 south; I-5 exit 747
Weed	L0.00	Historic US 99 begins	Interchange; southern terminus of US 97; south end of Hist. US 99 overlap; former US 99 south; I-5 exit 747
Weed	L0.43 0.05	I-5 BL north / Historic US 99 north (SR 265 / North Weed Boulevard) to I-5 north – Yreka, Portland	North end of I-5 BL / Hist. US 99 overlap; southern terminus of SR 265; former US 99 north
	R12.13	CR A12 west (99-97 Cutoff) – Grenada, Yreka	Eastern terminus of CR A12
	21.80	Grass Lake Rest Area	
	49.90	Agricultural Inspection Station (southbound only)	
	53.81	SR 161 east – Tulelake	Western terminus of SR 161
	54.09	US 97 north – Klamath Falls, Bend	Continuation into Oregon
1.000 mi = 1.609 km; 1.000 km = 0.621 mi: Concurrency terminus

== See also ==
U.S. Route 97
Previous state: Terminus	California	Next state: Oregon
