= California State Route 161 =

State highway in Siskiyou County, California, United States

State Route 161
- SR 161 highlighted in red

Route information
- Maintained by Caltrans
- Length: 19.36 mi (31.16 km)
- Tourist routes: Volcanic Legacy Scenic Byway

Major junctions
- West end: US 97 northeast of Dorris
- East end: SR 139 in Hatfield

Location
- Country: United States
- State: California
- Counties: Siskiyou

Highway system
- State highways in California; Interstate; US; State; Scenic; History; Pre‑1964; Unconstructed; Deleted; Freeways
← SR 160	→ SR 162

State Route 161 (SR 161) is a 19.36-mile (31.16 km) state highway in Siskiyou County, California, United States, that runs along the California–Oregon state line between U.S. Route 97 (US 97) northeast of Dorris and California State Route 139 (SR 139) in Hatfield. SR 161 is part of the Medicine Lake Loop section of the Volcanic Legacy Scenic Byway.

== Route description ==
Eastbound SR 161, as it passes through the Lower Klamath National Wildlife Refuge, July 2012

Route 161 is defined in section 461 of the California Streets and Highways Code, and that the highway is "from Route 97 near Dorris to Route 139 near Hatfield".

SR 161's western terminus is at a T intersection with US 97, northeast of Dorris and just south of the border with Oregon. SR 161 then travels east past Indian Tom Lake, bending to the south and passing by Lake Miller and Sheepy Lake. The highway then continues past the Lower Klamath National Wildlife Refuge and near the northern edge of Lower Klamath Lake. It then resumes paralleling the state line again, with some stretches actually running directly along the border and segments of the westbound lane inside Oregon's territory. SR 161 then ends at SR 139 in Hatfield, immediately south of the state line where SR 139 crosses the border and becomes Oregon Route 39.

SR 161 is not part of the National Highway System, a network of highways that are considered essential to the country's economy, defense, and mobility by the Federal Highway Administration. SR 161 is eligible for the State Scenic Highway System, but it is not officially designated as a scenic highway by the California Department of Transportation.

SR 161 is part of a spur route of the Volcanic Legacy Scenic Byway, an All-American Road, that heads towards Tule Lake and Lava Beds National Monument.

== Major intersections ==
Except where prefixed with a letter, postmiles were measured on the road as it was in 1964, based on the alignment that existed at the time, and do not necessarily reflect current mileage. Postmile prefixes include: R reflecting a realignment in the route since then, M indicating a second realignment, L referring to an overlap due to a correction or change, and T indicating postmiles classified as temporary. Segments that remain unconstructed or have been relinquished to local control may be omitted. The entire route is in Siskiyou County.

Location	Postmile	Destinations	Notes
	0.37	US 97 – Dorris, Weed, Klamath Falls	Western end of SR 161
Hatfield	19.36	SR 139 – Tulelake, Klamath Falls	Eastern end of SR 161; connects to Oregon Route 39
Hatfield	19.36	State Line Road east	Continuation beyond SR 139
1.000 mi = 1.609 km; 1.000 km = 0.621 mi

== See also ==
- List of state highways in California
