= Fox Mountain (California) =

Mountain in California, United States

- Location within California

Highest point
- Elevation: 1,944 m (6,378 ft)
- Prominence: 364 m (1,194 ft)
- Coordinates: 41°15′58.24″N 121°2′11.23″W

Geography
- Location: Modoc County, California, US
- Parent range: Modoc-Lassen Plateau
- Topo map: USGS Halls Canyon

Fox Mountain is a mountain located in the Modoc-Lassen Plateau of southwest Modoc County, California, which stands at 1,944 m (6,378 ft). It is around 11.1 km (6.9 mi) northwest of Adin, California.

Slightly northwest of the mountain, there is an old fire lookout tower accessible via dirt road.
