= Meiss =

Meiss may refer to:

- Meiss al-Jabal, Lebanon
- Meiss Lake, in California
