= Termo =

Termo may refer to:

- Anita samson
- Termo, California, USA
- Leonard Termo (?–2012), American character actor
