= Oregon Highway 50 =

Oregon Highway 50 may refer to:

- For the former OR 50, see Oregon Route 50.
- For the unsigned Highway 50, see Klamath Falls-Malin Highway.
- For the former unsigned Highway 50, see Klamath Falls-Weed Highway.
