= Stone Bridge (Merrill, Oregon) =

The Stone Bridge
- Carries: Applegate Trail (historical)
- Locale: Merrill, Oregon

The Stone Bridge is a historical marker, erected by the Daughters of the American Revolution (DAR), it commemorates a natural basalt ledge across the Lost River that served as a critical crossing for pioneers and was a central location at the onset of the Modoc War.

== Inscription ==
"On July Sixth 1846 fifteen pioneers who located the South Road from Fort Hale to the Willamette Valley crossed Lost River on the ledge underlying this dam. In their memory this marker is placed by Eulalona Chapter Daughters of the American Revolution."

== Location ==
The marker is situated on the west side of Malone Road, approximately a quarter-mile south of the town of Merrill, Oregon, and roughly one mile north of the California Border. The bridge sits adjacent to the Anderson-Rose Dam, which was constructed directly over the original natural bridge. The site is featured on the Modoc War self guided audio tour. There is additional signage for the Applegate Trail.

== History ==
The stone bridge was historically a campsite for the Modoc tribe discovered by the Applegate pioneer family and served as a critical crossing point at the Lost River on the Applegate Trail.

At the time of its discover, the bridge provided stable, flat surfaces for pioneer wagons to cross the Lost River. During its discovery the water level flowed over the bridge at about a depth of 18 inches. During the time of the Modoc War however; the bridge was not in use due to the rising water levels.
