= O39 =

O39 may refer to:

- Ravendale Airport FAA LID, an airport in California
- O-39, one of the designations of the Curtiss Falcon aircraft
- OCBC Bank, based on its stock-trading code
