= California State Route 265 =

Highway in California

State Route 265
- Weed Boulevard; Part of I-5 BL
- SR 265 highlighted in red

Route information
- Maintained by Caltrans
- Length: 0.527 mi (848 m)

Major junctions
- South end: US 97 in Weed
- North end: I-5 in Weed

Location
- Country: United States
- State: California
- Counties: Siskiyou

Highway system
- State highways in California; Interstate; US; State; Scenic; History; Pre‑1964; Unconstructed; Deleted; Freeways
← SR 263	→ SR 266

State Route 265 (SR 265) is a state highway in the U.S. state of California that is part of both Business Loop 5 and Weed Boulevard in the City of Weed in Siskiyou County. SR 265 runs from U.S. Route 97 to Interstate 5.

== Route description ==
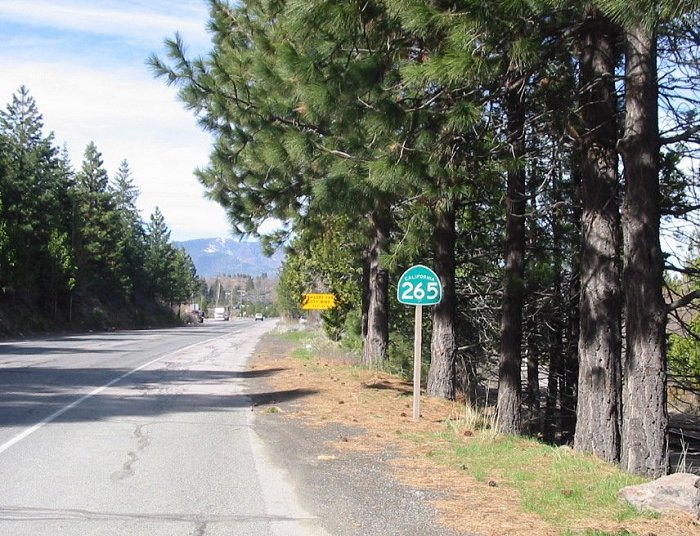
SR 265 shield

Route 265 is defined in section 565 of the California Streets and Highways Code, and that the highway is "from Route 97 in Weed northwesterly to Route 5 at North Weed Interchange".

SR 265 spurs out of U.S. Route 97 in Weed while carrying Business Loop 5 from that intersection to Interstate 5. It was once part of U.S. Route 99. For many years the route was hidden, but was signed in 2005 in anticipation of a complete redesign - reconstruction of Weed Boulevard. Previously, the only visual proof of the route was the bridge ID that was spraypainted on the base of the Interstate 5 overpass, i.e. "265 overcrossing".

SR 265 is not part of the National Highway System, a network of highways that are considered essential to the country's economy, defense, and mobility by the Federal Highway Administration.

== Major intersections ==
Except where prefixed with a letter, postmiles were measured on the road as it was in 1964, based on the alignment of U.S. Route 99 as it existed at that time, and do not necessarily reflect current mileage. Postmile prefixes include: R reflecting a realignment in the route since then, M indicating a second realignment, L referring to an overlap due to a correction or change, and T indicating postmiles classified as temporary. Segments that remain unconstructed or have been relinquished to local control may be omitted. The entire route is in Weed, Siskiyou County.

Postmile	Destinations	Notes
19.80	US 97 / I-5 BL south / Historic US 99 south (North Weed Boulevard) – Klamath Falls	Southern terminus of SR 265; south end of I-5 BL/Hist. US 99 overlap; former US 99 south
20.33	I-5 – Portland, Redding	Interchange; northern terminus of SR 265/I-5 BL/Hist. US 99; north end of I-5 BL/Hist. US 99 overlap; I-5 exit 748; road continues as Chaparral Drive
1.000 mi = 1.609 km; 1.000 km = 0.621 mi: Concurrency terminus

== See also ==
- Business routes of Interstate 5
