= Meiss Lake =

Lake in the state of California, United States

- Location within California Location within the United States
- Location: Butte Valley, Eastern Siskiyou County, California
- Coordinates: 41°51′37″N 122°03′29″W
- Type: Endorheic Lake
- Primary inflows: Prather Creek, Ikes Creek, Musgrave Creek, Butte Creek (historically)
- Primary outflows: evaporation, seepage to aquifer
- Basin countries: United States
- Surface area: 3,000 acres (1,200 ha)
- Surface elevation: 4,236 feet (1,291 meters),
- Settlements: near Dorris, Macdoel

Meiss Lake is a 3,000-acre (12 km^{2}), shallow, warm lake located in the western portion of Butte Valley, in eastern Siskiyou County. The lake is a remnant of a larger lake that occupied the entire valley when temperatures were cooler and is fed seasonally by several creeks in Butte Valley. Although Meiss Lake is in the closed Butte Creek Valley basin, in wetter times it undoubtedly flowed over a low divide into Rock Creek and then into the Klamath River east of Copco Lake. A pumping station was installed during the 1964 floods to evacuate floodwaters into Rock Creek as protection for nearby croplands and wildlife habitat wetlands. Meiss Lake is fully inside the boundaries of the Butte Valley Wildlife Area managed by the California Department of Fish and Game, along with the historic Meiss Ranch which is also a part of the wildlife area.

== See also ==
- List of lakes in California
