= Hatfield, California–Oregon =

Unincorporated community in California, United States

Hatfield
- Unincorporated community
- Location within California
- Coordinates: 41°59′53″N 121°31′10″W
- Country: United States
- States: California, Oregon
- Counties: Siskiyou (California), Klamath (Oregon)
- Elevation: 4,065 ft (1,239 m)
- Time zone: UTC-8 (Pacific (PST))
  - Summer (DST): UTC-7 (PDT)
- Area codes: 530, 541, 458
- GNIS feature ID: 261153

Hatfield is an unincorporated community in both Siskiyou County, California, and Klamath County, Oregon, United States. Hatfield is located at the junction of Oregon Route 39, California State Route 161, and California State Route 139; all three routes terminate at a four-way junction in the community. The Lost River also runs through Hatfield. Hatfield is 3.6 miles (5.8 km) northwest of Tulelake, California, and 4.6 miles (7.4 km) east-southeast of Merrill, Oregon.

== See also ==
- Denio, Nevada
- McDermitt, Nevada–Oregon
