= Butte Valley Airport =

Coordinates: 41°53′14″N 121°58′32″W

- IATA: none; ICAO: none; FAA LID: A32

Summary
- Airport type: Public
- Owner: County of Siskiyou
- Serves: Dorris, California
- Elevation AMSL: 4,243 ft (1,293 m)
- Interactive map of Butte Valley Airport

Runways
Direction	Length		Surface
Direction	ft	m	Surface
16/34	4,300	1,311	Asphalt

Statistics (2005)
- Aircraft operations: 2,000
- Source: Federal Aviation Administration

Butte Valley Airport (FAA LID: A32, formerly CA03) is a county-owned public-use airport located five miles (8 km) southwest of the central business district of Dorris, in Siskiyou County, California, United States.

== Facilities and aircraft ==
Butte Valley Airport covers an area of 234 acres (95 ha) which contains one asphalt paved runway (16/34) measuring 4,300 x 60 ft (1,311 x 18 m). For the 12-month period ending December 31, 2005, the airport had 2,000 general aviation aircraft operations, an average of 5 per day.
