= Oregon Route 39 =

State highway in southern Oregon, US

Oregon Route 39
- Route 39; mainline in red, business route in blue

Route information
- Maintained by ODOT
- Length: 23.64 mi (38.04 km)

Major junctions
- South end: SR 139 / SR 161 near Merrill
- OR 140 in Klamath Falls; US 97 Bus. in Klamath Falls
- North end: US 97 in Klamath Falls

Location
- Country: United States
- State: Oregon

Highway system
- Oregon Highways; Interstate; US; State; Named; Scenic
← OR 38	→ OR 42

Oregon Route 39 is an Oregon state highway that runs between the city of Klamath Falls in Southern Oregon, and the California border between Merrill, Oregon, and Tulelake, California.

== Route description ==
Oregon Route 39 begins at an interchange with U.S. Route 97, north of downtown Klamath Falls, and just west of the main campus of the Oregon Institute of Technology. For the first 5 miles (8.0 km) of its existence, it is an urban expressway, known locally as either Crater Lake Parkway, the Alameda Bypass, or as the East Side Bypass, that skirts the eastern edge of Klamath Falls. The northernmost mile or so is shared with U.S. Route 97 Business, which departs from OR 39 and heads downtown via Esplanade Street.

East of the junction with Main Street, OR 39 continues in a southeasterly direction, skirting the main business district. The East Side Bypass ends at an intersection with South 6th Street, in the eastern suburb of Altamont. OR 39 then heads east-southeast on South 6th street for several more miles, until an intersection with Oregon Route 140. From U.S. Route 97, including the concurrency with U.S. 97 Business, to its departure from OR 140, including the concurrency, OR 39 consists of concurrent parts of the Klamath Falls-Malin Highway No. 50 (see Oregon highways and routes) and the Klamath Falls-Lakeview Highway No. 20.

At that intersection, OR 39 then turns due south, and is now known as the Klamath Falls-Malin Highway. OR 39 shares an alignment with OR 140 for about two miles (3 km), until OR 140 west diverges once again as the Southside Expressway. OR 39 then leave the Klamath Falls metropolitan area, and heads south-southeast for about 12 miles (19 km), until it reaches the town of Merrill. The highway then turns due east, running parallel to the California border. About 2 miles (3.2 km) east of Merrill, OR 39 and the Klamath Falls-Malin Highway depart; with the latter continuing east towards Malin, and OR 39 turning southeast. It runs southeast for 2 more miles as the Hatfield Highway No. 426 ending at the California border. The highway continues into California as State Route 139, which continues on to Tulelake, Canby, California, and other points in Northern California. At the state line is an intersection with State Route 161. Via State Route 299 and U.S. Route 395, one may continue on to Reno, Nevada.

== History ==
At one point in the past, OR 39 (or its predecessor) continued east into Malin, Oregon from the junction between Malin and Merrill; then headed southeast (reuniting with SR 139 south of Tulelake, CA). This stretch of road continues to be known as the Klamath Falls-Malin Highway within Oregon, and has an ODOT Highway number (not a route number) of 50. It is unclear whether or not this highway will ever be signed.

Prior to the construction of the Eastside Bypass, OR 39 used to run through Klamath Falls via 6th Street, through downtown, exiting downtown via Oregon Avenue. (This also was a prior alignment for Oregon Route 140; Oregon Avenue continues west past US 97, until it ends at a junction with OR 140 west of town. Portions of this route are currently signed as OR 39 Business.)

== Major intersections ==
The entire route is in Klamath County.

Location	mi	km	Destinations	Notes
	18.93	30.46	SR 139 south / SR 161 west – Tulelake, Dorris	California state line; road continues as SR 139
	1.78	2.86	OR 140 west to US 97 – Medford	Southern end of OR 140 overlap
Altamont	0.00	0.00	OR 140 east – Dairy, Lakeview, Winnemucca	Northern end of OR 140 overlap
Altamont	−2.24	−3.60	Klamath Falls-Lakeview Highway	Former OR 39 north/OR 140 west
Klamath Falls	−4.97	−8.00	US 97 Bus. south (Esplanade Street) – Klamath Falls City Center	Southern end of US 97 Bus. overlap
Klamath Falls	−6.81	−10.96	US 97 north / US 97 Bus. ends	Northern end of US 97 Bus. overlap; interchange; no access to US 97 south from OR 39/US 97 Bus. north
1.000 mi = 1.609 km; 1.000 km = 0.621 mi: Concurrency terminus
