= Adin, California =

Adin
- census-designated place
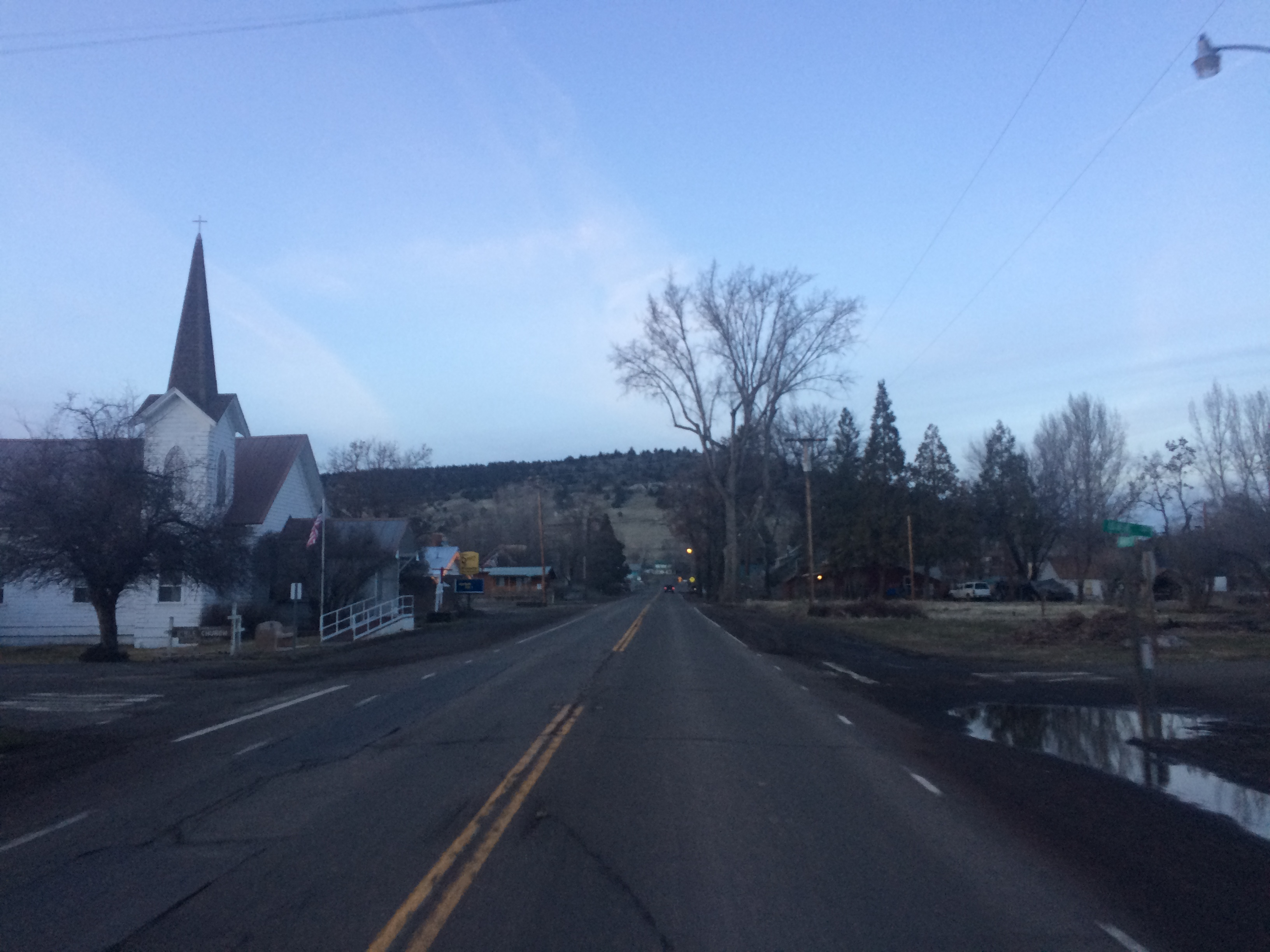
- Adin, as seen from California State Route 139 heading North

- Location within California Location within the United States
- Coordinates: 41°11′38″N 120°56′43″W
- Country: United States
- State: California
- County: Modoc

Area
  - Total: 2.93 sq mi (7.60 km^{2})
  - Land: 2.93 sq mi (7.59 km^{2})
  - Water: 0.0077 sq mi (0.02 km^{2}) 0.18%
- Elevation: 4,203 ft (1,281 m)

Population (2020)
  - Total: 205
  - Density: 70.0/sq mi (27.02/km^{2})
- Time zone: UTC-08:00 (PST)
  - Summer (DST): UTC-07:00 (PDT)
- GNIS feature ID: 256119; 2582927

Adin (formerly, Adinville and Aidenville) is a census-designated place in Modoc County, California, United States. It is located 29 miles (47 km) southwest of Alturas, at an elevation of 4,203 feet (1,281 m). Its population is 205 as of the 2020 census, down from 272 from the 2010 census.

Each summer, the town hosts the annual Golden State Star Party, a gathering of amateur and professional astronomers from California and parts of the United States.

== History ==
Adin, the first town in Modoc County west of the Warner Mountains, was founded in 1869 by Adin McDowell as the supply point for the mining town of Hayden in northern Lassen County, and was named for him in 1870. The Aidenville post office opened in 1871, and changed its name to Adin in 1876.

A 1913 book described Adin as having a population of 200, and as the chief town of the Big Valley. It became a sawmill town in the mid-1930s when the Edgerton Brothers Mill moved into town, from the Adin Mountains.

The town suffered devastating fires in 1904, 1915, 1931, and finally in 1939. Following the 1939 fire, the town organized a volunteer fire brigade.

== Geography ==
According to the United States Census Bureau, the CDP covers an area of 3.4 square miles (8.9 km^{2}), of which 99.82% is land and 0.18% is water.

=== Climate ===
This region experiences warm (but not hot) and dry summers, with no average monthly temperatures above 71.6 °F. According to the Köppen Climate Classification system, Adin has a warm-summer Mediterranean climate, abbreviated "Csb" on climate maps.

Climate data for Adin, California, 1991–2020 normals, extremes 1894–2012
Month	Jan	Feb	Mar	Apr	May	Jun	Jul	Aug	Sep	Oct	Nov	Dec	Year
Record high °F (°C)	68 (20)	71 (22)	80 (27)	85 (29)	93 (34)	102 (39)	110 (43)	104 (40)	103 (39)	90 (32)	80 (27)	68 (20)	110 (43)
Mean maximum °F (°C)	56.1 (13.4)	60.3 (15.7)	66.7 (19.3)	75.0 (23.9)	84.1 (28.9)	89.5 (31.9)	95.4 (35.2)	94.4 (34.7)	89.6 (32.0)	78.9 (26.1)	65.7 (18.7)	54.6 (12.6)	97.1 (36.2)
Mean daily maximum °F (°C)	47.0 (8.3)	50.4 (10.2)	55.7 (13.2)	61.8 (16.6)	70.9 (21.6)	79.4 (26.3)	88.7 (31.5)	88.2 (31.2)	82.6 (28.1)	68.8 (20.4)	54.5 (12.5)	45.3 (7.4)	66.1 (18.9)
Daily mean °F (°C)	35.7 (2.1)	38.1 (3.4)	42.2 (5.7)	47.0 (8.3)	54.8 (12.7)	61.5 (16.4)	69.7 (20.9)	68.4 (20.2)	62.7 (17.1)	51.7 (10.9)	41.2 (5.1)	34.2 (1.2)	50.6 (10.3)
Mean daily minimum °F (°C)	24.5 (−4.2)	25.8 (−3.4)	28.7 (−1.8)	32.2 (0.1)	38.8 (3.8)	43.6 (6.4)	50.7 (10.4)	48.6 (9.2)	42.7 (5.9)	34.7 (1.5)	27.8 (−2.3)	23.1 (−4.9)	35.1 (1.7)
Mean minimum °F (°C)	6.6 (−14.1)	8.8 (−12.9)	14.9 (−9.5)	20.5 (−6.4)	26.4 (−3.1)	32.6 (0.3)	39.6 (4.2)	38.4 (3.6)	29.8 (−1.2)	21.8 (−5.7)	12.9 (−10.6)	6.5 (−14.2)	−0.6 (−18.1)
Record low °F (°C)	−22 (−30)	−14 (−26)	−3 (−19)	7 (−14)	12 (−11)	12 (−11)	26 (−3)	29 (−2)	15 (−9)	7 (−14)	−10 (−23)	−22 (−30)	−22 (−30)
Average precipitation inches (mm)	1.91 (49)	1.55 (39)	1.74 (44)	1.60 (41)	1.74 (44)	0.76 (19)	0.24 (6.1)	0.19 (4.8)	0.36 (9.1)	1.02 (26)	1.65 (42)	2.24 (57)	15.00 (381)
Average snowfall inches (cm)	9.3 (24)	8.1 (21)	7.1 (18)	3.9 (9.9)	0.8 (2.0)	0.0 (0.0)	0.0 (0.0)	0.0 (0.0)	0.0 (0.0)	0.4 (1.0)	5.2 (13)	10.3 (26)	45.1 (114.9)
Average extreme snow depth inches (cm)	4.1 (10)	2.9 (7.4)	2.2 (5.6)	0.3 (0.76)	0.0 (0.0)	0.0 (0.0)	0.0 (0.0)	0.0 (0.0)	0.0 (0.0)	0.2 (0.51)	1.2 (3.0)	3.1 (7.9)	6.4 (16)
Average precipitation days (≥ 0.01 in)	10.5	9.0	11.0	9.4	7.7	4.3	1.6	1.6	2.5	5.1	8.6	10.9	82.2
Average snowy days (≥ 0.1 in)	4.9	3.6	3.9	2.3	0.4	0.0	0.0	0.0	0.1	0.3	2.8	5.4	23.7
Source 1: NOAA
Source 2: National Weather Service (mean maxima/minima 1981–2010)

== Demographics ==
Historical population
Census	Pop.	Note	%±
2010	272		—
2020	205		−24.6%
U.S. Decennial Census; 1860–1870 1880-1890; 1900 1910 1920; 1930 1940 1950; 1960 1970 1980; 1990 2000 2010; 2020

Adin first appeared as a census designated place in the 2010 U.S. census.

=== Racial and ethnic composition ===
Adin CDP, California – Racial and ethnic composition Note: the US Census treats Hispanic/Latino as an ethnic category. This table excludes Latinos from the racial categories and assigns them to a separate category. Hispanics/Latinos may be of any race.
Race / Ethnicity (NH = Non-Hispanic)	Pop 2010	Pop 2020	% 2010	% 2020
White alone (NH)	224	173	82.35%	84.39%
Black or African American alone (NH)	2	0	0.74%	0.00%
Native American or Alaska Native alone (NH)	5	8	1.84%	3.90%
Asian alone (NH)	0	0	0.00%	0.00%
Native Hawaiian or Pacific Islander alone (NH)	0	0	0.00%	0.00%
Other race alone (NH)	0	5	0.00%	2.44%
Mixed race or Multiracial (NH)	9	9	3.31%	4.39%
Hispanic or Latino (any race)	32	10	11.76%	4.88%
Total	272	205	100.00%	100.00%

=== 2020 census ===
As of the 2020 census, Adin had a population of 205. The population density was 70.0 inhabitants per square mile (27.0/km^{2}). All residents (100.0%) lived in rural areas, with 0.0% living in urban areas.

The age distribution was 18.5% under the age of 18, 2.9% aged 18 to 24, 19.0% aged 25 to 44, 37.1% aged 45 to 64, and 22.4% who were 65 years of age or older. The median age was 57.6 years. For every 100 females there were 88.1 males, and for every 100 females age 18 and over there were 96.5 males age 18 and over.

There were 101 households, of which 16.8% had children under the age of 18 living in them. Of all households, 45.5% were married-couple households, 8.9% were cohabiting couple households, 24.8% were households with a male householder and no spouse or partner present, and 20.8% were households with a female householder and no spouse or partner present. About 38.6% of all households were made up of individuals and 21.8% had someone living alone who was 65 years of age or older. The average household size was 2.03. There were 54 families (53.5% of all households).

There were 130 housing units at an average density of 44.4 units per square mile (17.1 units/km^{2}), of which 22.3% were vacant. The homeowner vacancy rate was 0.0% and the rental vacancy rate was 9.1%. Of the occupied units, 70.3% were owner-occupied and 29.7% were renter-occupied.

== Politics ==
In the state legislature, Adin is in the 1st senatorial district, represented by Republican Megan Dahle, and the 1st Assembly district, represented by Republican Heather Hadwick.

Federally, Adin is in California's 1st congressional district, represented by Republican James Gallagher.

== Education ==
Big Valley Joint Unified School District is the local school district.
