= Nightfire Island =

Prehistoric human settlement location

Nightfire Island (Sheepy Island)
- Shapasheni (Klamath-Modoc)
- Archeological Site 4-SK-4
- Interactive map of Nightfire Island (Sheepy Island)
- 41.97338943°N 121.8155°W
- Nearest city: Dorris, California

Site notes
- Area: 2.5 acres (1.0 ha)

Archeological Site 4-SK-4, nearest to Dorris, California, is a stratified archeological site that was a hunter-gatherer village west of Lower Klamath Lake. The site is located in the heart of the Klamath Basin wetlands, on the west shores of Sheepy Lake at Sheepy Creek. It has also been known as Nightfire Island and as Sheepy Island. Modern Modocs have called the island Shapasheni, meaning "where the sun and moon live", or "home of the sun and the moon.

Prehistorically, it served as a village camp on a man-made mound in the wetlands and as a ceremonial site. The site shows evidence of human occupancy from the peak of the Hypsithermal era, approximately 7,000 years ago. Archeologist have unearthed three villages one on top of the other through the centuries. Obsidian arrowheads are frequent finds, whose varieties include Northern Sided Notched, Elko type corner notched, and Gunther type points.

Excavations and sampling started in 1966 by Klamath educator Carrol Howe. The site was described by Garth Sampson in a 1985 publication of the University of Oregon.

== History ==
Human occupation of the Klamath Basin areas may have begun around 6000 BCE. Settlement by Modoc people on the banks of Sheepy Creek is likely to have begun approximately 4000 years BCE, shortly after the eruption of Mount Mazama, as evidenced by a layer of volcanic ash on the lake bed just below the layer that marks the appearance of a new village.

The shallow water level of the marsh, the clay loam, and the basalt rubble basin extended all around and over this area afforded only a weak foundation for settlement. To compensate, inhabitants carried in rocks to strengthen the village's foundation. After centuries of this procedure, they had built an island of an area approximately 2.5 acres (1.0 ha).

Surrounded by marshlands, the villagers could fish and hunt waterfowl. The springs nearest to Nightfire Island are geothermal waters, adding to the comfort of the villagers. During the dry months, the receding water levels allowed for the establishment of a secure hunting station. Charcoal remains show evidence of cooking pits and cremated burial sites within the island. Bones show an early abundance of duck with additional diversity appearing in later years.

Waterfowl droppings within layers of the excavation site show that there were times where the site was abandoned for several hundred years, probably because of the rising of the levels of Indian Tom Lake, climate change during the hot and dry middle Holocene, or changes in the Keno fault. When water levels receded, occupation resumed with the appearance of black charcoal levels from cooking and cremation fires.

The environment that Nightfire's inhabitants would have known ceased to exist when the Southern Pacific Railway built a railway embankment along the downstream edge of Lower Klamath Lake, they put in a drainage conduit that unintentionally emptied most of the lake. The tule marshes that made Nightfire an island have been gone, replaced by pastures and farm fields.

== Archeology ==
Excavations of archeological site 4-SK-4 have produced large collections of bird, mammal, and fish bones, large amounts of obsidian technology (particularly Elko points), bone artifacts, mortars and other stone artifacts as well as other cultural detritus. These occupational debris reach a maximum of 3 meters deep. The lower stratum is lacustrine, waterway diatom-rich silt from the original lake floor present during the first occupation of the site. From there, the strata consist of a series of silt, streamland and loam forming a duripan horizon.

Villagers cooked small animals by boiling them in baskets, while larger animals were cooked in rock roasting ovens primarily composed of large basalt rocks. Along with oven rocks, other rocks included broken fragments of mortar and pestles and banded stones used for weights. Banded rocks are generally used for outdoor support such as tying down canoes. On Nightfire Island, banded rocks may have been used for indoor weights since they were found inside the houses and in roasting pits. The number of these rocks and their weight exceeds the traditional canoe weights and even the weights used by the Modoc people for the balsa-type rafts. The banded rocks from Nightfire Island show signs of burning mixed with charcoal from cooking fires. Some stones were used for boiling food in basketry by placing the hot basalt or lava stones into tightly packed woven water-filled baskets.

The presence of buffalo hide on Nightfire Island suggest the village hunters used obsidian and spear-throwers. The most common arrow point found on the site is the Cascade-type. Additionally, the excavation has produced several pressure-flaking tools made of bone and antler used for projectiles, especially before the bow and arrow were in use. Stone anvils from the excavation had single and bilateral worn out pits used for knapping the obsidian to break the spalls from the rock. The large amount of anvils found on Nightfire Island suggest they were used for other purposes than knapping, including cracking bones. The side pits are not worn out consistent with the use as a maul or for pounding food.

While Modocs of the Great Basin had chipped-stone crescents or lunates, their presence has not been confirmed on Nightfire Island. Some smaller versions have been excavated but they are of a different shape and material. An increase in small, stemmed and corner notched arrowheads have been discovered on layers of approximately 2,500 years BCE which corresponds to the peak in the dabbling duck remains and the adoption of the bow and arrow.

=== Culture ===
Excavations have unearthed structures that suggest buildings similar to sweat lodges on Nightfire Island. Carbon-14 dated to approximately 1,500 years ago, these would be the oldest remains of a sweat lodge.

A higher than usual frequency of neuronal malformations in remains discovered within Nightfire Island suggest tentatively that inbreeding might have occurred. Studies of skeletal remains also revealed an unusually large and deep fossae lateral in the 1st and 2nd sacral tuberosities, suggesting a very strong postural ligament attachment.

Nightfire Modocs were prominent waterfowl hunters. While rainfall was not consistent, the alkali open marshes held in place by block-fault ridges provided a rich habitat for local and migratory waterfowl. In the Fall pintails and mallards arrived first along the Pacific Flyway and later in the season baldpates and canvasbacks. Coot and the common merganser were common as overwinter birds. On the northern direction, white snow geese arrived first and white fronted geese were among the latest to fly by. Nightfire Island soils didn't contain egg shells, however residents took advantage of bird-nesting season for the stability of their life cycle.

=== Zooarchaeology ===
Analysis of samples from Nightfire Island show that residents ate a great variety of birds: Podiceps spp., Cygnus spp., Branta spp., Anas spp., Aythya spp., Bucephala spp., and Mergus spp. Additionally, bones of eagles, owls and raven were also found among the kitchen midden. Deeper levels of the marshy lake allowed for a higher quantity of waterfowl during the CE.

The bird life of Nightfire Island includes the following species dated by radiocarbon determinations:

Dates and species defined by number of identified specimens
from 4000 to 3000 BC	from 3000 to 2200 BC	from 2020 BC-AD 0	from 0-1400 AD
Common loon (0)	Common loon (0)	Common loon (5)	Common loon (17)
Horned grebe (0)	Horned grebe (1)	Horned grebe (5)	Horned grebe (25)
Black-necked grebe (1)	Black-necked grebe (5)	Black-necked grebe (15)	Black-necked grebe (10)
Western grebe (1)	Western grebe (2)	Western grebe (28)	Western grebe (280)
Pied-billed grebe (5)	Pied-billed grebe (9)	Pied-billed grebe (27)	Pied-billed grebe (51)
American white pelican (0)	American white pelican (1)	American white pelican (4)	American white pelican (0)
Double-crested cormorant (1)	Double-crested cormorant (0)	Double-crested cormorant (0)	Double-crested cormorant (6)
Great blue heron (1)	Great blue heron (0)	Great blue heron (0)	Great blue heron (4)
Black-crowned night heron (0)	Black-crowned night heron (1)	Black-crowned night heron (3)	Black-crowned night heron (2)
American bittern (1)	American bittern (1)	American bittern (1)	American bittern (1)
Tundra swan (1)	Tundra swan (6)	Tundra swan (1)	Tundra swan (6)
Trumpeter swan (1)	Trumpeter swan (0)	Trumpeter swan (2)	Trumpeter swan (1)
Canada goose (2)	Canada goose (4)	Canada goose (16)	Canada goose (6)
Mallard duck (3)	Mallard duck (45)	Mallard duck (95)	Mallard duck (52)
Gadwall, pintails, American wigeon, and/or shovelers (3)	Gadwall, pintails, American wigeon, and/or shovelers (19)	Gadwall, pintails, American wigeon, and/or shovelers (41)	Gadwall, pintails, American wigeon, and/or shovelers (51)
Green-winged teal, Blue-winged teal and/or Cinnamon teal (1)	Green-winged teal, Blue-winged teal and/or Cinnamon teal (2)	Green-winged teal, Blue-winged teal and/or Cinnamon teal (36)	Green-winged teal, Blue-winged teal and/or Cinnamon teal (14)
Ring-necked duck (0)	Ring-necked duck (0)	Ring-necked duck (1)	Ring-necked duck (112)
Canvasback (0)	Canvasback (2)	Canvasback (15)	Canvasback (131)
Greater scaup, Redhead duck, and/or Lesser scaup (4)	Greater scaup, Redhead duck, and/or Lesser scaup (7)	Greater scaup, Redhead duck, and/or Lesser scaup (12)	Greater scaup, Redhead duck, and/or Lesser scaup (3)
Common goldeneye (0)	Common goldeneye (0)	Common goldeneye (2)	Common goldeneye (0)
Bufflehead (3)	Bufflehead (3)	Bufflehead (13)	Bufflehead (25)
Ruddy duck (17)	Ruddy duck (9)	Ruddy duck (48)	Ruddy duck (92)
Hooded merganser (0)	Hooded merganser (0)	Hooded merganser (3)	Hooded merganser (103)
Common merganser (8)	Common merganser (18)	Common merganser (24)	Common merganser (111)
Red-breasted merganser (0)	Red-breasted merganser (1)	Red-breasted merganser (0)	Red-breasted merganser (1)
Golden eagle (1)	Golden eagle (1)	Golden eagle (61)	Golden eagle (0)
Bald eagles (3)	Bald eagles (3)	Bald eagles (1)	Bald eagles (1)
Hen harrier (0)	Hen harrier (0)	Hen harrier (1)	Hen harrier (1)
Greater sage-grouse (1)	Greater sage-grouse (0)	Greater sage-grouse (4)	Greater sage-grouse (0)
American coot (20)	American coot (53)	American coot (387)	American coot (1220)
Killdeer (0)	Killdeer (1)	Killdeer (0)	Killdeer (0)
European herring gull (0)	European herring gull (0)	European herring gull (0)	European herring gull (1)
Great horned owls (0)	Great horned owls (0)	Great horned owls (0)	Great horned owls (1)
Snowy owl (0)	Snowy owl (0)	Snowy owl (1)	Snowy owl (0)
Short-eared owl (0)	Short-eared owl (0)	Short-eared owl (0)	Short-eared owl (1)
Common raven (0)	Common raven (0)	Common raven (0)	Common raven (1)

== Bibliography ==
- Howe, Carrol B (1979). Ancient Modocs of California and Oregon. Binford & Mort. ISBN 9780832303371.
