= Ravendale, California =

Unincorporated community in California, United States

Ravendale
- Unincorporated community
- Location in California Ravendale (the United States)
- Coordinates: 40°47′55″N 120°21′55″W
- Country: United States
- State: California
- County: Lassen
- Elevation: 5,305 ft (1,617 m)

Ravendale is an unincorporated community in Lassen County, California, United States. It is located 7 miles (11 km) southeast of Termo, at an elevation of 5,305 feet (1,617 m). The town was a station on the Nevada-California-Oregon Railway line, but unlike many such towns, survived past the abandonment of the line in the late 1990s.

The Ravendale US post office opened in 1910, closed in 1920, and re-opened in 1921. The ZIP Code is 96123.

The county maintains an unattended airstrip at the town with the FAA identifier O39.

Susanville District, Ravendale Resource Area, Bureau of Land Management operates a fire station here. The fire station transmitter call sign is KMC407. There is also a Ravendale Volunteer Fire Department.

In 1939, Ravendale Elementary School's attendance dropped to zero students. The trustees questioned whether they were obligated to pay a teacher's salary and this matter was referred to California Attorney General, Earl Warren, who ruled in favor of the teacher.
