= Termo, California =

Unincorporated community in California, United States

Termo
- ghost town
- Location in California Termo (the United States)
- Coordinates: 40°51′57″N 120°27′37″W
- Country: United States
- State: California
- County: Lassen
- Elevation: 5,305 ft (1,617 m)
- ZIP code: 96132
- Area codes: 530, 837

Termo (also, Snowstorm and Armstrong) is a ghost town in Lassen County, California, United States. It was located on the now abandoned Southern Pacific Railroad line, 32 miles (51 km) north-northeast of Susanville, at an elevation of 5305 feet (1617 m). This town straddles U.S. Highway 395 north of Ravendale.

It was the original 1900 terminus of the Nevada–California–Oregon Railway, before the line was extended north. A post office opened in 1908, closed in 1914, and re-opened in 1915.
