= Merrill, Oregon =

Merrill
- City
- Merrill, Oregon
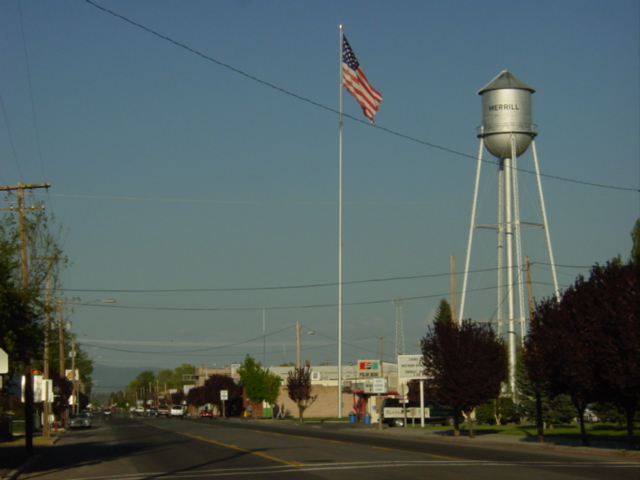

- Location in Oregon
- Coordinates: 42°01′34″N 121°36′03″W
- Country: United States
- State: Oregon
- County: Klamath
- Incorporated: 1903

Area
  - Total: 0.46 sq mi (1.19 km^{2})
  - Land: 0.46 sq mi (1.19 km^{2})
  - Water: 0 sq mi (0.00 km^{2})
- Elevation: 4,072 ft (1,241 m)

Population (2020)
  - Total: 821
  - Density: 1,788.8/sq mi (690.66/km^{2})
- Time zone: UTC-8 (Pacific)
  - Summer (DST): UTC-7 (Pacific)
- ZIP code: 97633
- Area code: 541
- FIPS code: 41-47700
- GNIS feature ID: 2411085
- Website: cityofmerrill.org

Merrill is a city in Klamath County, Oregon, United States. As of the 2020 census, Merrill had a population of 821.

Merrill is an agricultural area and is home to an annual Potato Festival. The area was also part of the Klamath Basin water crisis pitting agricultural interests against endangered species water requirements, tribal interests, and environmentalists.

Merrill was the birthplace and boyhood home of Carl Barks, the Disney comics artist who created Scrooge McDuck, among other characters. It is home to the Raiders of Lost River Jr./Sr. High School.

== Geography ==
Merrill is southern Klamath County, near the Oregon–California border. It is along Oregon Route 39 southeast of Klamath Falls and northwest of Tulelake. Lower Klamath Lake and Tule Lake, both in California, are slightly south of Merrill. By highway, the city is 20 miles (32 km) from Klamath Falls and 300 miles (480 km) from Portland.

The Lost River flows by Merrill. Mount Shasta in the Cascade Range southwest of Merrill, although it lies across the California state line, is visible from the city. According to the United States Census Bureau, the city has a total area of 0.46 square miles (1.19 km^{2}), all of it land.

=== Climate ===
The region experiences warm (but not hot) and dry summers, with no average monthly temperatures above 71.6 °F (22.0 °C). According to the Köppen Climate Classification system, Merrill has a warm-summer Mediterranean climate, abbreviated Csb on climate maps.

== History ==
Merrill was named for rancher Nathan S. Merrill, who settled at this location in 1890. A post office was established in Merrill in 1896. H. E. Momyre was the postmaster. The first business in Merrill was a grist mill.

Situated within the ancestral lands of the Modoc people, modern-day Merrill, Oregon, is the site of the Battle of Lost River, which took place on November 29, 1872. This engagement marked the first armed conflict between the United States Army and the Modoc tribe during the Modoc War.

== Economy ==
As of 2002, the five largest employers in Merrill were the Malin Potato Coop, Klamath County School District, the Martin Food Center, the Merrill Grain and Feed Center, and Country Boy Meats.

== Demographics ==
Historical population
| Census | Pop. | Note | %± |
|---|---|---|---|
| 1900 | 67 | | — |
| 1910 | 400 | | 497.0% |
| 1920 | 237 | | −40.7% |
| 1930 | 306 | | 29.1% |
| 1940 | 648 | | 111.8% |
| 1950 | 835 | | 28.9% |
| 1960 | 804 | | −3.7% |
| 1970 | 722 | | −10.2% |
| 1980 | 809 | | 12.0% |
| 1990 | 837 | | 3.5% |
| 2000 | 897 | | 7.2% |
| 2010 | 844 | | −5.9% |
| 2020 | 821 | | −2.7% |
Source: U.S. Decennial Census

=== 2020 census ===
As of the 2020 census, Merrill had a population of 821. The median age was 35.3 years. 25.7% of residents were under the age of 18 and 13.6% of residents were 65 years of age or older. For every 100 females there were 102.7 males, and for every 100 females age 18 and over there were 106.8 males age 18 and over.

0% of residents lived in urban areas, while 100.0% lived in rural areas.

There were 307 households in Merrill, of which 42.3% had children under the age of 18 living in them. Of all households, 49.8% were married-couple households, 21.5% were households with a male householder and no spouse or partner present, and 23.1% were households with a female householder and no spouse or partner present. About 21.1% of all households were made up of individuals and 8.2% had someone living alone who was 65 years of age or older.

There were 338 housing units, of which 9.2% were vacant. Among occupied housing units, 59.9% were owner-occupied and 40.1% were renter-occupied. The homeowner vacancy rate was 1.1% and the rental vacancy rate was 5.8%.

Racial composition as of the 2020 census
| Race | Number | Percentage |
|---|---|---|
| White | 447 | 54.4% |
| Black or African American | 4 | 0.5% |
| American Indian and Alaska Native | 9 | 1.1% |
| Asian | 5 | 0.6% |
| Native Hawaiian and Other Pacific Islander | 6 | 0.7% |
| Some other race | 232 | 28.3% |
| Two or more races | 118 | 14.4% |
| Hispanic or Latino (of any race) | 409 | 49.8% |

=== 2010 census ===
As of the census of 2010, there were 844 people, 308 households, and 221 families residing in the city. The population density was 1,834.8 inhabitants per square mile (708.4/km^{2}). There were 347 housing units at an average density of 754.3 per square mile (291.2/km^{2}). The racial makeup of the city was 70.9% White, 0.1% African American, 1.5% Native American, 23.8% from other races, and 3.7% from two or more races. Hispanic or Latino of any race were 43.1% of the population.

There were 308 households, of which 40.3% had children under the age of 18 living with them, 52.6% were married couples living together, 13.6% had a female householder with no husband present, 5.5% had a male householder with no wife present, and 28.2% were non-families. 24.4% of all households were made up of individuals, and 7.8% had someone living alone who was 65 years of age or older. The average household size was 2.73 and the average family size was 3.23.

The median age in the city was 35.7 years. 29% of residents were under the age of 18; 10% were between the ages of 18 and 24; 21.8% were from 25 to 44; 26.6% were from 45 to 64; and 12.6% were 65 years of age or older. The gender makeup of the city was 50.7% male and 49.3% female.

=== 2000 census ===
As of the census of 2000, there were 897 people, 344 households, and 230 families residing in the city. The population density was 2,045.4 inhabitants per square mile (789.7/km^{2}). There were 380 housing units at an average density of 866.5 per square mile (334.6/km^{2}). The racial makeup of the city was 73.13% White, 0.11% African American, 1.00% Native American, 0.22% Asian, 19.18% from other races, 6.35% from two or more races; 33.44% of the population were Hispanic or Latino of any race.

There were 344 households, out of which 34.6% had children under the age of 18 living with them, 52.0% were married couples living together, 10.8% had a female householder with no husband present, 33.1% were non-families, 27.9% of all households were made up of individuals, and 11.9% had someone living alone who was 65 years of age or older.

The average household size was 2.61 and the average family size was 3.22. The age distribution was 28.4% under the age of 18, 8.1% from 18 to 24, 29.2% from 25 to 44, 18.4% from 45 to 64, and 15.8% who were 65 years of age or older. The median age was 35 years. For every 100 females, there were 92.5 males. For every 100 females age 18 and over, there were 87.2 males.

The median income for a household in the city was $23,304, and the median income for a family was $27,639. Males had a median income of $26,250 versus $19,583 for females. The per capita income for the city was $11,803. Approximately 19.9% of families and 24.0% of the population were below the poverty line, including 32.0% of those under age 18 and 12.0% of those age 65 or over.

== Education ==
It is within the Klamath County School District.

It is in the territory of Klamath Community College.
