= Lower Klamath National Wildlife Refuge =

Wildlife refuge and National Historic Landmark in northern California, United States

- IUCN category IV (habitat/species management area)
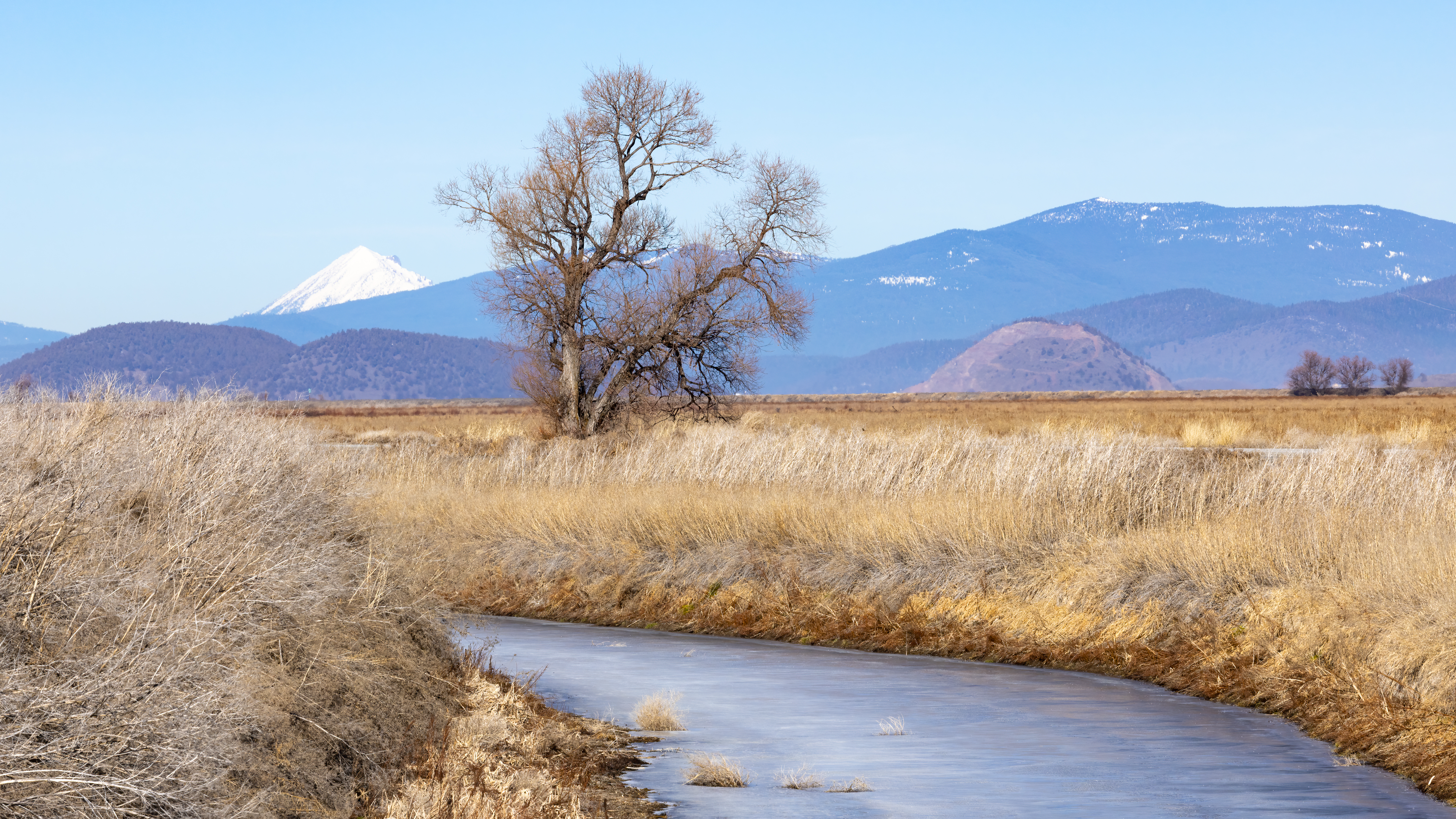
- Winter scene at north Klamath NWR

- Location within the United States
- Location: Siskiyou County, California / Klamath County, Oregon, United States
- Nearest city: Klamath Falls, OR
- Coordinates: 41°56′56″N 121°41′48″W
- Area: 50,913 acres (206.04 km^{2})
- Established: 1908
- Governing body: United States Fish and Wildlife Service
- Website: Lower Klamath NWR

U.S. National Register of Historic Places
- Reference no.: 66000238

U.S. National Historic Landmark
- Designated: January 12, 1965

The Lower Klamath National Wildlife Refuge is a National Wildlife Refuge of the United States on the border between California and Oregon. It is operated by the United States Fish and Wildlife Service. The refuge was designated a National Historic Landmark on October 16, 1965.

Lower Klamath National Wildlife Refuge, established by President Theodore Roosevelt in 1908, was the first waterfowl refuge in the United States. It is located in the Klamath Basin near Klamath Falls, Oregon. It has a total area of 50,912.68 acres (206.04 km^{2}), of which 44,294.55 acres (179.25 km^{2}) are in California and 6,618.13 acres (26.78 km^{2}) are in Oregon. The refuge includes shallow freshwater marshes, open water, grassy uplands, and croplands that are intensively managed to provide foraging and breeding habitat for waterfowl and other animals. The market hunting of migratory birds in the late 19th century created the need for preservation and creation of a wildlife refuge.

Refuge objectives include the protection of habitat for flora and fauna, including migrating waterfowl, and preserving the biodiversity of the Klamath Basin. It works to integrate wetlands and sustainable agriculture and promote integrated pest management. The refuge provides wildlife-related public services, including education, hunting, and viewing and photography opportunities.

Avian species on the refuge include the bald eagle, golden eagle, American white pelican, white-faced ibis, snow goose, Ross's goose, greater white-fronted goose, Canada goose, peregrine falcon, northern pintail, mallard, gadwall, canvasback, western grebe, eared grebe, black tern, and tricolored blackbird.

Conservation and management activities include the maintenance of a local water infrastructure and the monitoring of the interaction between agriculture and habitat. Issues in focus include the loss of wetland habitat, the degradation of water quality, drought, and water rights.

== Gallery ==
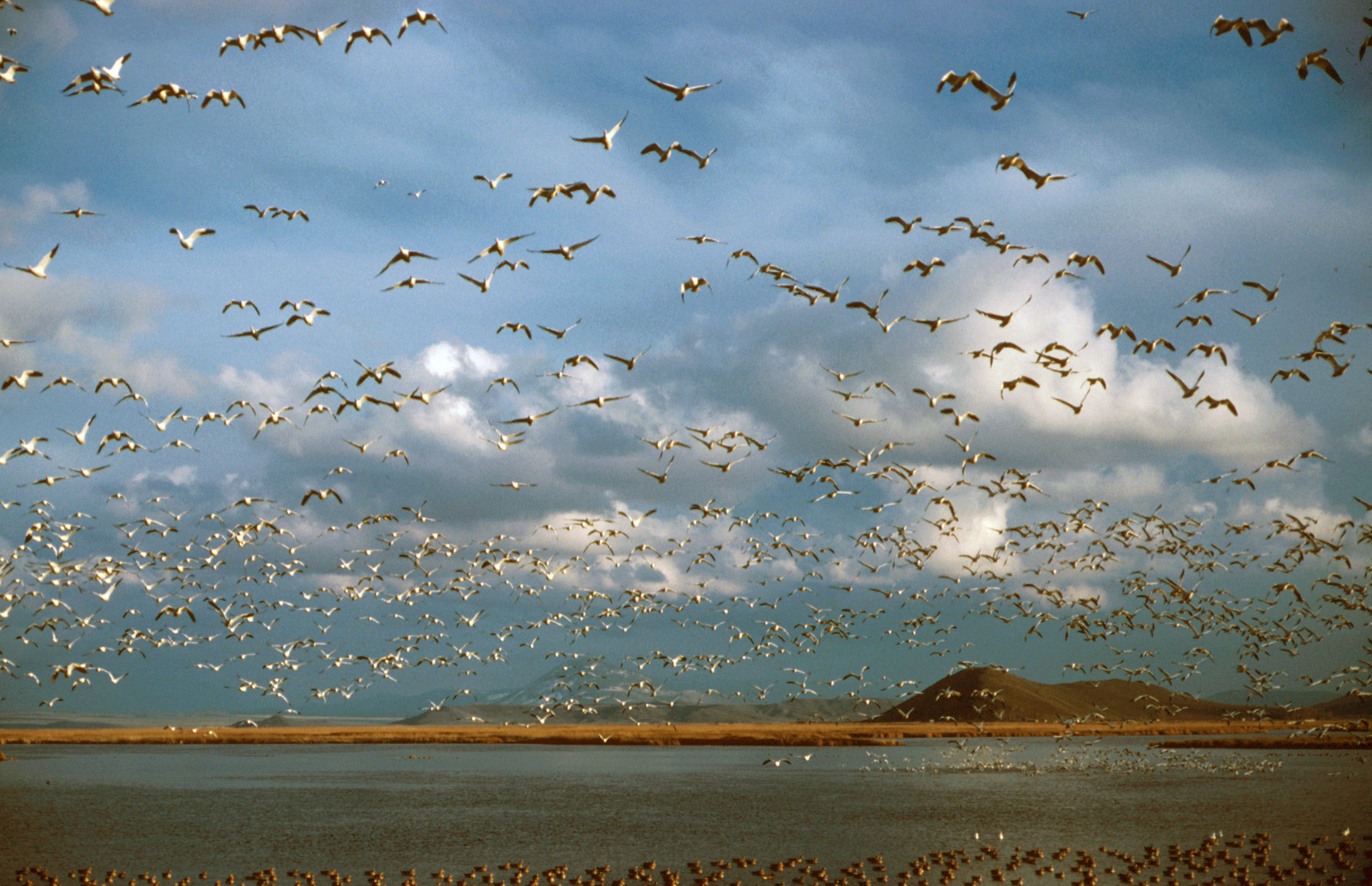
Ross's geese on a freshwater marsh

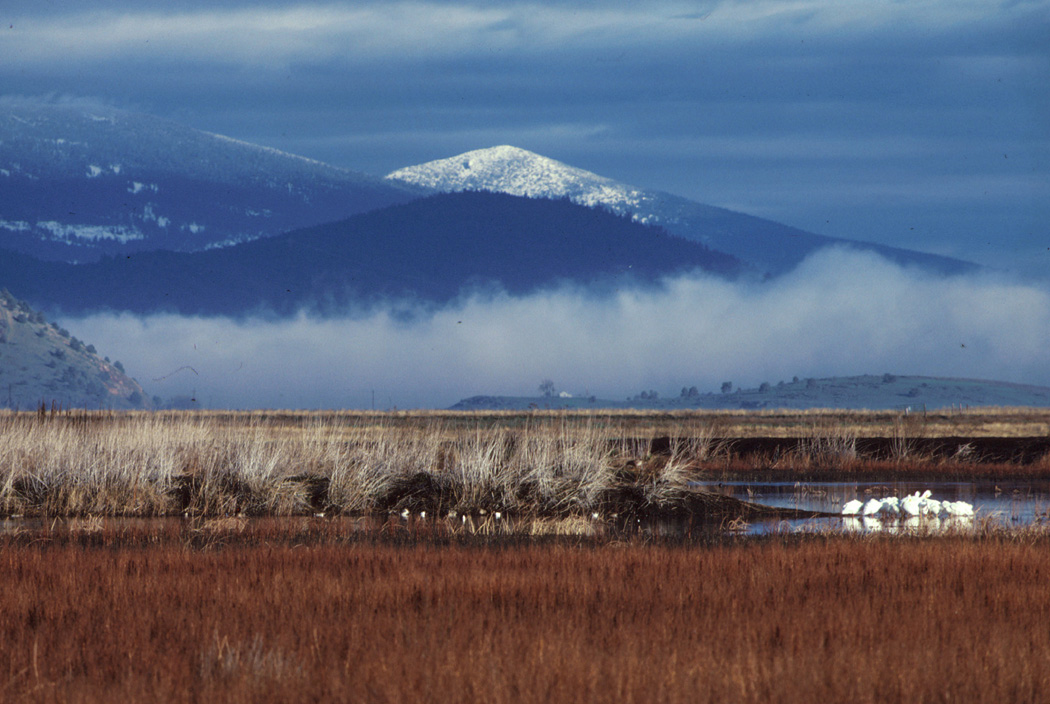
Mountains

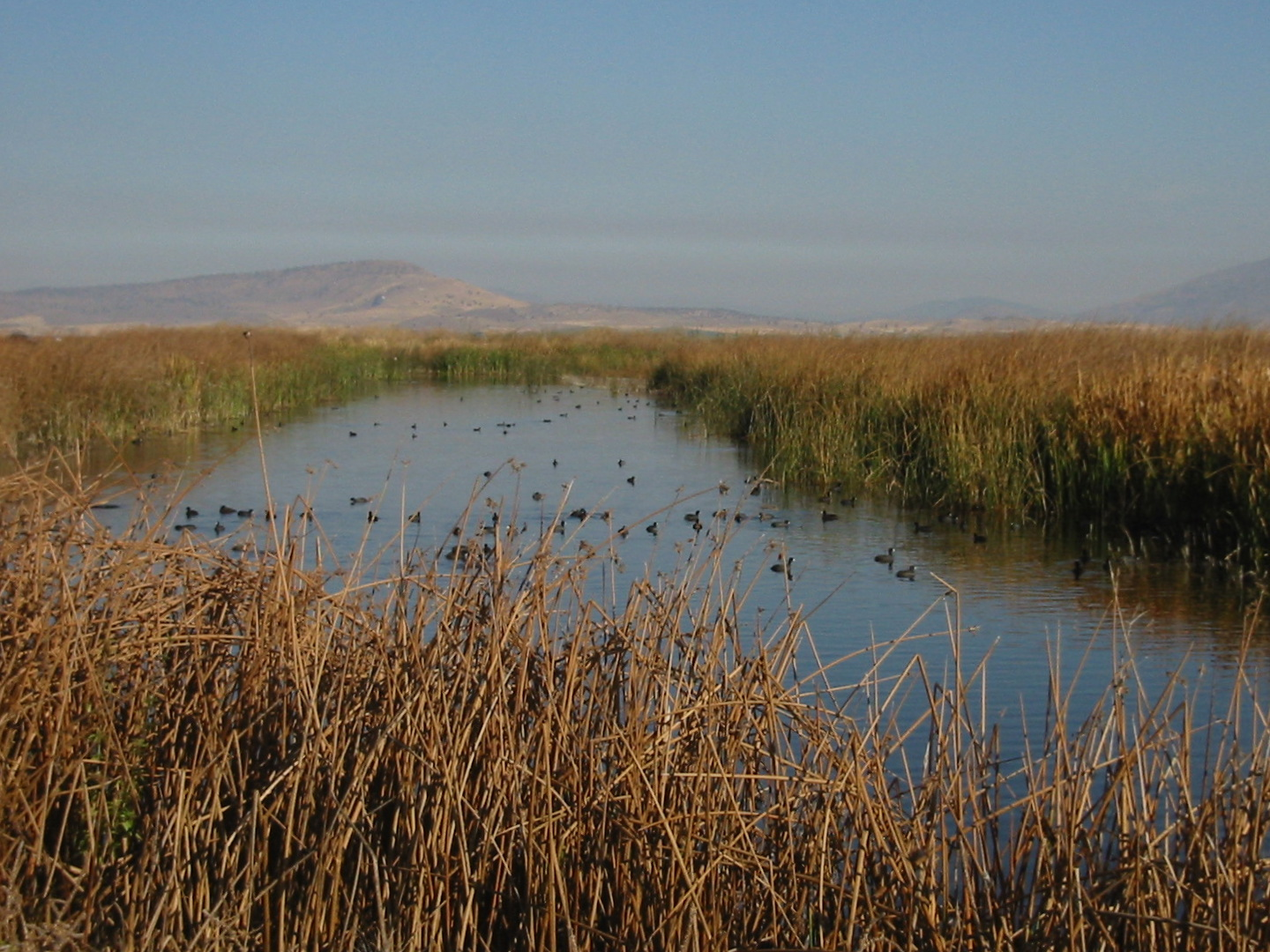
Marsh with American coots

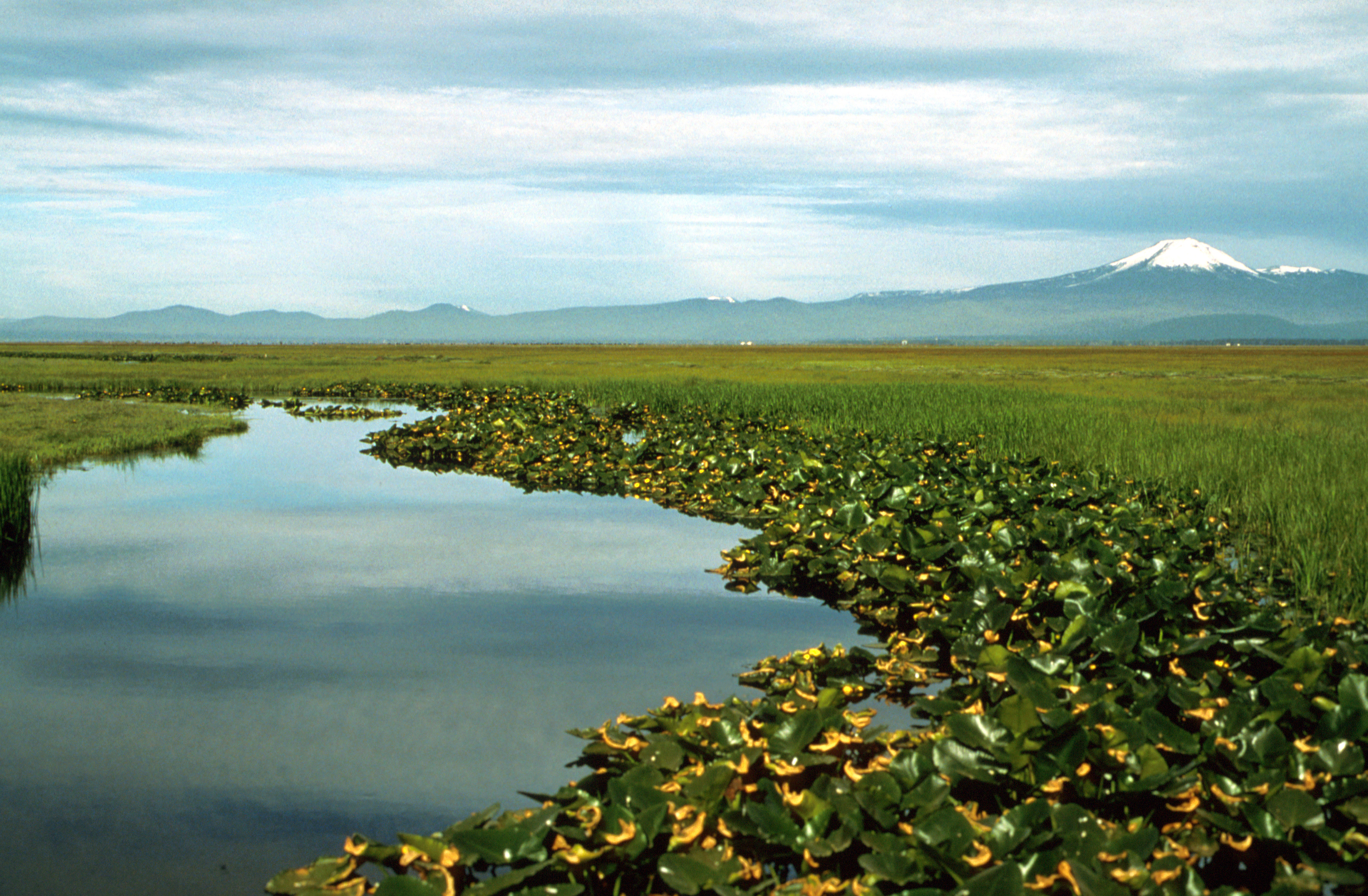
Lower Klamath Lake marsh

== See also ==
- List of largest National Wildlife Refuges
- List of National Wildlife Refuges
- Volcanic Legacy Scenic Byway
