= Butte Valley National Grassland =

Protected area in Siskiyou County, California

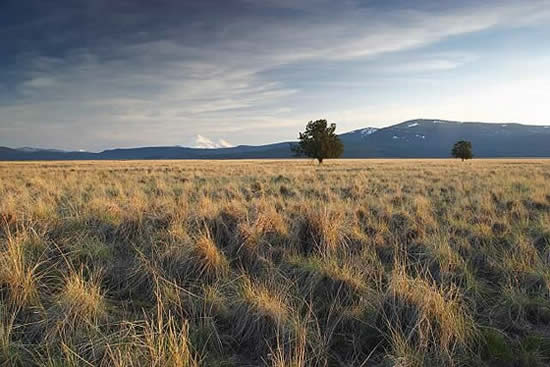

- Location within California Location within the United States
- Interactive map of Butte Valley National Grassland
- Location: Siskiyou County, California, United States
- Nearest city: Dorris, CA
- Coordinates: 41.899211°N 122.025146°W
- Area: 18,425 acres (74.56 km^{2})
- Established: July 1991
- Governing body: U.S. Forest Service
- Website: Butte Valley National Grassland

Butte Valley National Grassland is a 18,425-acre (7,456 ha) United States National Grassland located in northern California. Administered by the United States Forest Service, Klamath National Forest, it is located in northern Siskiyou County, near the Oregon border, between the communities of Dorris and Macdoel along U.S. Highway 97. It was dedicated in July 1991 as the nation's 20th National Grassland. It is administered as part of the Klamath National Forest, and is the sole National Grassland in California and in Region 5 (Pacific Southwest) of the Forest Service. Administrative offices are located in Macdoel, California.

== Geography ==
The area is located in the Klamath River basin at an elevation of approximately 4,200 feet (1,280 m). The annual precipitation is approximately 12 inches (300 mm). It consists primarily of flat, sandy soils and a dry lake bed. The area includes sweeping views of the Cascade Range and Mount Shasta.

== History ==
The area attracted homesteaders in the late 19th century who ditched, drained, plowed, and grazed the land. Overuse caused a decline in productivity that was exacerbated by the drought of the 1930s. The U.S. government purchased submarginal lands in 1937. The lands were then administered by the Soil Conservation Service (now the Natural Resources Conservation Service) which began stabilizing the land by planting of over 4,000 acres (1,600 ha) of crested wheatgrass. In the 1940s a portion of the area was used as bombing range. Grazing of the land continued until its designation as a National Grassland in 1991.

== Flora and fauna ==
The current habitat of the grassland consists of open sagebrush, rabbit brush, juniper and native bunch grasses.

Bird watching is a popular recreational activity. Birds found in the grassland include sage thrasher and Brewer's sparrow in the spring, summer and fall. Resident bird species include the horned lark and lark sparrow. Nesting raptors include golden eagle, prairie falcon, red-tailed hawk and Swainson's hawk, drawn by resident rodents in the fields. Ferruginous hawk have successfully nested in recent years.

== See also ==
- Native grasses of California
- Grasslands of California
