= Macdoel, California =

Macdoel
- Unincorporated Community; Census Designated Place
- Location in Siskiyou County and the state of California

- Location in the United States
- Coordinates: 41°49′36″N 122°0′19″W
- Country: United States of America
- State: California
- County: Siskiyou

Area
  - Total: 0.167 sq mi (0.433 km^{2})
  - Land: 0.167 sq mi (0.433 km^{2})
  - Water: 0 sq mi (0 km^{2}) 0%
- Elevation: 4,252 ft (1,296 m)

Population (2020)
  - Total: 86
  - Density: 510/sq mi (200/km^{2})
- Time zone: UTC-8 (Pacific (PST))
  - Summer (DST): UTC-7 (PDT)
- ZIP code: 96058
- Area code: 530
- FIPS code: 06-44812
- GNIS feature ID: 1659030

Macdoel is a census-designated place (CDP) in Siskiyou County, California, United States. Macdoel is located on U.S. Route 97, approximately halfway between Klamath Falls, Oregon and Weed. Its population is 86 as of the 2020 census, down from 133 from the 2010 census.

== History ==
In 2021, portions of Macdoel were placed under mandatory evacuation for fourteen days due to the Tennant Fire, which burned 10,580 acres (4,282 ha) in the area.

== Geography ==
Macdoel is located at 41°49′36″N 122°0′19″W (41.826675, -122.005389).

According to the United States Census Bureau, the CDP has a total area of 0.17 square miles (0.44 km^{2}), all land.

=== Climate ===
This region experiences warm (but not hot) and dry summers, with no average monthly temperatures above 71.6 °F. According to the Köppen Climate Classification system, Macdoel has a warm-summer Mediterranean climate, abbreviated "Csb" on climate maps.

== Demographics ==
Historical population
Census	Pop.	Note	%±
2000	140		—
2010	133		−5.0%
2020	86		−35.3%
U.S. Decennial Census; 1860–1870 1880-1890; 1900 1910 1920; 1930 1940 1950; 1960 1970 1980; 1990 2000 2010

Macdoel first appeared as a census designated place in the 2000 U.S. census.

=== 2020 ===
The 2020 United States census reported that Macdoel had a population of 86. The population density was 515.0 inhabitants per square mile (198.8/km^{2}). The racial makeup of Macdoel was 34 (39.5%) White, 2 (2.3%) African American, 2 (2.3%) Native American, 2 (2.3%) Asian, 0 (0.0%) Pacific Islander, 28 (32.6%) from other races, and 18 (20.9%) from two or more races. Hispanic or Latino of any race were 53 persons (61.6%).

The whole population lived in households. There were 28 households, out of which 6 (21.4%) had children under the age of 18 living in them, 11 (39.3%) were married-couple households, 2 (7.1%) were cohabiting couple households, 8 (28.6%) had a female householder with no partner present, and 7 (25.0%) had a male householder with no partner present. 10 households (35.7%) were one person, and 6 (21.4%) were one person aged 65 or older. The average household size was 3.07. There were 15 families (53.6% of all households).

The age distribution was 29 people (33.7%) under the age of 18, 9 people (10.5%) aged 18 to 24, 16 people (18.6%) aged 25 to 44, 20 people (23.3%) aged 45 to 64, and 12 people (14.0%) who were 65 years of age or older. The median age was 34.5 years. There were 40 males and 46 females.

There were 44 housing units at an average density of 263.5 units per square mile (101.7 units/km^{2}), of which 28 (63.6%) were occupied. Of these, 24 (85.7%) were owner-occupied, and 4 (14.3%) were occupied by renters.

=== 2010 ===
At the 2010 census Macdoel had a population of 133. The population density was 897.8 inhabitants per square mile (346.6/km^{2}). The racial makeup of Macdoel was 57 (42.9%) White, 0 (0.0%) African American, 6 (4.5%) Native American, 0 (0.0%) Asian, 0 (0.0%) Pacific Islander, 69 (51.9%) from other races, and 1 (0.8%) from two or more races. Hispanic or Latino of any race were 78 people (58.6%).

The whole population lived in households, no one lived in non-institutionalized group quarters and no one was institutionalized.

There were 41 households, 19 (46.3%) had children under the age of 18 living in them, 21 (51.2%) were opposite-sex married couples living together, 4 (9.8%) had a female householder with no husband present, 4 (9.8%) had a male householder with no wife present. There were 3 (7.3%) unmarried opposite-sex partnerships, and 0 (0%) same-sex married couples or partnerships. 8 households (19.5%) were one person and 4 (9.8%) had someone living alone who was 65 or older. The average household size was 3.24. There were 29 families (70.7% of households); the average family size was 3.55.

The age distribution was 44 people (33.1%) under the age of 18, 9 people (6.8%) aged 18 to 24, 44 people (33.1%) aged 25 to 44, 24 people (18.0%) aged 45 to 64, and 12 people (9.0%) who were 65 or older. The median age was 30.6 years. For every 100 females, there were 129.3 males. For every 100 females age 18 and over, there were 128.2 males.

There were 43 housing units at an average density of 290.3 per square mile, of the occupied units 18 (43.9%) were owner-occupied and 23 (56.1%) were rented. The homeowner vacancy rate was 0%; the rental vacancy rate was 0%. 46 people (34.6% of the population) lived in owner-occupied housing units and 87 people (65.4%) lived in rental housing units.

=== 2000 ===
At the 2000 census, the median household income was $23,750 and the median family income was $27,500. Males had a median income of $15,625 versus $16,250 for females. The per capita income for the CDP was $8,244. There were 18.8% of families and 20.2% of the population living below the poverty line, including 17.0% of under eighteens and none of those over 64.

== Politics ==
In the state legislature Macdoel is in the 1st senatorial district, represented by Republican Megan Dahle, and the 1st Assembly district, represented by Republican Heather Hadwick.

Federally, Macdoel is in California's 1st congressional district, represented by Republican James Gallagher.

== See also ==
- Archeological Site 4-SK-4
