= Dorris, California =

City in California, United States

- City
- City of Dorris
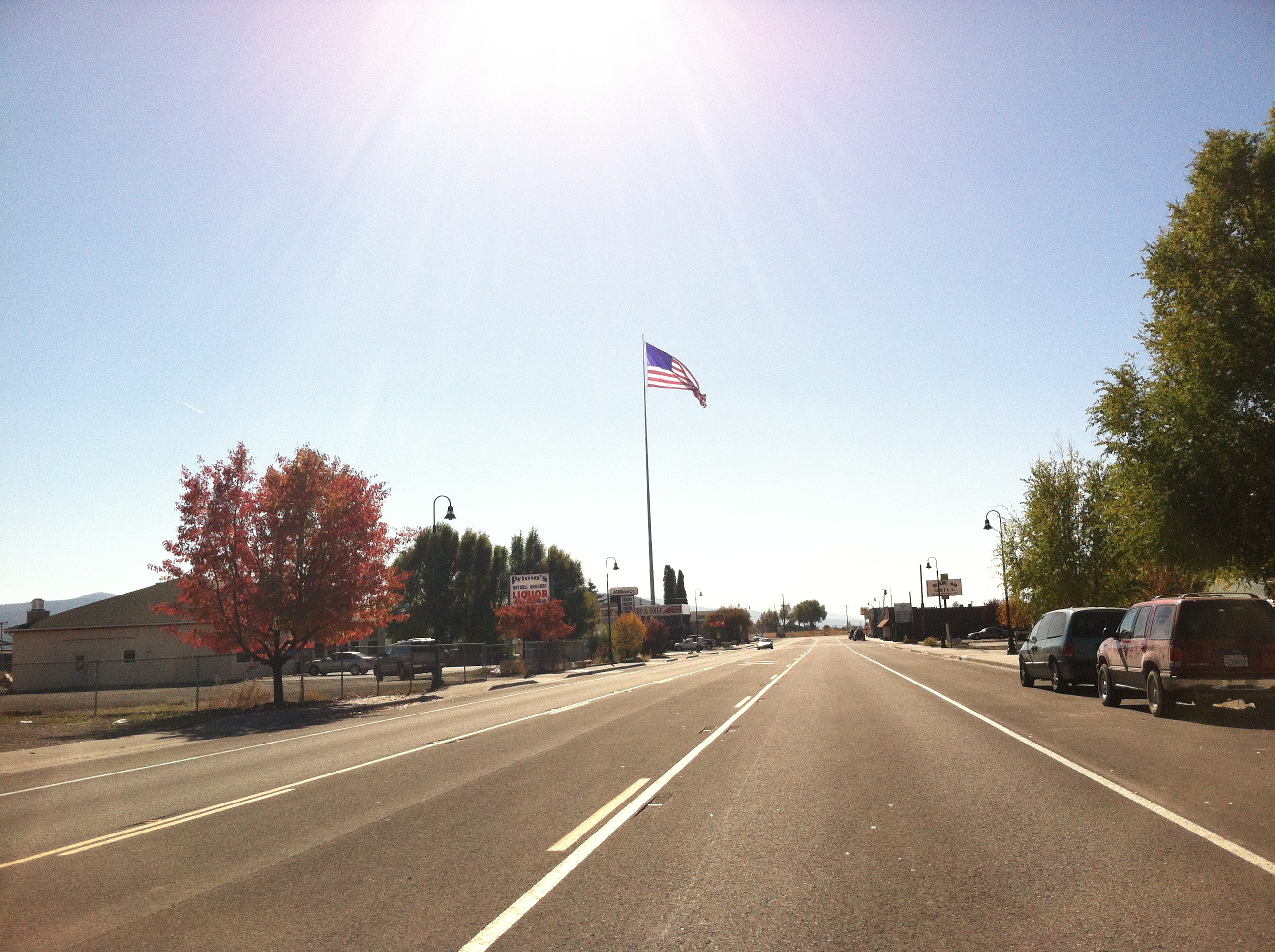
- U.S. Route 97 through downtown Dorris

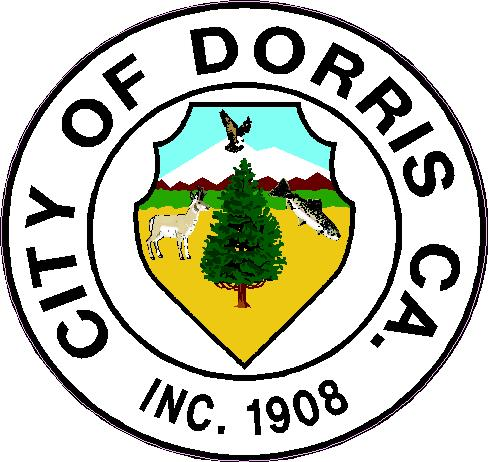
- Seal
- Interactive map of Dorris, California
- Location in the United States
- Coordinates: 41°57′54″N 121°55′8″W
- Country: United States
- State: California
- County: Siskiyou
- Incorporated: December 23, 1908

Area
  - Total: 0.72 sq mi (1.86 km^{2})
  - Land: 0.70 sq mi (1.82 km^{2})
  - Water: 0.015 sq mi (0.04 km^{2}) 2.19%
- Elevation: 4,245 ft (1,294 m)

Population (2020)
  - Total: 860
  - Density: 1,224.3/sq mi (472.69/km^{2})
- Time zone: UTC-8 (Pacific (PST))
  - Summer (DST): UTC-7 (PDT)
- ZIP code: 96023
- Area code: 530
- FIPS code: 06-19584
- GNIS feature ID: 277500
- Website: www.dorrisca.us

Dorris is a city in Siskiyou County, California, United States. Its population was 860 as of the 2020 census, down from 939 in the 2010 census. The only attractions are the flagpole and county library. The most notable people who have been residents of Dorris are two athletes who were born here.

== Geography ==
Dorris is located at 41°57′54″N 121°55′8″W (41.965075, −121.918967). It is located in the Butte Valley of northern California between Mount Shasta and the Oregon border on U.S. Route 97. According to the United States Census Bureau, the city has a total area of 0.7 square miles (1.8 km^{2}), of which 97.81% is land and 2.19% is water.

== History ==
The town was named in 1907 by the Southern Pacific Railroad for brothers Presley A. and Carlos J. Dorris who raised stock in Little Shasta in the 1860s before moving to Dorris' Bridge on the Pit River, renamed Alturas, California in 1876.

== Demographics ==
Historical population
Census	Pop.	Note	%±
1910	214		—
1920	424		98.1%
1930	762		79.7%
1940	863		13.3%
1950	892		3.4%
1960	973		9.1%
1970	840		−13.7%
1980	836		−0.5%
1990	892		6.7%
2000	886		−0.7%
2010	939		6.0%
2020	860		−8.4%
U.S. Decennial Census

=== 2020 ===
The 2020 United States census reported that Dorris had a population of 860. The population density was 1,225.1 inhabitants per square mile (473.0/km^{2}). The racial makeup of Dorris was 495 (57.6%) White, 3 (0.3%) African American, 15 (1.7%) Native American, 18 (2.1%) Asian, 0 (0.0%) Pacific Islander, 182 (21.2%) from other races, and 147 (17.1%) from two or more races. Hispanic or Latino of any race were 339 persons (39.4%).

The whole population lived in households. There were 318 households, out of which 109 (34.3%) had children under the age of 18 living in them, 139 (43.7%) were married-couple households, 26 (8.2%) were cohabiting couple households, 90 (28.3%) had a female householder with no partner present, and 63 (19.8%) had a male householder with no partner present. 81 households (25.5%) were one person, and 43 (13.5%) were one person aged 65 or older. The average household size was 2.7. There were 207 families (65.1% of all households).

The age distribution was 236 people (27.4%) under the age of 18, 57 people (6.6%) aged 18 to 24, 208 people (24.2%) aged 25 to 44, 206 people (24.0%) aged 45 to 64, and 153 people (17.8%) who were 65 years of age or older. The median age was 36.9 years. For every 100 females, there were 100.9 males.

There were 365 housing units at an average density of 519.9 units per square mile (200.7 units/km^{2}), of which 318 (87.1%) were occupied. Of these, 203 (63.8%) were owner-occupied, and 115 (36.2%) were occupied by renters.

=== 2010 ===
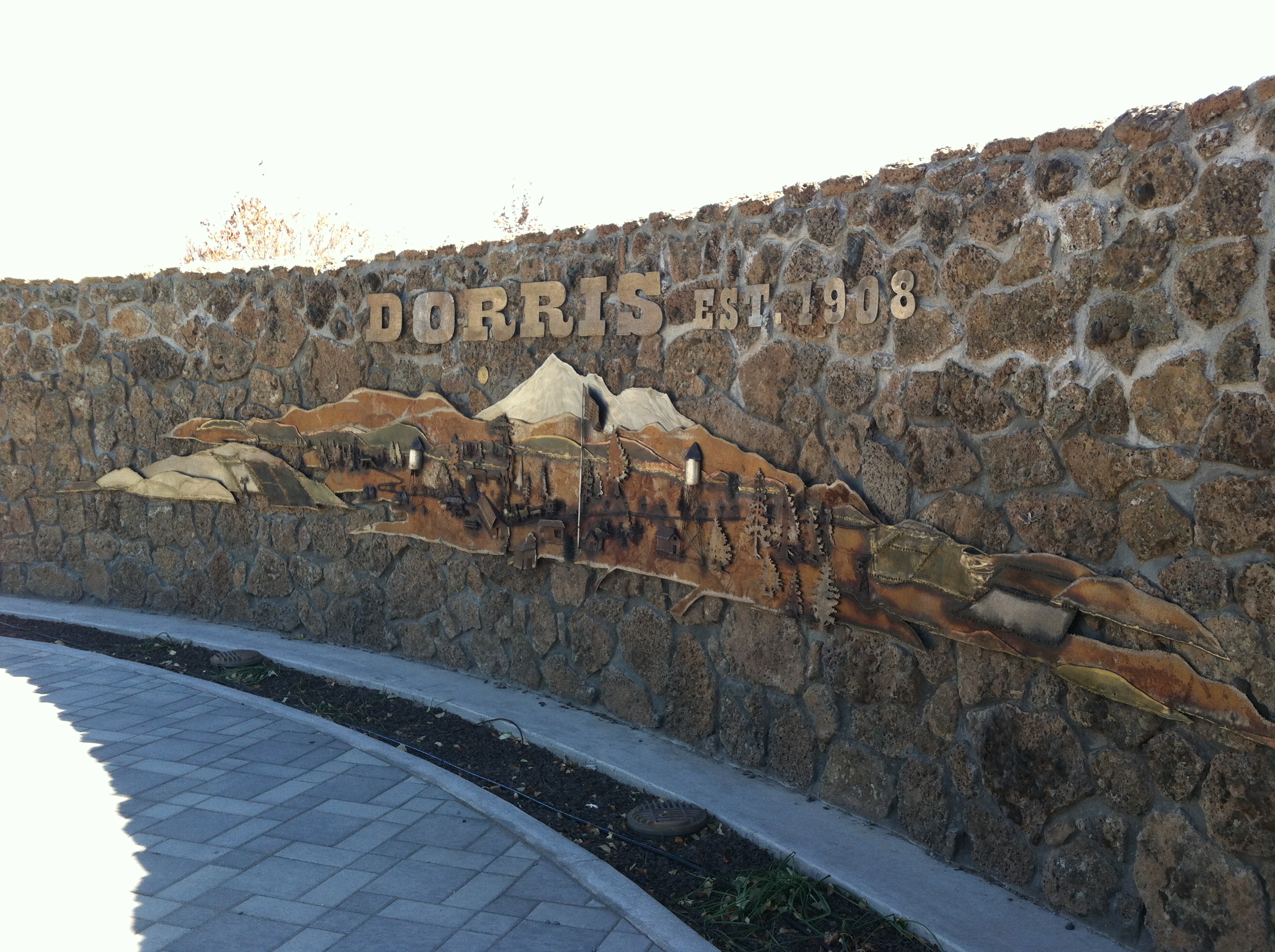
Mural on the Fire Department campus in Dorris.

At the 2010 census, Dorris had a population of 939. The population density was 1,307.5 inhabitants per square mile (504.8/km^{2}). The racial makeup was 764 (81.4%) White, 19 (2.0%) African American, 18 (1.9%) Native American, 5 (0.5%) Asian, 8 (0.9%) Pacific Islander, 77 (8.2%) from other races, and 48 (5.1%) from two or more races. Hispanic or Latino of any race numbered 197 people (21.0%).

The entire population lived in households; no one lived in non-institutionalized group quarters or was institutionalized.

There were 364 households, 125 (34.3%) had children under the age of 18 living in them, 171 (47.0%) were opposite-sex married couples living together, 47 (12.9%) had a female householder with no husband present, 23 (6.3%) had a male householder with no wife present. There were 33 (9.1%) unmarried opposite-sex partnerships, and 1 (0.3%) same-sex married couples or partnerships. 106 households (29.1%) were one person and 44 (12.1%) had someone living alone who was 65 or older. The average household size was 2.58. There were 241 families (66.2% of households); the average family size was 3.15.

The age distribution was 240 people (25.6%) under the age of 18, 91 people (9.7%) aged 18 to 24, 216 people (23.0%) aged 25 to 44, 256 people (27.3%) aged 45 to 64, and 136 people (14.5%) who were 65 or older. The median age was 38.2 years. For every 100 females, there were 102.4 males. For every 100 females age 18 and over, there were 94.2 males.

There were 414 housing units at an average density of 576.5 per square mile. 248 (68.1%) of the occupied units were owner-occupied and 116 (31.9%) were rented. The homeowner vacancy rate was 3.9%; the rental vacancy rate was 7.2%. 584 people (62.2% of the population) lived in owner-occupied housing units and 355 people (37.8%) lived in rental housing units.

== Local attractions ==
Notable locations in town include the Dorris Branch of the Siskiyou County Public Library, Dorris City Hall, Dorris Fire Department, two schools, the Siskiyou County Dorris-Tulelake Branch Courts and the Butte Valley Museum. Dorris is home to what was once the country's tallest flagpole west of the Mississippi, and still the tallest west of the Rockies. It is 200 feet (61 m) tall, and flies a flag 30 feet (9.1 m) tall by 60 feet (18 m) wide. It was surpassed in 2002 by a 300-foot pole in Laredo, Texas and in 2014 by a 400-foot pole in Sheboygan, Wisconsin.

== Infrastructure ==
U.S. Highway 97 is a major north–south United States highway and divides Dorris from southeast to northwest. California State Route 161 joins Highway 97 just north of Dorris.

The Butte Valley Airport (FAA LID: A32, formerly CA03) is a county-owned public-use airport located 5 miles (8.0 km) southwest of the central business district of Dorris.

The Butte Valley National Grassland is a 18,425-acre (7,456 ha) United States National Grassland located between Dorris and Macdoel along Highway 97.

== Education ==
The Butte Valley Unified School District administers the elementary, middle and high school in Dorris.

The Butte Valley High School Bulldogs are members of the Evergreen League, a high school sports league whose athletic teams are members of the Northern Section of the California Interscholastic Federation.

== Government ==
In the state legislature, Dorris is in the 1st senatorial district, represented by Republican Megan Dahle, and the 1st Assembly district, represented by Republican Heather Hadwick.

Federally, Dorris is in California's 1st congressional district, represented by Republican James Gallagher.

== Notable people ==
- Bernie Hughes, National Football League player was born in Dorris.
- Nelson Briles, Major League Baseball pitcher born in Dorris
