= State Scenic Highway System (California) =

Highway system of California, US

- State Scenic Highway System signage

System links
- State highways in California; Interstate; US; State; Scenic; History; Pre‑1964; Unconstructed; Deleted; Freeways

The State Scenic Highway System in the U.S. state of California is a list of highways, mainly state highways, that have been designated by the California Department of Transportation (Caltrans) as scenic highways. They are marked by the state flower, a California poppy, inside either a rectangle for state-maintained highways or a pentagon for county highways.

The California State Legislature makes state highways eligible for designation as a scenic highway, listing them in the Article 2.5 of Chapter 2 of Division 1 of the California Streets and Highways Code. For a highway to then be declared scenic by Caltrans, the local government with jurisdiction over abutting land must adopt a "scenic corridor protection program" that limits development, outdoor advertising, and earthmoving, and Caltrans must agree that it meets the criteria. The desire to create such a designation has at times been in conflict with the property rights of abutters, for example on State Route 174.

Any county highway that is believed to have outstanding scenic qualities is considered eligible, and the county with jurisdiction must follow Caltrans' same approval process as state highways to be declared scenic.

== California Historic Parkways ==
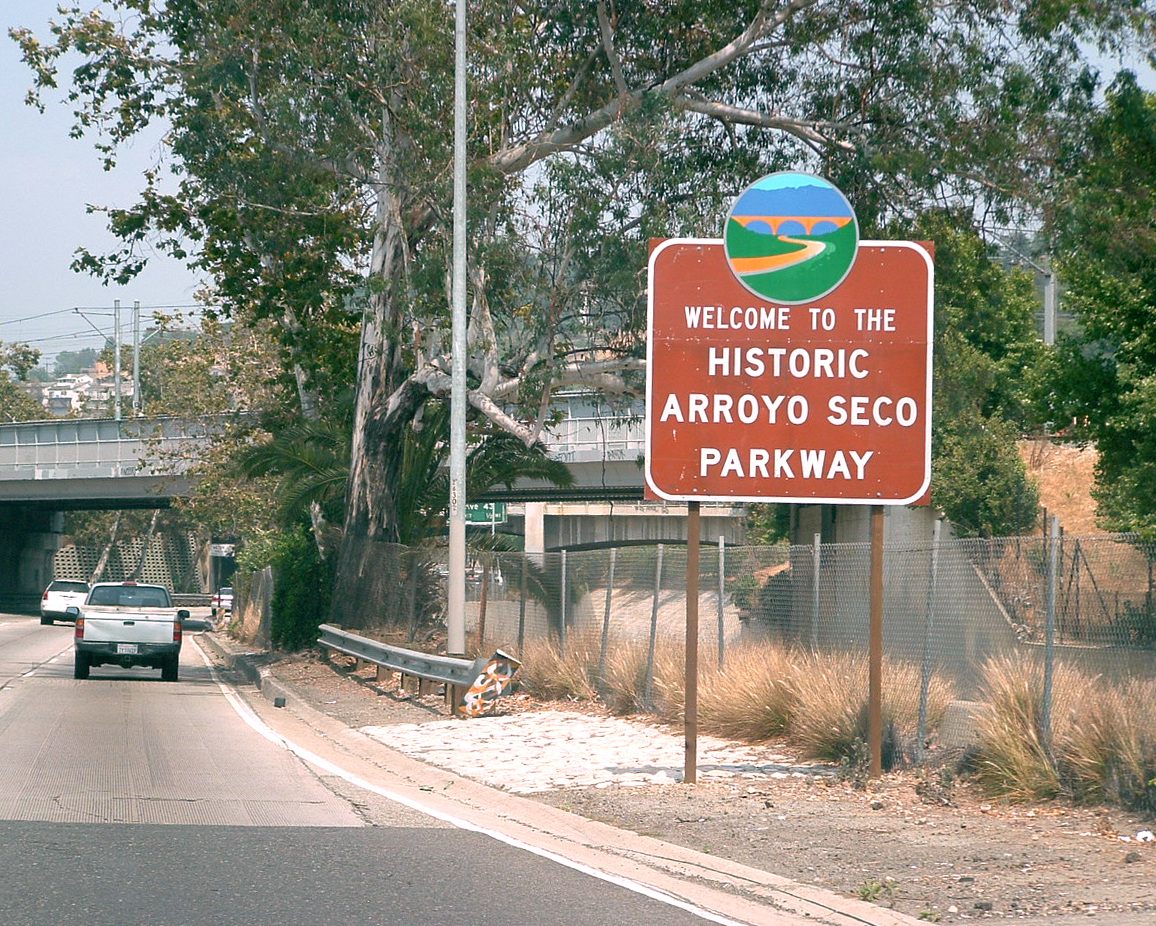
Entering the Arroyo Seco Parkway in Pasadena

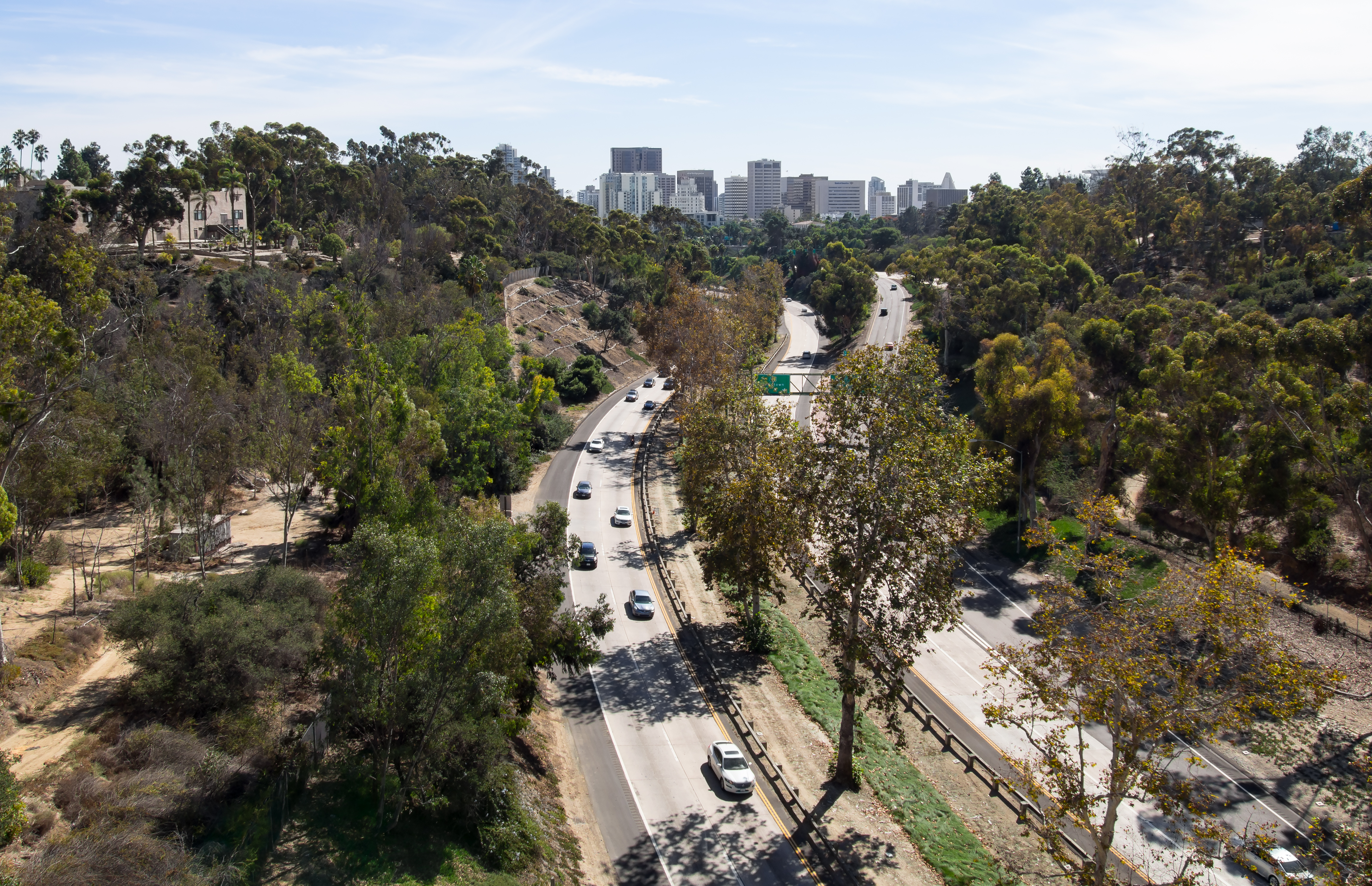
The Cabrillo Freeway, looking south from the Cabrillo Bridge in Balboa Park

California Historic Parkways are defined in the Streets and Highways Code, sections 280–284, as a subset of the State Scenic Highway System. Such historic parkways must have been constructed prior to 1945, and have been determined by either Caltrans or the Office of Historic Preservation in the California Department of Parks and Recreation to have historical significance. They must not at time of designation be traversed by more than 40,000 vehicles per day on an annual daily average basis. They also must be "bounded on one or both sides by federal, state, or local parkland, Native American lands or monuments, or other open space, greenbelt areas, natural habitat or wildlife preserves, or similar acreage used for or dedicated to historical or recreational uses".

- State Route 110
  - Arroyo Seco Parkway (also a National Scenic Byway), the first freeway in the Western U.S.
    - Designated January 1, 1994, in Los Angeles County: Figueroa Street/Avenue 26 in Los Angeles to Glenarm Street in Pasadena
- State Route 163
  - Cabrillo Parkway, historic parkway through Balboa Park in San Diego
    - Designated September 27, 2002, in San Diego County: Balboa Park

== List of eligible and designated scenic state highways ==
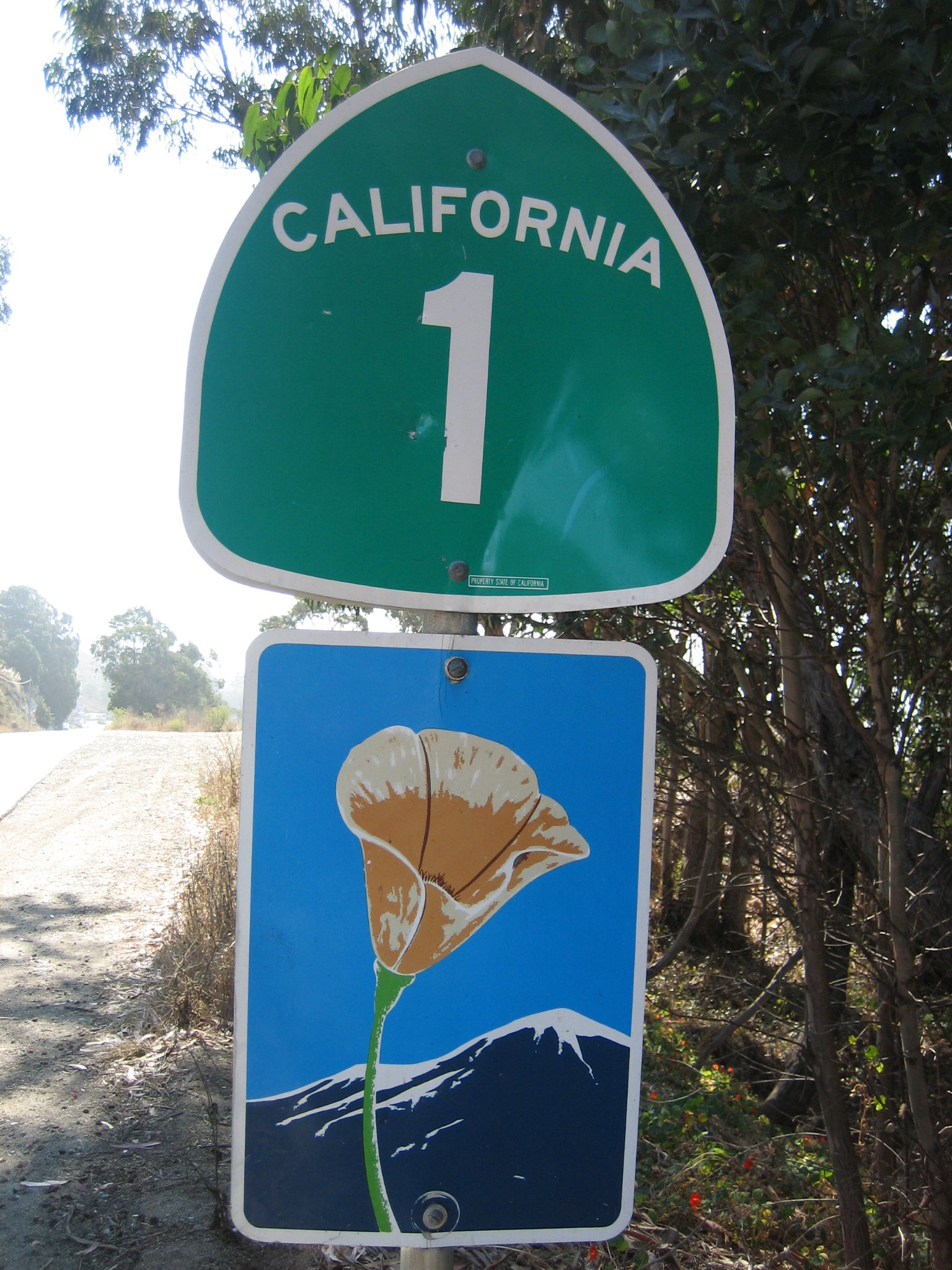
SR 1 and State Scenic Highway markers

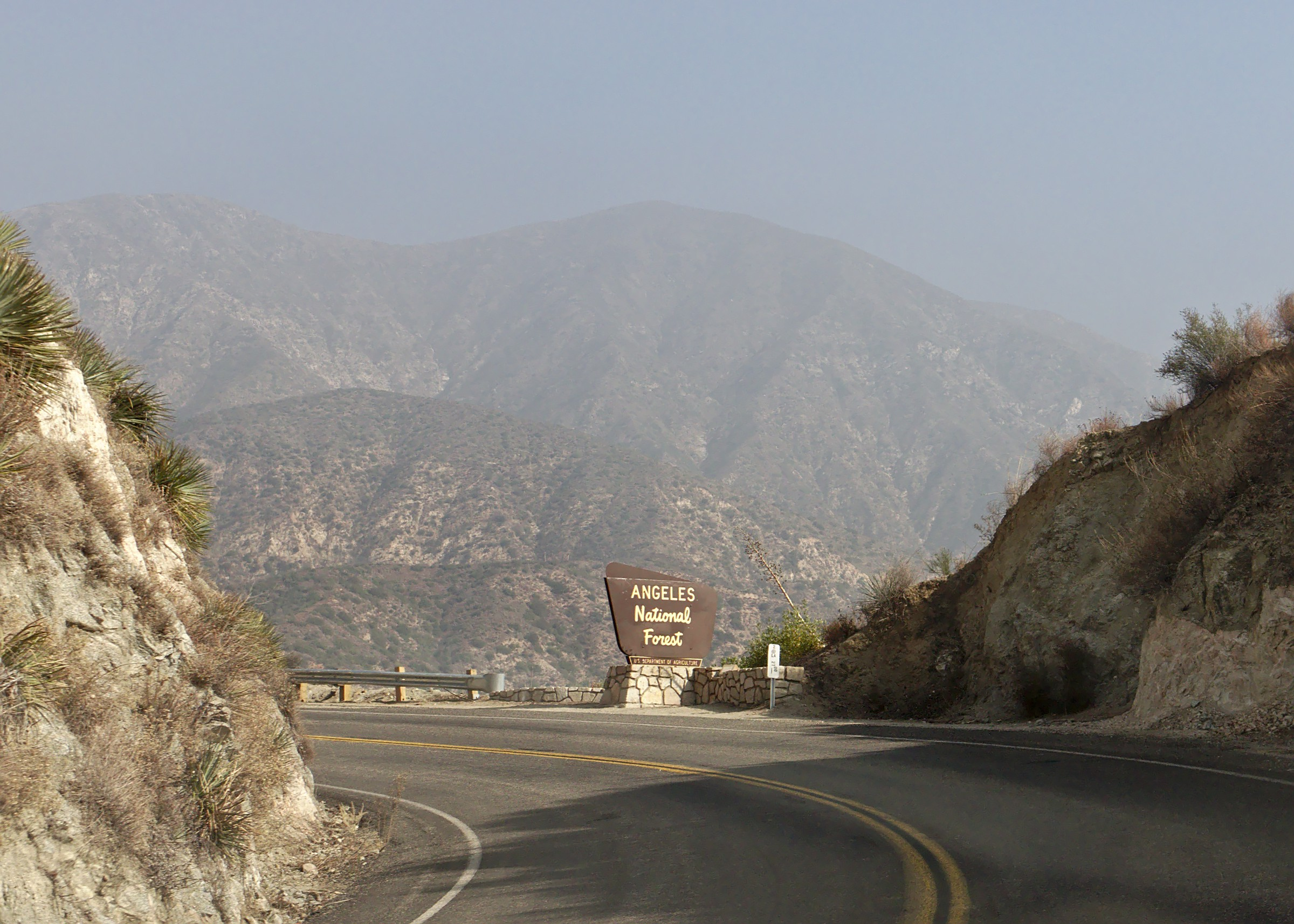
SR 2 entering Angeles National Forest from the south

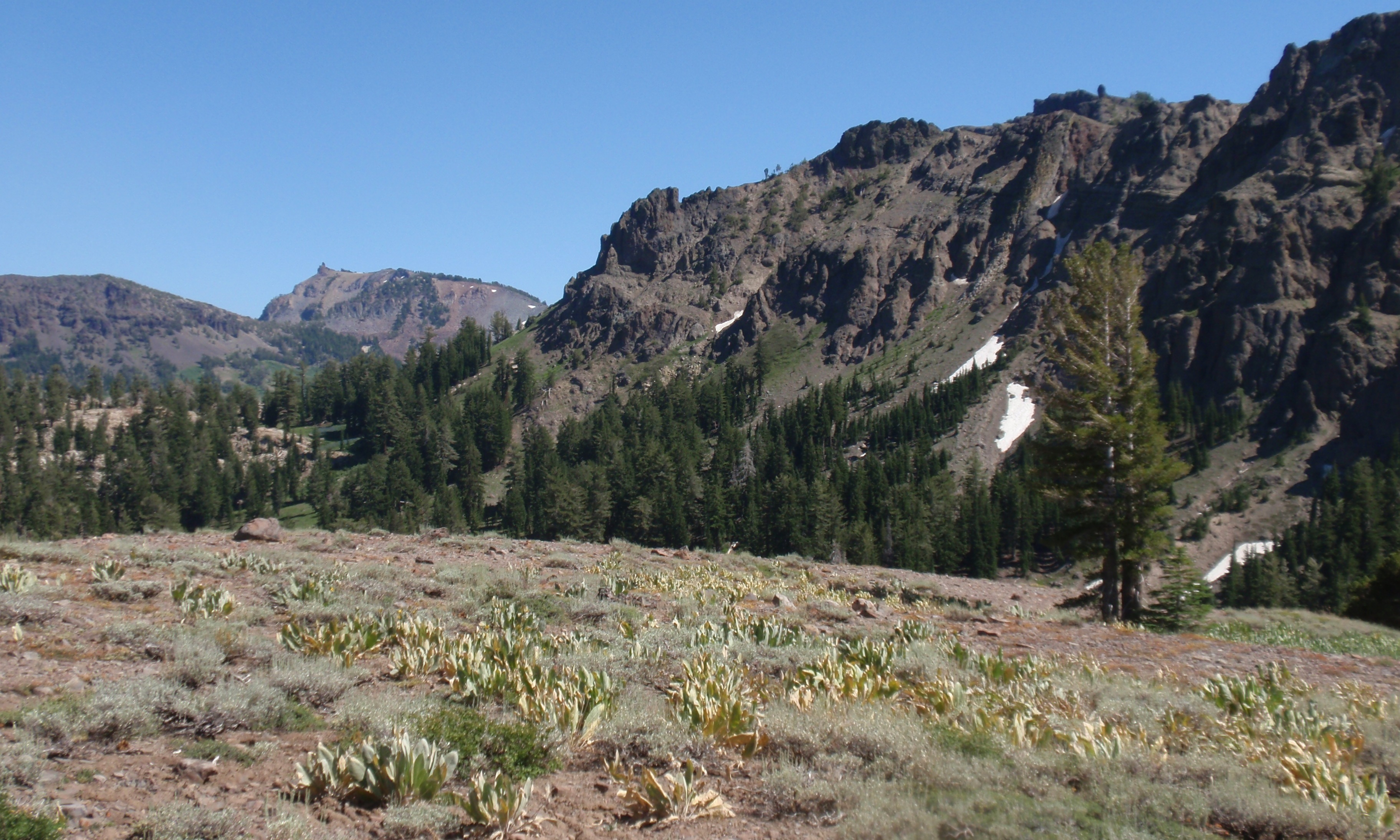
Subalpine meadow at SR 4/Ebbetts Pass

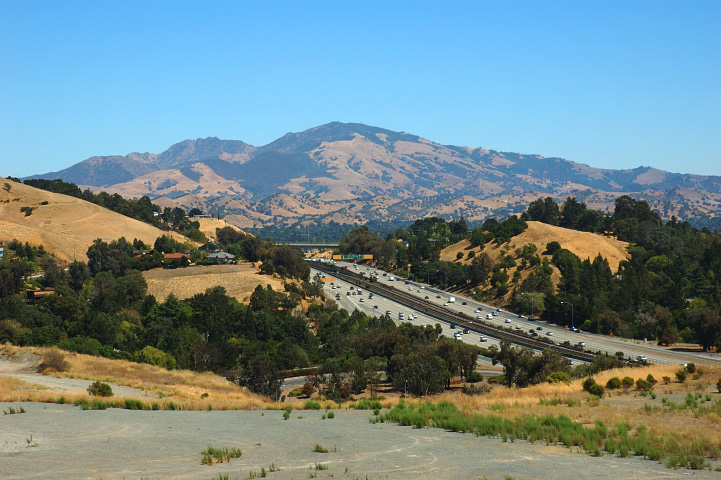
SR 24 running through Lafayette, with Mount Diablo in the distance

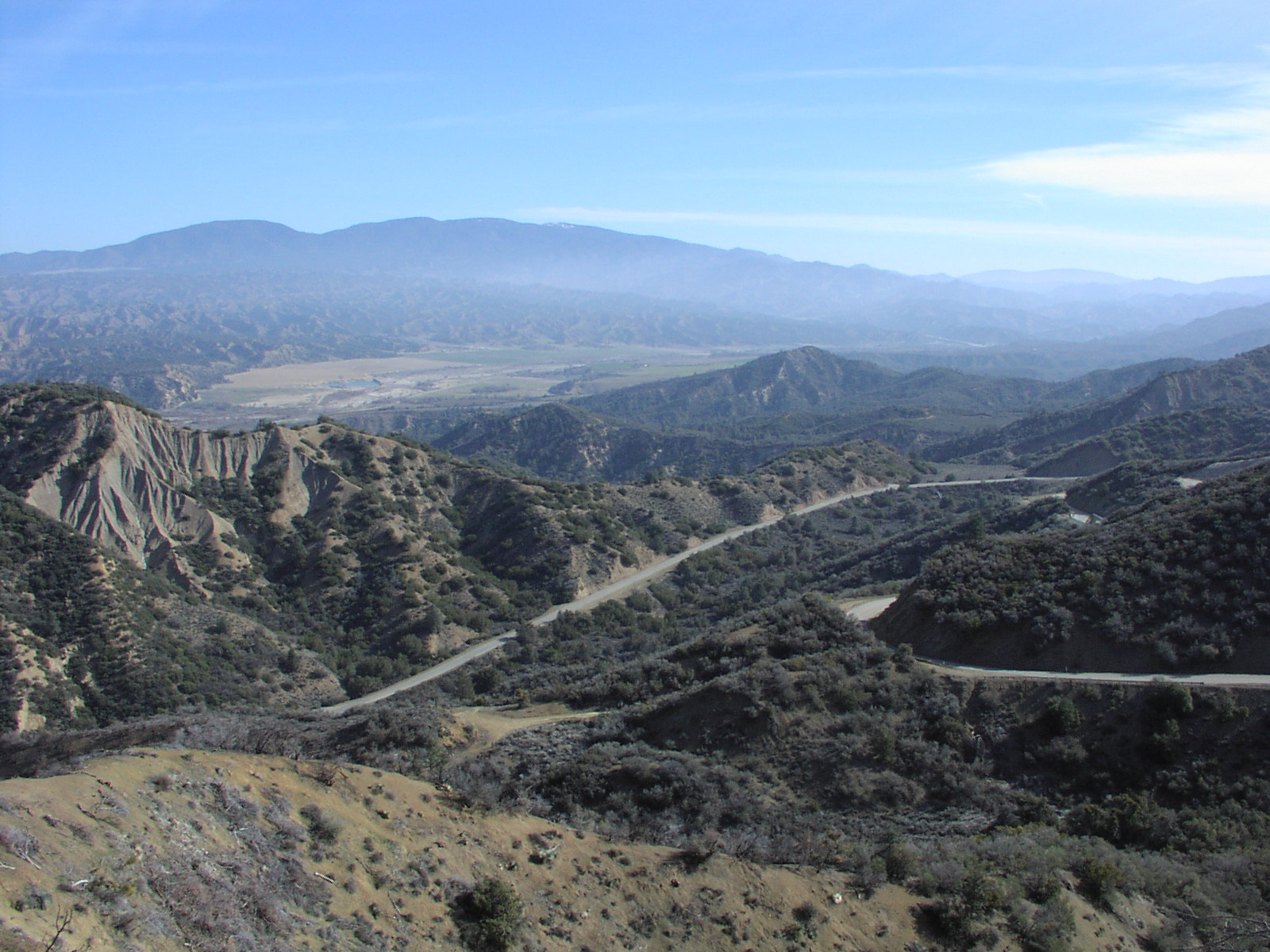
View northeast from near Pine Mountain Summit on SR 33

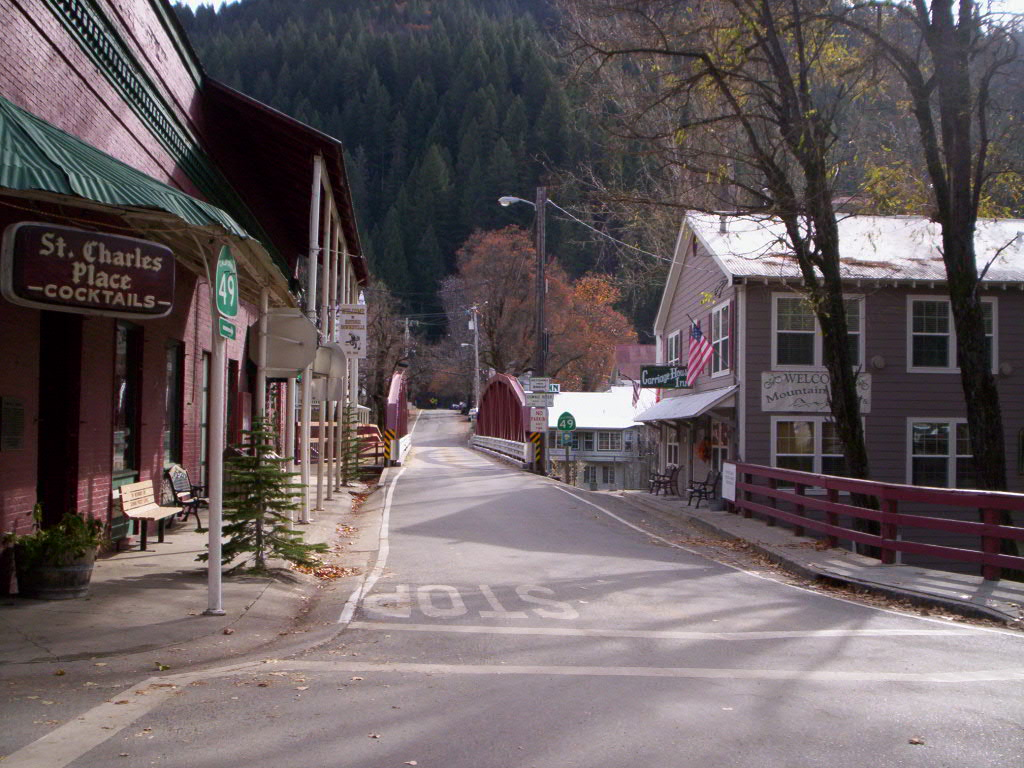
SR 49 through the historic mining community of Downieville.

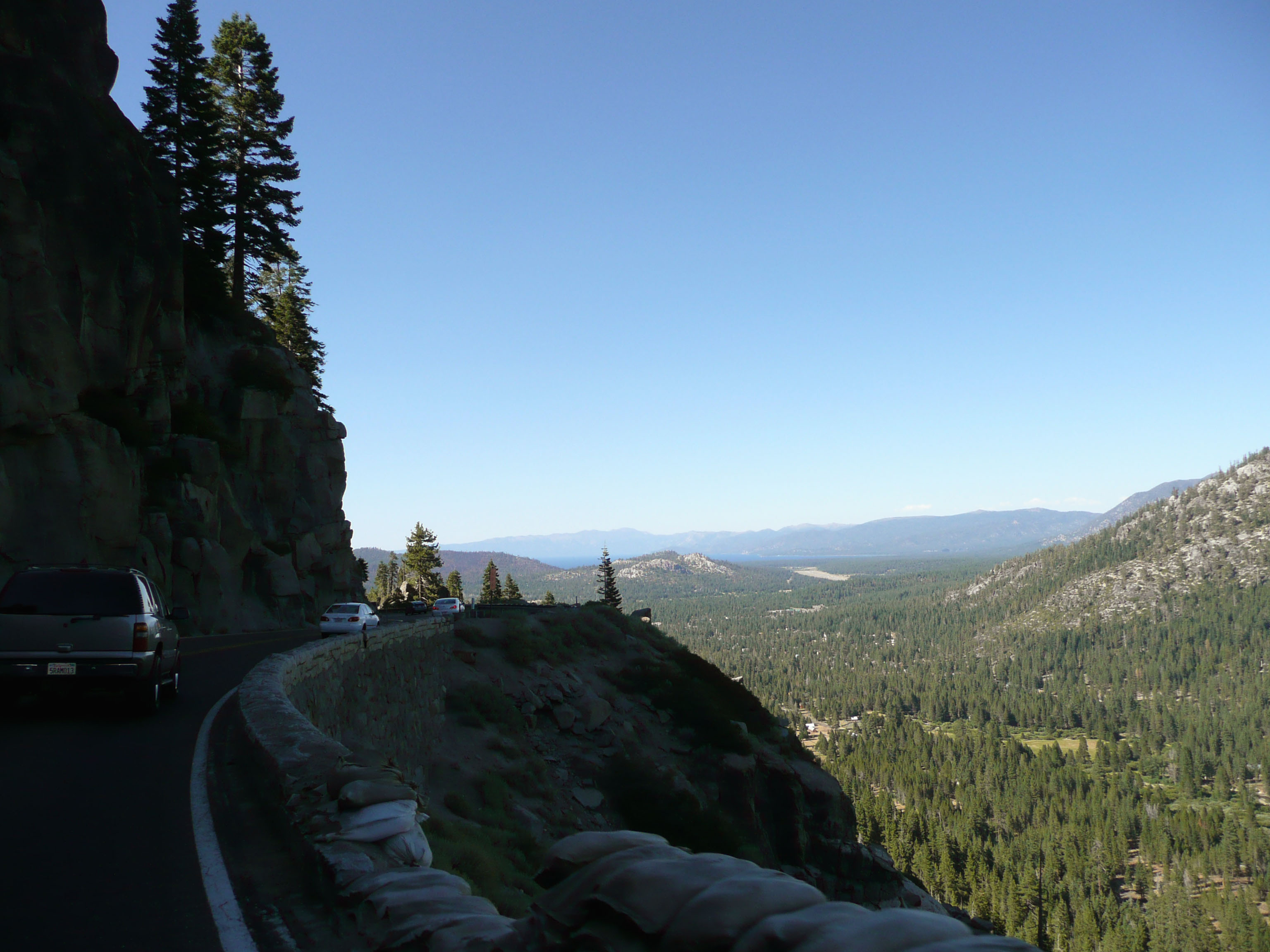
View from US 50/Echo Summit towards Lake Tahoe

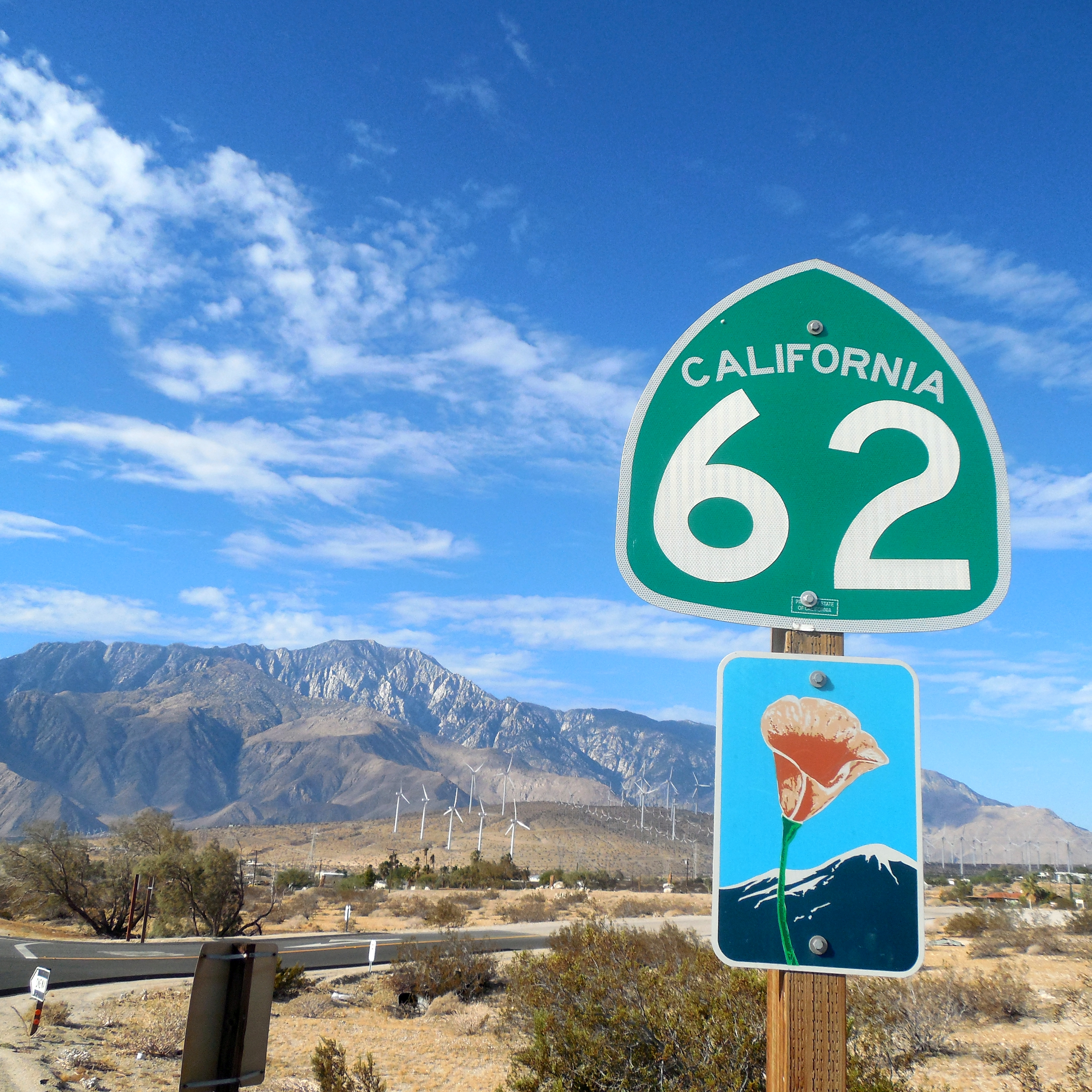
SR 62 and State Scenic Highway markers in Whitewater.

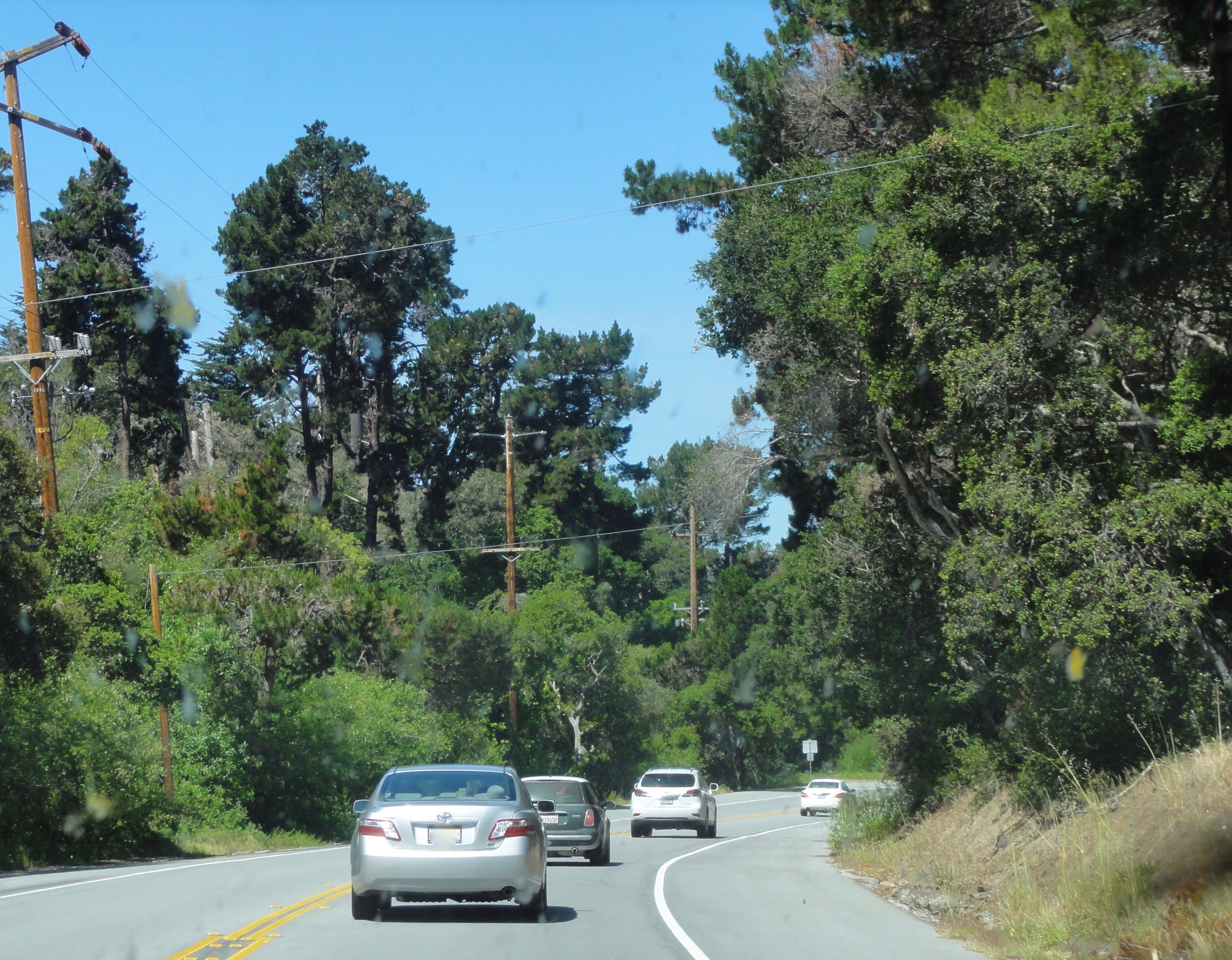
SR 68 eastbound approaching the Monterey Peninsula.

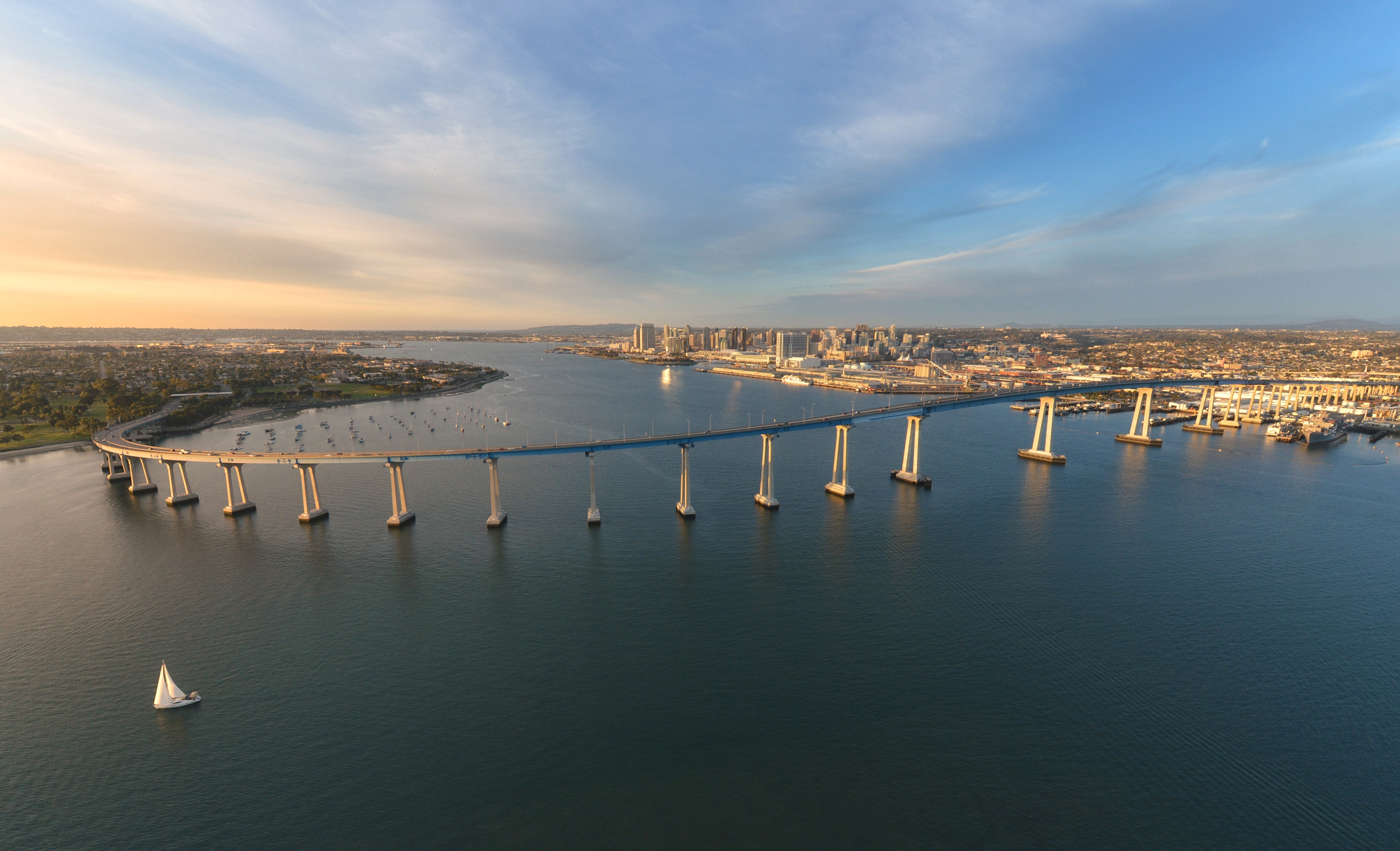
SR 75/San Diego–Coronado Bridge, 2016

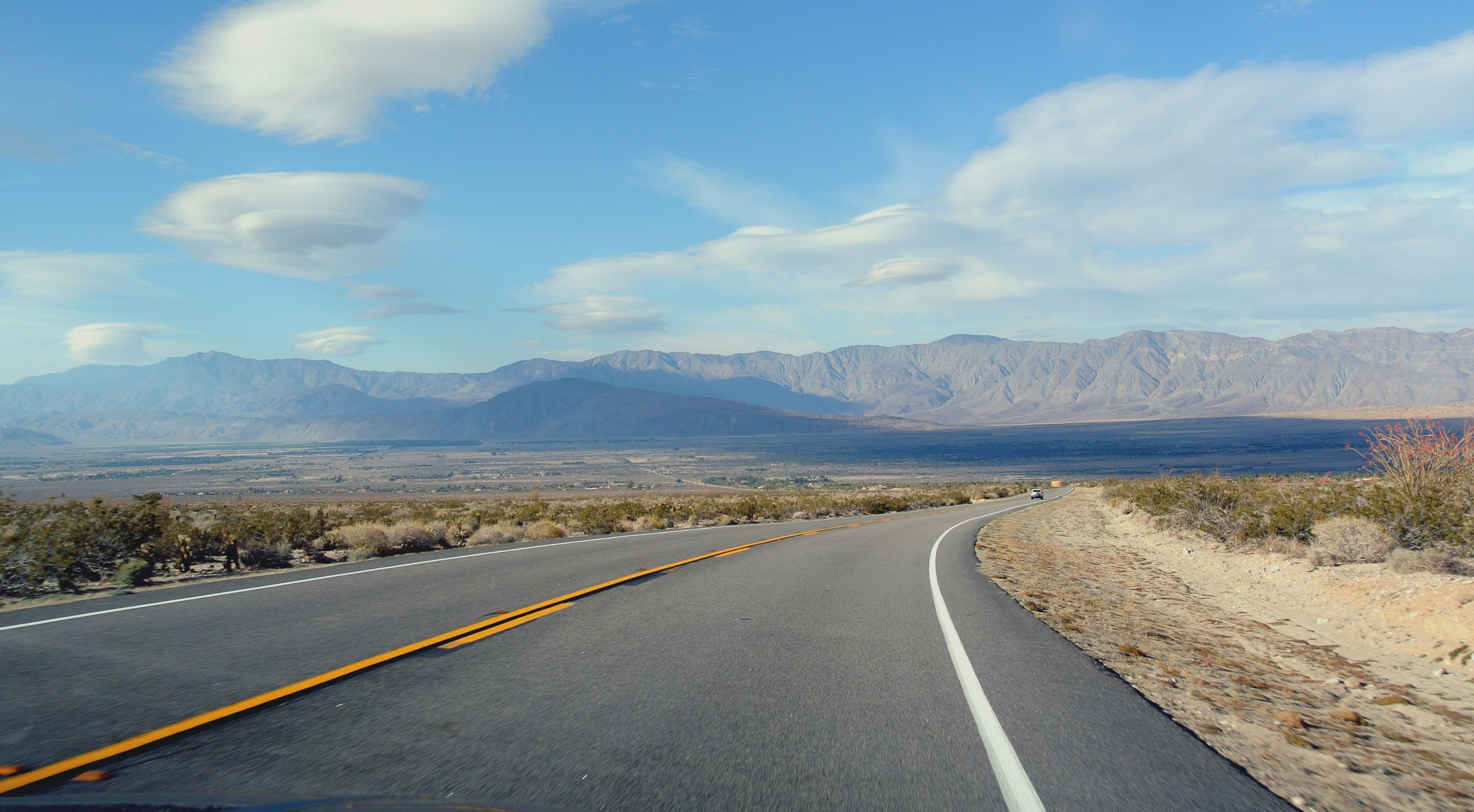
SR 78 in Anza-Borrego Desert State Park, looking east

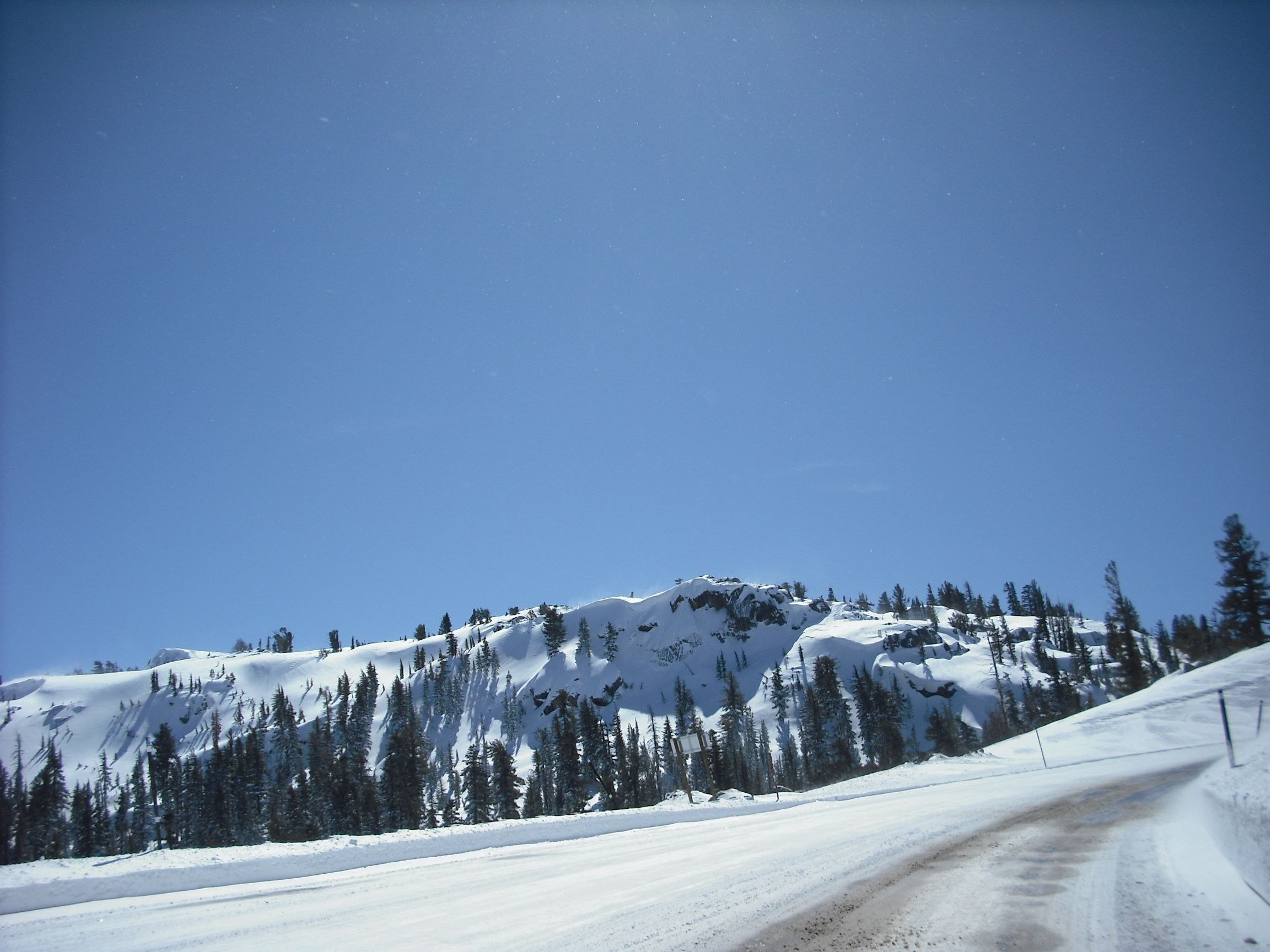
SR 88 in Alpine County near Red Lake

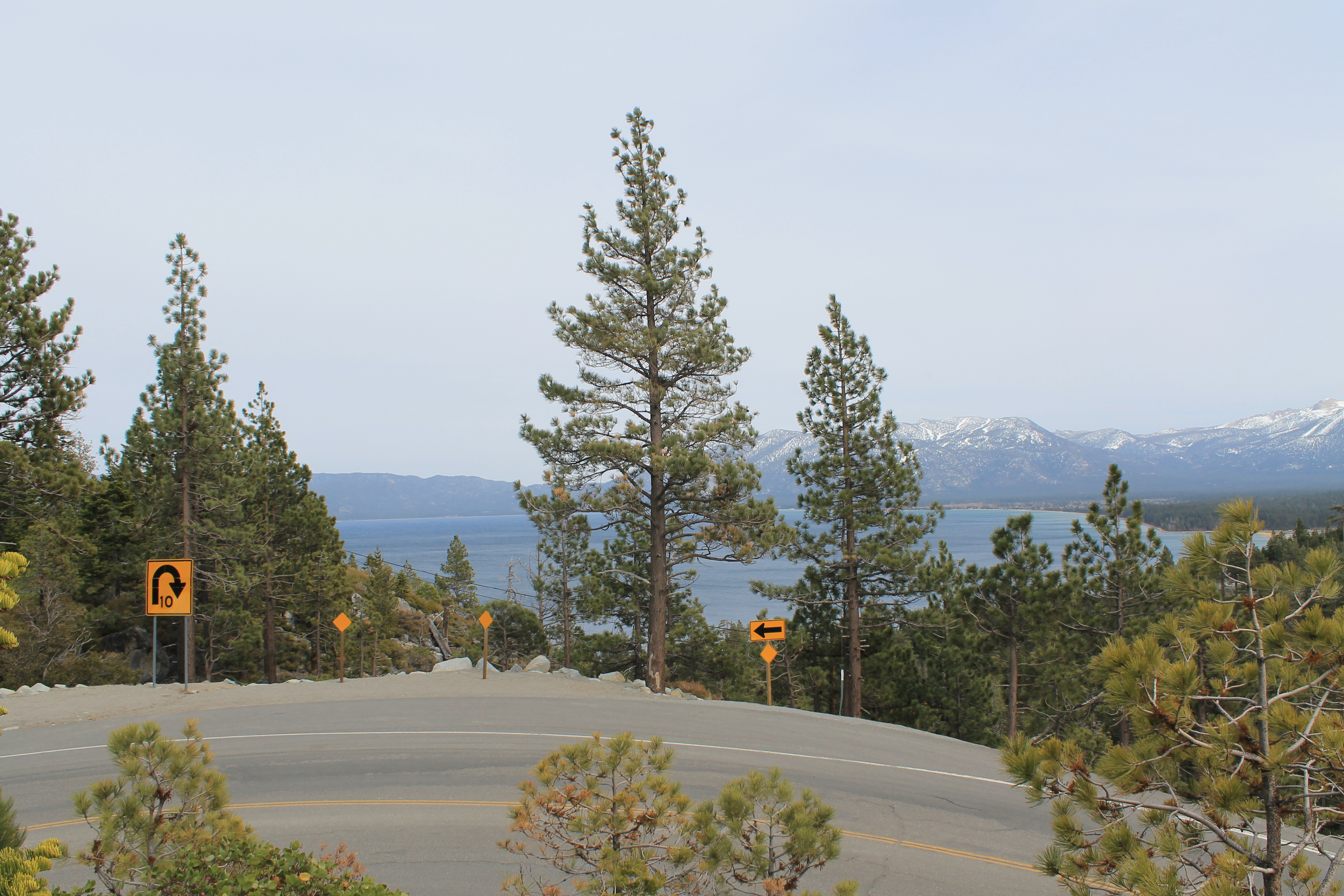
SR 89 through Emerald Bay State Park overlooking Lake Tahoe

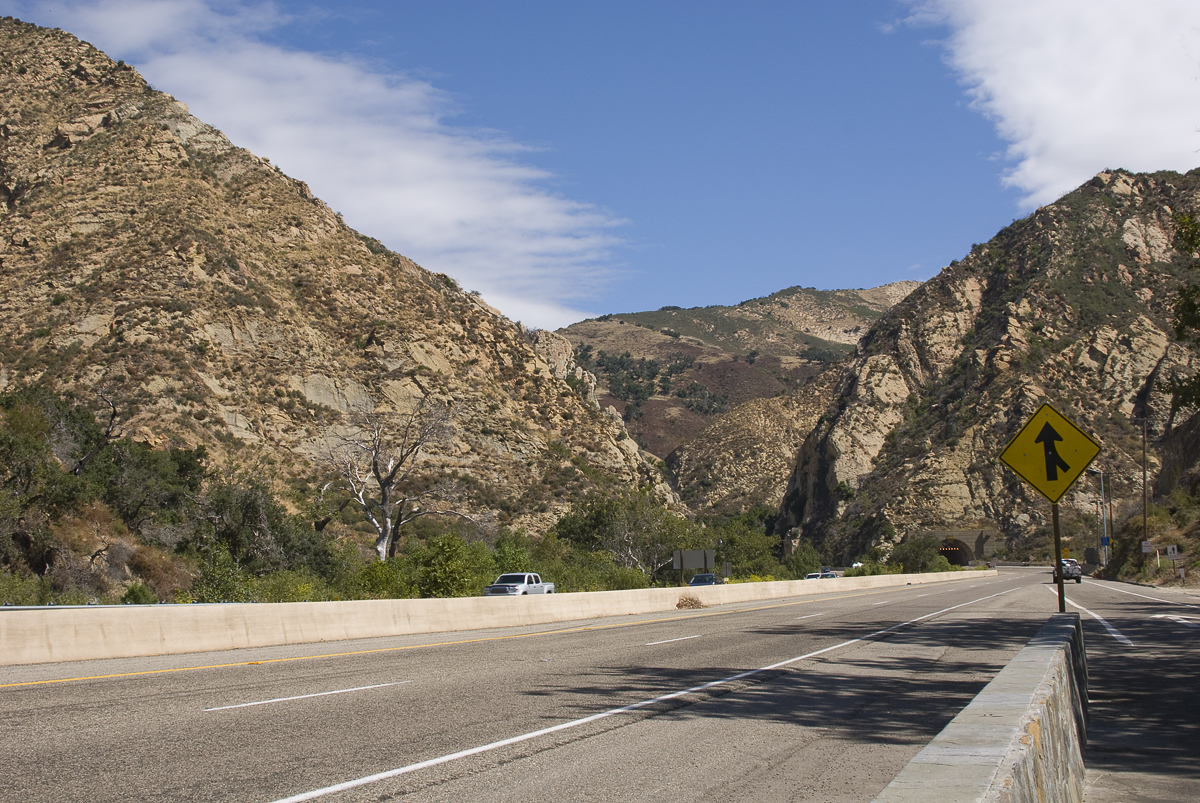
US 101 northbound near Gaviota Tunnel.

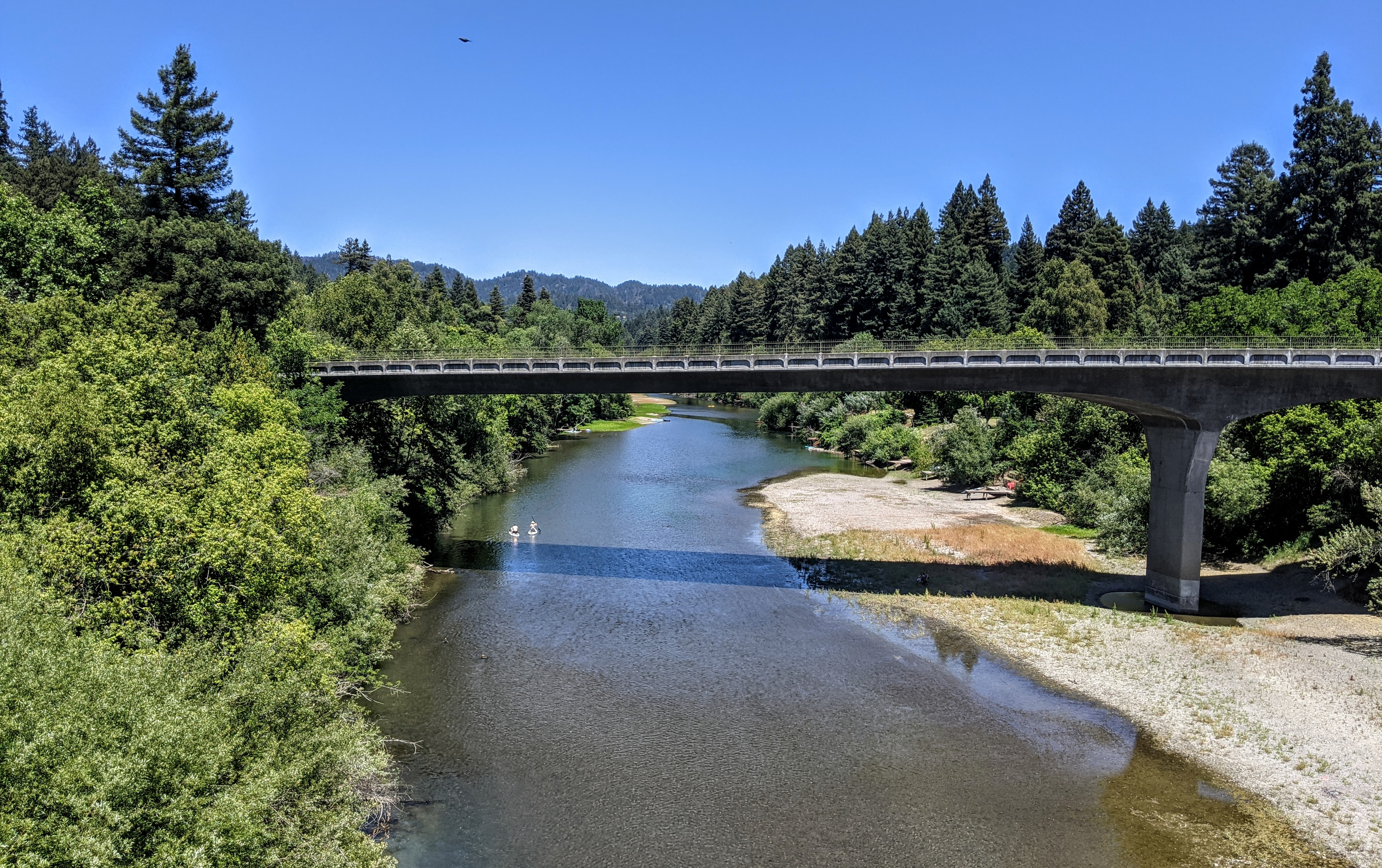
SR 116 bridge over the Russian River in Guerneville.

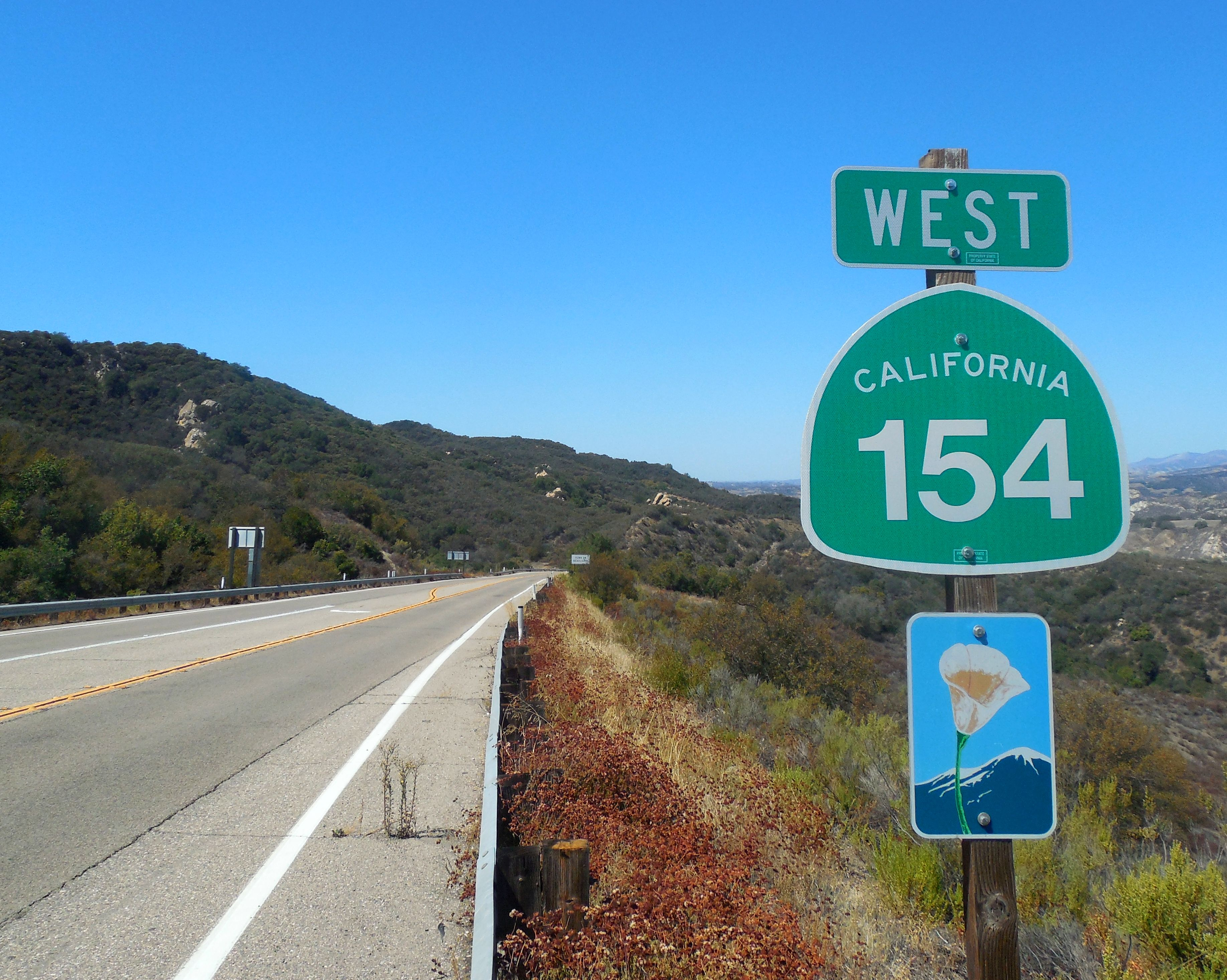
SR 154 and State Scenic Highway markers

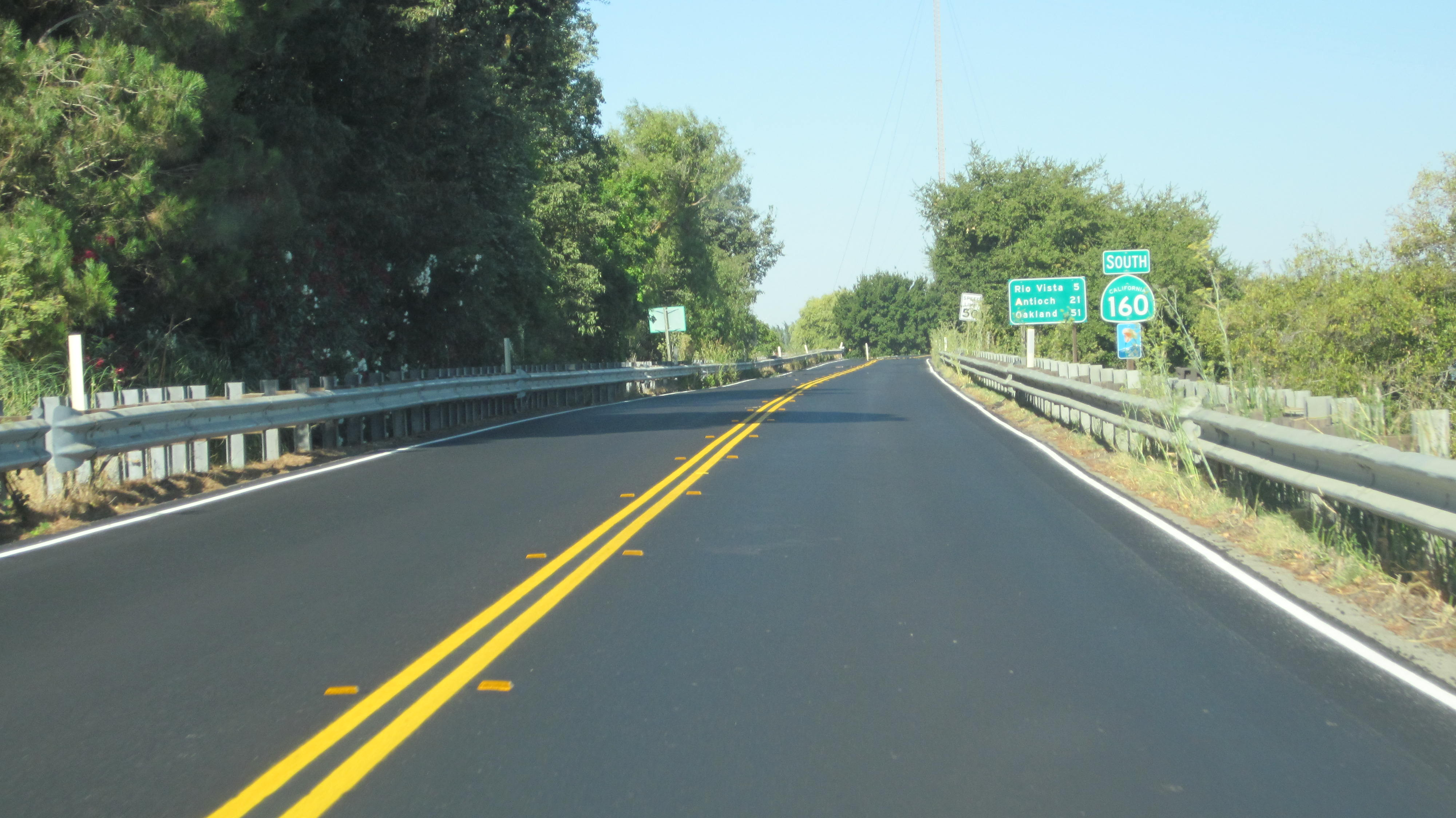
SR 160 southbound about 5 miles (8.0 km) north of Rio Vista.

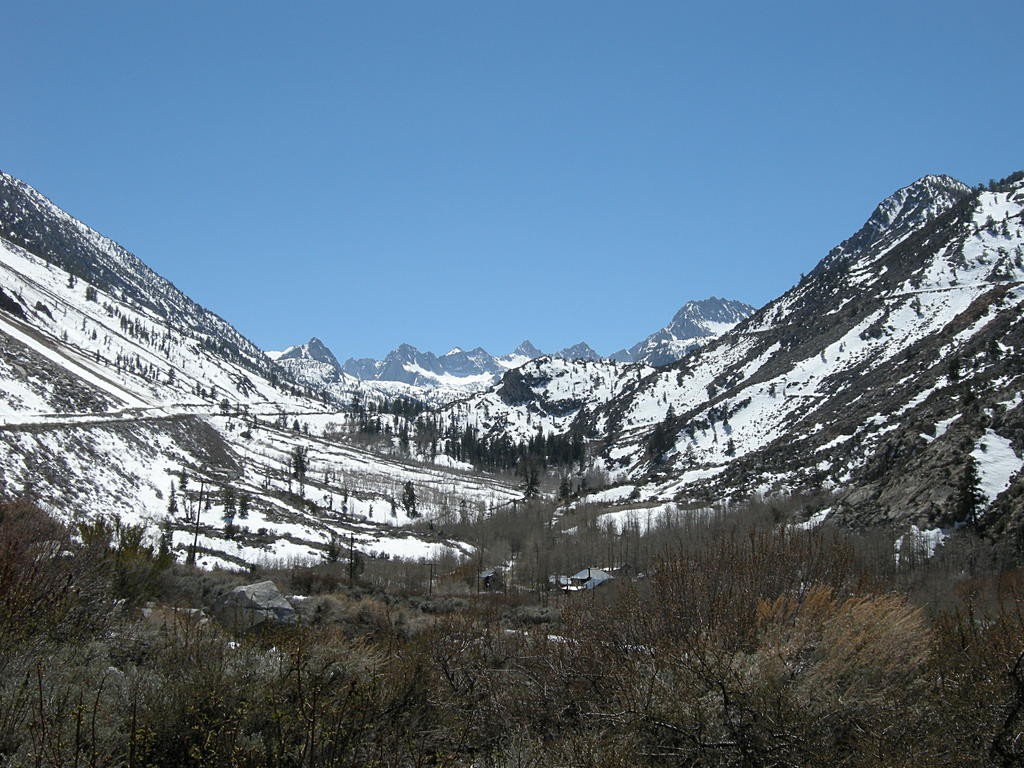
SR 168, heading up Bishop Creek.

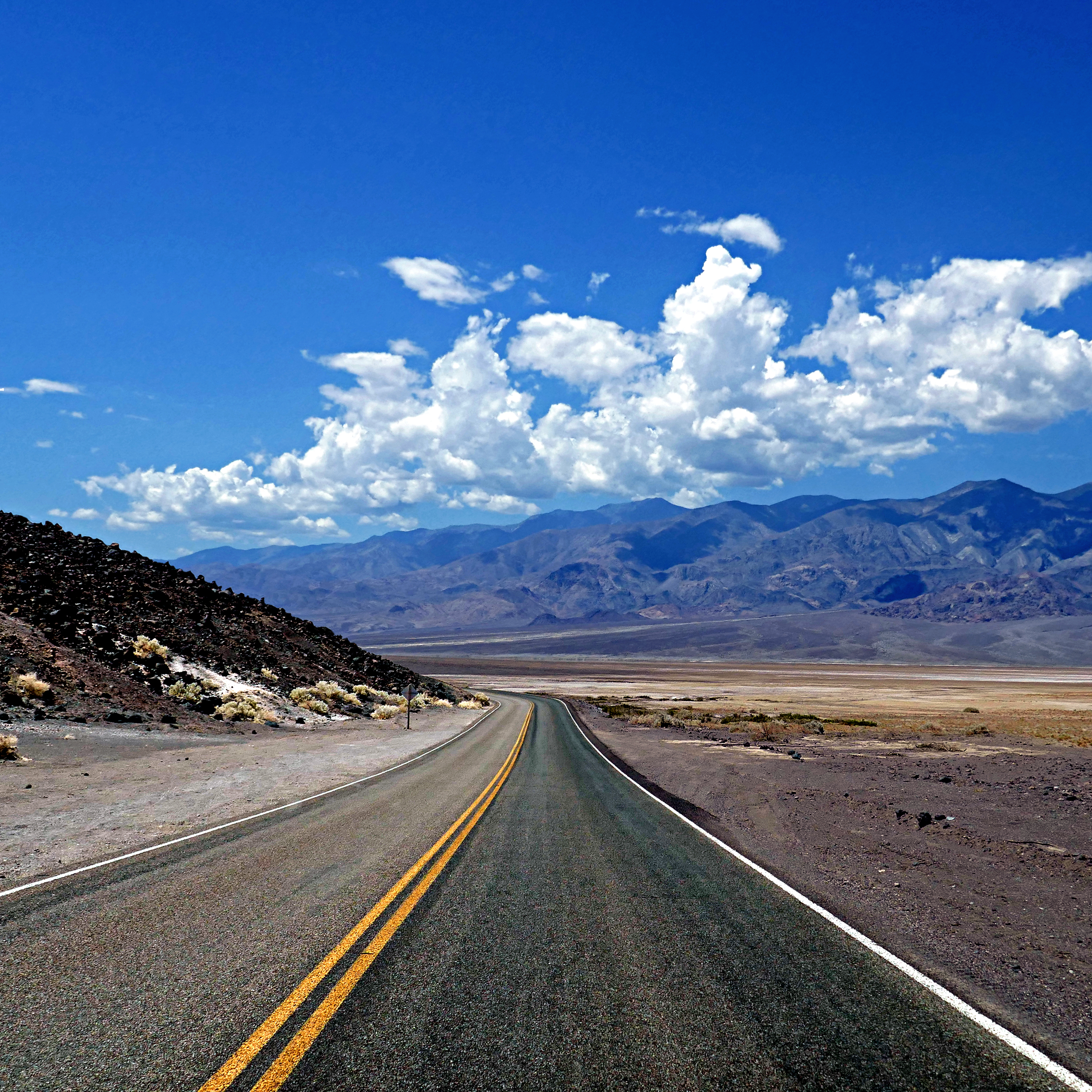
SR 190/Death Valley Scenic Byway in Death Valley National Park.

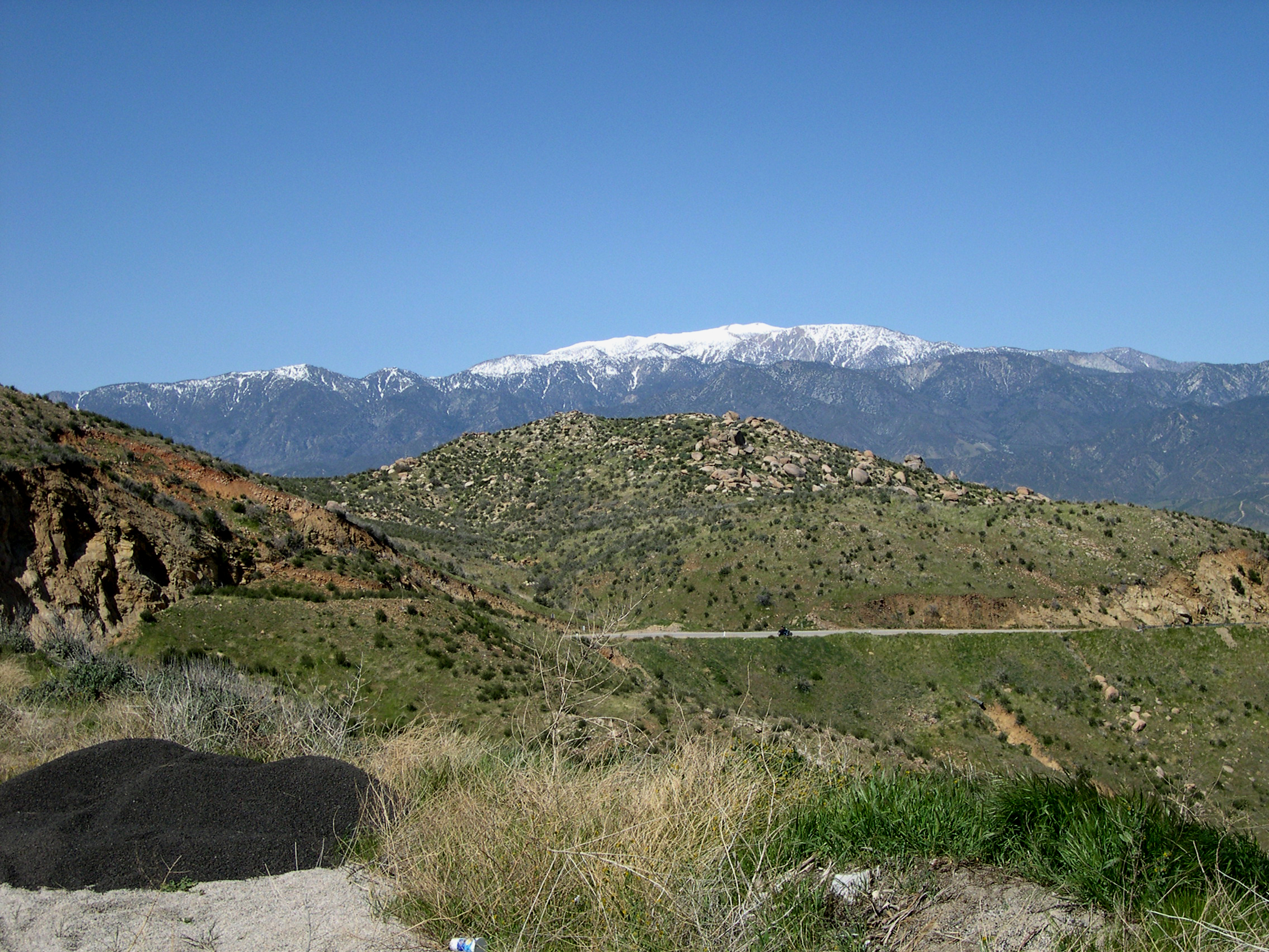
San Gorgonio Mountain seen from SR 243 near Banning.

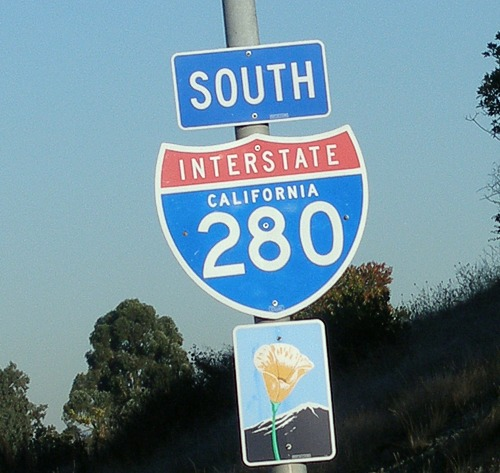
I-280 and State Scenic Highway markers

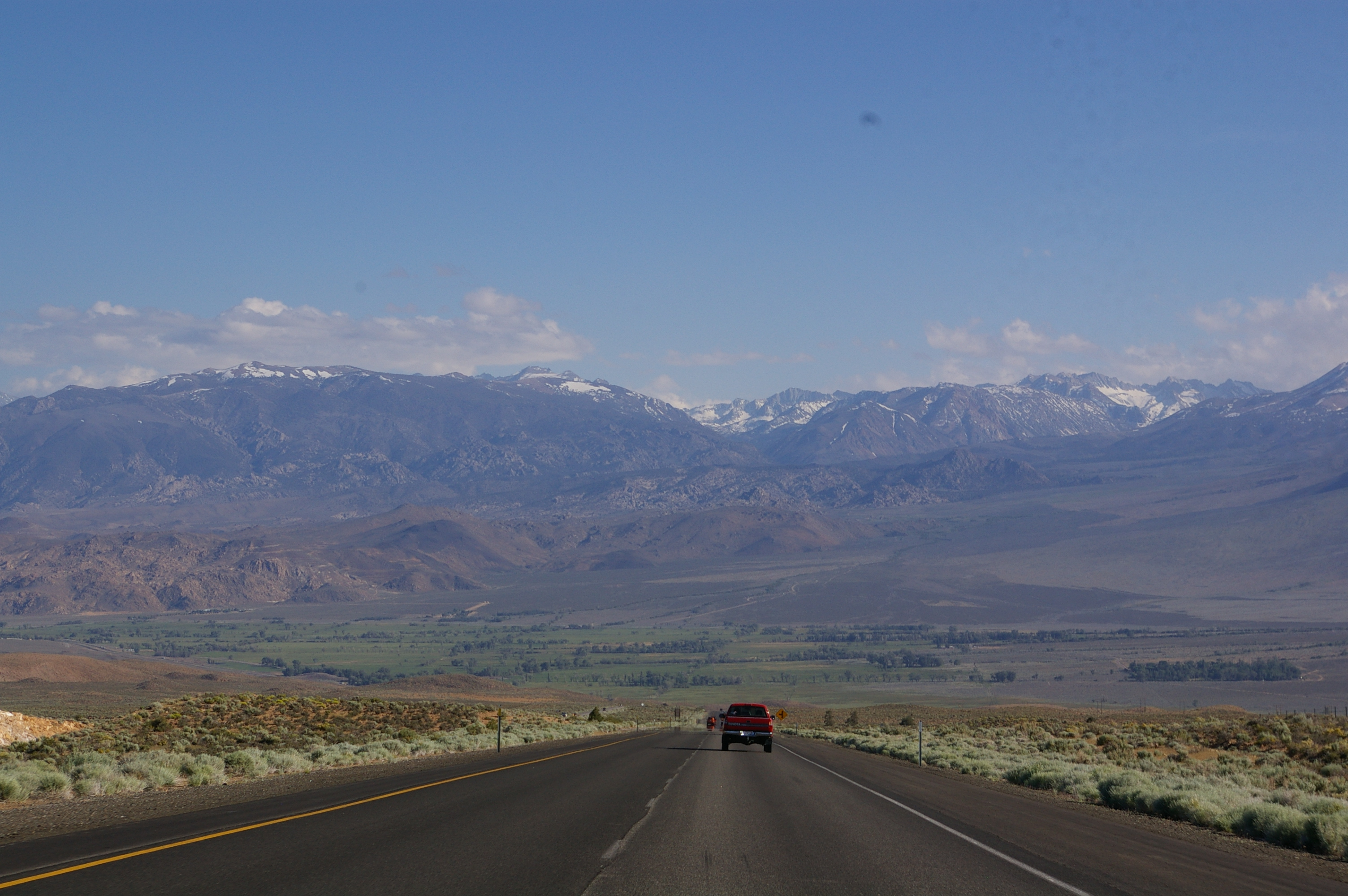
US 395 descending south into Owens Valley

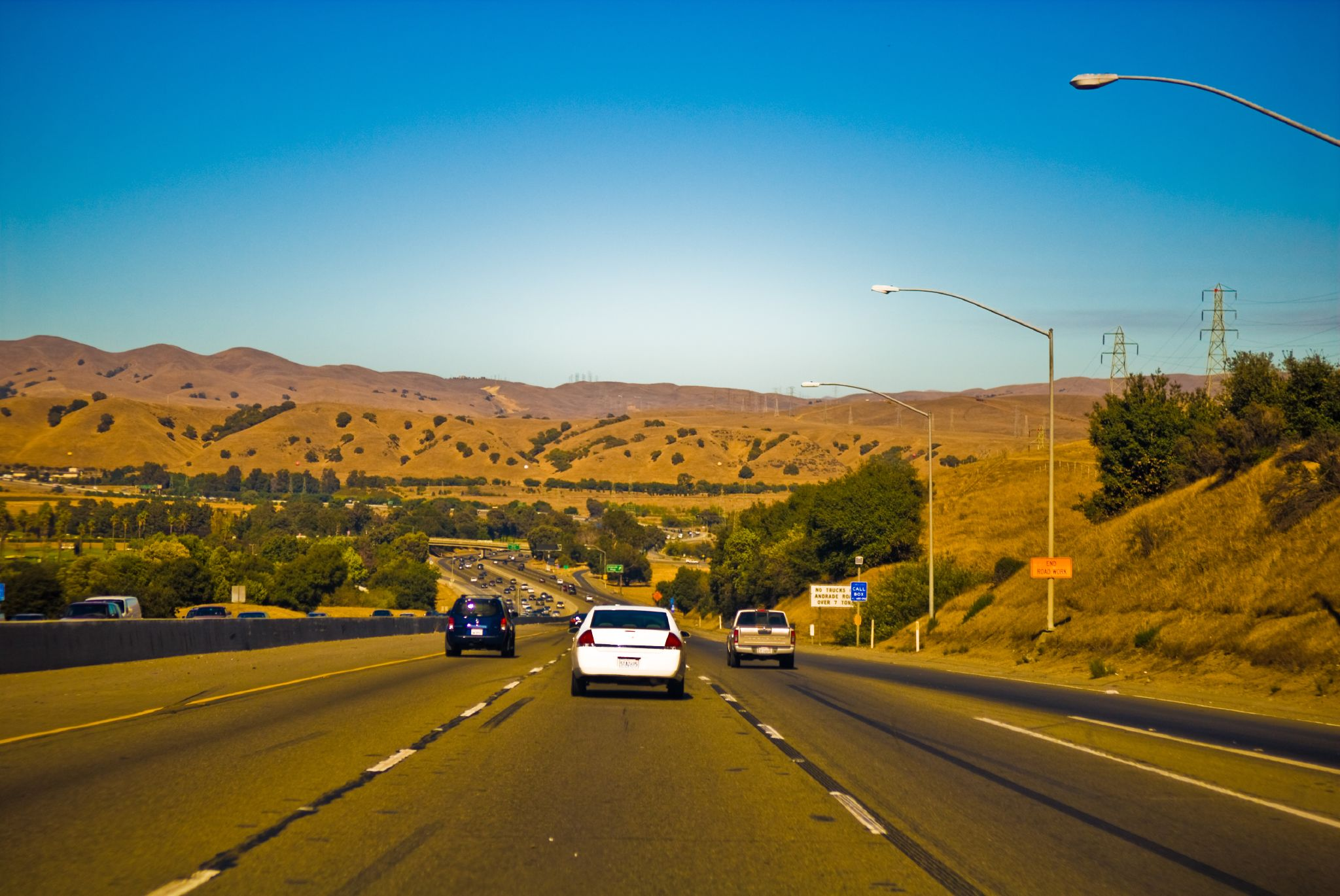
Descending from Mission Pass on I-680 northbound

The following is a list of eligible scenic state highway segments that the California State Legislature has added to Article 2.5 of Chapter 2 of Division 1 of the California Streets and Highways Code, and officially designated segments that Caltrans has approved to be signed.

- State Route 1
  - I-5 in San Juan Capistrano to SR 19 in Long Beach
  - State Route 128 between State Route 1 near Albion and Winters
  - SR 187 near Santa Monica to US 101 near El Rio
  - US 101 at Las Cruces to SR 246 in Lompoc
    - Cabrillo Highway, scenic drive through the rocky headlands near the Pacific coast
      - Designated December 14, 1971, in Santa Barbara County: US 101 at Las Cruces to Lompoc
  - SR 227 near Oceano to US 101 in Pismo Beach
  - US 101 in San Luis Obispo to SR 35 in Daly City
    - San Luis Obispo North Coast Byway (also an All-American Road), scenic drive along the Pacific coast
      - Designated August 13, 1999, in San Luis Obispo County: San Luis Obispo to Monterey County
    - Big Sur Coast Highway (also an All-American Road), scenic drive along the Pacific coast
      - Designated June 7, 1965, in Monterey County: San Luis Obispo County to Carmel River
      - Designated May 21, 1970, in Monterey County: Carmel River to SR 68 in Monterey
    - Cabrillo Highway, scenic drive along the Pacific coast
      - Designated June 25, 1976, in San Mateo County: Santa Cruz County to Half Moon Bay
  - SR 35 to US 101 in San Francisco
  - US 101 near Marin City to US 101 at Leggett
- State Route 2
  - I-210 in La Cañada Flintridge to SR 138 near Wrightwood
    - Part of the Angeles Crest Scenic Byway (also a National Forest Scenic Byway), runs through the San Gabriel Mountains with scenic views of the Los Angeles Basin and the Mojave Desert
      - Designated May 12, 1971, in Los Angeles County: La Cañada Flintridge to San Bernardino County
- State Route 3
  - SR 36 near Peanut to Montague
- State Route 4
  - SR 160 in Antioch to SR 84 near Brentwood
  - SR 49 in Angels Camp to SR 89 near Markleeville
    - Ebbetts Pass Scenic Byway (also a National Scenic Byway), crossing of the Sierra Nevada via Ebbetts Pass past giant sequoia groves
      - Designated November 9, 1971, in Calaveras County: Arnold to Alpine County
      - Designated September 14, 1970, in Alpine County: Calaveras County to SR 89 near Markleeville
- Interstate 5
  - Mexico to SR 75 in southern San Diego
  - SR 75 near downtown San Diego to SR 74 in San Juan Capistrano
  - I-210 in Sylmar to SR 126 in Santa Clarita
  - SR 152 near Los Banos to I-580 near Tracy
    - West Side Freeway, follows the western edge of the agricultural areas of the Central Valley, paralleling the California Aqueduct and the Delta–Mendota Canal
      - Designated October 25, 1968, in Merced County: SR 152 near Los Banos to Stanislaus County
      - Designated October 25, 1968, in Stanislaus County: Merced County to San Joaquin County
      - Designated June 7, 1974, in San Joaquin County: Stanislaus County to I-580 near Tracy
  - SR 44 in Redding to Shasta Lake
  - SR 89 near Mount Shasta to US 97 in Weed
  - SR 3 in Yreka to Oregon
- Interstate 8
  - Sunset Cliffs Boulevard in San Diego to SR 98 near Ocotillo
- State Route 9
  - SR 1 in Santa Cruz to SR 17 in Los Gatos
    - Saratoga-Los Gatos Road, scenic drive through suburban areas in and near Saratoga at the foot of the Santa Cruz Mountains
      - Designated October 18, 1979, in Santa Clara County: SR 35 at Saratoga Gap to Saratoga Sunnyvale Road in Saratoga
      - Designated May 2, 1968, in Santa Clara County: Saratoga Sunnyvale Road in Saratoga to Los Gatos
- Interstate 10
  - SR 38 in Redlands to SR 62 near White Water
- State Route 12
  - US 101 in Santa Rosa to SR 121 near Sonoma
    - Valley of the Moon Highway, passes through various wineries and vineyards of Sonoma Valley
      - Designated December 17, 1974, in Sonoma County: Santa Rosa to Agua Caliente
- State Route 13
  - SR 24 in Oakland to I-580 in Oakland
- State Route 14
  - SR 58 near Mojave to US 395 near Little Lake
- Interstate 15
  - SR 76 near Pala to SR 91 in Corona
  - SR 58 in Barstow to SR 127 at Baker
- State Route 16
  - SR 20 near Rumsey to Capay
- State Route 17
  - SR 1 in Santa Cruz to SR 9 in Los Gatos
- State Route 18
  - SR 138 at Crestline to SR 247 at Lucerne Valley
- State Route 20
  - SR 1 in Fort Bragg to SR 16 near Rumsey
  - SR 49 in Grass Valley to I-80 near Emigrant Gap
    - Part of the Yuba-Donner Scenic Byway (also a National Forest Scenic Byway), scenic drive through the pine forests of Tahoe National Forest
      - Designated March 12, 1971, in Nevada County: Relief to Bear Valley
- State Route 24
  - Caldecott Tunnel near Oakland to I-680 in Walnut Creek
    - Route 24, scenic drive through the rolling hills in Orinda and Lafayette with a view of Mount Diablo going eastbound
      - Designated October 22, 1982, in Contra Costa County: Caldecott Tunnel near Oakland to I-680 in Walnut Creek
- State Route 25
  - SR 198 near Priest Valley to SR 156 near Hollister
- State Route 27
  - SR 1 at Topanga Beach to Mulholland Drive in Los Angeles
    - Topanga Canyon Boulevard, runs through Topanga Canyon and part of Topanga State Park
      - Designated March 22, 2017, in Los Angeles County: Topanga Canyon
- State Route 28
  - SR 89 in Tahoe City to Nevada
- State Route 29
  - SR 37 in Vallejo to SR 221 near Napa
  - Trancas Street in Napa to SR 20 near Upper Lake
- State Route 33
  - US 101 in Ventura to SR 166 near Cuyama
    - Jacinto Reyes Scenic Byway (also a National Forest Scenic Byway), scenic drive through Los Padres National Forest past pine forests and semi-desert landscapes
      - Designated February 18, 1972, in Ventura County: Wheeler Springs to near Sespe Gorge
      - Designated July 11, 1988, in Ventura County: near Sespe Gorge to near Pine Mountain Ridge Road
      - Designated February 18, 1972, in Ventura County: near Pine Mountain Ridge Road to near Lockwood Valley Road
      - Designated July 11, 1988, in Ventura County: near Lockwood Valley Road to Santa Barbara County
- State Route 35
  - SR 17 near Redwood Estates to SR 1 in San Francisco
    - Skyline Boulevard, runs along the ridge of the Santa Cruz Mountains
      - Designated September 13, 1968, in San Mateo County: Santa Cruz County to near Page Mill Road
      - Designated January 22, 1968, in San Mateo County: near Page Mill Road to SR 92 near Crystal Springs Reservoir
- State Route 36
  - US 101 near Fortuna to SR 3 near Peanut
- State Route 37
  - SR 251 near Nicasio to SR 29 in Vallejo
- State Route 38
  - I-10 in Redlands to SR 18 at Big Bear Dam
    - Rim of the World Scenic Byway (also a National Forest Scenic Byway), drive through the San Bernardino Mountains with scenic views of forested mountains and desert areas
      - Designated March 19, 1968, in San Bernardino County: Santa Ana River to State Lane near Sugarloaf
- State Route 39
  - I-210 in Azusa to SR 2 at Islip Saddle
- Interstate 40
  - Barstow to Needles
- State Route 41
  - SR 1 in Morro Bay to US 101 in Atascadero
  - SR 46 near Cholame to SR 33 at Reef Station
  - SR 49 at Oakhurst to Yosemite National Park
- State Route 44
  - I-5 in Redding to SR 89 near Old Station
- State Route 46
  - SR 1 near Cambria to SR 41 near Cholame
- State Route 49
  - SR 41 at Oakhurst to SR 89 at Sattley
    - Part of the Yuba-Donner Scenic Byway (also a National Forest Scenic Byway), scenic drive through the Yuba River canyon past several historic mining communities of the California Gold Rush
      - Designated July 14, 1971, in Sierra County: Yuba County to Yuba Pass
- U.S. Route 50
  - SR 49 in Placerville to Nevada
    - Route 50, crossing of the Sierra Nevada via the American River Canyon and Echo Summit towards Lake Tahoe
      - Designated April 2, 1985, in El Dorado County: Placerville Drive in Placerville (west of SR 49) to Echo Summit
      - Designated April 1, 1986, in El Dorado County: Echo Summit to South Lake Tahoe
- State Route 52
  - I-5 in San Diego to SR 67 in Santee
    - Route 52, runs along the northern boundary of Mission Trails Regional Park with scenic views of Cowles Mountain
      - Designated February 2, 2016, in San Diego County: near Santo Road to near Mast Boulevard in San Diego
- State Route 53
  - SR 29 at Lower Lake to SR 20 near Clearlake
- State Route 57
  - SR 90 in Brea to SR 60 near Industry
- State Route 58
  - SR 14 near Mojave to I-15 in Barstow
- State Route 62
  - I-10 near White Water to Arizona
    - Twentynine Palms Highway, runs through scenic high desert country and Joshua Tree National Monument
      - Designated September 14, 1972, in Riverside County: I-10 near White Water to San Bernardino County
- State Route 68
  - Monterey to US 101 in Salinas
    - Route 68, runs through areas of oak, sycamore, and pine trees east of Monterey
      - Designated June 19, 1968, in Monterey County: SR 1 in Monterey to Salinas River
- State Route 70
  - SR 149 at Wicks Corner to SR 89 at Blairsden
- State Route 71
  - SR 91 near Corona to SR 83 in Chino Hills
- State Route 74
  - I-5 in San Juan Capistrano to SR 111 in Palm Desert, California
    - Part of the Pines to Palms Scenic Byway (also a National Forest Scenic Byway), scenic drive from the forests of San Bernardino National Forest to Mojave Desert areas
      - Designated October 18, 1971, in Riverside County: San Bernardino National Forest west boundary to SR 111 in Palm Desert
- State Route 75
  - I-5 in southern San Diego to I-5 near downtown San Diego
    - Silver Strand Highway, scenic drive along the Silver Strand and across the San Diego-Coronado Bridge
      - Designated March 4, 1974, in San Diego County: Imperial Beach to Avenida del Sol in Coronado
      - Designated February 17, 1969, in San Diego County: San Diego-Coronado Bridge
- State Route 76
  - I-5 in Oceanside to SR 79 near Lake Henshaw
- State Route 78
  - SR 79 at Santa Ysabel to SR 86 near Salton City
    - Anza-Borrego Desert State Park Road, traverses the low desert landscapes of Anza-Borrego Desert State Park
      - Designated December 14, 1971, in San Diego County: Anza-Borrego Desert State Park
- State Route 79
  - I-8 near Descanso to SR 371 at Aguanga
- Interstate 80
  - I-280 in San Francisco to SR 61 in Oakland
  - SR 20 near Emigrant Gap to Nevada
- State Route 84
  - SR 238 in Fremont to I-680 near Sunol
    - Niles Canyon Road, runs through Niles Canyon
      - Designated July 27, 2007, in Alameda County: SR 238 in Fremont to I-680 near Sunol
- State Route 88
  - SR 49 in Jackson to Nevada
    - Carson Pass Highway, (also a National Forest Scenic Byway), crossing of the Sierra Nevada via Carson Pass
      - Designated July 30, 1986, in Amador County: Dew Drop Ranger Station to Alpine County
      - Designated September 14, 1970, in Alpine County: Amador County to Nevada
- State Route 89
  - US 395 near Coleville to I-5 near Mount Shasta
    - Monitor Pass and Luther Pass Highways, and Lake Tahoe Road, scenic drive through the forests of Sierra Nevada and along the southwestern side of Lake Tahoe
      - Designated November 9, 1971, in Mono County: Slinkard Valley to Alpine County
      - Designated 1970-09-14 in Alpine County: Mono County to El Dorado County
      - Designated April 1, 1986, in El Dorado County: Alpine County to Placer County
- State Route 91
  - SR 55 in Anaheim to I-15 in Corona
    - Riverside Freeway, runs along the banks of the Santa Ana River past riparian areas and chaparral vegetation
      - Designated Novembere 15, 1971, in Orange County: SR 55 in Anaheim to Anaheim east limit
- State Route 92
  - SR 1 in Half Moon Bay to I-280 near Crystal Springs Reservoir
- State Route 94
  - SR 125 near Spring Valley to I-8 near Jacumba
- State Route 96
  - SR 299 at Willow Creek to I-5 near Yreka
- U.S. Route 97
  - I-5 in Weed to Oregon
- U.S. Route 101
  - SR 27 in Woodland Hills to SR 46 in Paso Robles
    - Gaviota Coast segment of the El Camino Real, scenic drive along the Pacific coast and through the Santa Ynez Mountains
      - Designated December 13, 2016, in Santa Barbara County: Goleta west limit to SR 1 in Las Cruces
  - Golden Gate Bridge to SR 1 near Marin City
  - SR 1 at Leggett to US 199 near Crescent City
    - Redwood Highway, runs through the redwood forests of Del Norte Coast Redwoods State Park
      - Designated February 18, 1970, in Del Norte County: Del Norte Coast Redwoods State Park
  - SR 197 near Smith River to Oregon
- State Route 108
  - SR 49 in Sonora to US 395 near Bridgeport
- State Route 111
  - Bombay Beach to SR 195 at Mecca
  - SR 74 in Palm Desert to I-10 near White Water
- State Route 116
  - SR 1 near Jenner to US 101 in Cotati
    - Route 116, scenic drive along the Russian River
      - Designated September 20, 1988, in Sonoma County: SR 1 near Jenner to Sebastopol east limit
- State Route 118
  - SR 23 in Moorpark to De Soto Avenue in Los Angeles
- State Route 120
  - Yosemite National Park to US 395 near Mono Lake
- State Route 121
  - SR 37 near Sears Point to SR 12 near Sonoma
  - SR 221 in Napa to Trancas Street near Napa
- State Route 125
  - SR 94 near Spring Valley to I-8 in La Mesa
    - Route 125, passes through scenic areas west of Mount Helix
      - Designated March 1, 1971, in San Diego County: SR 94 near Spring Valley to I-8 in La Mesa
- State Route 126
  - SR 150 in Santa Paula to I-5 in Santa Clarita
- State Route 127
  - I-15 at Baker to Nevada
- State Route 138
  - SR 2 near Wrightwood to SR 18 at Crestline
- State Route 139
  - SR 299 near Canby to Oregon
- State Route 140
  - SR 49 at Mariposa to Yosemite National Park
    - Route 140, scenic drive through the Merced River Canyon to Yosemite National Park
      - Designated August 30, 1991, in Mariposa County: Mariposa to El Portal
- State Route 142
  - Brea to Peyton Drive in Chino Hills
- State Route 146
  - Pinnacles National Park to SR 25 near Paicines
- State Route 150
  - US 101 in Carpinteria to SR 126 in Santa Paula
- State Route 151
  - Shasta Dam to I-5 in Shasta Lake
    - Shasta Dam Boulevard, runs along the slope of a ridge overlooking Shasta Lake and the Sacramento River
      - Designated September 9, 1981, in Shasta County: Shasta Dam to Shasta Lake
- State Route 152
  - SR 1 in Watsonville to Hecker Pass
  - SR 156 near San Felipe to I-5 near Los Banos
    - Pacheco Pass Road, runs along the northern and eastern shore of the San Luis Reservoir, and through the western edge of the Central Valley
      - Designated June 19, 1970, in Merced County: Santa Clara County to I-5 near Los Banos
- State Route 154
  - US 101 near Los Olivos to US 101 in Santa Barbara
    - San Marcos Pass Road, passes through the Santa Ynez Valley and over San Marcos Pass in the Santa Ynez Mountains
      - Designated November 22, 1968, in Santa Barbara County: US 101 near Los Olivos to US 101 in Santa Barbara
- State Route 156
  - SR 1 near Castroville to SR 152 near San Felipe
    - Route 156, traverses agricultural areas, particularly artichoke crops, between Castroville (nicknamed the "Artichoke Center of the World") and Prunedale
      - Designated September 14, 1972, in Monterey County: Castroville to US 101 near Prunedale
- State Route 158
  - US 395 at June Lake Junction to US 395 at Grant Lake Junction
- State Route 160
  - SR 4 in Antioch to Sacramento
    - River Road, runs along the Sacramento River in the Sacramento–San Joaquin River Delta
      - Designated October 3, 1969, in Sacramento County: Contra Costa County to Sacramento
- State Route 161
  - US 97 near Dorris to SR 139 near Tulelake
- State Route 163
  - Ash Street in downtown San Diego to I-8 in San Diego
    - Cabrillo Freeway, a landscaped parkway through Balboa Park in San Diego
      - Designated April 24, 1992, in San Diego County: Balboa Park
- State Route 166
  - US 101 near Santa Maria to SR 33 near Cuyama
- State Route 168
  - SR 65 near Clovis to Huntington Lake
  - Camp Sabrina to SR 266 at Oasis
    - Part of the Ancient Bristlecone Scenic Byway (also a National Forest Scenic Byway), scenic drive through the eastern side of the Sierra Nevada
      - Designated June 19, 1970, in Inyo County: Camp Sabrina to Bishop
- State Route 173
  - SR 138 in Hesperia to SR 18 near Lake Arrowhead
- State Route 174
  - Bear River to Grass Valley
- State Route 178
  - Death Valley National Park to SR 127 near Shoshone
- State Route 180
  - SR 65 near Minkler to Kings Canyon
    - Part of the Kings Canyon Scenic Byway (also a National Forest Scenic Byway), scenic drive through the Sierra Nevada to Kings Canyon National Park
      - Designated October 15, 2015, in Fresno County: near Minkler to Tulare County
      - Designated October 15, 2015, in Tulare County: Fresno County to near General Grant Grove
      - Designated October 15, 2015, in Fresno County: near General Grant Grove to Kings Canyon
- State Route 190
  - SR 65 in Porterville to SR 127 at Death Valley Junction
    - Death Valley Scenic Byway (also a National Scenic Byway), scenic drive through Death Valley National Park, the lowest place in North America, surrounded by mountains
      - Designated May 10, 1968, in Inyo County: Death Valley National Park (original boundaries)
      - Designated January 7, 2002, in Inyo County: Death Valley National Park (new boundaries)
- State Route 197
  - US 199 near Hiouchi to US 101 near Smith River
- State Route 198
  - US 101 near San Lucas to I-5 near Coalinga
  - SR 99 near Goshen to Sequoia National Park
- U.S. Route 199
  - US 101 near Crescent City to Oregon
- State Route 203
  - Minaret Summit to US 395 near Mammoth Lakes
- State Route 209
  - Point Loma to I-5 in San Diego
- Interstate 210/State Route 210
  - I-5 in Sylmar to SR 134 in Pasadena
  - SR 330 San Bernardinoto I-10 in Redlands
- State Route 221
  - SR 29 near Napa to SR 121 in Napa
- State Route 236
  - SR 9 at Boulder Creek to SR 9 at Waterman Gap
- State Route 239
  - I-580 near Tracy to SR 4 near Brentwood
- State Route 243
  - SR 74 at Mountain Center to I-10 in Banning
    - Part of the Pines to Palms Scenic Byway (also a National Forest Scenic Byway), scenic drive from the ridge of the San Bernardino Mountains to the San Bernardino Valley
      - Designated March 21, 1972, in Riverside County: SR 74 at Mountain Center to Banning
- State Route 247
  - SR 62 in Yucca Valley to I-15 in Barstow
- State Route 251
  - SR 37 near Nicasio to SR 1 near Point Reyes Station
- State Route 254
  - US 101 near Phillipsville to US 101 near Stafford
- State Route 266
  - Nevada east of Oasis to SR 168 at Oasis
- Interstate 280
  - I-880/SR 17 in San Jose to I-80 in San Francisco
    - Junipero Serra Freeway, nicknamed as the "World's Most Beautiful Freeway", scenic route through the hills of the San Francisco Peninsula
      - Designated April 28, 1980, in San Mateo County: Santa Clara County to South San Francisco
- State Route 299
  - US 101 in Arcata to SR 96 at Willow Creek
  - SR 3 at Weaverville to I-5 in Redding
  - SR 89 near Burney to SR 139 near Canby
- State Route 330
  - SR 210 San Bernardino to SR 18 at Running Springs
- U.S. Route 395
  - SR 14 near Little Lake to SR 89 near Coleville
    - Route 395, runs through the Owens Valley and high desert meadows, with views of the ranges and peaks of the Eastern Sierra Nevada
      - Designated June 30, 1970, in Inyo County: Independence to Fish Springs
      - Designated June 5, 2000, in Mono County: Inyo County to near Crowley Lake
      - Designated November 9, 1971, in Mono County: near Crowley Lake to near Mammoth Lakes
      - Designated June 5, 2000, in Mono County: near Mammoth Lakes to SR 120 near Mono Lake
      - Designated June 5, 2000, in Mono County: Lee Vining to Bridgeport
      - Designated June 5, 2000, in Mono County: Bridgeport to Walker
- Interstate 580
  - I-5 near Tracy to I-80 in Oakland
    - Route 580, traverses the eastern edge of the Coast Ranges and the western edge of the Central Valley
      - Designated June 7, 1974, in San Joaquin County: I-5 near Tracy to Alameda County
      - Designated February 18, 1970, in Alameda County: San Joaquin County to I-205 near Tracy
    - MacArthur Freeway, scenic landscaped route through Oakland
      - Designated June 25, 1976, in Alameda County: San Leandro to I-980/SR 24 in Oakland
- Interstate 680
  - Milpitas to SR 24 in Walnut Creek
    - Route 680, crosses wooded hills and valleys of the Coast Ranges
      - Designated June 15, 1978, in Alameda County: SR 238 in Fremont to Bernal Avenue in Pleasanton
      - Designated October 22, 1982, in Alameda County: Bernal Avenue in Pleasanton to Contra Costa County
      - Designated October 22, 1982, in Contra Costa County: Alameda County to SR 24 in Walnut Creek

== Designated county highways ==
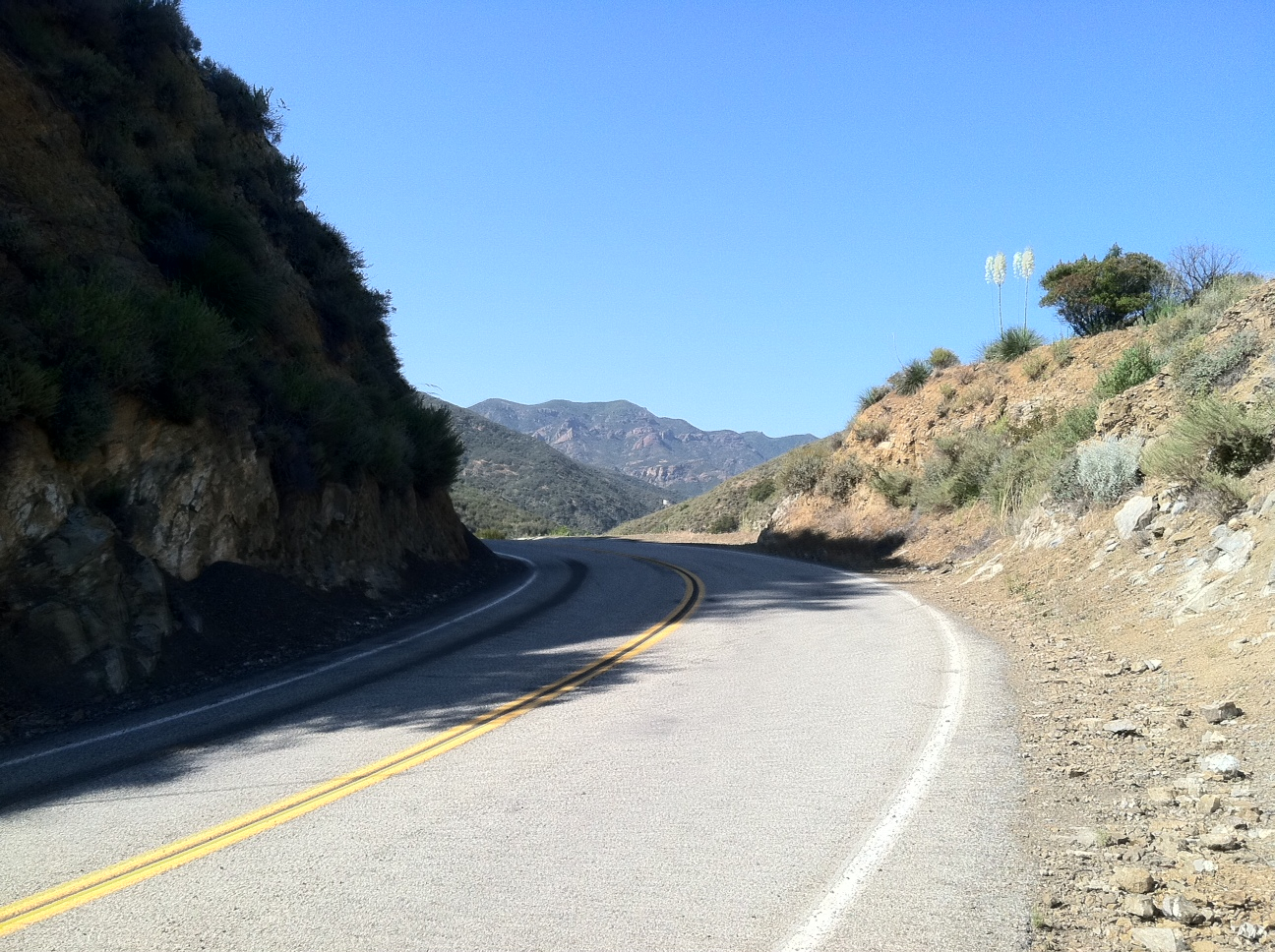
Mulholland Highway through Leo Carrillo State Park, with Sandstone Peak in the distance

Any county highway segment that is believed to have outstanding scenic qualities is considered eligible to be listed along with the state's scenic highway program. The county with jurisdiction must apply that segment to Caltrans using the same approval process as state highways (neither the California State Legislature via the California Streets and Highways Code nor Caltrans maintain a master list of every eligible county highway).

The following county roads have officially been designated as county scenic highways by Caltrans:

- County Route A18
  - Lake Boulevard, scenic drive overlooking Shasta Lake
    - Designated 1981 in Shasta County: Whiskeytown-Shasta-Trinity National Recreation Area
- County Route G14
  - Nacimiento Lake Drive and Interlake Road, travels through the foothills of the Santa Lucia Range in the vicinity of Lake Nacimiento and Lake San Antonio
    - Designated 1981 in San Luis Obispo County: Chimney Rock Road near Paso Robles to Monterey County
    - Designated 1971 in Monterey County: San Luis Obispo County to CR G18 (Jolon Road) at Lockwood
- County Route G20
  - Laureles Grade, a steep, winding scenic road between Carmel Valley Village and Monterey
    - Designated 1969 in Monterey County: Carmel Valley Road to SR 68 near Monterey
- County Route N1
  - Malibu Canyon Road and Las Virgenes Road, traverses Malibu Canyon and the Santa Monica Mountains
    - Designated 2002 in Los Angeles County: SR 1 in Malibu to Lost Hills Road in Calabasas
- Mulholland Highway
  - The western segment of Mulholland Highway through the Santa Monica Mountains from Leo Carrillo State Park to Rocky Oaks
    - Designated 2002 in Los Angeles County: SR 1 at Leo Carrillo State Park to CR N9 (Kanan Dume Road) near Cornell
  - The segment of Mulholland Highway through Malibu Creek State Park
    - Designated 2002 in Los Angeles County: Cornell Road to Las Virgenes Road
- River Road
  - The segment of River Road not signed as part of SR 160 that runs along the Sacramento River in the Sacramento–San Joaquin River Delta. Includes a portion of County Route E13.
    - Designated 1969 in Sacramento County: SR 160 near Isleton to SR 160 near Paintersville
