= Sespe Gorge =

Valley in Ventura County, California, USA

Coordinates: 34.5788768°N 119.2581680°W

Sespe Gorge is a rugged section of the upper Sespe Creek in Ventura County, southern California. The formation is several miles downstream from the creek's headwaters. The Sespe Condor Sanctuary is located in the southern end of the gorge, with no public access. North of the sanctuary is the Sespe Wilderness, where Sespe Creek and surrounding area is accessible with hiking trails and campgrounds.
