= Whitewater, California =

Whitewater
- Census-designated place
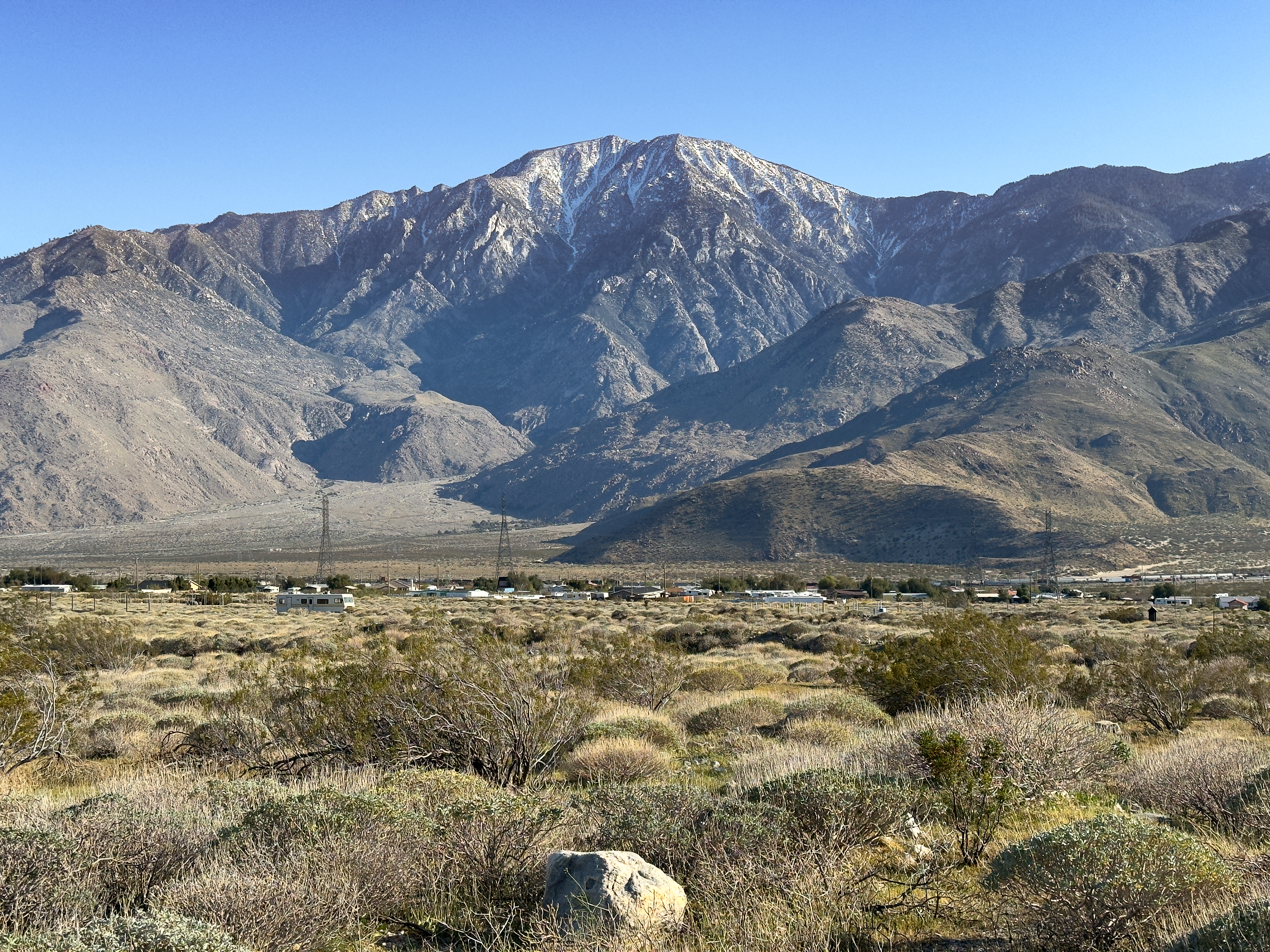
- Whitewater and San Jacinto Peak

- Location within the state of California Whitewater (the United States)
- Coordinates: 33°56′08″N 116°41′14″W
- Country: United States
- State: California
- County: Riverside

Area
  - Total: 9.877 sq mi (25.581 km^{2})
  - Land: 9.877 sq mi (25.581 km^{2})
  - Water: 0 sq mi (0 km^{2}) 0%
- Elevation: 1,575 ft (480 m)

Population (2020)
  - Total: 984
  - Density: 99.6/sq mi (38.5/km^{2})
- Time zone: UTC-8 (Pacific (PST))
  - Summer (DST): UTC-7 (PDT)
- ZIP codes: 92282
- Area code: 760
- GNIS feature ID: 2583184

Whitewater (formerly White Water) is a census-designated place in Riverside County, California. It is directly off Interstate 10 halfway between North Palm Springs and Cabazon on the way from Palm Springs to Los Angeles. It is known as the site of the San Gorgonio Pass Wind Farm. The ZIP Code is 92282, and the community is inside area code 760. The population was 984 at the 2020 census. The elevation is 1,575 feet (480 m).

Whitewater is famous for its recently renovated trout farm in the canyon of the Whitewater River.

== History ==
Whitewater, still a populated place on the west bank of the Whitewater River, is located 10 miles (16 km) northwest of Palm Springs.33°54′52″N 116°42′38″W It began as rest and watering place for travelers on the Bradshaw Trail between San Bernardino and La Paz Arizona Territory in 1862. With the start of the Colorado River Gold Rush the trail was created to ship goods and allow people to cross the desert to the new boom towns on the Colorado River and the interior of Arizona Territory. Whitewater got its name from the White Water Station, a stagecoach station that was located there on the Bradshaw Trail. The settlement at White Water remained as a stop on the road into the Coachella Valley and to other desert regions to the east as it does today.

== Geography ==
Whitewater is located at 33°55′27″N 116°38′40″W (33.924203 N, 116.644453 W) and is named for the nearby Whitewater River. The wind farm is located near the I-10 exit at 33°54′52″N 116°42′38″W (33.914456 N, 116.743897 W). The area has nearly constant wind due to the venturi effect created by the San Bernardino Mountains to the north and the San Jacinto Mountains to the south, resulting in perfect conditions for the wind farm.

According to the United States Census Bureau, the CDP covers an area of 9.9 square miles (25.6 km^{2}), all of it land.

=== Climate ===
According to the Köppen Climate Classification system, Whitewater has a warm-summer Mediterranean climate, abbreviated "Csa" on climate maps.

== Demographics ==
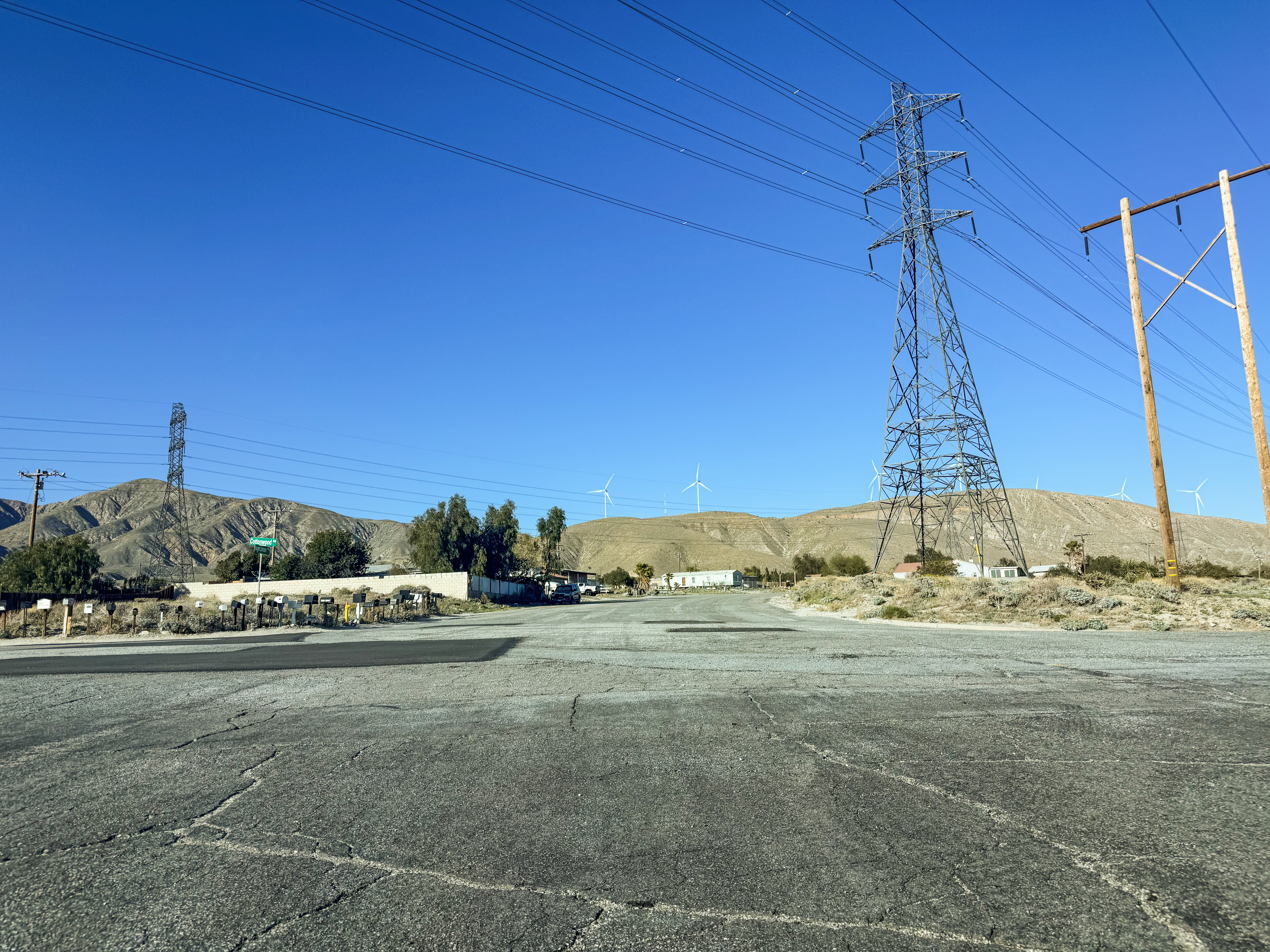
Cottonwood Road and Haugen Lehmann Way Intersection

Historical population
Census	Pop.	Note	%±
2010	859		—
2020	984		14.6%
U.S. Decennial Census; 1860–1870 1880-1890; 1900 1910 1920; 1930 1940 1950; 1960 1970 1980; 1990 2000 2010

Whitewater first appeared as a census-designated place in the 2010 U.S. census.

=== Racial and ethnic composition ===
Whitewater CDP, California – Racial and ethnic composition Note: the US Census treats Hispanic/Latino as an ethnic category. This table excludes Latinos from the racial categories and assigns them to a separate category. Hispanics/Latinos may be of any race.
Race / Ethnicity (NH = Non-Hispanic)	Pop 2010	Pop 2020	% 2010	% 2020
White alone (NH)	496	307	57.74%	31.20%
Black or African American alone (NH)	36	49	4.19%	4.98%
Native American or Alaska Native alone (NH)	24	10	2.79%	1.02%
Asian alone (NH)	17	17	1.98%	1.73%
Native Hawaiian or Pacific Islander alone (NH)	0	7	0.00%	0.71%
Other race alone (NH)	1	1	0.12%	0.10%
Mixed race or Multiracial (NH)	18	53	2.10%	5.39%
Hispanic or Latino (any race)	267	540	31.08%	54.88%
Total	859	984	100.00%	100.00%

=== 2020 census ===
The 2020 United States census reported that Whitewater had a population of 984. The population density was 99.6 inhabitants per square mile (38.5/km^{2}). The racial makeup was 405 (41.2%) White, 56 (5.7%) African American, 23 (2.3%) Native American, 18 (1.8%) Asian, 7 (0.7%) Pacific Islander, 303 (30.8%) from other races, and 172 (17.5%) from two or more races. Hispanic or Latino of any race were 540 persons (54.9%).

The census reported that 969 people (98.5% of the population) lived in households, 3 (0.3%) lived in non-institutionalized group quarters, and 12 (1.2%) were institutionalized.

There were 334 households, out of which 103 (30.8%) had children under the age of 18 living in them, 136 (40.7%) were married-couple households, 37 (11.1%) were cohabiting couple households, 91 (27.2%) had a female householder with no partner present, and 70 (21.0%) had a male householder with no partner present. 71 households (21.3%) were one person, and 26 (7.8%) were one person aged 65 or older. The average household size was 2.9. There were 230 families (68.9% of all households).

The age distribution was 213 people (21.6%) under the age of 18, 93 people (9.5%) aged 18 to 24, 263 people (26.7%) aged 25 to 44, 281 people (28.6%) aged 45 to 64, and 134 people (13.6%) who were 65 years of age or older. The median age was 39.0 years. For every 100 females, there were 97.2 males.

There were 392 housing units at an average density of 39.7 units per square mile (15.3 units/km^{2}), of which 334 (85.2%) were occupied. Of these, 247 (74.0%) were owner-occupied, and 87 (26.0%) were occupied by renters.

== Government ==
Federal:

- In the United States House of Representatives, Whitewater is in California's 25th congressional district, represented by Democrat Raul Ruiz.
- In the United States Senate, California is represented by Democrats Adam Schiff and Alex Padilla.

State:

- In the California State Legislature, Whitewater is in the 19th senatorial district, represented by Republican Rosilicie Ochoa Bogh, and in the 47th Assembly district, represented by Republican Greg Wallis.

County:

- In the Riverside County Board of Supervisors, Whitewater is in the Fifth District, represented by Libertarian Jeff Hewitt.
- In the jurisdiction of the Riverside County Sheriff's Department, with Sheriff Chad Bianco.

== Education ==
It is in the Banning Unified School District.
