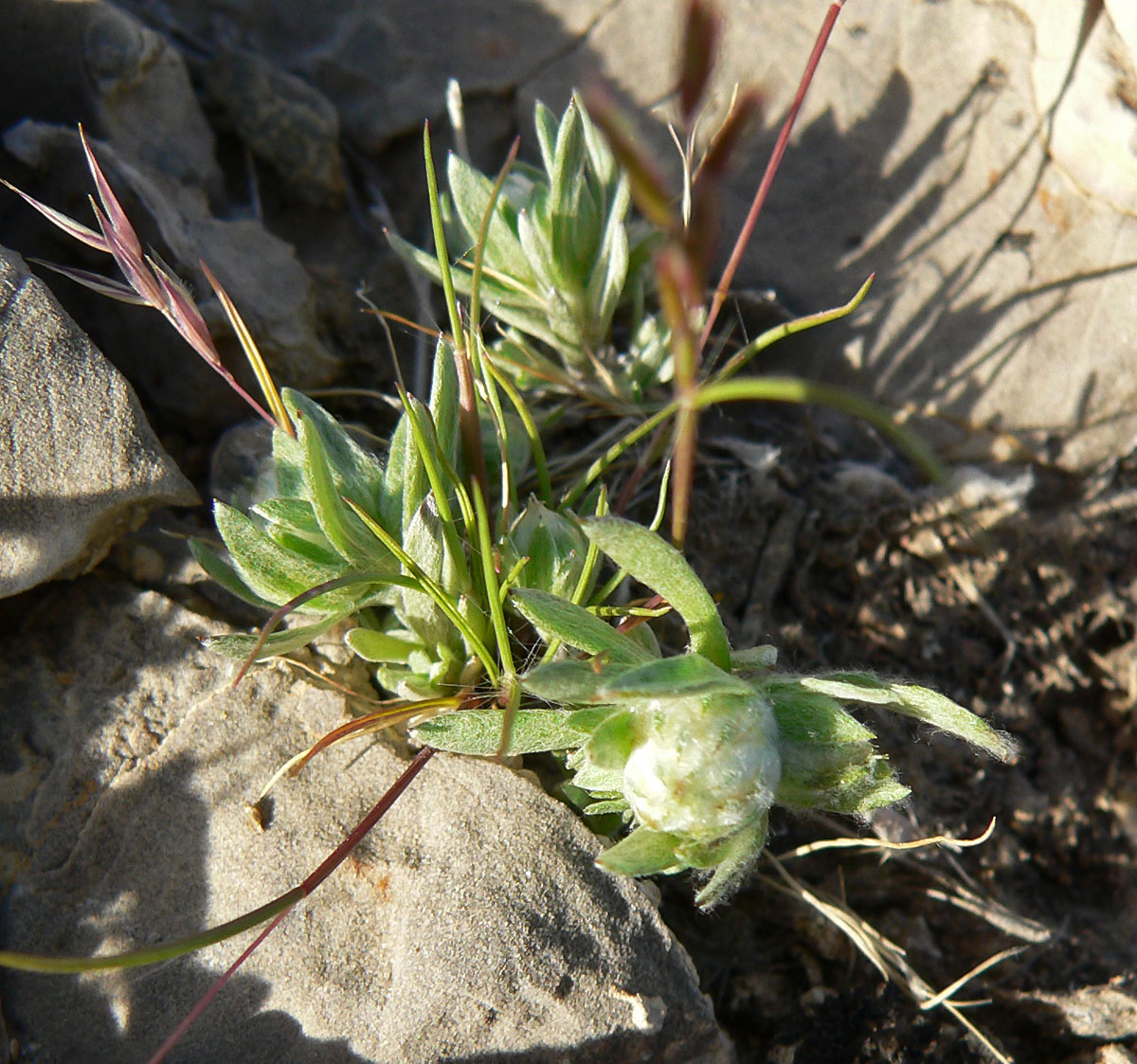
- Stylocline micropoides southern Nevada

Scientific classification
- Kingdom: Plantae
- Clade: Embryophytes
- Clade: Tracheophytes
- Clade: Spermatophytes
- Clade: Angiosperms
- Clade: Eudicots
- Clade: Asterids
- Order: Asterales
- Family: Asteraceae
- Subfamily: Asteroideae
- Tribe: Gnaphalieae
- Genus: Stylocline; Nutt.

Type species
- Stylocline gnaphaloides Nutt.

= Stylocline =

Genus of plants

Stylocline (neststraw) is a small genus of North American desert plants in the tribe Gnaphalieae within the family Asteraceae.

Neststraw is native to the southwestern United States and northern Mexico.

== Description ==
Species of Stylocline are generally small plants, and certain ones are difficult to distinguish from each other because identifying characteristics are too small to see with the naked eye.

They are annuals with woolly, hairy, or spiderwebby textures. Thin stems end in heads of disc flowers or tubular pistillate flowers. The fruits are smooth and shiny and encapsulated within the disc heads.

=== Species ===
Species include:

- Stylocline citroleum - oil neststraw — California (Kern + San Diego Counties)
- Stylocline gnaphaloides - mountain neststraw — California, Arizona
- Stylocline intertexta - Morefield's neststraw — California, Arizona, Nevada, Utah
- Stylocline masonii - Mason's neststraw — California (Kern, Los Angeles, San Luis Obispo, & Monterey Counties)
- Stylocline micropoides - woolly neststraw — Sonora, Baja California, California, Arizona, Nevada, Utah, New Mexico, Texas
- Stylocline psilocarphoides - baretwig neststraw — California, Nevada, Oregon, Idaho, Utah
- Stylocline sonorensis - Sonoran neststraw — Sonora, California (Riverside County), and Arizona (Pima, Pinal, Santa Cruz, & Graham Counties)

==== Former species ====
Species formerly included and reclassified:

- Stylocline acaulis — Hesperevax acaulis
- Stylocline amphibola — Micropus amphibolus
- Stylocline amphiloba — Micropus amphibolus
- Stylocline griffithii — Cymbolaena griffithii
- Stylocline filaginea var. filaginea — Ancistrocarphus filagineus
- See also other species of the genera Ancistrocarphus, Cymbolaena, Hesperevax, and Micropus.
