= Offshore oil and gas in California =

Drilling in state and federal zones

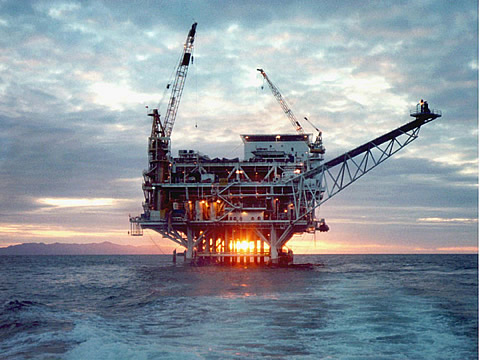
All oil drilling into the South Ellwood Offshore field takes place from Platform Holly, about two miles (3 km) offshore in state waters 34.3898°N 119.9065°W.

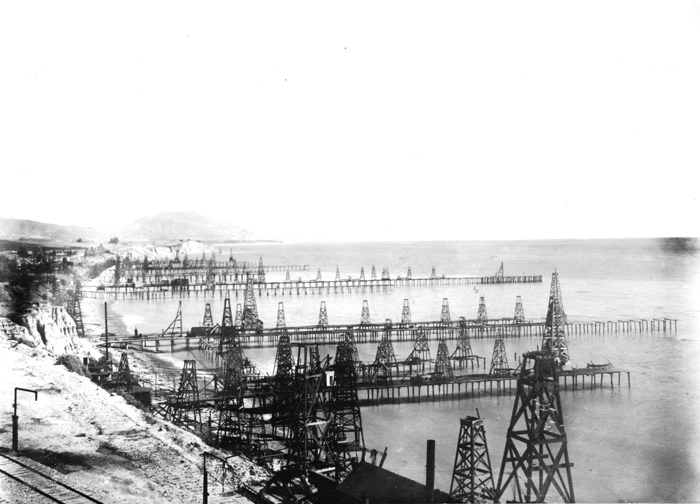
Oil wells on wharves built out over the ocean, Summerland oil field, 1902.

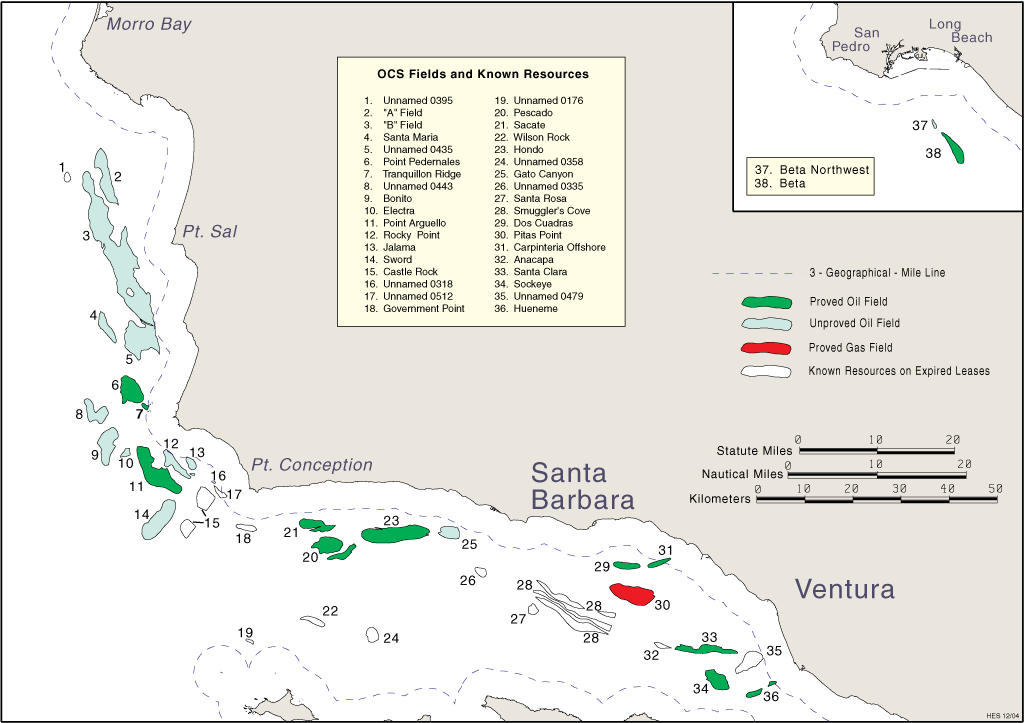
Known oil and gas fields in federal waters, offshore California (Minerals Management Service)

Offshore oil and gas in California provides a significant portion of the state's petroleum production. Offshore oil and gas has been a contentious issue for decades, first over the question of state versus federal ownership, but since 1969 mostly over questions of resource development versus environmental protection.

Notable offshore fields include the Ellwood Oil Field and the Wilmington Oil Field, both of which are partially onshore and partially offshore, and the large Dos Cuadras Field in the Santa Barbara Channel, which is entirely in the federal zone.

State offshore seabed in California produced 37,400 barrels (5,900 m^{3}) of oil per day, and federal offshore tracts produced 66,400 barrels (11,000 m^{3}) of oil per day in November 2008. State and federal offshore tracts together made up 16% of the state's oil production.

== Pre-oil industry ==
Knowledge of the probable existence of oil off the coast of California dates back to the early European explorers who noted oil slicks in the Santa Barbara channel (see Coal Oil Point seep field). In 1792, when the English explorer James Cook anchored his ship in the Santa Barbara Channel, his navigator George Vancouver wrote that the sea was “... covered with a thick, slimy substance,” and added “... the sea had the appearance of dissolved tar floating on its surface, which covered the ocean in all directions within the limits of our view.”

In 1865, oil geologist Charles Jackson wrote:

“Off the coast of Santa Barbara. The strong smell of petroleum comes from the sea, the oil floating on the water.”

A description of the oil and gas seeps offshore southern California can be found in a report on the California Division of Oil and Gas's website. The report is accompanied by a map, showing the locations of offshore petroleum seeps from Point Arguello (north of Santa Barbara) to Mexico.

== Extension of onshore fields ==
Offshore drilling began in California in 1896, when operators in the Summerland Oil Field in Santa Barbara County followed the field into the ocean by drilling from piers built out over the ocean. At least 187 offshore oil wells were drilled in the Summerland Field by 1902.

The Wilmington Oil Field in Los Angeles and Long Beach was extended offshore into Long Beach Harbor by drilling numerous wells directionally from four artificial islands in the harbor. The THUMS artificial islands, owned by the City of Long Beach, are landscaped with palm trees. A number of other coastal fields were extended offshore in Santa Barbara, Ventura, Los Angeles, and Orange counties, usually by directional drilling.

== Ownership of offshore oil and gas ==
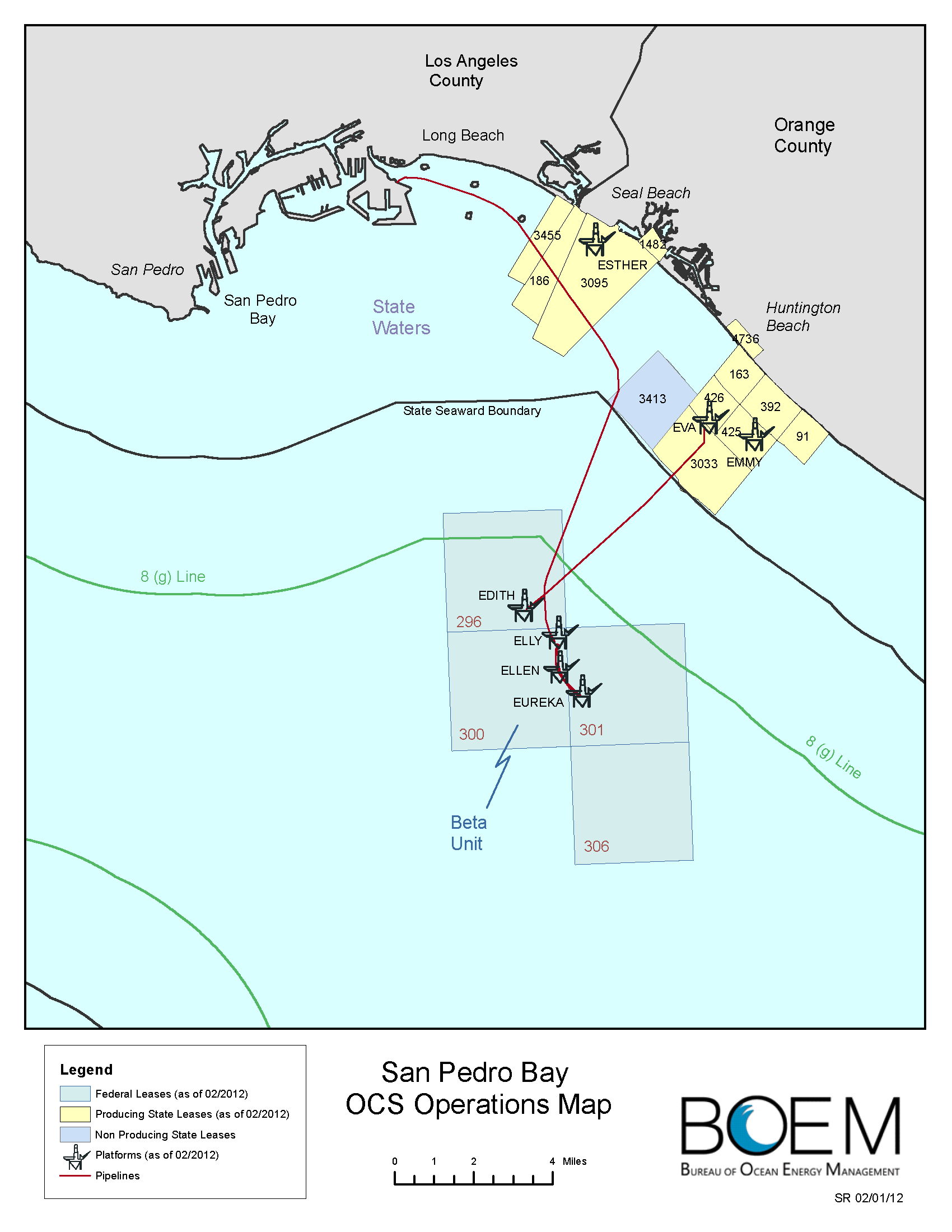
Oil platforms in the Long Beach area. The four small islands shown in Long Beach Harbor are artificial islands for oil and gas wells.

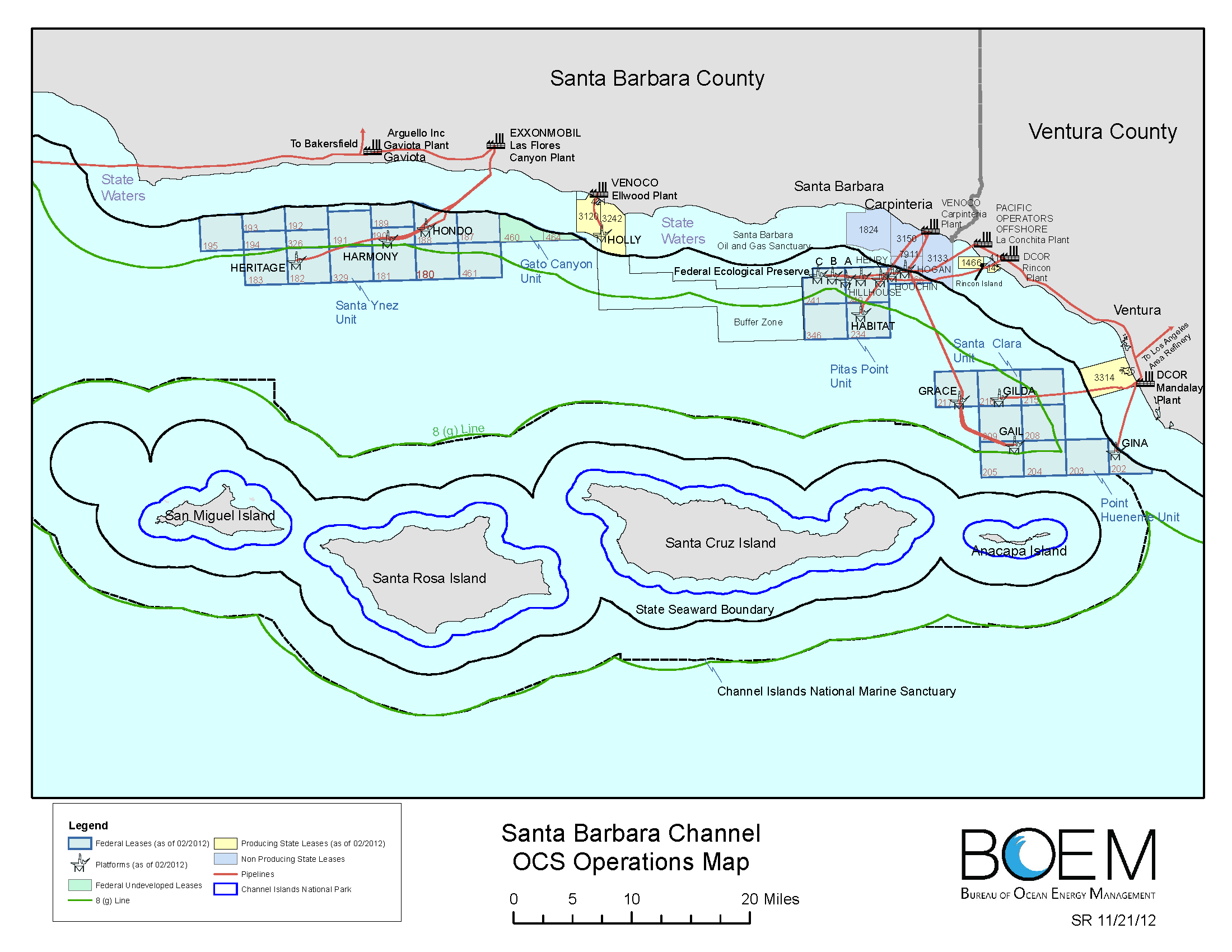
Offshore oil and gas facilities in the Santa Barbara Channel

The issue of state versus federal ownership has a long and contentious history. The US Supreme Court ruled in 1947 that the federal government owned all the seabed off the California coast. However, the US Congress passed the Outer Continental Shelf Act in 1953, which recognized state ownership of the seabed within 3 nautical miles (6 km) of the shore.

In some cases, the state granted ownership of offshore seabed to the adjacent municipalities. In this way Long Beach was granted ownership of Long Beach Harbor in 1911. When the Wilmington field was discovered, Long Beach contracted with oil companies to produce oil from the city-owned offshore part of the field.

== Offshore development ==
Oil production began from a man-made offshore island off Seal Beach in 1953. The first strictly offshore oil field in California was the Belmont Offshore Field, discovered in 1948 1.6 miles (2.6 km) from the shore of Seal Beach; production did not begin until 1954 when a man-made island was built in 40 feet of water for drilling and production equipment.

The first of ten federal offshore lease sales in California was held in 1963.

== Santa Barbara spill and aftermath ==
The Union Oil Company discovered the Dos Cuadras oil field in federal waters of the Santa Barbara Channel in 1968 but in 1969 large quantities of oil began escaping to the sea floor near a drilling well in the field. The resulting oil slick came ashore along 35 miles (56 km) of coastline in Santa Barbara County, and turned public opinion against offshore drilling in California. In response to the oil spill, US Secretary of the Interior Walter Hickel removed 53 square miles (140 km^{2}) of federal tracts near Santa Barbara from oil and gas leasing.

=== Halting new offshore leasing ===
California, like other states, owns and controls the mineral resources within 3 nautical miles (6 km) of the coast. Leasing California state seabed is controlled by the California State Lands Commission, which halted further leasing of state offshore tracts after the Santa Barbara oil spill in 1969. In 1994 the California legislature codified the ban on new leases by passing the California Coastal Sanctuary Act, which prohibited new leasing of state offshore tracts.

The federal government continued to hold offshore lease sales through 1982. Then the US Congress directed that no federal funds be used to lease additional federal tracts off the coast of California. Congress repeated the moratorium on new leases every year until September 2008, when an appropriations bill passed the House and Senate without the ban; however, no federal lease sales have been proposed for offshore California since the ban was lifted.

A lawsuit by the state of California prevented the federal government from allowing development on 36 federal leases issued before the congressional moratorium. The federal government voided 29 of the contested leases by repaying $1.1 million in lease bonuses; the seven additional federal leases have not been resolved, but remain inactive because of the litigation. The Minerals Management Service estimates that the seven undeveloped leases contain 1,000,000,000 barrels (0.16 km^{3}) of recoverable oil and 500,000,000,000 cubic feet (14 km^{3}) of recoverable gas.

In 1990, President George H. W. Bush issued an executive moratorium banning new federal leasing through the year 2000 in many offshore areas, including California. In 1998, President Bill Clinton extended the moratorium through 2012. In July 2008, President George W. Bush rescinded the executive order.

=== Tranquillon Ridge field ===
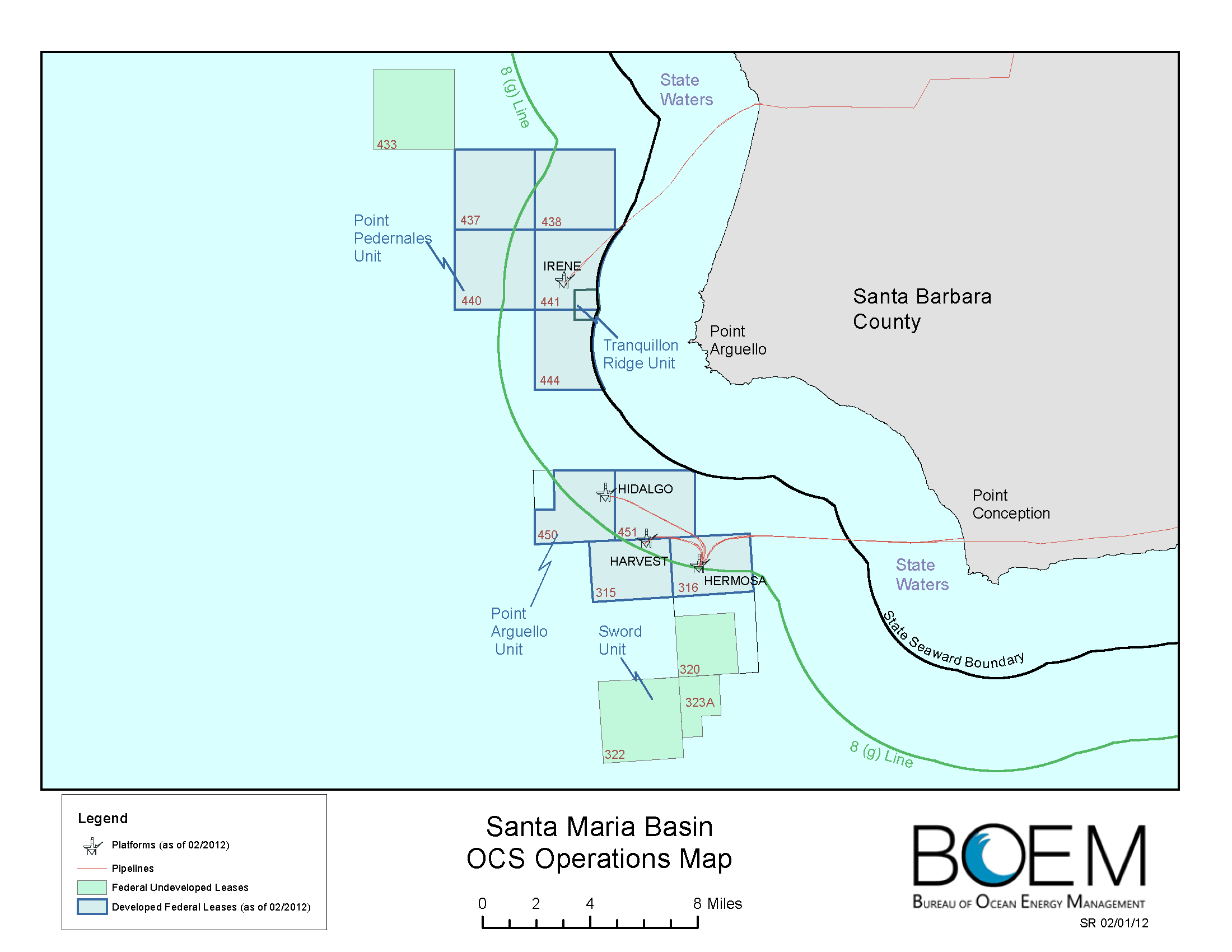
Offshore oil and gas facilities off Point Arguello, California

Although leasing in state waters has been prohibited since 1994, the law allows exceptions when petroleum under state lands is being drained by nearby wells on non-state tracts; no such exceptions have been made to date. In 2008 both Plains Exploration & Production (PXP) and ExxonMobil offered competing proposals to the state to drill wells into Tranquillon Ridge field, offshore Santa Barbara County. The Tranquillon Ridge field lies partly in state and partly in federal waters. Neither proposal entailed additional offshore surface structures. Plains proposed to drill wells directionally from their existing Irene Platform in federal waters. ExxonMobil proposed to drill directionally from wells onshore in Vandenberg Air Force Base. The Plains Exploration proposal was endorsed by the Environmental Defense Center and by Get Oil Out! On 29 January 2009 the State Lands Commission denied the applications by a 2-1 vote. The reason given for the denial was that "approving the lease request would send a message that additional drilling is possible off the California coast."

In July 2009 Governor Arnold Schwarzenegger proposed allowing oil production from the state portion of Tranquillon Ridge field, as a way to increase state revenue, which would include a $100 million up-front payment to the state. The provision was defeated in the state legislature. On 3 May 2010, governor Schwarzenegger, reacting to the Deepwater Horizon oil spill, withdrew his support for the Tranquillon Ridge drilling plan, stating, "I see on TV the birds drenched in oil, the fishermen out of work, the massive oil spill and oil slick destroying our precious ecosystem."

== Current status ==
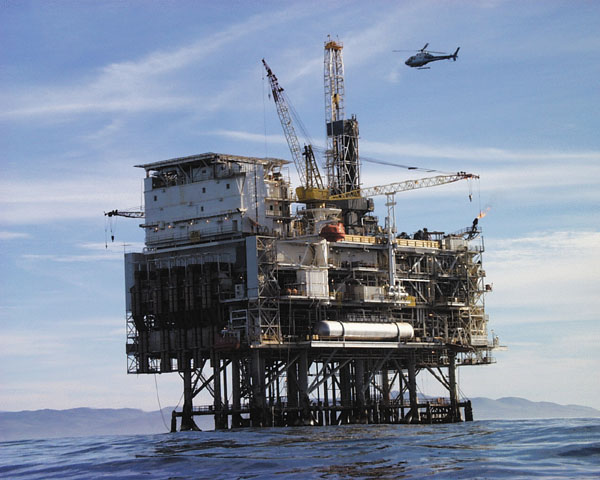
Platform Harvest, in the Point Arguello field in federal waters 7 miles (11 km) from Point Conception, has produced more than 73,000,000 barrels (12,000,000 m^{3}) of oil and 50,000,000,000 cubic feet (1.4 km^{3}) gas.

Despite the long-term bans on new leasing in state (since 1969) and federal waters (since 1984), drilling and production have continued on existing leases, from existing drilling and production platforms.

Nine active offshore drilling and production locations remain in state and municipal waters: one platform and one artificial island in the Santa Barbara Channel, and four artificial islands and three platforms from the offshore portion of the Wilmington Oil Field in San Pedro Bay/Long Beach Harbor. The first artificial offshore island, for Belmont Offshore Field, was removed in 1999.

As of 2020, there is substantial offshore oil and gas production. Twenty seven platforms lie along the Southern California coast from Huntington Beach to Point Conception in Santa Barbara County. Twenty-three offshore drilling and production platforms are in federal waters at depths that range from 100 to 1,200 feet. As of 2009 they produce 22 million barrels of oil and 21 billion cubic feet of gas per year. Four reside in state waters. Many of the platforms have been in place for 30 to 50 years and are not currently producing enough oil to make them worth maintaining.

== Decommissioning Oil Platforms ==
Of the 23 oil platforms surrounding the coast of California, eight are no longer in usage or, due to terminated leases, are not allowed to resume production. The unused oil and gas platforms are in line for decommissioning in the near future. Along with these already abandoned oil platforms, the remaining facilities are expected to also require decommissioning as they reach 30-50 years in production.

As of 2021, the Biden Administration announced that an environmental analysis would be conducted to establish the effects of complete or partial decommissioning of oil and gas platforms. The federal investigation, headed by the BSEE, will review oil facilities and platforms off of the Southern California coast and, subsequently, direct future action towards these offshore oil platforms.

The oil platforms are surrounded by various species of fish and wildlife, topical to California, that could be impacted by the complete removal of the platform structure. Thus, alternative methods have been discussed and reviewed in place of traditional decommissioning. This includes the Rigs-to Reefs program that proposes to only partially remove parts of the oil platform, keeping a majority of the habitat intact for the wildlife.

== Future potential ==
Several large, undeveloped offshore oil fields have been discovered; see first map in this article. Seven undeveloped leases are estimated to contain one billion barrels (0.16 km^{3}) of recoverable oil and 500 billion cubic feet (14 km^{3}) of recoverable gas. The total potential petroleum resource in offshore central California may be 4 to 6 billion bbls oil and 5 to 7 trillion cubic feet of gas, per 1996 estimates by USGS and MMS.

Most of these fields are north of Point Conception and are heavy oil. Some of these oil reserves could be produced by directional drilling from existing platforms. As of 2014, political issues have prevented new development, but these fields contain a large and significant resource for the future.

In 2020, the Trump administration had a proposal under development to outline potential sales near Southern California and other coastal areas of the United States.

== See also ==
- California oil and gas industry
- Offshore oil and gas in the United States
- Offshore oil drilling
- Oil platform
- Rigs-to-Reefs
- US offshore drilling debate
