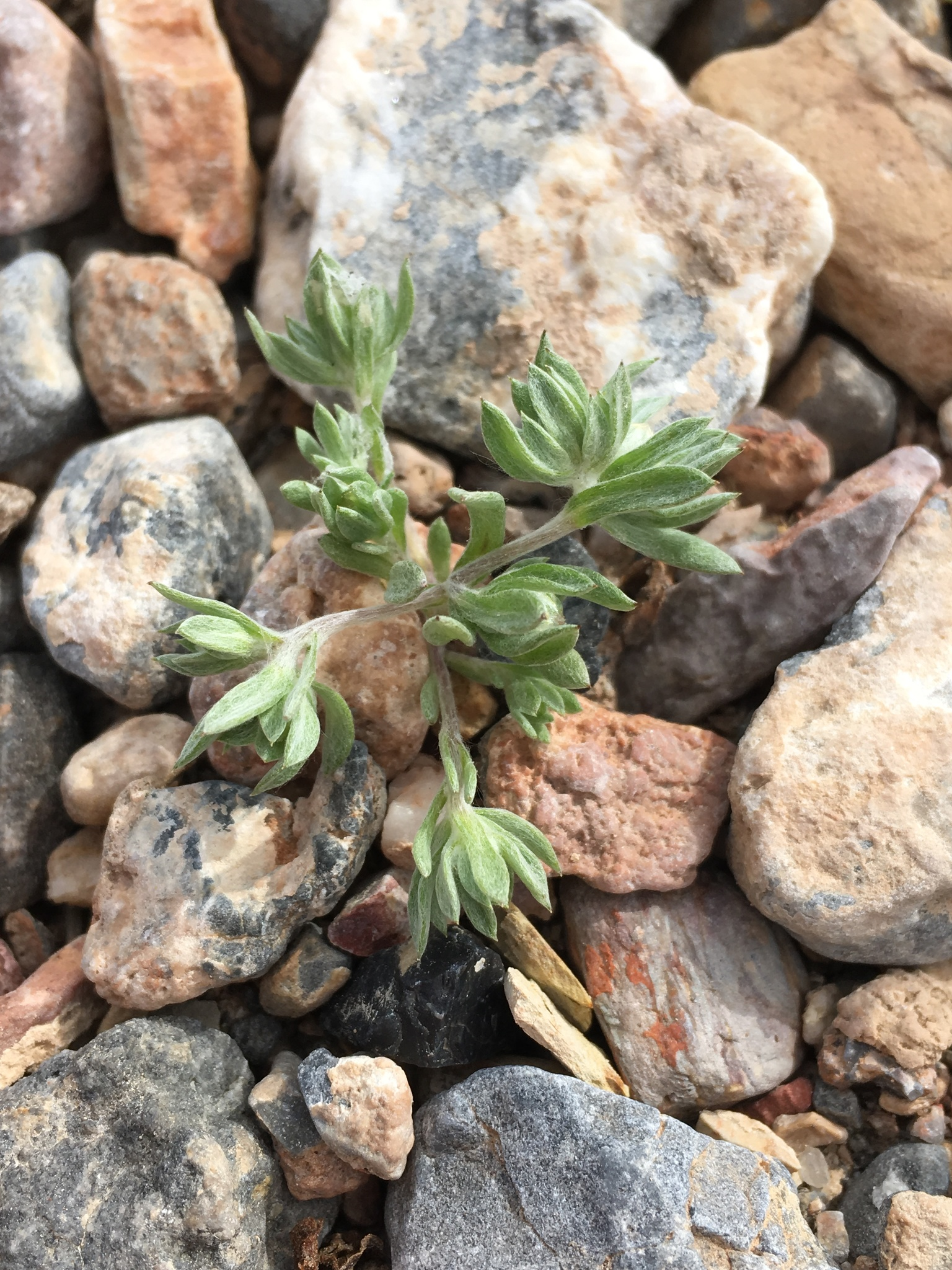

Scientific classification
- Kingdom: Plantae
- Clade: Tracheophytes
- Clade: Angiosperms
- Clade: Eudicots
- Clade: Asterids
- Order: Asterales
- Family: Asteraceae
- Genus: Stylocline
- Species: S. intertexta

Binomial name
- Stylocline intertexta Morefield

= Stylocline intertexta =

Species of plant

Stylocline intertexta is a species of flowering plant in the family Asteraceae known by the common names Morefield's neststraw and Mojave neststraw. It is native to the Mojave and Sonoran Deserts of California, Nevada, Utah, and Arizona, where it grows in rocky, sandy desert soils. It likely evolved as a hybrid between woollyhead neststraw (Stylocline micropoides) and baretwig neststraw (S. psilocarphoides); it is a mix of their morphological traits and it occurs alongside both of them. It reproduces itself, producing fertile offspring, and it meets other criteria for any other definition of a species, so it was described to science as such in 1992. It is a small annual herb growing at ground level and reaching just a few centimeters in length. It is usually coated in white hairs, often woolly. The small, pointed leaves are oval to lance-shaped and measure up to 1.5 centimeters long. The inflorescence bears spherical flower heads each a few millimeters in diameter. The head has no phyllaries, just a ball of tiny woolly white flowers.
