= Neststraw =

Neststraw is a common name for several plants and may refer to:

- Ancistrocarphus
- Stylocline
