= H. acaulis =

H. acaulis may refer to:

- Helvella acaulis, a plant pathogen species
- Hesperevax acaulis, a daisy species
- Hymenoxys acaulis, a rubberweed species in the genus Hymenoxys
