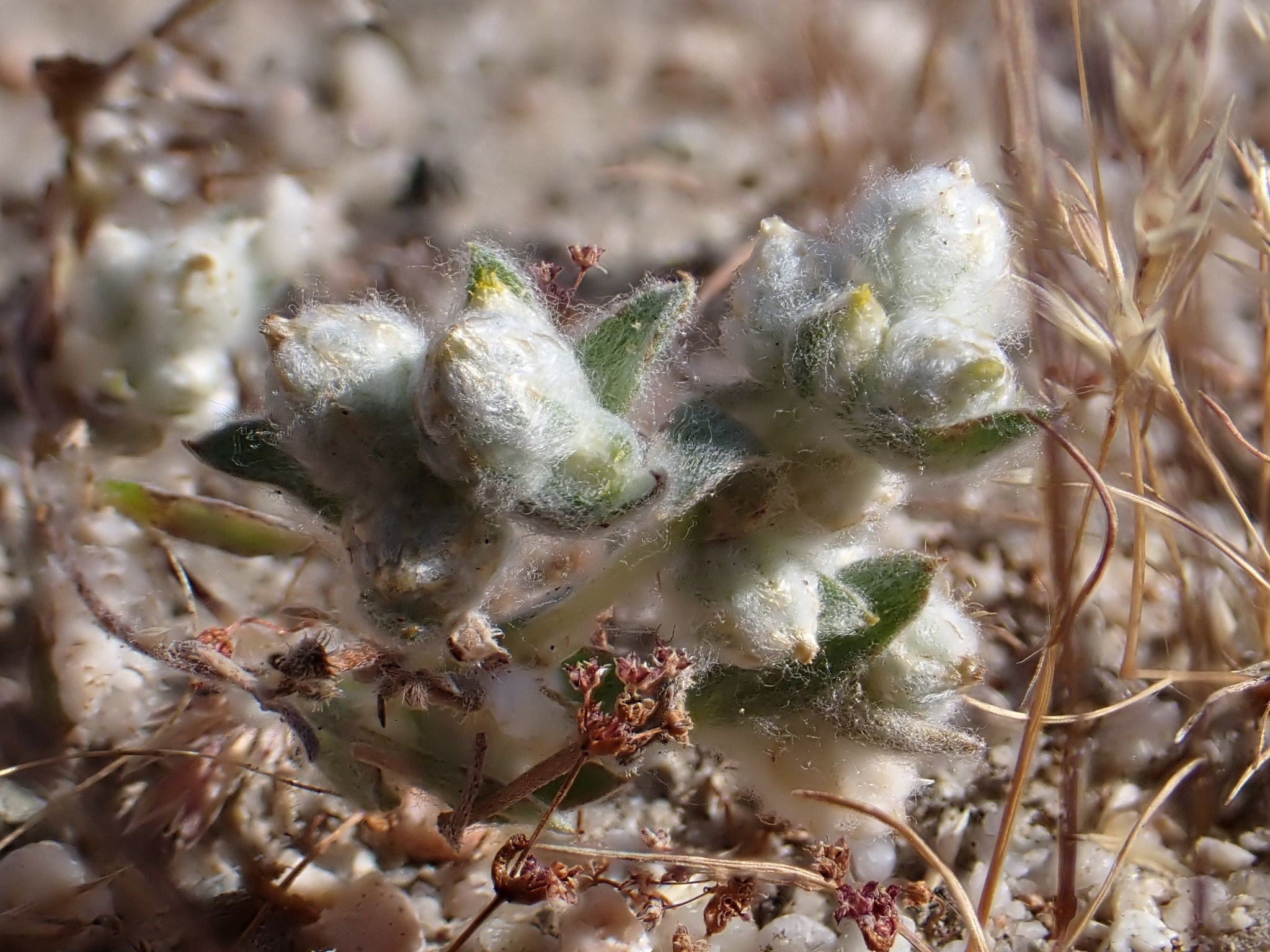

Conservation status
- Imperiled (NatureServe)

Scientific classification
- Kingdom: Plantae
- Clade: Tracheophytes
- Clade: Angiosperms
- Clade: Eudicots
- Clade: Asterids
- Order: Asterales
- Family: Asteraceae
- Genus: Stylocline
- Species: S. citroleum

Binomial name
- Stylocline citroleum Morefield

= Stylocline citroleum =

Species of flowering plant in the family Asteraceae

Stylocline citroleum is a rare species of flowering plant in the family Asteraceae known by the common name oil neststraw.

== Description ==
This inconspicuous annual herb produces a grayish, trailing, forking stem no more than 13 centimeters (5.1 in) long. The grayish, woolly, pointed leaves are up to 1.4 centimeters (0.55 in) long. The inflorescence bears spherical flower heads just a few millimeters long with tiny, rough-haired phyllaries and scaly, woolly florets. It is hard to tell apart from other Stylocline because its defining characteristics are microscopic.

== Distribution ==
It is endemic to Kern County, California, where it is known from about 46 occurrences on and around the Elk Hills Oil Field. The occurrences are patchy and variable in size, and some sources consider them to be part of a single widely spread metapopulation. The species has been collected from coastal San Diego County, but any occurrences there are probably now extirpated.

The plant has been known for over one hundred years, and the type specimen was collected in 1935, but it was not described to science as a distinct species until 1992.

Stylocline citroleum grows in the valley saltbush scrub ecosystem in the sandy flats and clay soils of the San Joaquin Valley in areas developed into oil fields, the inspiration for the common and scientific names of the species. The plant probably evolved as a hybrid of mountain neststraw (Stylocline gnaphaloides) and California filago (Filago californica), and it is almost always found growing alongside one or both of its parent species.
