= Stylocline masonii =

Scientific classification
- Kingdom: Plantae
- Clade: Tracheophytes
- Clade: Angiosperms
- Clade: Eudicots
- Clade: Asterids
- Order: Asterales
- Family: Asteraceae
- Genus: Stylocline
- Species: S. masonii

Binomial name
- Stylocline masonii Morefield

Species of plant

Stylocline masonii is an uncommon species of flowering plant in the family Asteraceae known by the common name Mason's neststraw.

== Description ==
Stylocline masonii is a small, inconspicuous plant that can only be identified with certainty during its flowering period, which occurs for two to four weeks during wet years. It is an annual herb growing at ground level and reaching just a few centimeters in length. It is usually coated in white hairs, often woolly. The leaves are no longer than 11 millimeters in length.

The inflorescence bears cylindrical, oval, or nearly spherical flower heads each 2 to 5 millimeters. The head generally has no phyllaries, just a ball of tiny woolly white flowers.

== Distribution ==
It is endemic to California, where it is known from scattered small occurrences between Monterey and Los Angeles Counties. It grows in various types of sandy habitat. It is similar to baretwig neststraw (Stylocline psilocarphoides) and was taxonomically separated from it in 1992.
