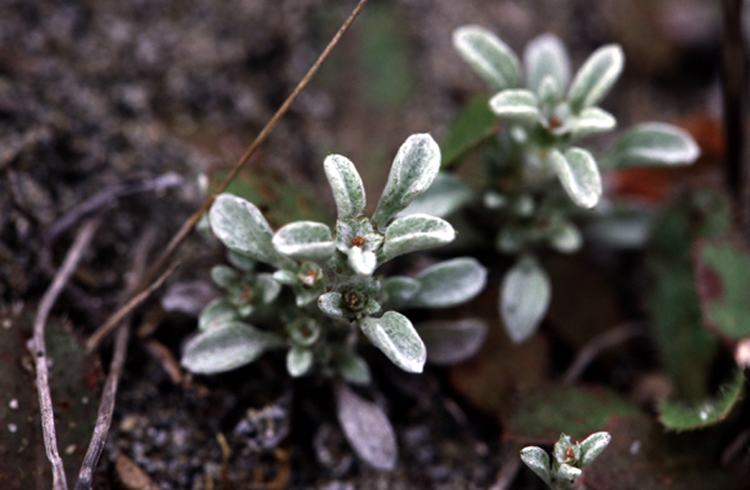
- Hesperevax sparsiflora var. brevifolia

Scientific classification
- Kingdom: Plantae
- Clade: Tracheophytes
- Clade: Angiosperms
- Clade: Eudicots
- Clade: Asterids
- Order: Asterales
- Family: Asteraceae
- Genus: Hesperevax
- Species: H. sparsiflora

Binomial name
- Hesperevax sparsiflora (Gray) Greene

= Hesperevax sparsiflora =

Species of flowering plant

Hesperevax sparsiflora is a species of flowering plant in the family Asteraceae known by the common name erect dwarf cudweed. It is native to California and Oregon, where it grows in several habitat types including sandy coastal areas and the serpentine soils of inland hills. This is a small woolly annual herb reaching maximum heights under 18 centimeters. It has oval to rounded or scoop-shaped leaves on short petioles which vary in morphology across varieties. Small flower heads appear between the leaves. They contain greenish or whitish disc florets.These florets are remarkably small, each being only 1/120th of an inch (0.2 millimeter) in width, and numbering 5 to 9 in the whole disc, which totals only 1/ 6th inch (3.8 mm) in width including bracts. This is the world's smallest composite inflorescence.

There are two varieties:

- Hesperevax sparsiflora. var. brevifolia (short-leaved evax) is an uncommon coastal variety with leaves generally under a centimeter long
- Hesperevax sparsiflora var. sparsiflora is a longer-leaved variety which is more common but limited to California
