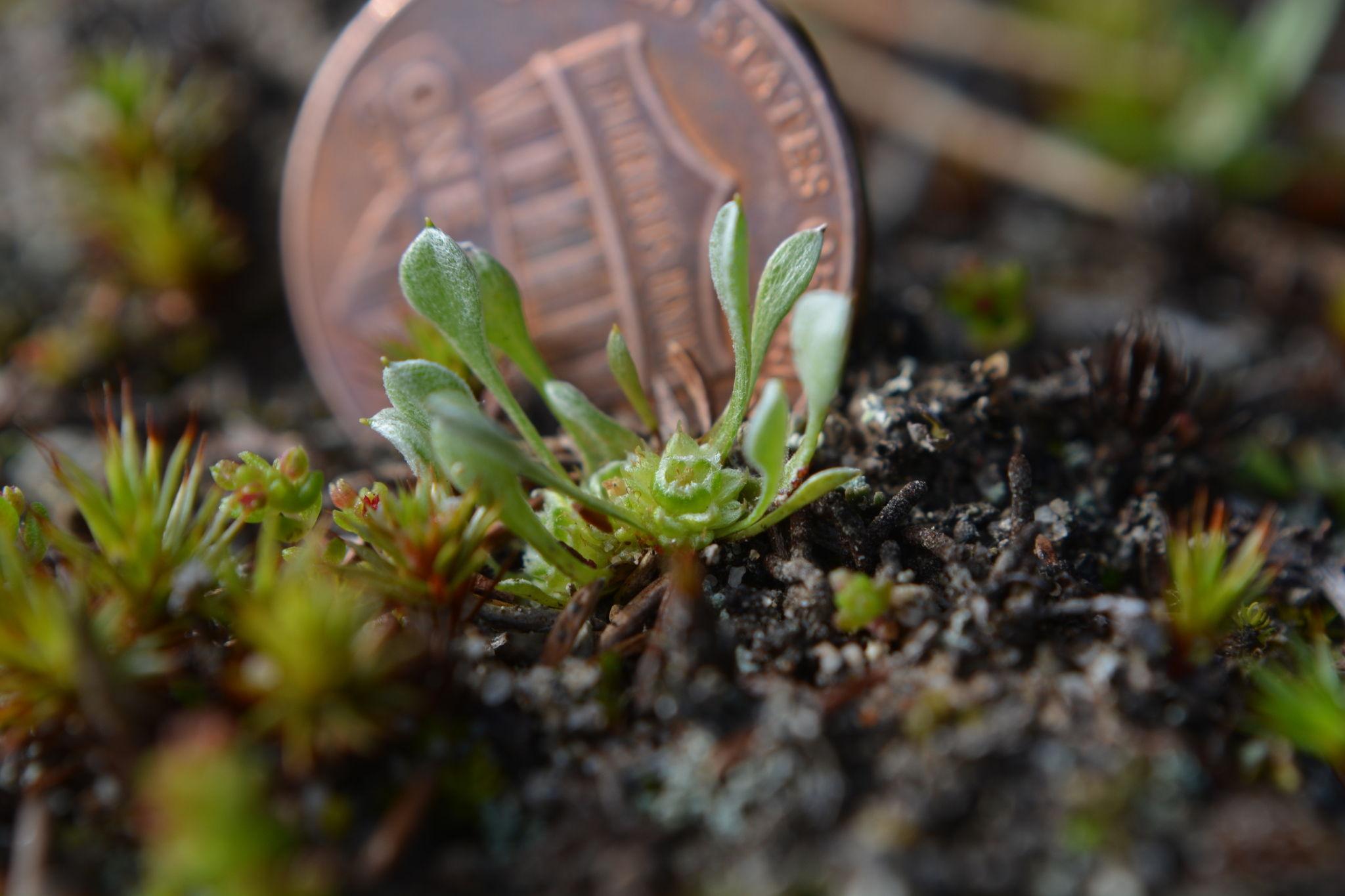

Conservation status
- Critically Imperiled (NatureServe)

Scientific classification
- Kingdom: Plantae
- Clade: Tracheophytes
- Clade: Angiosperms
- Clade: Eudicots
- Clade: Asterids
- Order: Asterales
- Family: Asteraceae
- Genus: Ancistrocarphus
- Species: A. keilii

Binomial name
- Ancistrocarphus keilii Morefield

= Ancistrocarphus keilii =

Species of flowering plant

Ancistrocarphus keilii is a rare species of flowering plant known by the common name Santa Ynez groundstar. It is endemic to Santa Barbara County, California, where it is known only from three populations in the Santa Ynez River drainage. There were 180 individuals estimated in existence, until 2023, when a few thousand bloomed. The plant was described to science in 2004.

Ancistrocarphus keilii grows in sandy soils in chaparral habitat adjacent to oak woodlands. The plant is considered to be vulnerable to extinction because of its rarity, its populations are located in habitat that is likely to be disturbed or developed, and because it apparently has no effective method of biological dispersal. The plant was photographed for the first time (and was collected for the first time for deposit in herbaria) at a protected site on Vandenberg Space Force Base, in cooperation with the staff botanist.

== Description ==
This is a petite and easily overlooked annual herb. There is no stem, just a small rosette of spoon-shaped leaves no more than 1 or 2 centimeters long. The leaf blades are borne on petioles with thin, expanded bases that surround the inflorescence. There is one flower head 2 or 3 millimeters long which is hidden amidst the leaf bases. The tiny achene generally germinates directly next to its parent, so that the plants become a carpetlike layer.

The species is named in honor of California botanist David John Keil (1946-).
