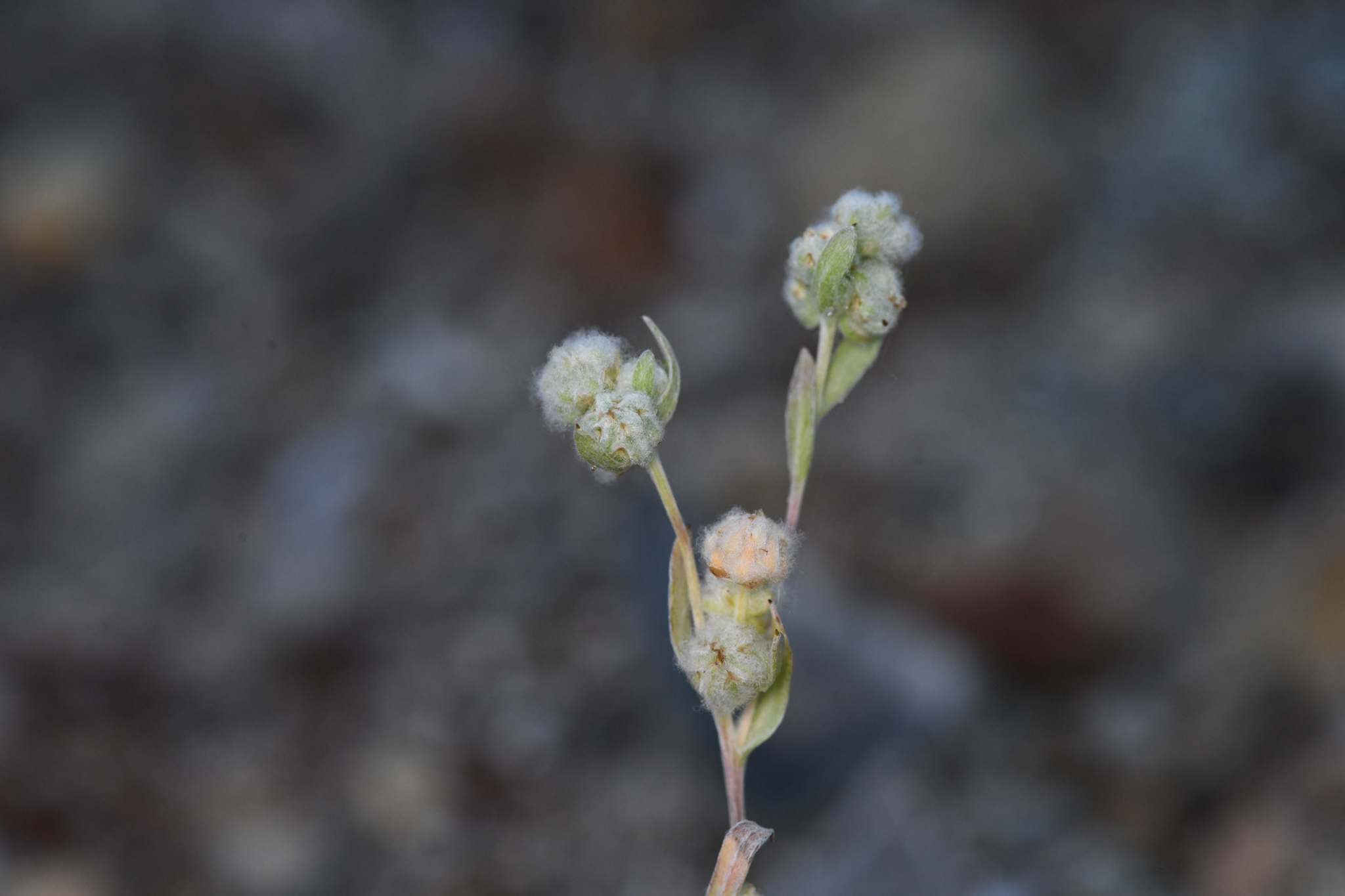

Scientific classification
- Kingdom: Plantae
- Clade: Tracheophytes
- Clade: Angiosperms
- Clade: Eudicots
- Clade: Asterids
- Order: Asterales
- Family: Asteraceae
- Genus: Micropus
- Species: M. amphibolus

Binomial name
- Micropus amphibolus A.Gray

= Micropus amphibolus =

Species of flowering plant

Micropus amphibolus is a species of flowering plant in the family Asteraceae known by the common name Mount Diablo cottonseed.

It is endemic to California, where it is known from the San Francisco Bay Area and nearby mountains, growing in open, rocky habitat. It is an annual herb similar in appearance to its relative, Micropus californicus, called the "Q-tips".

It produces one or more small, erect stems coated thinly in wispy, and webby fibers. The inflorescence is a spherical flower head a few millimeters wide, which resembles a tiny cotton boll since the flowers and maturing fruits are very woolly.
