= California Resources Corporation =

American oil company

- Type: Public
- Traded as: NYSE: CRC; S&P 600 Component
- Industry: Petroleum industry
- Founded: April 2014; 12 years ago
- Headquarters: Long Beach, California
- Key people: Mark A. (Mac) McFarland (chairman); Francisco J. Leon (CEO)
- Products: Petroleum; Natural Gas; Natural Gas Liquids
- Production output: 100 thousand barrels of oil equivalent (610,000 GJ) per day (2021)
- Revenue: ▲US$3.67 billion (2025)
- Net income: ▼US$363 million (2025)
- Number of employees: 970 (2021)
- Website: crc.com

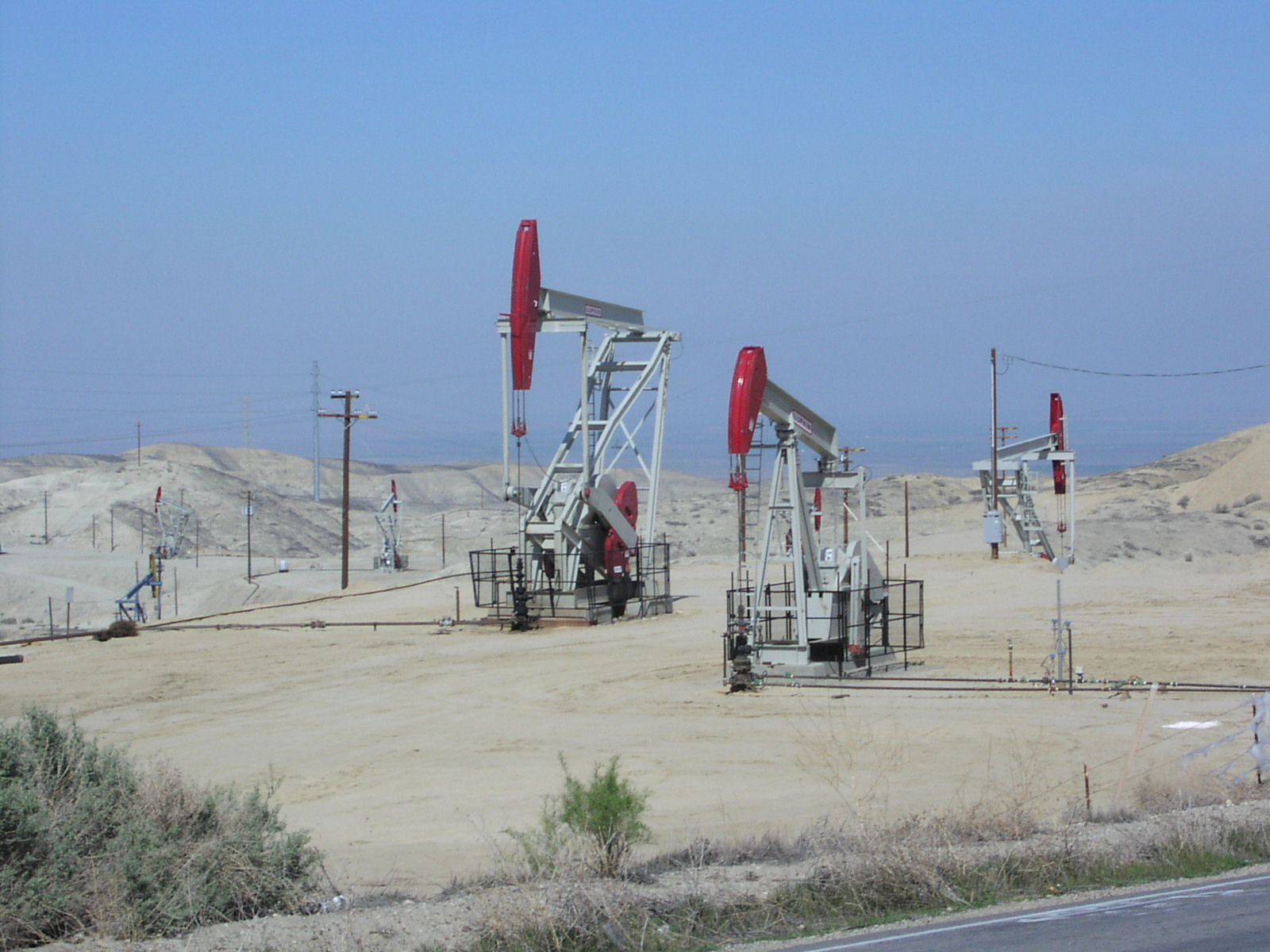
Three active oil wells (using nodding donkeys) in Elk Hills Oil Field, south of Buttonwillow, California

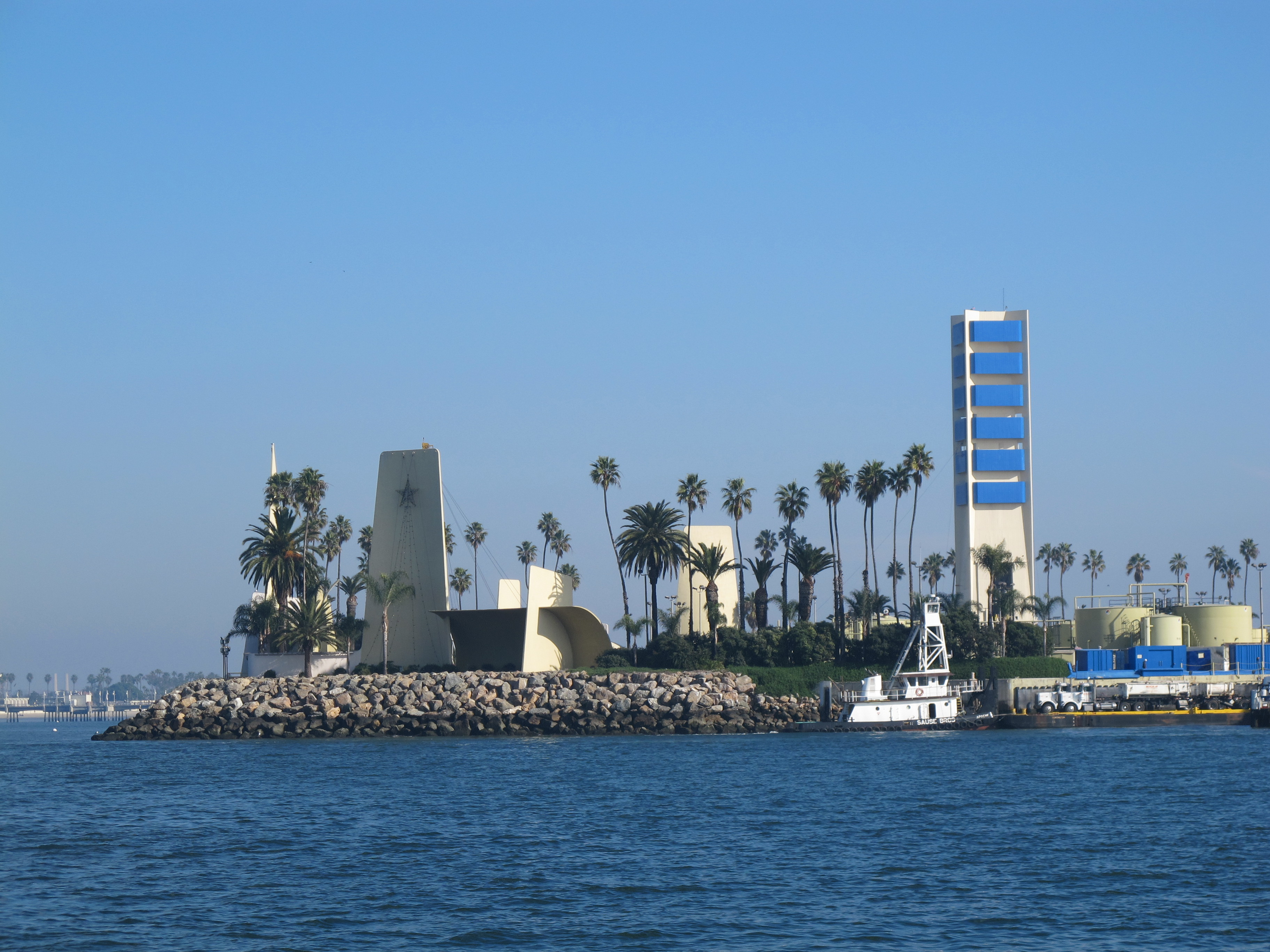
THUMS Islands oil island White in 2010

California Resources Corporation is an American energy corporation engaged in hydrocarbon exploration in California. It is organized in Delaware and headquartered in Long Beach, California. Its mineral acreage holdings in California constitute the largest privately held position in the state.

The company has conventional primary, enhanced oil recovery, and unconventional operations in the San Joaquin Basin, Ventura Basin, and Los Angeles Basin and dry gas production in the Sacramento Basin. Its largest holding is the 47,000-acre Elk Hills Oil Field, 20 miles west of Bakersfield, California in the San Joaquin Valley. It is also operates the Wilmington Oil Field in partnership with California, several smaller fields in Los Angeles County, and the Huntington Beach Oil Field in Orange County, California. As of December 31, 2021, the company had 480 million barrels of oil equivalent (2.9×10^{9} GJ) of estimated proved reserves, of which 71% was petroleum, 20% was natural gas, and 9% was natural gas liquids.

== History ==
The company was formed in April 2014 as a corporate spin-off of Occidental Petroleum. In April 2018, the company acquired the interest in the Elk Hills Oil Field previously held by Chevron Corporation for $460 million and 2.85 million shares. In July 2020, the company filed bankruptcy with $5 billion in debt; it emerged from bankruptcy in October 2020. In March 2021, Mark A. (“Mac”) McFarland was appointed CEO. The company benefited financially from the 2021 Texas power crisis. In February, 2024, it announced a $2.1 billion, all-stock purchase agreement for Aera Energy.
