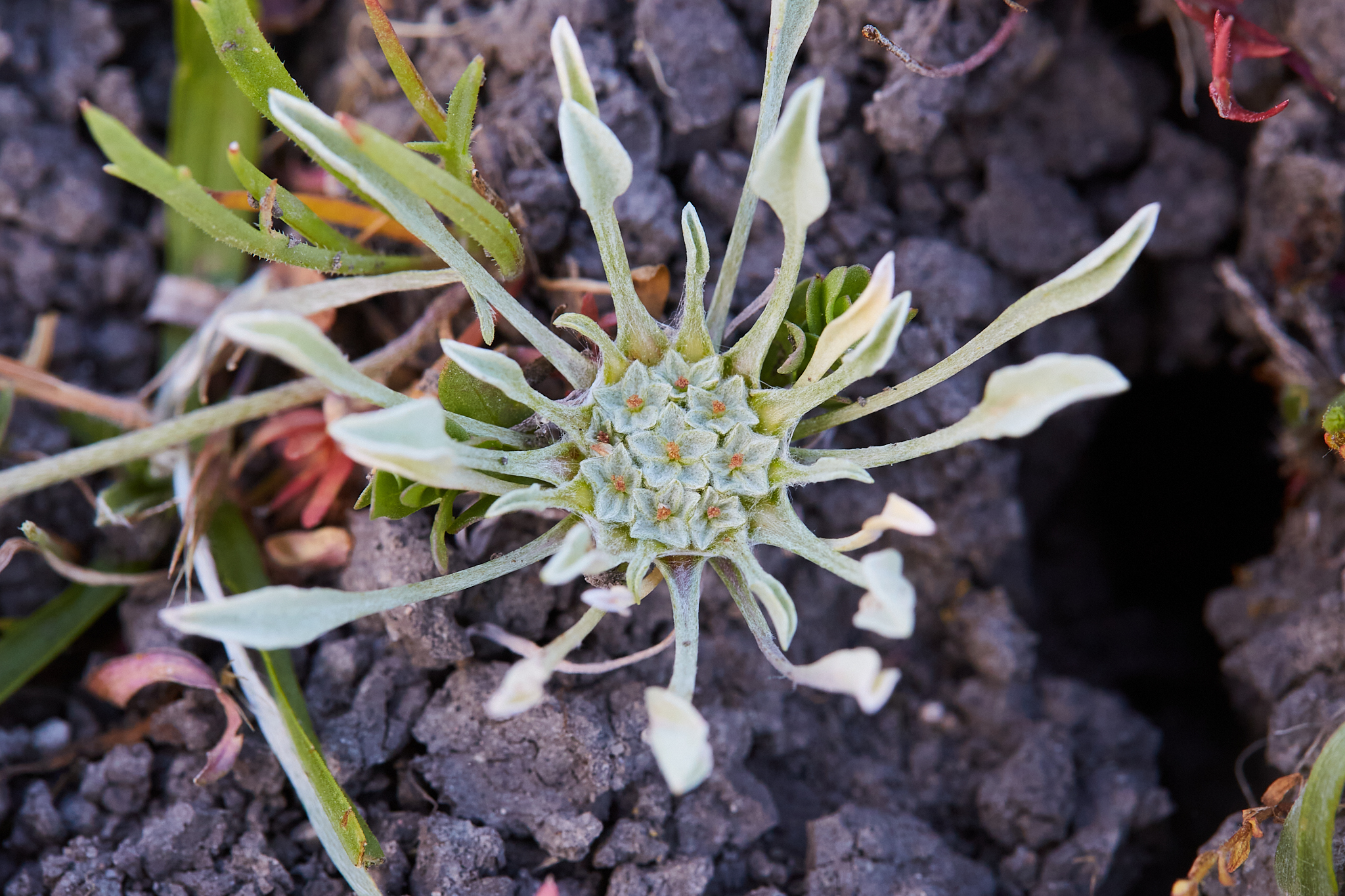

Scientific classification
- Kingdom: Plantae
- Clade: Tracheophytes
- Clade: Angiosperms
- Clade: Eudicots
- Clade: Asterids
- Order: Asterales
- Family: Asteraceae
- Genus: Hesperevax
- Species: H. caulescens

Binomial name
- Hesperevax caulescens (Benth.) Gray

= Hesperevax caulescens =

Species of flowering plant

Hesperevax caulescens is a small flowering plant in the family Asteraceae. One common name for the plant is hogwallow starfish, as it is a somewhat flat, star-shaped plant which grows in mud. Another common name is dwarf dwarf-cudweed, as the three members of genus Hesperevax are known as dwarf-cudweeds and this species is smaller than the others. It may also be called involucrate evax, since its former Latin name was Evax involucrata. This annual plant is a member of the vernal pool plant community in California, where it is possibly an endemic species, although its range might extend into Baja California. The hogwallow starfish radiates pale green spoon-shaped leaves in a basal rosette and extends a short erect stem. The flowers are less than two millimeters wide. This species grows along the outskirts of vernal pools in areas which have dried.
