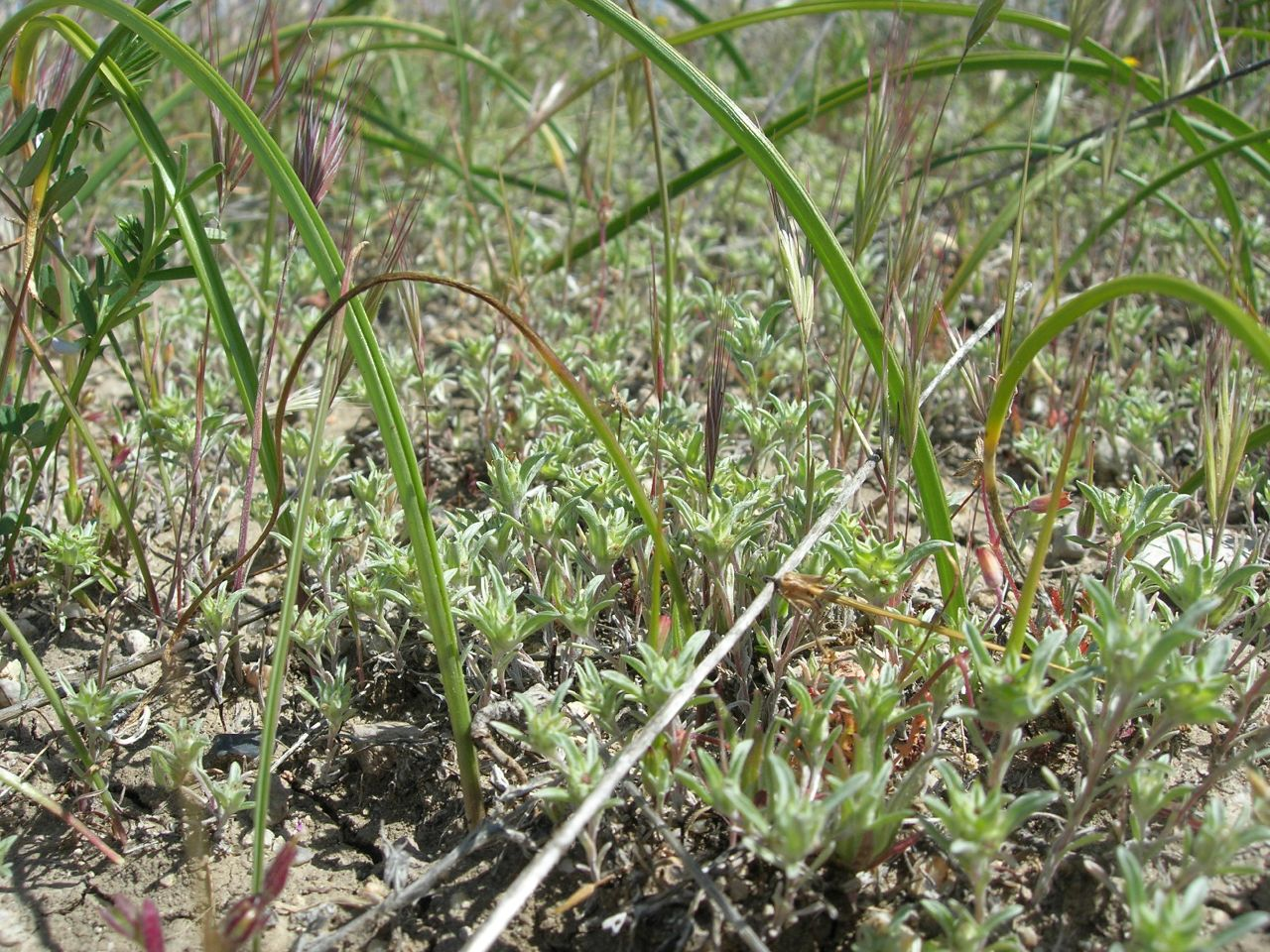
- Ancistrocarphus filagineus (small tufted plants)

Scientific classification
- Kingdom: Plantae
- Clade: Tracheophytes
- Clade: Angiosperms
- Clade: Eudicots
- Clade: Asterids
- Order: Asterales
- Family: Asteraceae
- Subfamily: Asteroideae
- Tribe: Gnaphalieae
- Genus: Ancistrocarphus; A.Gray

Synonyms
- Stylocline sect. Ancistrocarphus (A. Gray) A. Gray

= Ancistrocarphus =

Genus of flowering plants

Ancistrocarphus is a genus of flowering plants in the family Asteraceae. It contains two known species, both native to western North America. These plants are often treated as members of the genus Stylocline, but they are not as closely related to Stylocline species as they are to plants of other genera, especially Hesperevax.

The better-known species in this genus is Ancistrocarphus filagineus, which is known by the common names woolly fishhooks and false neststraw. It is usually found in Idaho, Oregon, Nevada, California, and Baja California. It is a woolly annual herb growing in a squat patch on the ground. The other species is Ancistrocarphus keilii, a rare and poorly known California endemic not described until 2004.
