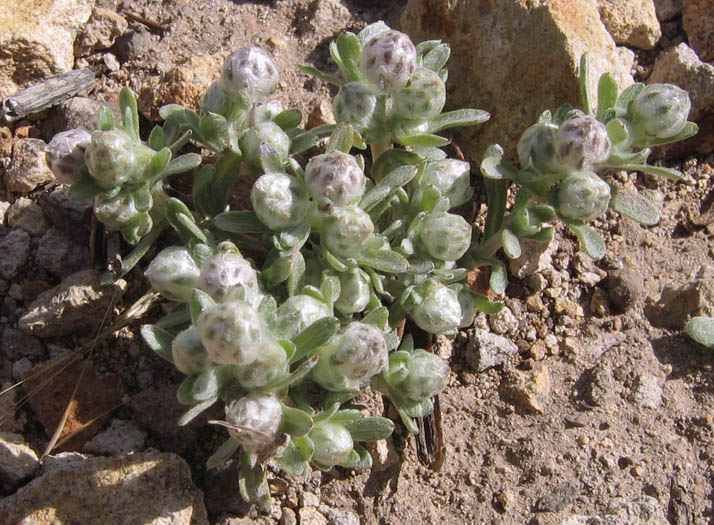

Scientific classification
- Kingdom: Plantae
- Clade: Tracheophytes
- Clade: Angiosperms
- Clade: Eudicots
- Clade: Asterids
- Order: Asterales
- Family: Asteraceae
- Genus: Stylocline
- Species: S. gnaphaloides

Binomial name
- Stylocline gnaphaloides Nutt.

= Stylocline gnaphaloides =

Species of plant

Stylocline gnaphaloides (often misspelled S. gnaphalioides) is a species of flowering plant in the aster family known by the common names mountain neststraw and everlasting neststraw.

== Distribution ==
The plant is native to southern California and Arizona in the southwestern United States; and to Baja California and Sonora in northwestern Mexico. It can be found in many types of habitat, becoming common in some areas.

== Description ==
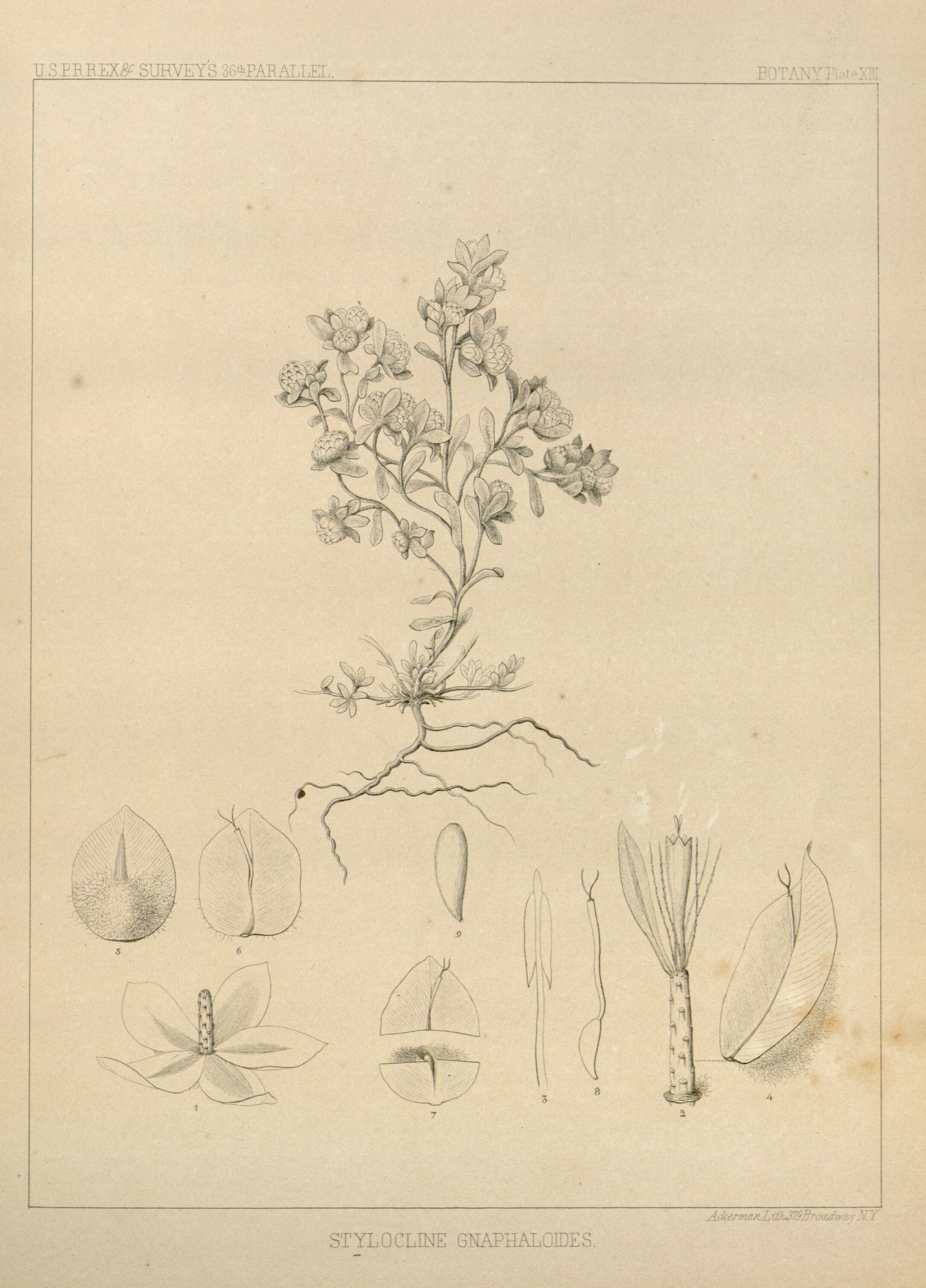
Illustration of S. gnaphaloides.

Stylocline gnaphaloides is a small annual herb growing at ground level and reaching just a few centimeters in length. It is usually coated in white hairs, often woolly. The small, blunt leaves are alternately arranged, each up to 1.4 centimeters long.

The inflorescence bears spherical flower heads each a few millimeters in diameter. The head has 2 to 4 white-haired phyllaries and tiny woolly white flowers.
