= THUMS Islands =

Four artificial islands in San Pedro Bay, California

Coordinates: 33.74079°N 118.16257°W

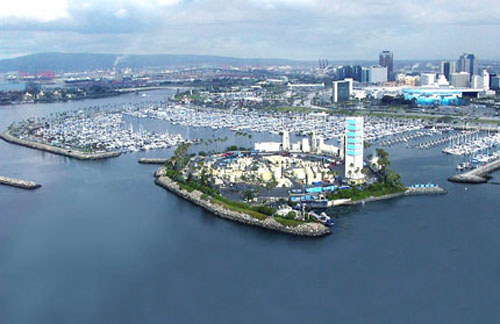
Island Grissom, one of the THUMS Islands, the closest to land and most camouflaged

The THUMS Islands are a set of four artificial islands in San Pedro Bay off the coast of Long Beach, California. The THUMS Islands were built in 1965 to tap into the East Wilmington Oil Field. The landscaping and sound walls were designed to camouflage the operation and reduce noise, and they are the only decorated oil islands in the United States. The islands were named for the company who bid for original operating contract, THUMS, a consortium named after its parent companies: Texaco, Humble, Unocal, Mobil, and Shell.

Since 1967, they have also been known as the Astronaut Islands, each individual island having been named in honor of an American astronaut who lost their lives in the service of NASA. Island Freeman (Theodore C. "Ted" Freeman) is named for the first astronaut to perish in active duty (piloting a T-38 Talon jet trainer). Islands Chaffee (Roger B. Chaffee), Grissom (Virgil I. "Gus" Grissom) and White (Ed White) are named after the Apollo 1 astronauts killed in a launch pad accident.

== History ==
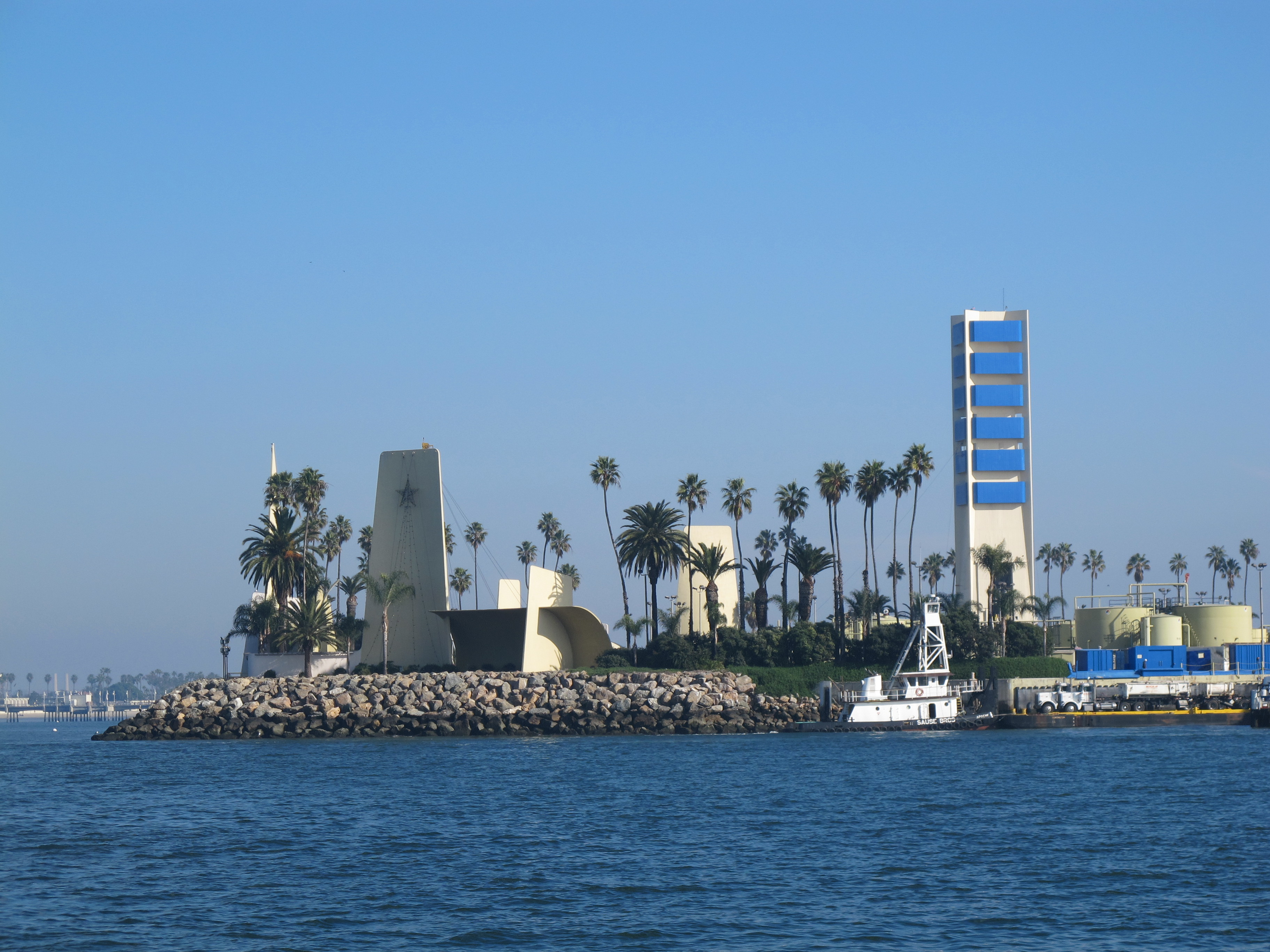
Island White, 2010

After a 1964 court case that gave the state of California mineral rights to the area, the islands were built at an estimated cost of $22 million in 1965. The islands were operated by THUMS, a consortium named after the parent companies who bid for the island contract: Texaco, Humble, Union Oil, Mobil, and Shell. The rim of the islands are made of 640,000 tons of boulders from Catalina Island, and the islands were then filled with 3.2 million cubic yards of dredged material from the bay. The islands contain significant landscaping, a waterfall, and tall structures concealing the drilling rigs, including one known as The Condo and sometimes mistaken for a hotel by those on land. The structures are lit by colored lights at night. The aesthetic mitigation cost $10 million at time of construction, and was overseen by theme park architect Joseph Linesch. They were described by a Los Angeles Times writer as "part Disney, part Jetsons, part Swiss Family Robinson".

In 1975, the state of California and the city of Long Beach sued the THUMS oil companies for artificially depressing oil prices. A federal jury cleared Exxon of all charges, and the other four oil companies settled out of court for "hundreds of millions of dollars".

A peak of 148,495 barrels per day (23,608.8 m^{3}/d) were produced in 1969. 300 million barrels (48,000,000 m^{3}) of oil were pumped from THUMS by 1974, the 500 millionth barrel of crude oil was pumped in 1980. By 1992, the pumping volume was 44,444 barrels (7,066.0 m^{3}) of oil per day through the water injection method of oil recovery, producing low-grade crude oil. The 900 millionth barrel of oil was pumped in April 2002, and the one billionth in 2011. The pumped oil contained 20% water in 1965, and by 1994 it was 92% water.

The islands and operation were purchased by Occidental Petroleum in 2000. In 2014, Occidental Petroleum spun off all California assets into California Resources Corporation (CRC), which still owns and operates THUMS Islands as of 2018.

Operations in the THUMS Islands are currently run by the THUMS Long Beach Company, which is part of the California Resources Corporation.

== Islands ==
Island Grissom is the closest to land, containing waterfalls and more sculptured screens than the other islands.

Island Freeman is the largest of the islands, at 12 acres (4.9 ha).

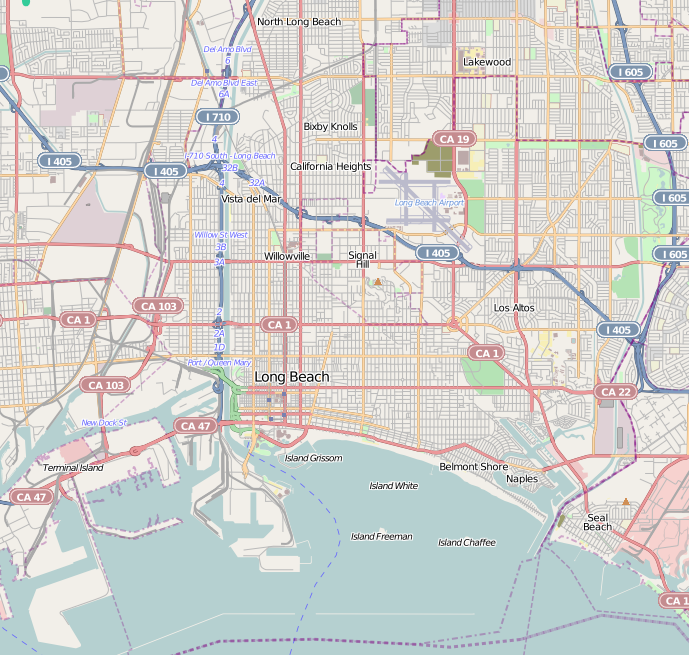
Location of THUMS Islands near Long Beach

== Appearances in popular culture ==
- California's Gold Episode 10002

== See also ==
- Rincon Island (California)
