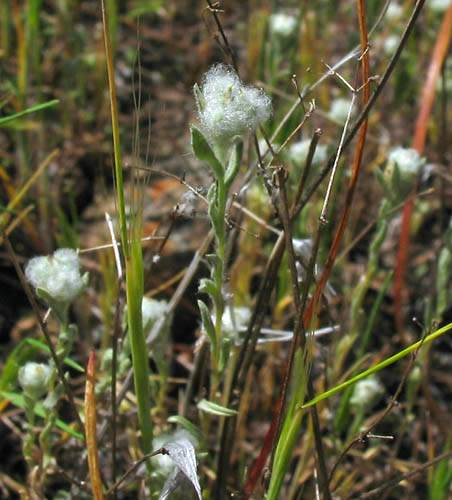
- Micropus californicus

Scientific classification
- Kingdom: Plantae
- Clade: Tracheophytes
- Clade: Angiosperms
- Clade: Eudicots
- Clade: Asterids
- Order: Asterales
- Family: Asteraceae
- Subfamily: Asteroideae
- Tribe: Gnaphalieae
- Genus: Micropus; L.

Type species
- Micropus supinus L.

Synonyms
- Gnaphalodes Mill.

= Micropus =

Cottonseed

Genus of flowering plants

Micropus, the cottonseeds, is a genus of flowering plants in the tribe Gnaphalieae within the family Asteraceae.

Species

- Micropus amphibolus A.Gray - California
- Micropus californicus Fisch. & C.A.Mey. - California, Oregon
- Micropus supinus L. - southern Europe, North Africa, Middle East, Central Asia
