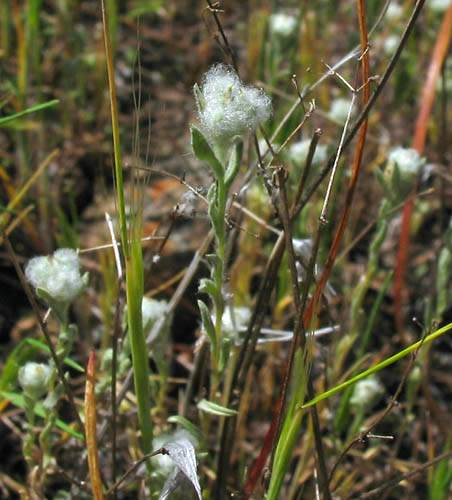

Scientific classification
- Kingdom: Plantae
- Clade: Tracheophytes
- Clade: Angiosperms
- Clade: Eudicots
- Clade: Asterids
- Order: Asterales
- Family: Asteraceae
- Genus: Micropus
- Species: M. californicus

Binomial name
- Micropus californicus Fisch. & C.A. Mey.

Synonyms
- Bombycilaena californica

= Micropus californicus =

Species of flowering plant

Micropus californicus is a plant in the family Asteraceae which is known by the common name slender cottonweed. Its flowerheads resemble very small cotton balls, often rounded with cottony white hairs forming the pappus of each seed. The individual plants are known more informally as Q-tips due to their resemblance to the cotton swabs. It is found mostly in California, and into Oregon and northern Baja California. This plant is a resident of the vernal pool plant community.
