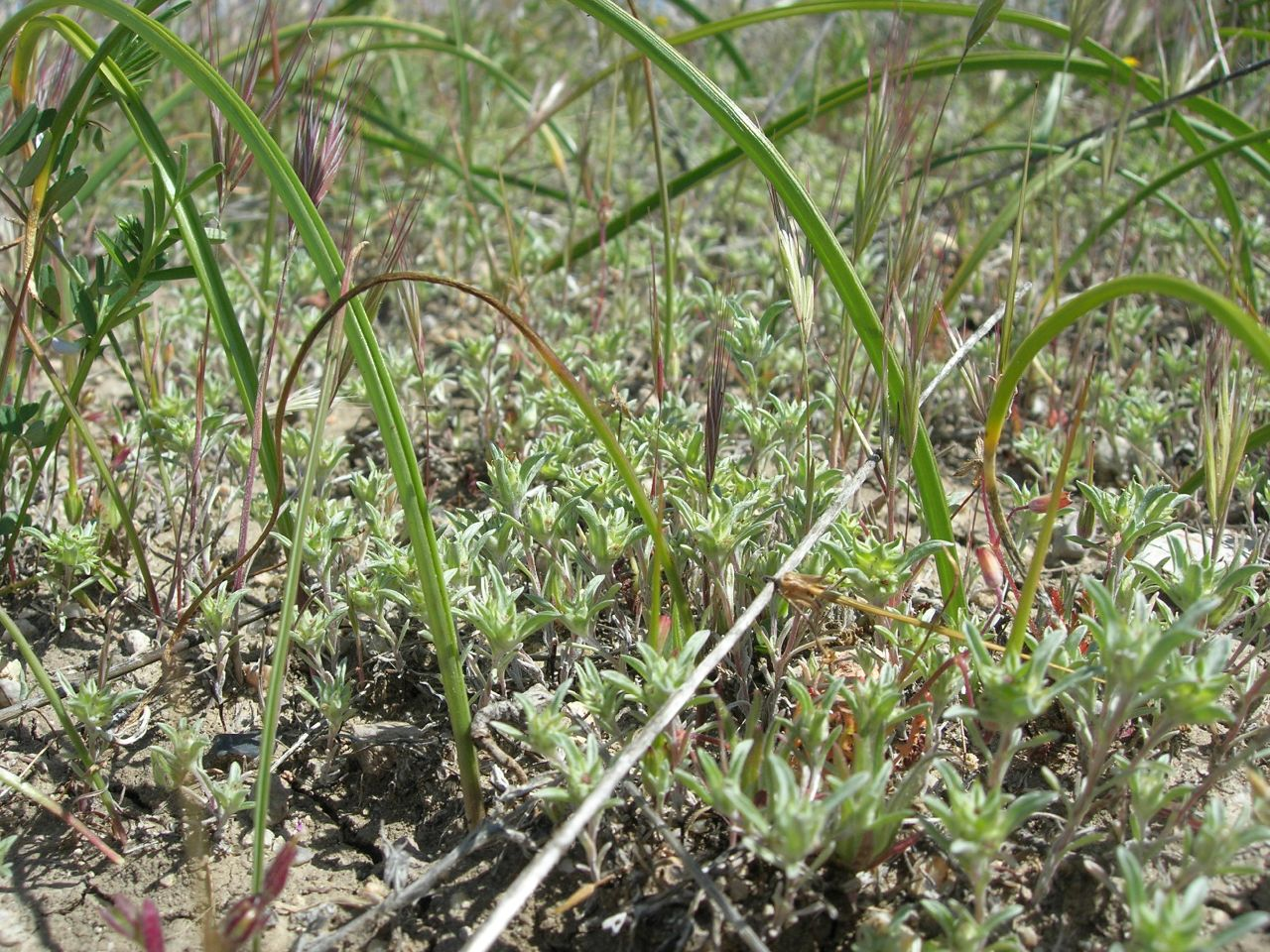
- Ancistrocarphus filagineus (small tufted plants)

Conservation status
- Secure (NatureServe)

Scientific classification
- Kingdom: Plantae
- Clade: Tracheophytes
- Clade: Angiosperms
- Clade: Eudicots
- Clade: Asterids
- Order: Asterales
- Family: Asteraceae
- Genus: Ancistrocarphus
- Species: A. filagineus

Binomial name
- Ancistrocarphus filagineus A.Gray

Synonyms
- Stylocline filaginea (A.Gray) A.Gray; Stylocline filaginea var. depressa Jeps.

= Ancistrocarphus filagineus =

Species of flowering plant

Ancistrocarphus filagineus is a North American species of flowering plants in the family Asteraceae, known by the common names woolly fishhooks and hooked groundstar. It is native to western North America, including Idaho, Oregon, Nevada, California, and Baja California.

Ancistrocarphus filagineus grows in many types of habitat, including bare, rocky habitat with clay or serpentine soils and recently burned areas. It is a petite annual herb rarely more than 15 cm (6 inches) tall. It has gray, woolly-haired herbage. The linear, lance-shaped, or oval leaves are up to 3 centimeters long and are alternately arranged on the short stems. The inflorescence is a cluster of a few small star-shaped flower heads a few millimeters wide.
