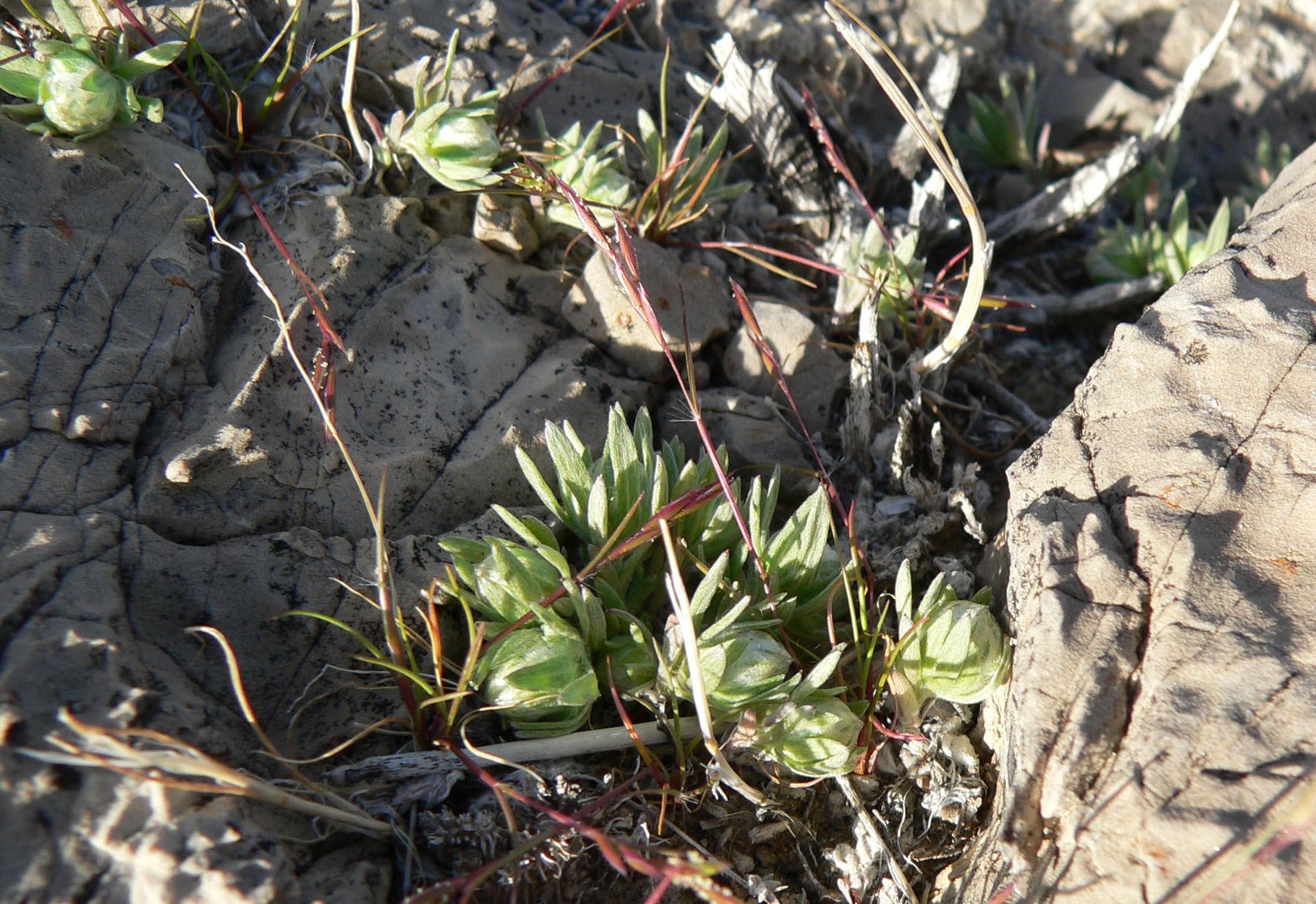

Scientific classification
- Kingdom: Plantae
- Clade: Tracheophytes
- Clade: Angiosperms
- Clade: Eudicots
- Clade: Asterids
- Order: Asterales
- Family: Asteraceae
- Genus: Stylocline
- Species: S. micropoides

Binomial name
- Stylocline micropoides A.Gray

= Stylocline micropoides =

Species of plant

Stylocline micropoides is a species of flowering plant in the family Asteraceae known by the common names woollyhead neststraw, woollyhead fanbract and desert neststraw. It is native to the southwestern United States and northern areas of Mexico, where it grows in desert habitat and other dry areas. It is a small annual herb growing at ground level with stems reaching about 20 centimeters in length. It is woolly or felt-like in texture with a coating of white hairs. The pointed leaves range to 2 centimeters in length and alternately arranged. The inflorescence bears spherical flower heads no more than a centimeter in diameter. The head generally has no phyllaries, or has small ones that fall away early. It contains several woolly white flowers.
