= Wilmington Oil Field =

Petroleum field in Los Angeles County, California, United States

Coordinates: 33.7710°N 118.2247°W

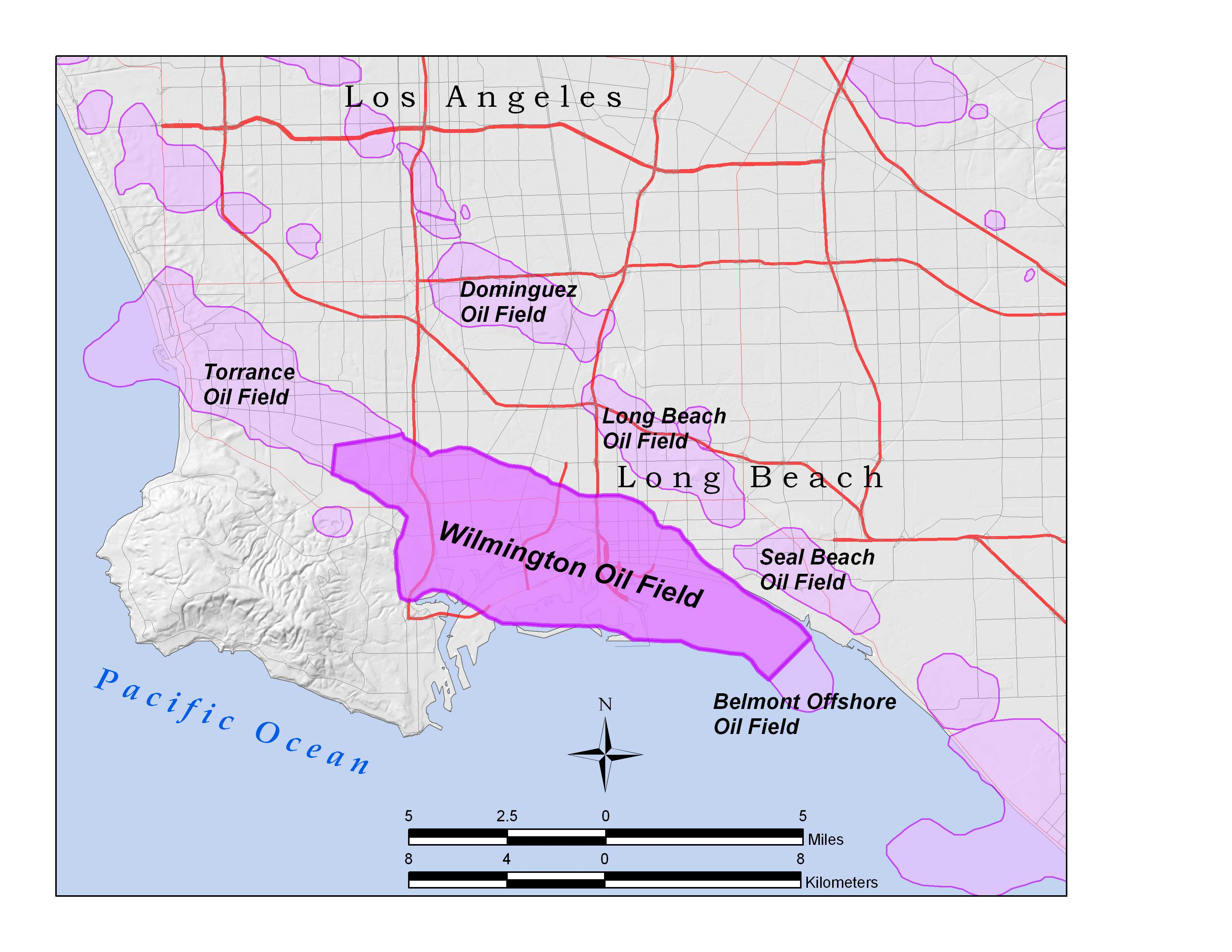
Location of the Wilmington Oil Field within the Los Angeles Basin. Oil fields are shown in light violet.

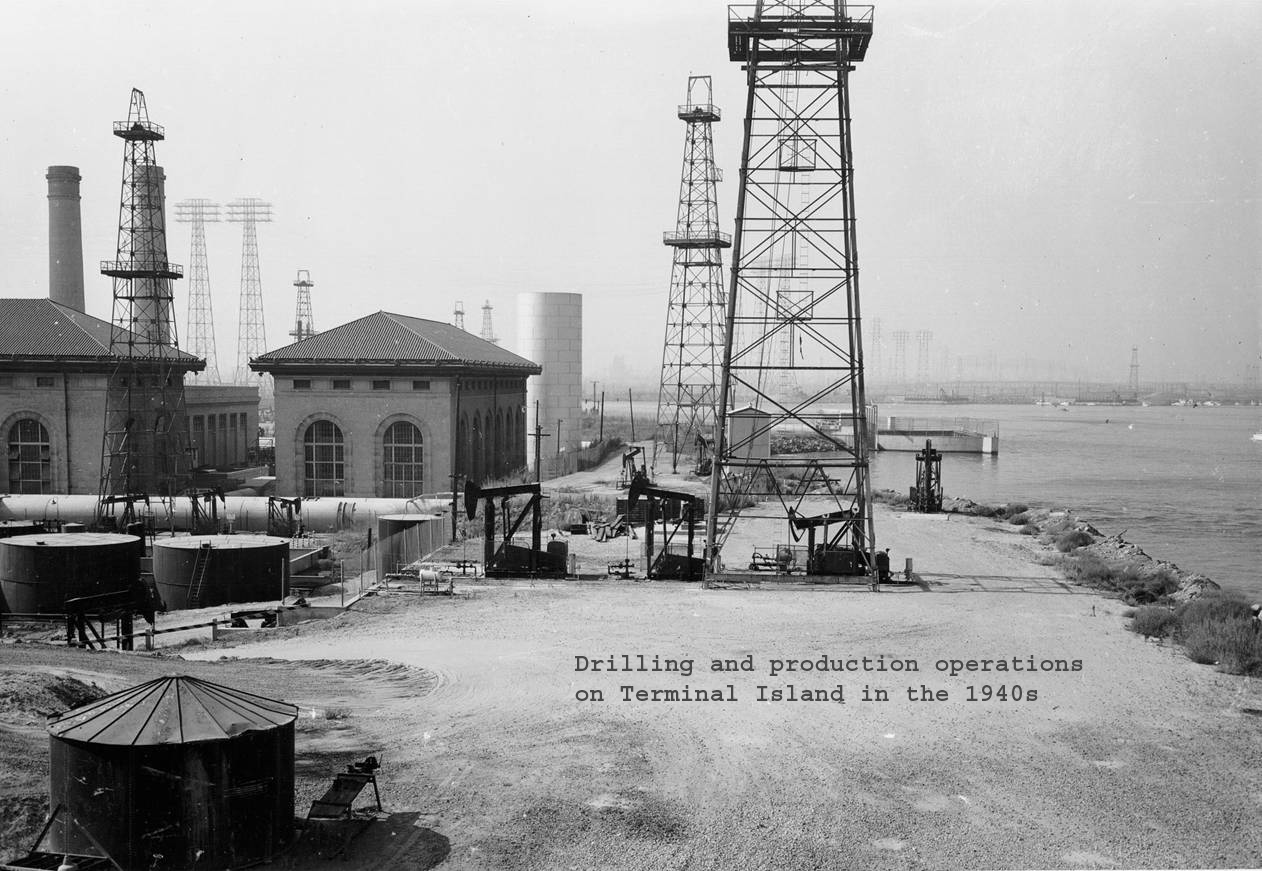
Terminal Island drilling and production operations in the 1940s.

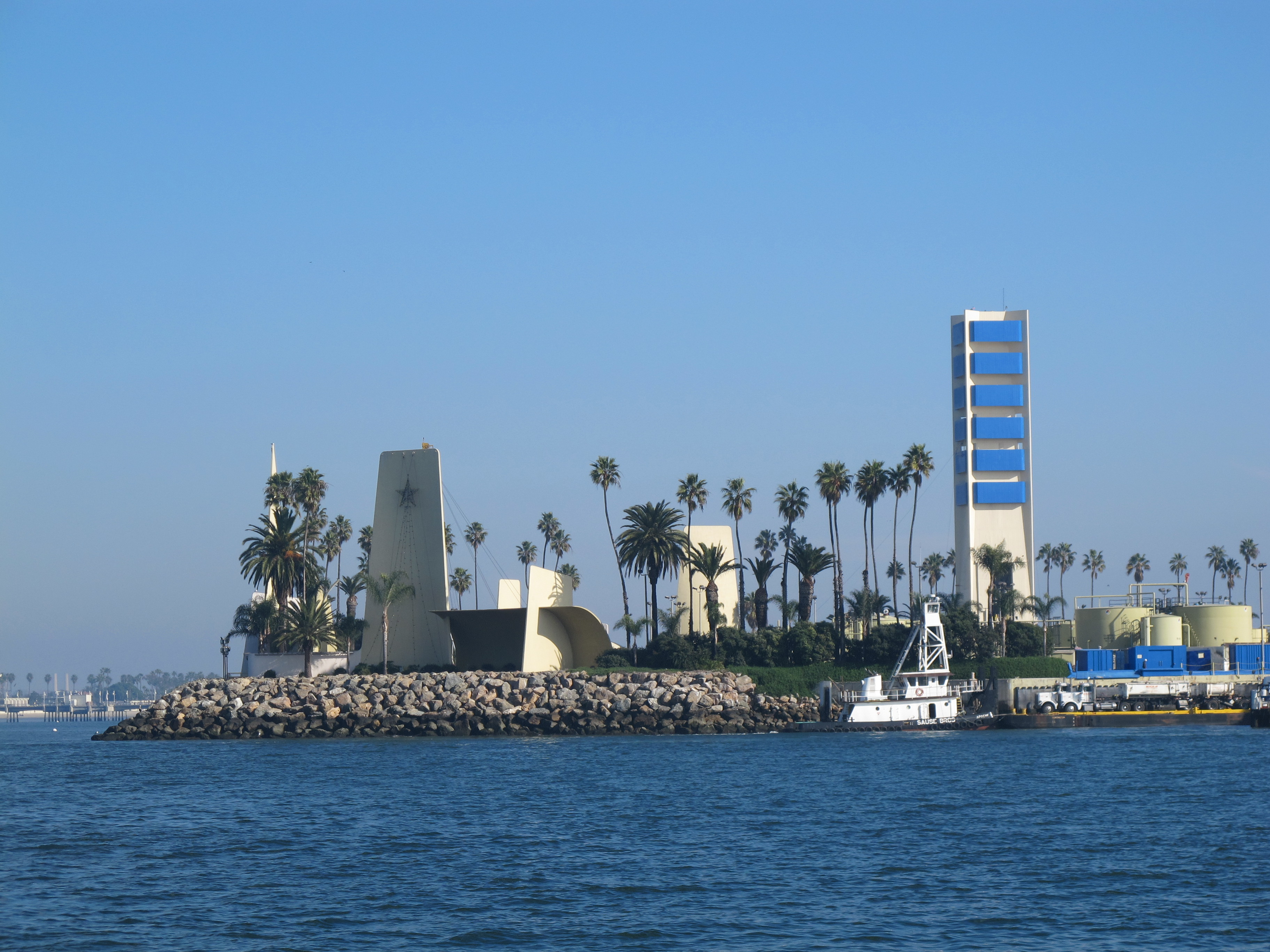
THUMS oil island White, 2010

The Wilmington Oil Field is a prolific petroleum field in Los Angeles County in southern California in the United States. Discovered in 1932, it is the third largest oil field in the United States in terms of cumulative oil production. The field runs roughly southeast to northwest through the Los Angeles Basin, stretching from the middle of San Pedro Bay through Long Beach and east of the Palos Verdes Peninsula. The field originally contained approximately 3 billion barrels (480,000,000 m^{3}) of reserves. In 2013, the USGS estimated future potential production from the combined Wilmington-Belmont oilfield could be around 900 million barrels (140,000,000 m^{3}).

The offshore portion of the oil field is developed largely through wells drilled directionally from THUMS Islands, four artificial islands in Long Beach Harbor.

== Operations ==
California Resources Corporation currently operates the Wilmington Oil Field in partnership with the State of California and the City of Long Beach. CRC's Long Beach operations include:

- THUMS Long Beach Company, which operates the offshore portion of the Wilmington Oil Field
- Tidelands Oil Production Company, which operates the onshore portion of the Wilmington Oil Field
- two additional smaller leases in the Long Beach area

== Data ==
Estimations as of 2013 (based on reserve estimates in 2008 and extraction from succeeding years, estimated through July).

- cumulative production: 2,750 million bbl (437 million m^{3})
- estimated reserves: 235 million bbl (37.4 million m^{3})
- annual production: 13 million bbl (2.1 million m^{3})
- producing wells: 1,428 (in 2008)
- estimated year of depletion (based on current rates and reserve estimates): 2031

A 2013 USGS report estimates that the Wilmington-Belmont oilfield had Original oil-in-place of between 7,600 to 12,000 million bbl (1,210 to 1,910 million m^{3}) of oil, of which an additional 200 to 1,950 million bbl (32 to 310 million m^{3}) could be produced, with 910 million bbl (145 million m^{3}) their best estimate of future production potential.

== Geology ==
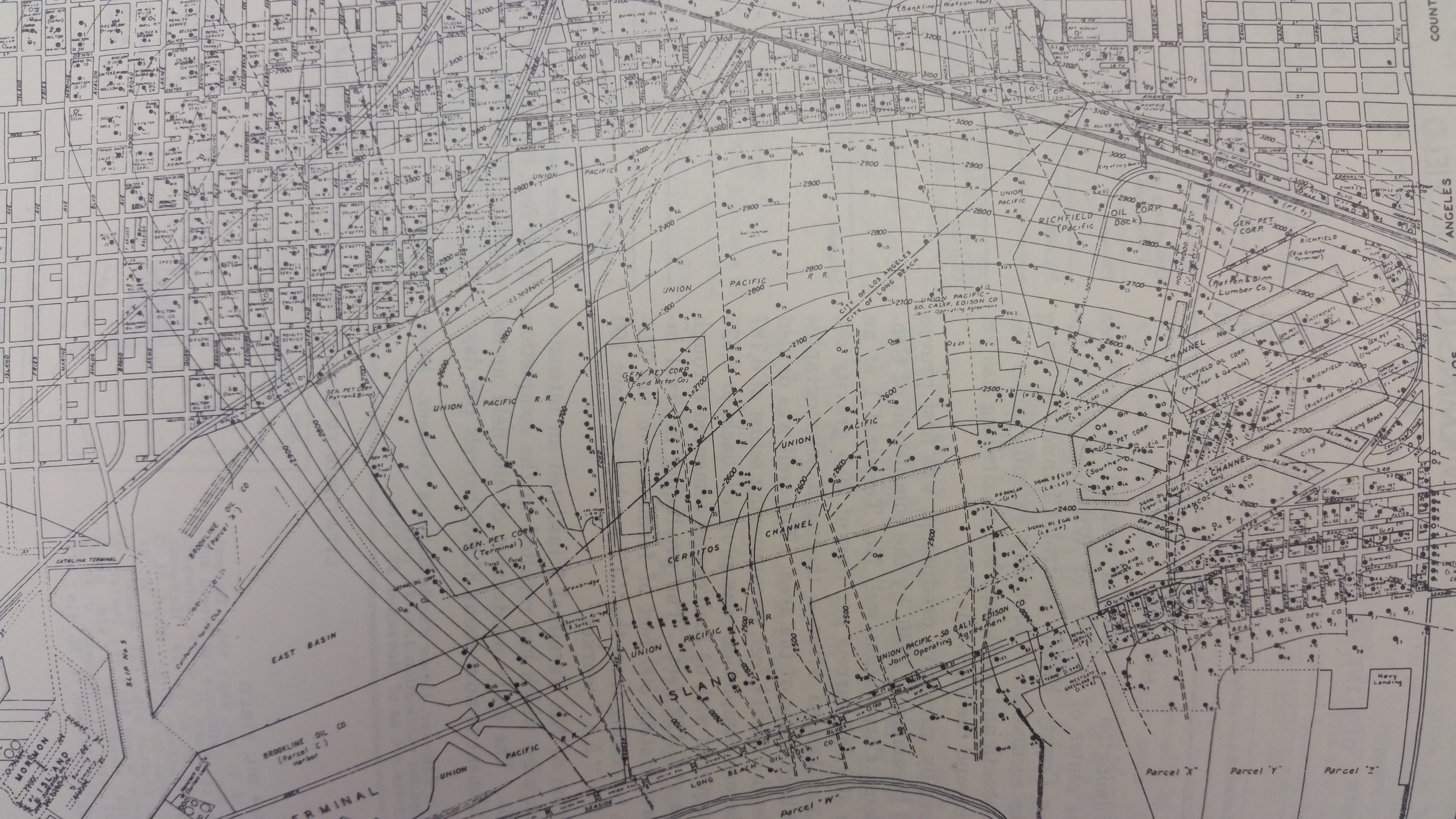
Wilmington Oil Field Structure Map

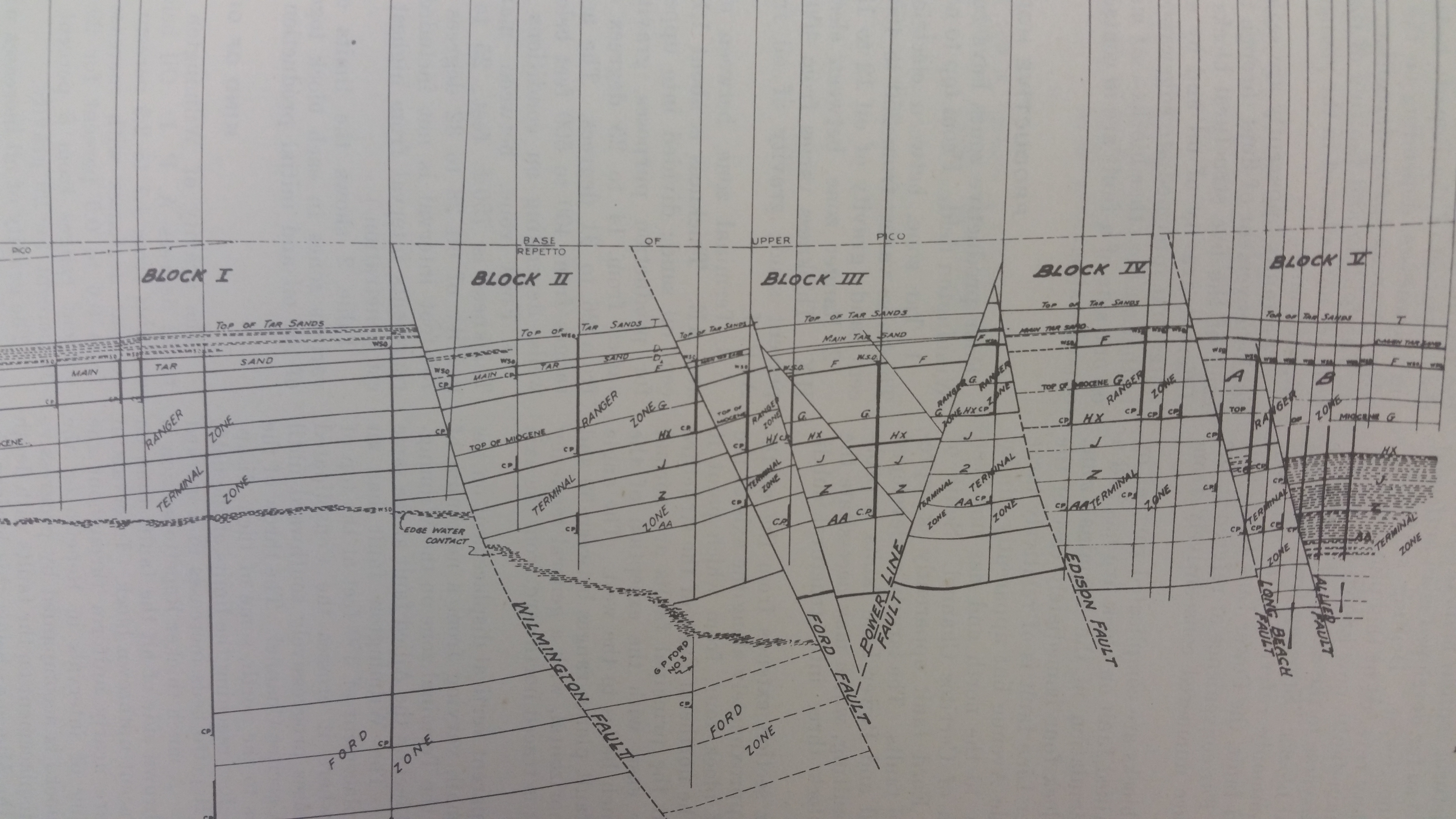
Wilmington Oil Field Geologic Cross Section

The field was discovered with the Ranger Petroleum Corp.'s Watson No. 2 well in 1932, which flowed at 150 bbl per day, and the broad anticline structure itself was discovered in 1936 by the General Petroleum Corp.'s Terminal No. 1 well based on a Reflection seismology survey. An offshore seismic survey in 1954 showed the field extended some miles to the southeast. The anticline plunges to the northwest and is separated from the Torrance Oil Field by a saddle, and is similarly separated from the Huntington Beach Oil Field to the southeast. A series of transform faults divides the field into separate blocks which form barriers to fluid movement and pressure changes. Basement consists of the Catalina Schist and is overlain with up to 8,000 feet of Miocene and Pliocene sediments, the main oil producing zones being the Puente and Repetto sandstones. An unconformity in the Pliocene between the Repetto and the Pico indicates the top of the structure was eroded to a flat surface and later Pliocene and Holocene sediments were deposited horizontally.

=== Subsidence ===
Withdrawal of large volumes of oil from the poorly consolidated sediments resulted in compaction of the oil reservoirs, and resultant sinking of the overlying land surface. Subsidence became apparent in 1940, and exceeded 20 feet at the center. Water injection to maintain pressure in the oil reservoirs began in 1953, which eventually stopped further subsidence.
