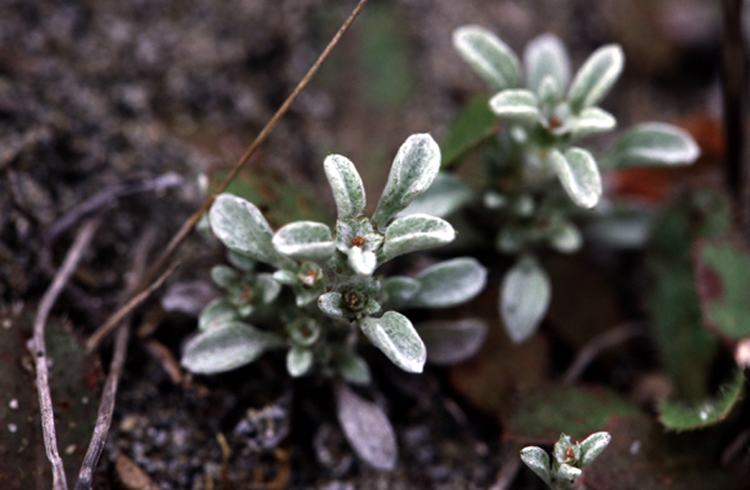
- Hesperevax sparsiflora

Scientific classification
- Kingdom: Plantae
- Clade: Tracheophytes
- Clade: Angiosperms
- Clade: Eudicots
- Clade: Asterids
- Order: Asterales
- Family: Asteraceae
- Subfamily: Asteroideae
- Tribe: Gnaphalieae
- Genus: Hesperevax; Gray

Synonyms
- Evax sect. Hesperevax Gray

= Hesperevax =

Genus of flowering plants

Hesperevax is a small genus of flowering plants in the tribe Gnaphalieae of the family Asteraceae.

Hesperevax species are generally known as dwarf cudweeds. They are native to the west coast of North America, especially California. These are petite woolly annuals with discoid flower heads.

== Species ==
Species include:

- Hesperevax acaulis - stemless dwarf-cudweed — California, Oregon
- Hesperevax caulescens - dwarf dwarf-cudweed, hogwallow starfish — endemic to California
- Hesperevax sparsiflora - erect dwarf-cudweed — California, Oregon
