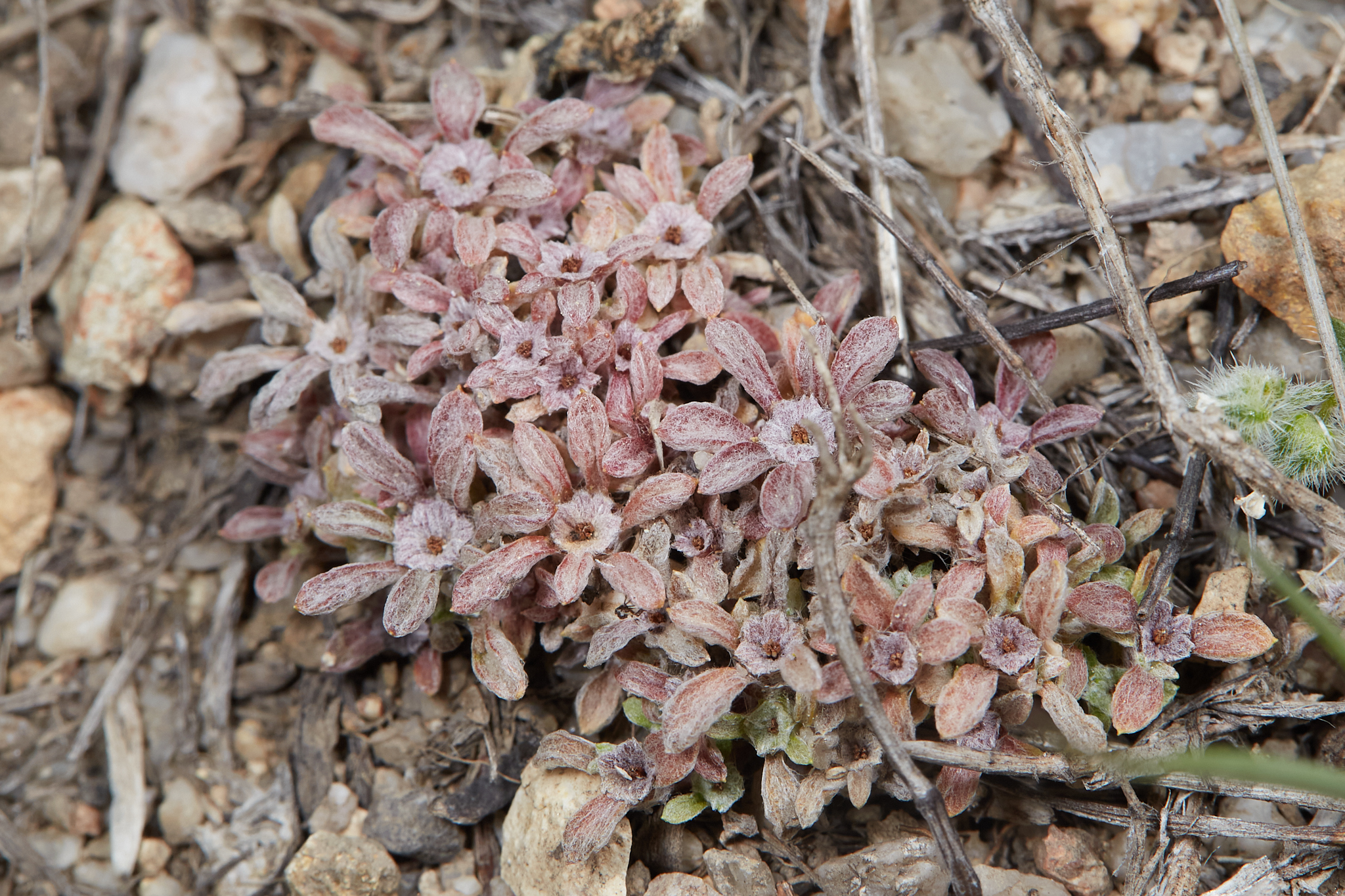

Scientific classification
- Kingdom: Plantae
- Clade: Tracheophytes
- Clade: Angiosperms
- Clade: Eudicots
- Clade: Asterids
- Order: Asterales
- Family: Asteraceae
- Genus: Hesperevax
- Species: H. acaulis

Binomial name
- Hesperevax acaulis (Kellogg) Greene

= Hesperevax acaulis =

Species of flowering plant

Hesperevax acaulis is a species of flowering plant in the family Asteraceae known by the common name stemless dwarf cudweed. It is native to California and Oregon where it grows in many types of mountain, valley, and coastal habitats, including areas recently affected by wildfire. This petite woolly annual forms a small bunch on the ground. Despite its common name it sometimes has a stem a few centimeters long. The wool-coated leaves appear in pairs or clusters, each leaf measuring a few millimeters to three centimeters long. In the center of the leaf array is the inflorescence, which is a single flower head or tightly packed cluster of several heads, each just a few millimeters wide. The flower head contains several tiny disc florets.
