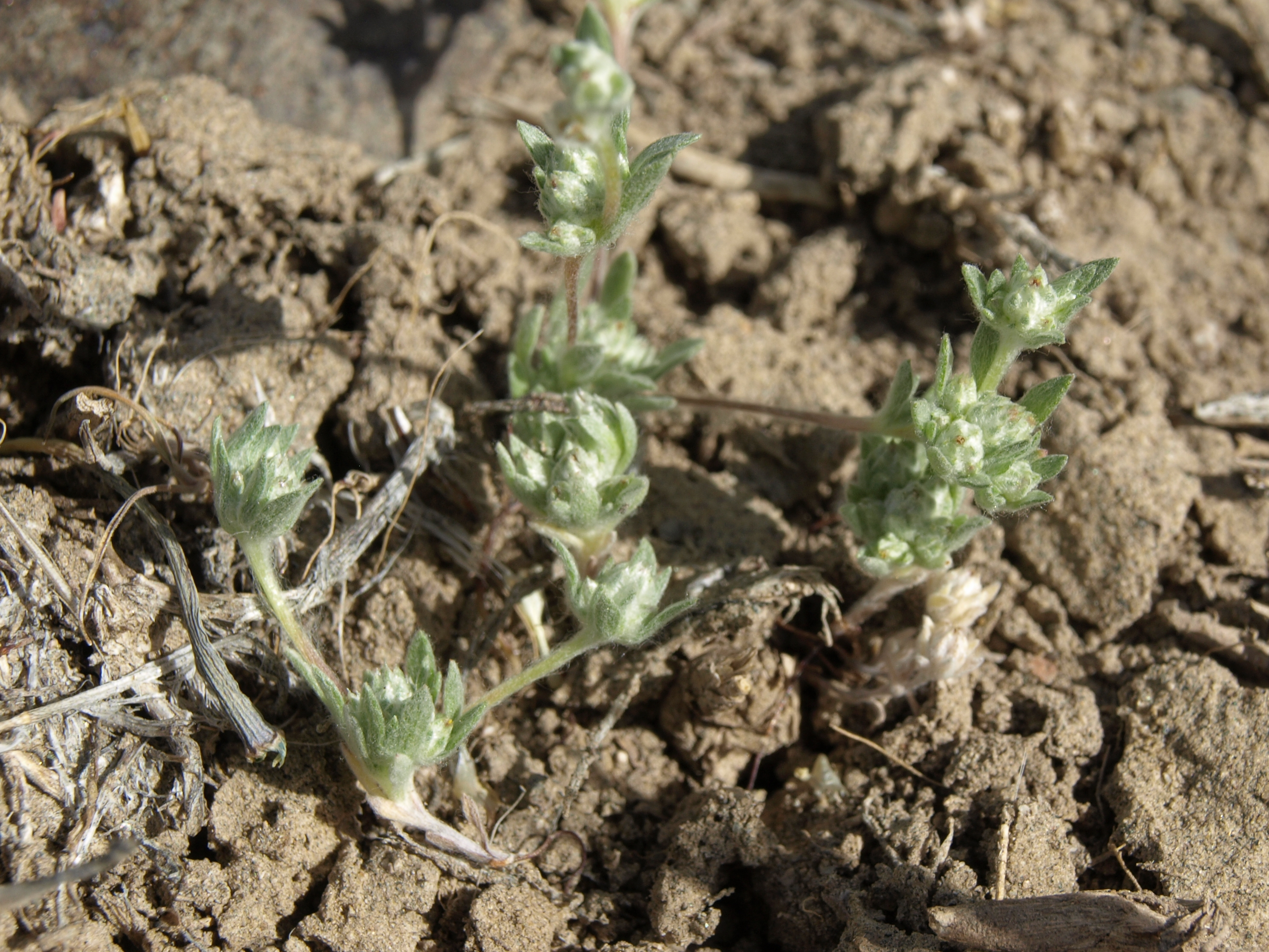
- Stylocline psilocarphoides, White Mountains, elevation 1705 m (5590 ft)

Scientific classification
- Kingdom: Plantae
- Clade: Tracheophytes
- Clade: Angiosperms
- Clade: Eudicots
- Clade: Asterids
- Order: Asterales
- Family: Asteraceae
- Genus: Stylocline
- Species: S. psilocarphoides

Binomial name
- Stylocline psilocarphoides M.Peck

= Stylocline psilocarphoides =

Species of plant

Stylocline psilocarphoides is a species of flowering plant in the family Asteraceae known by the common names baretwig neststraw and Peck's neststraw. It is native to the western United States from Idaho to southeastern California, where it grows in deserts and other dry, sandy, gravelly habitat. It is a small annual herb growing at ground level with stems measuring 1 to 18 centimeters in length. It is woolly or felt-like in texture with a coating of white hairs. The pointed leaves are up to 1.8 centimeters long and alternately arranged. The inflorescence bears oval flower heads no more than half a centimeter in diameter. The head generally has no phyllaries, or has small ones that fall away early. It is a hardened ball of several woolly white flowers.
