= California State Route 119 =

Highway in California

State Route 119
- Taft Highway
- Map of Kern County in south central California with SR 119 highlighted in red

Route information
- Maintained by Caltrans
- Length: 29.783 mi (47.931 km)
- Existed: 1934 as US 399; 1964 as SR 119–present

Major junctions
- West end: SR 33 in Taft
- I-5 near Old River
- East end: SR 99 in Bakersfield

Location
- Country: United States
- State: California
- Counties: Kern

Highway system
- State highways in California; Interstate; US; State; Scenic; History; Pre‑1964; Unconstructed; Deleted; Freeways
| ← SR 118 | → SR 120 |

State Route 119 (SR 119), named as the Taft Highway along its entire length, is a state highway in the U.S. state of California that runs in an east–west direction from State Route 33 in Taft to State Route 99 in Bakersfield. SR 119 is part of the former U.S. Route 399, which ran along SR 33 and State Route 166 before ending at SR 99 (known as US 99 before 1964). Today, it serves as the main connector between the extreme southwestern corner of the San Joaquin Valley and Bakersfield.

== Route description ==
Route 119 is defined in section 419 of the California Streets and Highways Code, and that the highway is "from Route 33 at Taft to Route 99 near Greenfield".

SR 119 starts at SR 33 near the southern end of Taft. It travels north on Taft Highway on the eastern edge of the city. Leaving the city, the road continues north through the oil producing foothills of the western San Joaquin Valley. The road then turns northeast and enters the valley. Here it passes through the towns of Valley Acres and Dustin Acres. Unlike most of the San Joaquin Valley, little farming is done in this portion of the valley. The road then turns east, and crosses I-5. The route enters agricultural land as it continues east. It then terminates at SR 99 in southern Bakersfield. Taft Highway continues as a county road to Union Avenue (old US 99 and SR 99 Business), where it becomes Panama Road.

Highway 119 is commonly known as Taft Highway. It passes through some of Kern County's most famous oil fields, including the Midway-Sunset, the third-largest oil field in the United States; the Buena Vista Oil Field; and runs adjacent to the Elk Hills Oil Field, formerly the Naval Petroleum Reserve No. 1, infamous as one of the two illicit leases – the other being Teapot Dome – that were part of the scandal which marred the administration of President Warren G. Harding in the 1920s.

SR 119 is not part of the National Highway System, a network of highways that are considered essential to the country's economy, defense, and mobility by the Federal Highway Administration.

== History ==
SR 119 was created in 1933 as Legislative Route 140. Originally, its definition was from Taft to Legislative Route Number (LRN) 4 (currently SR 99) in Greenfield (not to be confused with Greenfield in Monterey County), and from LRN 4 to LRN 58 (currently SR 58) via Arvin. The western portion was signed as part of US 399, the eastern portion was unsigned. In 1959, the eastern portion was dropped from LRN 140 and became its own state route, defined as LRN 264, and later as the signed route SR 223. After the California renumbering of state routes in 1964, LRN 140 would become SR 119. US 399 was decommissioned that year, so the route was also signed SR 119.

== Major intersections ==
Except where prefixed with a letter, postmiles were measured on the road as it was in 1964, based on the alignment that existed at the time, and do not necessarily reflect current mileage. Postmile prefixes include: R reflecting a realignment in the route since then, M indicating a second realignment, L referring to an overlap due to a correction or change, and T indicating postmiles classified as temporary. Segments that remain unconstructed or have been relinquished to local control may be omitted. The entire route is in Kern County.

| Location | Postmile | Destinations | Notes |
|---|---|---|---|
| Taft | 0.00 | SR 33 – Maricopa | West end of SR 119; former US 399 south |
| | 2.14 | Harrison Street – Ford City, Taft | Serves Taft College |
| | R13.29 | Tupman Road – Tupman, Tule Elk Reserve | |
| | 18.17 | SR 43 north (Enos Lane) – Shafter, Wasco | Roundabout; southern terminus of SR 43 |
| | 19.77 | I-5 (West Side Freeway) – Sacramento, Los Angeles | Interchange; I-5 exit 244 |
| Bakersfield | 31.28 | SR 99 | Interchange; SR 99 exit 18; east end of SR 119 |
| Bakersfield | 31.28 | Taft Highway | Continuation beyond SR 99; former US 399 north |
1.000 mi = 1.609 km; 1.000 km = 0.621 mi
