= 1921 Cal Poly Mustangs football team =

American college football season

1921 Cal Poly Mustangs football
- Conference: Independent
- Record: 3–2–1
- Head coach: Al Agosti (1st season)

The 1921 Cal Poly Mustangs football team represented California Polytechnic School—now known as California Polytechnic State University, San Luis Obispo—as an independent during the 1921 college football season. Led by first-year head coach Al Agosti, Cal Poly compiled a record of 3–2–1 outscored their opponents 107 to 48.

Cal Poly was a two-year school until 1941.

== Schedule ==
Date	Opponent	Site	Result
October 22	Santa Maria High School	San Luis Obispo, CA	W 14–7
October 28	at Taft High School	Taft, CA	L 7–27
November 5	Santa Barbara Junior College	San Luis Obispo, CA	W 42–0
November 11	Paso Robles High School	San Luis Obispo, CA	L 6–7
November 24	Atascadero High School	San Luis Obispo, CA	W 31–0
December 10	Santa Maria High School	San Luis Obispo, CA	T 7–7
