= Larry S. Pierce =

United States Army soldier

Larry Stanley Pierce
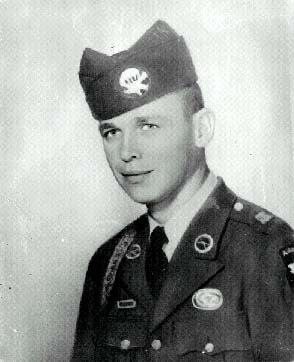
- Larry Stanley Pierce, Medal of Honor recipient
- Born: July 6, 1941; Wewoka, Oklahoma, U.S.
- Died: September 20, 1965 (aged 24); Bến Cát District, Binh Duong Province, Republic of Vietnam
- Burial place: Wasco Memorial Park, Wasco, California
- Military career
- Allegiance: United States of America
- Branch: United States Army
- Service years: 1961–1965
- Rank: Staff Sergeant (posthumous)
- Units: 503rd Infantry Regiment, 173rd Airborne Brigade
- Conflicts: Vietnam War †
- Awards: Medal of Honor; Purple Heart

Larry Stanley Pierce (July 6, 1941 – September 20, 1965) was a United States Army soldier and a recipient of the United States military's highest decoration—the Medal of Honor—for his actions in the Vietnam War.

== Biography ==
Born in Wewoka, Oklahoma, Pierce's family moved to California when he was young and he was raised there in the city of Taft and attended Taft Union High School. He and his wife Verlin had three children: a daughter, Teresa, and two sons, Kelly and Greggory.

Pierce joined the Army from Fresno, California in 1961, and by September 20, 1965, was serving as a sergeant in the Headquarters and Headquarters Company of the 1st Battalion (Airborne), 503rd Infantry Regiment, 173rd Airborne Brigade. On that day, near Bến Cát in the central highlands of South Vietnam, Pierce smothered the blast of an anti-personnel mine with his body, sacrificing his life to protect his fellow soldiers. For his actions, he was posthumously awarded the Medal of Honor on February 24, 1966, and promoted to staff sergeant. The medal was formally presented to his family by President Lyndon B. Johnson during a ceremony at the White House.

Pierce was buried at Wasco Memorial Park in Wasco, California, where his wife and children were living at the time of his death.

== Medal of Honor citation ==
Sergeant Pierce's official Medal of Honor citation reads:

For conspicuous gallantry and intrepidity at the risk of life above and beyond the call of duty. Sgt. Pierce was serving as squad leader in a reconnaissance platoon when his patrol was ambushed by hostile forces. Through his inspiring leadership and personal courage, the squad succeeded in eliminating an enemy machinegun and routing the opposing force. While pursuing the fleeing enemy, the squad came upon a dirt road and, as the main body of his men entered the road, Sgt. Pierce discovered an antipersonnel mine emplaced in the road bed. Realizing that the mine could destroy the majority of his squad, Sgt. Pierce saved the lives of his men at the sacrifice of his life by throwing himself directly onto the mine as it exploded. Through his indomitable courage, complete disregard for his safety, and profound concern for his fellow soldiers, he averted loss of life and injury to the members of his squad. Sgt. Pierce's extraordinary heroism, at the cost of his life, are in the highest traditions of the U.S. Army and reflect great credit upon himself and the Armed Forces of his country.

== Honors ==
On February 6, 2008, the post office in Taft was renamed the "Larry S. Pierce Post Office" in his honor. A portion of California State Route 46 which runs through Wasco was designated the "Staff Sgt. Larry S. Pierce Memorial Highway" in 2009.

== See also ==
- List of Medal of Honor recipients for the Vietnam War
