= Ford City, California =

Ford City
- Census-designated place
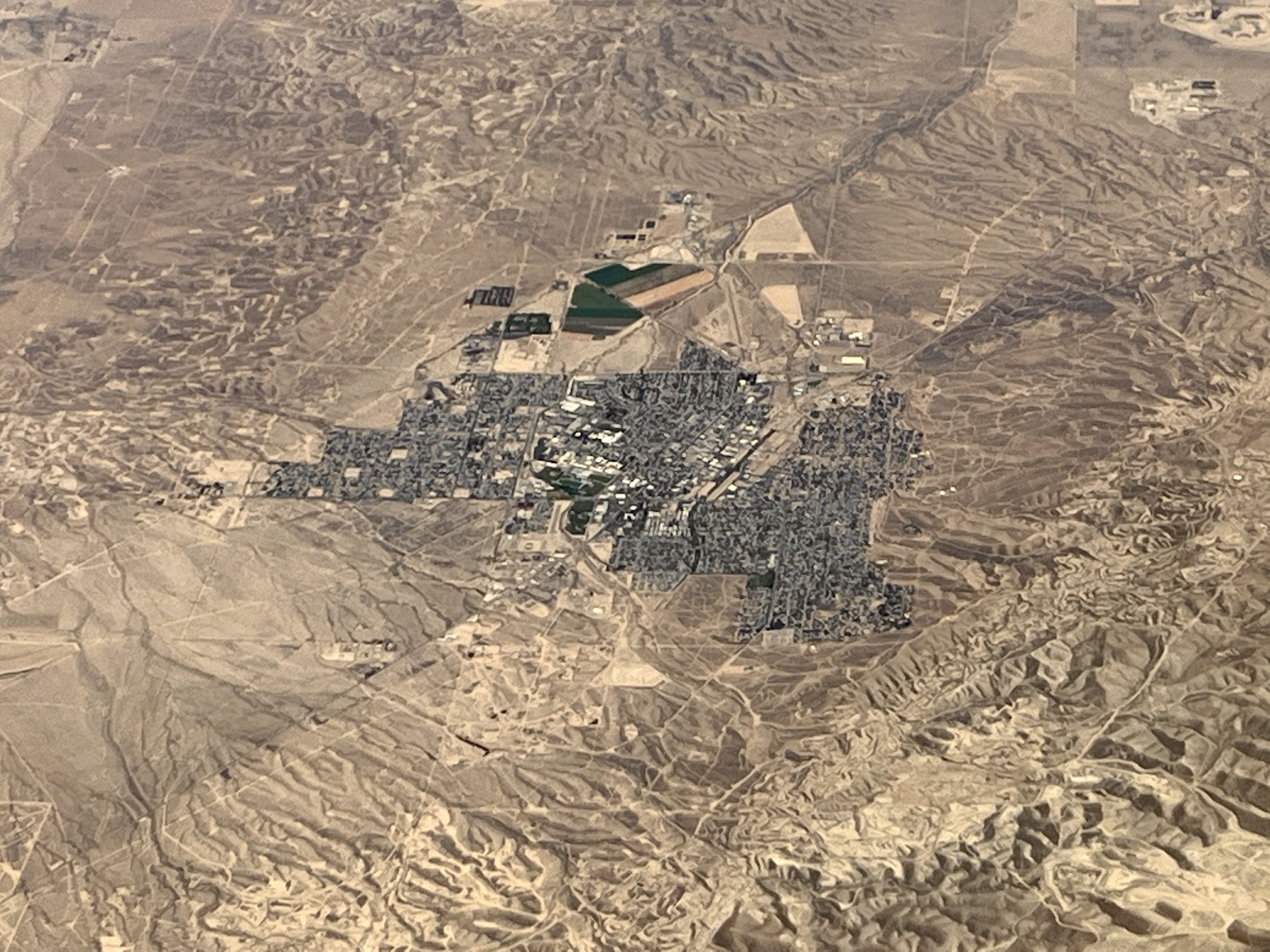

- Location in Kern County and the state of California

- Location in the United States
- Coordinates: 35°09′16″N 119°27′22″W
- Country: United States
- State: California
- County: Kern

Government
  - State senator: Shannon Grove (R)
  - Assemblymember: Stan Ellis (R)
  - U. S. rep.: Vince Fong (R)

Area
  - Total: 1.535 sq mi (3.975 km^{2})
  - Land: 1.535 sq mi (3.975 km^{2})
  - Water: 0 sq mi (0 km^{2}) 0%
- Elevation: 892 ft (272 m)

Population (2020)
  - Total: 4,348
  - Density: 2,833/sq mi (1,094/km^{2})
- Time zone: UTC-8 (PST)
  - Summer (DST): UTC-7 (PDT)
- ZIP code: 93268
- Area code: 661
- FIPS code: 06-24764
- GNIS feature ID: 1660645

Ford City is a census-designated place (CDP) in Kern County, California, United States. Ford City is located 1 mile (1.61 km) north of Taft, at an elevation of 892 feet (272 m). The population was 4,348 at the 2020 census, up from 4,278 at the 2010 census. It is immediately north of Taft, between the huge Midway-Sunset Oil Field to the southwest, and the almost exhausted Buena Vista Oil Field to the northeast. State Route 119 passes east of town from its junction with SR 33 to the south.

== Geography ==
Ford City is located at 35°09′16″N 119°27′22″W.

According to the United States Census Bureau, the CDP has a total area of 1.5 square miles (3.9 km^{2}), all land.

== History ==
Originally an oil boom town, the place was named after Ford Motor Company due to the abundance of Ford Model T cars there.

== Demographics ==
Historical population
Census	Pop.	Note	%±
1950	4,347		—
1960	3,926		−9.7%
1970	3,503		−10.8%
1980	3,392		−3.2%
1990	3,781		11.5%
2000	3,512		−7.1%
2010	4,278		21.8%
2020	4,348		1.6%
U.S. Decennial Census; 1860–1870 1880-1890; 1900 1910 1920; 1930 1940 1950; 1960 1970 1980; 1990 2000 2010; 2020

Ford City first appeared as an unincorporated place in the 1950 U.S. census; and as a census designated place in the 1980 United States census.

=== Racial and ethnic composition ===
Ford City CDP, California – Racial and ethnic composition Note: the US Census treats Hispanic/Latino as an ethnic category. This table excludes Latinos from the racial categories and assigns them to a separate category. Hispanics/Latinos may be of any race.
Race / Ethnicity (NH = Non-Hispanic)	Pop 2000	Pop 2010	Pop 2020	% 2000	% 2010	% 2020
White alone (NH)	2,546	2,140	1,441	72.49%	50.02%	33.14%
Black or African American alone (NH)	8	12	19	0.23%	0.28%	0.44%
Native American or Alaska Native alone (NH)	47	14	11	1.34%	0.33%	0.25%
Asian alone (NH)	45	31	13	1.28%	0.72%	0.30%
Native Hawaiian or Pacific Islander alone (NH)	19	31	2	0.54%	0.72%	0.05%
Other race alone (NH)	11	11	24	0.31%	0.26%	0.55%
Mixed race or Multiracial (NH)	65	68	102	1.85%	1.59%	2.35%
Hispanic or Latino (any race)	771	1,971	2,736	21.95%	46.07%	62.93%
Total	3,512	4,278	4,348	100.00%	100.00%	100.00%

=== 2020 census ===
As of the 2020 census, Ford City had a population of 4,348 and a population density of 2,832.6 inhabitants per square mile (1,093.7/km^{2}). Of residents, 92.9% lived in urban areas and 7.1% lived in rural areas.

The whole population lived in households. There were 1,260 households, out of which 47.4% included children under the age of 18, 43.7% were married-couple households, 14.7% were cohabiting couple households, 24.2% had a female householder with no spouse or partner present, and 17.5% had a male householder with no spouse or partner present. About 17.8% of households were one person, and 8.0% were one person aged 65 or older. The average household size was 3.45. There were 943 families (74.8% of all households).

The age distribution was 32.6% under the age of 18, 12.2% aged 18 to 24, 27.9% aged 25 to 44, 18.7% aged 45 to 64, and 8.7% who were 65 years of age or older. The median age was 28.3 years. For every 100 females, there were 103.5 males, and for every 100 females age 18 and over, there were 103.3 males age 18 and over.

There were 1,410 housing units at an average density of 918.6 units per square mile (354.7 units/km^{2}), of which 1,260 (89.4%) were occupied. Of occupied units, 45.2% were owner-occupied and 54.8% were occupied by renters. The homeowner vacancy rate was 3.7%; the rental vacancy rate was 7.8%.

=== Income and poverty ===
In 2023, the US Census Bureau estimated that the median household income was $45,976, and the per capita income was $19,149. About 32.9% of families and 39.2% of the population were below the poverty line.

=== 2010 census ===
At the 2010 census Ford City had a population of 4,278. The population density was 2,787.6 inhabitants per square mile (1,076.3/km^{2}). The racial makeup of Ford City was 2,735 (63.9%) White, 28 (0.7%) African American, 153 (3.6%) Native American, 36 (0.8%) Asian, 32 (0.7%) Pacific Islander, 1,113 (26.0%) from other races, and 181 (4.2%) from two or more races. Hispanic or Latino of any race were 1,971 persons (46.1%).

The whole population lived in households, no one lived in non-institutionalized group quarters and no one was institutionalized.

There were 1,260 households, 596 (47.3%) had children under the age of 18 living in them, 607 (48.2%) were opposite-sex married couples living together, 189 (15.0%) had a female householder with no husband present, 148 (11.7%) had a male householder with no wife present. There were 138 (11.0%) unmarried opposite-sex partnerships, and 4 (0.3%) same-sex married couples or partnerships. 242 households (19.2%) were one person and 94 (7.5%) had someone living alone who was 65 or older. The average household size was 3.40. There were 944 families (74.9% of households); the average family size was 3.76.

The age distribution was 1,351 people (31.6%) under the age of 18, 622 people (14.5%) aged 18 to 24, 1,182 people (27.6%) aged 25 to 44, 772 people (18.0%) aged 45 to 64, and 351 people (8.2%) who were 65 or older. The median age was 27.4 years. For every 100 females, there were 110.1 males. For every 100 females age 18 and over, there were 113.0 males.

There were 1,426 housing units at an average density of 929.2 per square mile, of the occupied units 620 (49.2%) were owner-occupied and 640 (50.8%) were rented. The homeowner vacancy rate was 2.8%; the rental vacancy rate was 5.3%. 1,843 people (43.1% of the population) lived in owner-occupied housing units and 2,435 people (56.9%) lived in rental housing units.
