= Vern Mullen =

American football player (1900–1980)

No. 15, 8, 17
- Position: Halfback

Personal information
- Born: February 27, 1900; Taylorville, Illinois, U.S.
- Died: September 14, 1980 (aged 80); Taft, California, U.S.
- Listed height: 6 ft 0 in (1.83 m)
- Listed weight: 186 lb (84 kg)

Career information
- College: Illinois; West Virginia Wesleyan

Career history
- 1923: Canton Bulldogs
- 1924–1926: Chicago Bears
- 1927: Chicago Cardinals
- 1927: Pottsville Maroons

Awards and highlights
- NFL champion (1923)

Vern Elmo Mullen (February 27, 1900 – September 14, 1980) was a professional football player from Taylorville, Illinois.

== Early life ==
Mullen was born in Taylorville, Illinois and graduated from Taylorville High School. After high school, Mullen split his college time between the University of Illinois and West Virginia Wesleyan College. While at Illinois, Mullen also competed in track and field, was a member of Sigma Pi fraternity, and participated in student opera.

== College scandal ==
In 1921, Mullen served as a ringer for his hometown Taylorville team against a team from rival Carlinville, who was also using ringers from Notre Dame. He left college to play in the game with nine other Illinois players. Taylorville's plan was to use its regular team in the first half and substitute the Illinois players in the second half. However Mullen, being a hometowner, would play the entire game. After two scoreless quarters, Mullen broke through the line to block a Carlinville punt and returned it 50 yards to the Carlinville two-foot-line. This later set up a score. Taylorville would go on to win the game 16-0 and an estimated $50,000-$100,000 in winnings. The game was well-publicized, but the college players' participation was not revealed until late January 1922. The nine Illinois players were banned from further intercollegiate competition. The eight Notre Dame players were expelled from school. This incident led to a revision of the eligibility rules and codes in the Big Ten Conference and the appointment of a full-time commissioner.

== Pro football ==
Mullen made his NFL debut in 1923 with the Canton Bulldogs, where he helped the team win the NFL Championship. He then played for the Chicago Bears from 1924 until 1926, before traveling crosstown to play for the Chicago Cardinals. He finished his career with the Pottsville Maroons in 1927.

== After Pro football ==
During the 1940s, Mullen coached football for the Taft Union High School Wildcats in Taft, California.
