= South Taft, California =

South Taft
- census-designated place
- Location in Kern County and the state of California

- Location in the United States
- Coordinates: 35°08′05″N 119°27′22″W
- Country: United States
- State: California
- County: Kern

Government
  - Senate: Shannon Grove (R)
  - Assembly: Stan Ellis (R)
  - U. S. Congress: Vince Fong (R)

Area
  - Total: 1.076 sq mi (2.787 km^{2})
  - Land: 1.076 sq mi (2.787 km^{2})
  - Water: 0 sq mi (0 km^{2})
- Elevation: 1,020 ft (310 m)

Population (2020)
  - Total: 2,100
  - Density: 2,000/sq mi (750/km^{2})
- Time zone: UTC-8 (PST)
  - Summer (DST): UTC-7 (PDT)
- ZIP code: 93268
- Area code: 661
- FIPS code: 06-73388
- GNIS feature ID: 1661482

South Taft is a census-designated place (CDP) in Kern County, California, United States. South Taft is located 0.5 miles (0.8 km) south of Taft, at an elevation of 1,017 feet (310 m). The population was 2,100 at the 2020 census, down from 2,169 at the time of the 2010 census.

== Geography ==
South Taft is located at 35°08′05″N 119°27′22″W.

According to the United States Census Bureau, the CDP has a total area of 1.1 square miles (2.8 km^{2}), all land.

== Demographics ==
Historical population
| Census | Pop. | Note | %± |
|---|---|---|---|
| 1960 | 1,910 | | — |
| 1970 | 2,214 | | 15.9% |
| 1980 | 2,073 | | −6.4% |
| 1990 | 2,170 | | 4.7% |
| 2000 | 1,898 | | −12.5% |
| 2010 | 2,169 | | 14.3% |
| 2020 | 2,100 | | −3.2% |
U.S. Decennial Census; 1860–1870 1880-1890; 1900 1910 1920; 1930 1940 1950; 1960 1970 1980; 1990 2000 2010; 2020

South Taft first appeared as an unincorporated place in the 1960 U.S. census; and as a census designated place in the 1980 United States census.

=== Racial and ethnic composition ===
South Taft CDP, California – Racial and ethnic composition Note: the US Census treats Hispanic/Latino as an ethnic category. This table excludes Latinos from the racial categories and assigns them to a separate category. Hispanics/Latinos may be of any race.
| Race / Ethnicity (NH = Non-Hispanic) | Pop 2000 | Pop 2010 | Pop 2020 | % 2000 | % 2010 | % 2020 |
|---|---|---|---|---|---|---|
| White alone (NH) | 1,326 | 1,139 | 606 | 69.86% | 52.51% | 28.86% |
| Black or African American alone (NH) | 5 | 3 | 8 | 0.26% | 0.14% | 0.38% |
| Native American or Alaska Native alone (NH) | 29 | 36 | 24 | 1.53% | 1.66% | 1.14% |
| Asian alone (NH) | 2 | 3 | 5 | 0.11% | 0.14% | 0.24% |
| Native Hawaiian or Pacific Islander alone (NH) | 14 | 10 | 2 | 0.74% | 0.46% | 0.10% |
| Other race alone (NH) | 1 | 11 | 3 | 0.05% | 0.51% | 0.14% |
| Mixed race or Multiracial (NH) | 34 | 36 | 67 | 1.79% | 1.66% | 3.19% |
| Hispanic or Latino (any race) | 487 | 931 | 1,385 | 25.66% | 42.92% | 65.95% |
| Total | 1,898 | 2,169 | 2,100 | 100.00% | 100.00% | 100.00% |

=== 2020 census ===
As of the 2020 census, South Taft had a population of 2,100. The population density was 1,951.7 inhabitants per square mile (753.6/km^{2}). The median age was 26.5 years. The age distribution was 34.4% under the age of 18, 12.9% aged 18 to 24, 25.4% aged 25 to 44, 19.4% aged 45 to 64, and 7.9% who were 65 years of age or older. For every 100 females, there were 106.7 males, and for every 100 females age 18 and over there were 101.0 males.

The whole population lived in households. 93.5% of residents lived in urban areas, while 6.5% lived in rural areas.

There were 612 households, out of which 48.9% included children under the age of 18, 36.8% were married-couple households, 14.9% were cohabiting couple households, 27.8% had a female householder with no partner present, and 20.6% had a male householder with no partner present. 18.2% of households were one person, and 8.3% were one person aged 65 or older. The average household size was 3.43. There were 451 families (73.7% of all households).

There were 685 housing units at an average density of 636.6 units per square mile (245.8 units/km^{2}), of which 612 (89.3%) were occupied. Of these, 42.6% were owner-occupied, and 57.4% were occupied by renters. 10.7% of housing units were vacant. The homeowner vacancy rate was 4.7%, and the rental vacancy rate was 7.4%.

=== 2010 census ===
At the 2010 census South Taft had a population of 2,169. The population density was 2,015.5 inhabitants per square mile (778.2/km^{2}). The racial makeup of South Taft was 1,404 (64.7%) White, 21 (1.0%) African American, 55 (2.5%) Native American, 5 (0.2%) Asian, 11 (0.5%) Pacific Islander, 596 (27.5%) from other races, and 77 (3.6%) from two or more races. Hispanic or Latino of any race were 931 people (42.9%).

The census reported that 2,028 people (93.5% of the population) lived in households, 141 (6.5%) lived in non-institutionalized group quarters, and no one was institutionalized.

There were 606 households, 293 (48.3%) had children under the age of 18 living in them, 251 (41.4%) were opposite-sex married couples living together, 117 (19.3%) had a female householder with no husband present, 72 (11.9%) had a male householder with no wife present. There were 73 (12.0%) unmarried opposite-sex partnerships, and 4 (0.7%) same-sex married couples or partnerships. 115 households (19.0%) were one person and 33 (5.4%) had someone living alone who was 65 or older. The average household size was 3.35. There were 440 families (72.6% of households); the average family size was 3.75.

The age distribution was 732 people (33.7%) under the age of 18, 275 people (12.7%) aged 18 to 24, 567 people (26.1%) aged 25 to 44, 457 people (21.1%) aged 45 to 64, and 138 people (6.4%) who were 65 or older. The median age was 27.1 years. For every 100 females, there were 116.9 males. For every 100 females age 18 and over, there were 119.1 males.

There were 733 housing units at an average density of 681.1 per square mile, of the occupied units 270 (44.6%) were owner-occupied and 336 (55.4%) were rented. The homeowner vacancy rate was 3.8%; the rental vacancy rate was 8.9%. 790 people (36.4% of the population) lived in owner-occupied housing units and 1,238 people (57.1%) lived in rental housing units.

=== Income and poverty ===
In 2023, the US Census Bureau estimated that the median household income was $41,875, and the per capita income was $15,263. About 35.6% of families and 40.1% of the population were below the poverty line.
