= Tupman, California =

Tupman
- Unincorporated Community; Census Designated Place
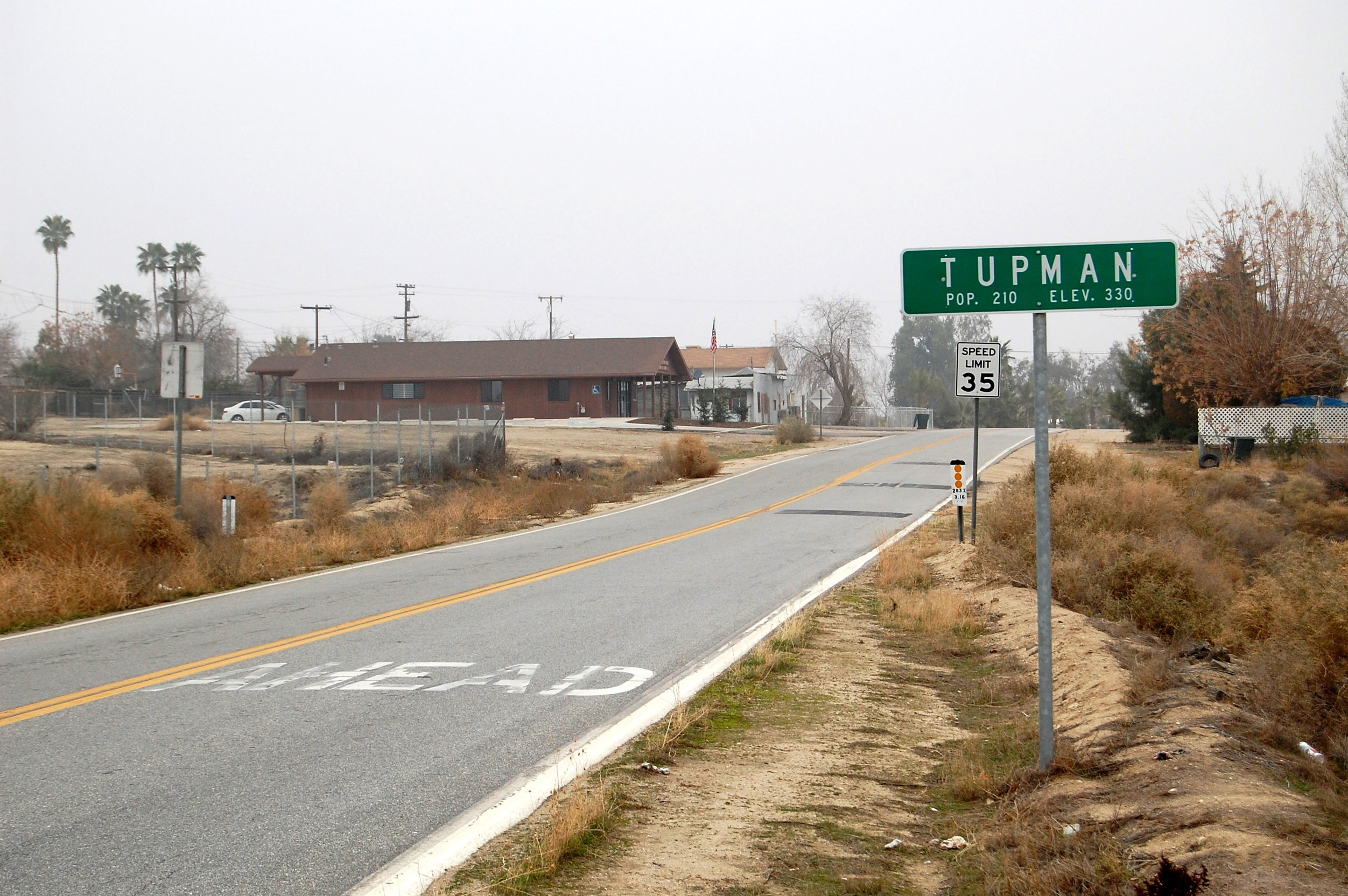
- Tupman in 2007.

- Location in Kern County and the state of California

- Location in the United States
- Coordinates: 35°17′53″N 119°21′04″W
- Country: United States
- State: California
- County: Kern

Government
  - Senate: Shannon Grove (R)
  - Assembly: Stan Ellis (R)
  - U. S. Congress: Vince Fong (R)

Area
  - Total: 0.528 sq mi (1.367 km^{2})
  - Land: 0.528 sq mi (1.367 km^{2})
  - Water: 0 sq mi (0 km^{2}) 0%
- Elevation: 331 ft (101 m)

Population (2020)
  - Total: 177
  - Density: 335/sq mi (129/km^{2})
- Time zone: UTC-8 (PST)
  - Summer (DST): UTC-7 (PDT)
- ZIP code: 93276
- Area code: 661
- FIPS code: 06-80784
- GNIS feature ID: 1661588

Tupman is a census-designated place (CDP) in Kern County, California, United States. Tupman is located 20 miles (32 km) west-southwest of Bakersfield, at an elevation of 331 feet (101 m). The population was 177 at the 2020 census, up from 161 at the 2010 census.

== Geography ==
According to the United States Census Bureau, the CDP has a total area of 0.5 square miles (1.3 km^{2}), all land. Tupman is located at the eastern end of the Elk Hills, approximately 3 miles (4.8 km) northwest of California State Route 119.

== History ==
Hamer Irwin Tupman was the original owner of the oil lease in this area. In 1920, Standard Oil Company bought the land from H. I. Tupman and founded the town. The first post office at Tupman opened in 1921. Tupman Zoological Reserve, now Tule Elk State Natural Reserve, was established near Tupman in 1932.

== Demographics ==
Historical population
Census	Pop.	Note	%±
2000	227		—
2010	161		−29.1%
2020	177		9.9%
U.S. Decennial Census; 1860–1870 1880-1890; 1900 1910 1920; 1930 1940 1950; 1960 1970 1980; 1990 2000 2010; 2020

Tupman first appeared as a census designated place in the 2000 U.S. census.

=== 2020 ===
Tupman CDP, California – Racial and ethnic composition Note: the US Census treats Hispanic/Latino as an ethnic category. This table excludes Latinos from the racial categories and assigns them to a separate category. Hispanics/Latinos may be of any race.
Race / Ethnicity (NH = Non-Hispanic)	Pop 2000	Pop 2010	Pop 2020	% 2000	% 2010	% 2020
White alone (NH)	207	139	131	91.19%	86.34%	74.01%
Black or African American alone (NH)	1	0	2	0.44%	0.00%	1.13%
Native American or Alaska Native alone (NH)	2	0	0	0.88%	0.00%	0.00%
Asian alone (NH)	0	0	0	0.00%	0.00%	0.00%
Native Hawaiian or Pacific Islander alone (NH)	0	0	0	0.00%	0.00%	0.00%
Other race alone (NH)	0	0	3	0.00%	0.00%	1.69%
Mixed race or Multiracial (NH)	3	10	17	1.32%	6.21%	9.60%
Hispanic or Latino (any race)	14	12	24	6.17%	7.45%	13.56%
Total	227	161	177	100.00%	100.00%	100.00%

The 2020 United States census reported that Tupman had a population of 177. The population density was 335.2 inhabitants per square mile (129.4/km^{2}). The racial makeup of Tupman was 133 (75.1%) White, 2 (1.1%) African American, 0 (0.0%) Native American, 0 (0.0%) Asian, 0 (0.0%) Pacific Islander, 19 (10.7%) from other races, and 23 (13.0%) from two or more races. Hispanic or Latino of any race were 24 persons (13.6%).

The whole population lived in households. There were 54 households, out of which 24 (44.4%) had children under the age of 18 living in them, 27 (50.0%) were married-couple households, 5 (9.3%) were cohabiting couple households, 13 (24.1%) had a female householder with no partner present, and 9 (16.7%) had a male householder with no partner present. 13 households (24.1%) were one person, and 5 (9.3%) were one person aged 65 or older. The average household size was 3.28. There were 40 families (74.1% of all households).

The age distribution was 54 people (30.5%) under the age of 18, 12 people (6.8%) aged 18 to 24, 43 people (24.3%) aged 25 to 44, 46 people (26.0%) aged 45 to 64, and 22 people (12.4%) who were 65 years of age or older. The median age was 33.8 years. There were 92 males and 85 females.

There were 62 housing units at an average density of 117.4 units per square mile (45.3 units/km^{2}), of which 54 (87.1%) were occupied. Of these, 24 (44.4%) were owner-occupied, and 30 (55.6%) were occupied by renters.

=== 2010 ===
At the 2010 census Tupman had a population of 161. The population density was 305.0 inhabitants per square mile (117.8/km^{2}). The racial makeup of Tupman was 149 (92.5%) White, 0 (0.0%) African American, 0 (0.0%) Native American, 0 (0.0%) Asian, 0 (0.0%) Pacific Islander, 2 (1.2%) from other races, and 10 (6.2%) from two or more races. Hispanic or Latino of any race were 12 people (7.5%).

The whole population lived in households, no one lived in non-institutionalized group quarters and no one was institutionalized.

There were 55 households, 24 (43.6%) had children under the age of 18 living in them, 26 (47.3%) were opposite-sex married couples living together, 12 (21.8%) had a female householder with no husband present, 4 (7.3%) had a male householder with no wife present. There were 3 (5.5%) unmarried opposite-sex partnerships, and 0 (0%) same-sex married couples or partnerships. 8 households (14.5%) were one person and 2 (3.6%) had someone living alone who was 65 or older. The average household size was 2.93. There were 42 families (76.4% of households); the average family size was 3.29.

The age distribution was 45 people (28.0%) under the age of 18, 19 people (11.8%) aged 18 to 24, 34 people (21.1%) aged 25 to 44, 46 people (28.6%) aged 45 to 64, and 17 people (10.6%) who were 65 or older. The median age was 32.5 years. For every 100 females, there were 106.4 males. For every 100 females age 18 and over, there were 114.8 males.

There were 73 housing units at an average density of 138.3 per square mile, of the occupied units 34 (61.8%) were owner-occupied and 21 (38.2%) were rented. The homeowner vacancy rate was 0%; the rental vacancy rate was 12.5%. 103 people (64.0% of the population) lived in owner-occupied housing units and 58 people (36.0%) lived in rental housing units.

=== 2000 ===
At the 2000 census, the median household income was $27,500 and the median family income was $43,125. Males had a median income of $38,125 versus $28,750 for females. The per capita income for the CDP was $8,482. About 12.5% of families and 20.1% of the population were below the poverty line, including 9.3% of those under the age of eighteen and 42.9% of those sixty five or over.

== Notable people ==
- Trice Harvey, former California State Assembly member.

== Gallery ==
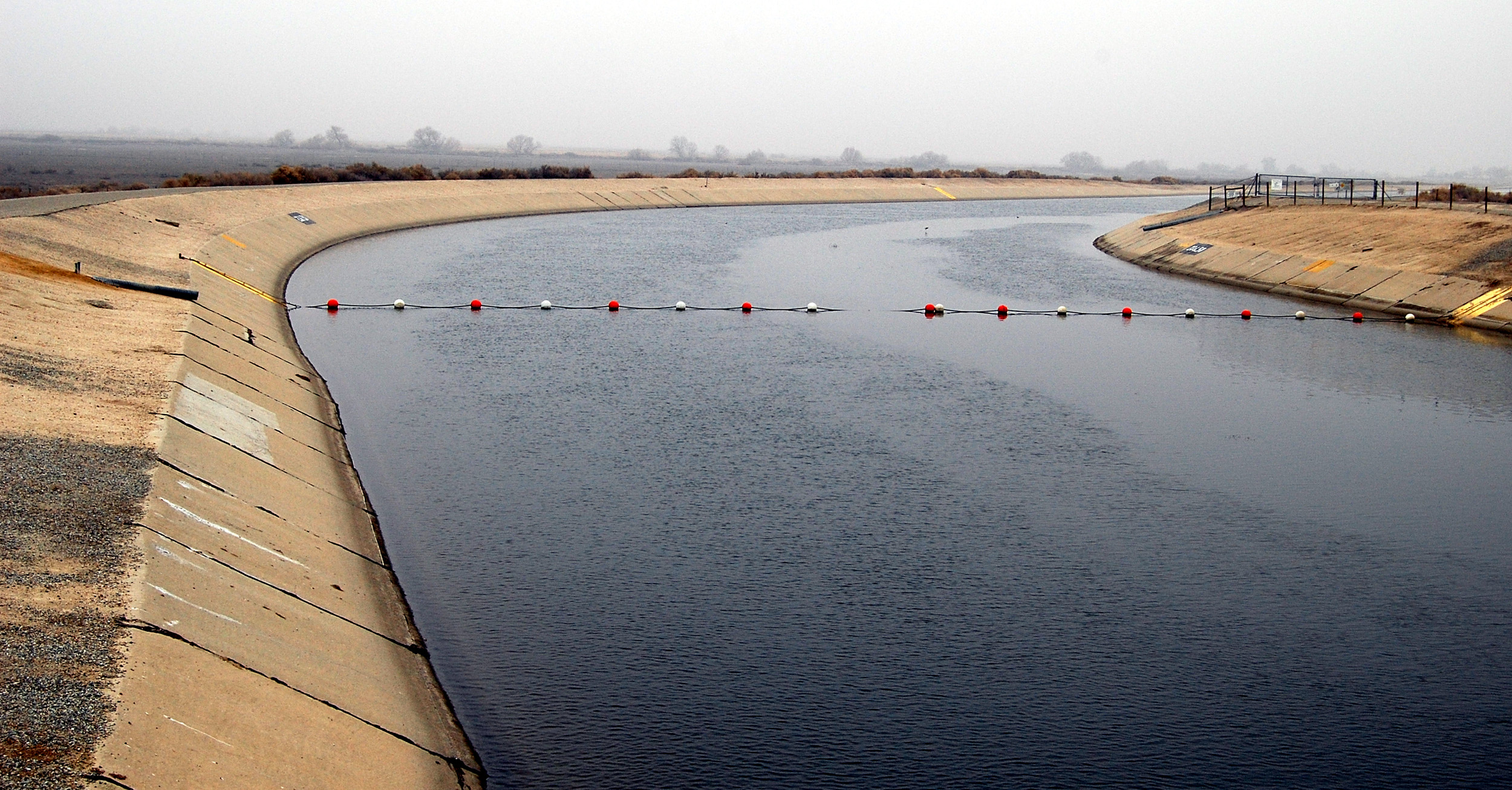
California Aqueduct near Tupman.

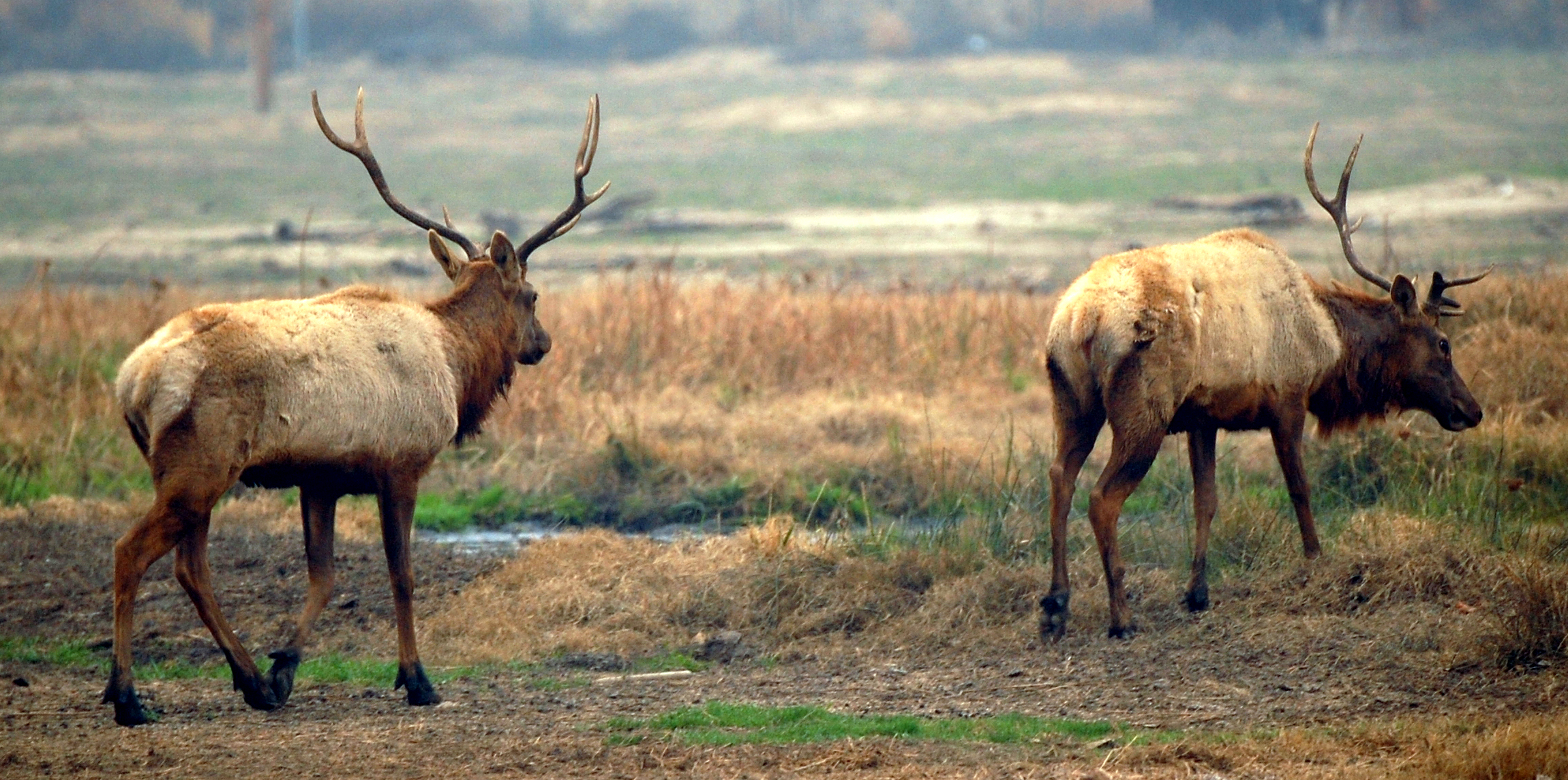
Tule Elk at the nearby reserve.
