= Taft Correctional Institution =

Former prison in Taft, Kern County, California

Coordinates: 35°06′35″N 119°23′08″W

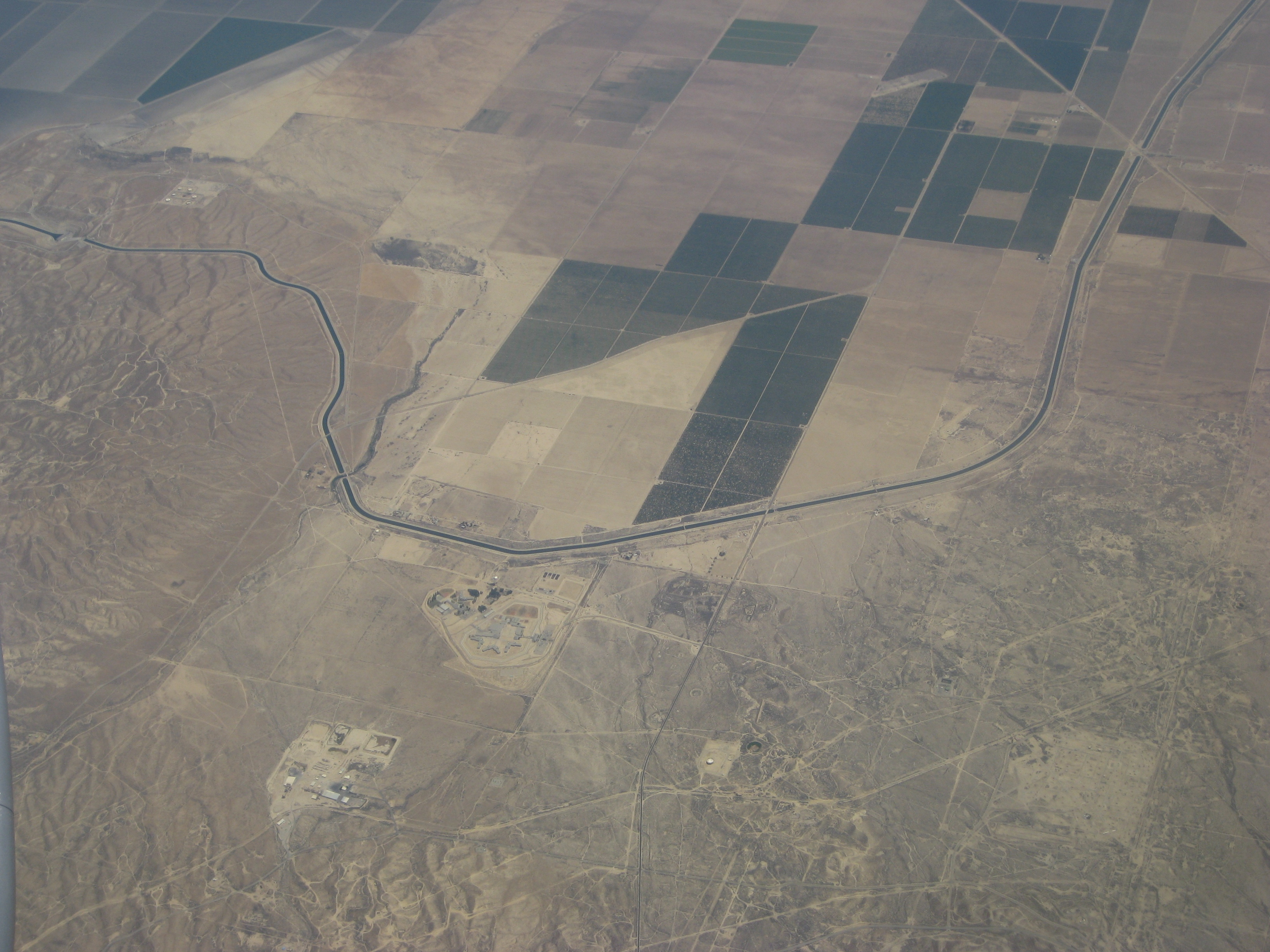
- Interactive map of Taft Correctional Institution
- Location: 1500 Cadet Road Taft, California
- Status: Closed
- Security class: Low-security (with minimum-security prison camp)
- Capacity: 2500
- Population: 2187 (360 in prison camp)
- Opened: August 20, 1997
- Closed: April 30, 2020
- Managed by: Management and Training Corporation

Taft Correctional Institution was a low-security federal prison for male inmates located in Taft, Kern County, California, owned by the Federal Bureau of Prisons (BOP) and operated by Management and Training Corporation under contract with the BOP. It also included a satellite prison camp for minimum-security male inmates.

The facility opened in 1997 as the first private prison under contract with the BOP; the contract was awarded to Wackenhut Corrections Corporation. The corporation then operated the facility under the name of The GEO Group. In August 2016, Justice Department officials announced that the BOP would be phasing out its use of contracted facilities, on the grounds that private prisons provided less safe and less effective services with no substantial cost savings. The agency expects to allow current contracts on its thirteen remaining private facilities to expire.

The facility was slated to close in 2019, but was extended several times into 2020. The congressman for the area at the time, Kevin McCarthy, opposed the closure. The correctional institute closed on April 30, 2020.

== Notable inmates ==
Inmate Name	Register Number	Photo	Status	Details
Jordan Belfort	56213-053		Released from prison in April 2006, served 22 month sentence	American stockbroker and the subject of the 2013 film The Wolf of Wall Street, based on Belfort's 2007 memoir of the same name. On July 18, 2003, he was sentenced to 22 months in federal prison for securities fraud and money laundering, and ordered to pay $110 million in restitution to clients he defrauded. While at Taft, he was the cellmate of Tommy Chong, who Bellfort credits for having helped him write his memoirs.
Don Blankenship	12393-088		Released from prison on May 10, 2017, served 1 year sentence	American business executive and perennial candidate. CEO of Massey Energy Company from 2000 until 2010, when an explosion at Massey's Upper Big Branch Mine resulted in the deaths of 29 workers. On December 3, 2015, he was convicted of conspiracy to violate mine safety and health standards. On May 12, 2016, he was sentenced to 1 year in federal prison, and forced to pay a $250,000 fine. He was released from prison on May 10, 2017.
Tommy Chong	07798-068		Released from prison on July 7, 2004, served nine month sentence	Canadian-American comedian and actor. In 2003, he was arrested as part of two American investigations, Operation Pipe Dreams and Operation Headhunter, which involved thousands of DEA agents. On October 8, 2003 was sentenced to nine months in federal prison and forced to pay a $20,000 fine and $103,514 in forfeiture for having sold drug paraphernalia through his website Nice Dreams.
Vincent Sennen Garcia	95309-198		Released from prison on April 10, 2007, served three month sentence	American surfer. In October 2006, he was convicted of tax fraud, having failed to report $471,000 in winnings between 1996 and 2001. On January 12, 2007, he was sentenced to three months in federal prison, followed by seven months of house arrest. He was released from prison on April 10, 2007.
Vic Kohring	15406-006		Released from prison on June 11, 2009, served one year sentence	American politician and former member of the Alaska House of Representatives from 1995 to 2003, and again from 2003 to his resignation in 2007. In May 2007, he was indicted in the ongoing Alaska political corruption probe for having solicited and accepted bribes from VECO Corporation. In May 2008, he was sentenced to three and a half years in federal prison on federal bribery charges. His conviction was later vacated to one year in a plea deal, and he was released from prison on June 11, 2009.
Rudy Kurniawan	62470-112		Deported to Indonesia by ICE on April 8, 2021, finished shortened sentence	Indonesian fraudster, indicted on several counts of wire fraud, mail fraud and wine fraud. Sentenced on August 7, 2014 to ten years in federal prison. He was released from prison on November 7, 2020, and handed over to the custody of Immigration and Customs Enforcement. He was formally deported to Indonesia on April 8, 2021
Richard Pinedo	35254-016		Released from custody on May 13, 2019, served six month sentence	American man from Santa Paula, California, convicted on one count of identity fraud in connection with the Mueller special counsel investigation. On October 10, 2018, he was sentenced to six months in federal prison, followed by six months of home confinement.
