= Leon Goldman (1904–1975) =

American physician

- Born: February 14, 1904; San Francisco, California, U.S.
- Died: March 4, 1975 (aged 71)
- Education: University of California, Berkeley (BS); University of California, San Francisco (MD)
- Occupation: Surgeon
- Spouse: Betty Rosenburg
- Children: 3, including Dianne Feinstein
- Family: Katherine Feinstein (granddaughter)

Leon Goldman (February 14, 1904 – March 4, 1975) was an American surgeon. Goldman was the father of Dianne Feinstein, who was the former mayor of San Francisco and a longtime member of the United States Senate from California.

== Early life and education ==
Goldman was born to a Jewish family in 1904 in San Francisco, California, one of eleven children born to immigrants from Poland. His father, Samuel Galleorivich, changed his name to Goldman and worked in the oil industry. Goldman was raised in Taft, California, where he graduated from Taft Union High School in 1922. In 1926, he graduated from the University of California, Berkeley. In 1930, he graduated with an M.D. from the University of California, San Francisco, after which he did his post-doctoral studies under Howard Christian Naffziger.

== Career ==
After the completion of his residency in 1935, he was appointed as instructor at San Francisco County Hospital where Harold Brunn was chief surgical resident. In 1939, he earned a fellowship in gastrointestinal physiology with Andrew Ivey. In 1939, he returned to work under Brunn. In 1945, he was named associate professor and chief of surgical service. In 1949, he was named full professor. He was the first Jewish professor at the University of California, San Francisco medical school. In 1953, he was named vice chairman of the Department of Surgery and chairman in 1956; also in 1956, he was named associate dean of the School of Medicine where he served until 1963.

He served as president of the Pacific Coast Surgical Association and as first vice president of the American Surgical Association and the American College of Surgeons.

== Personal life ==
Goldman was married to Betty Rosenburg, a former model. Her family was from Saint Petersburg, Russia; and while they were of German-Jewish ancestry, they practiced the Russian Orthodox faith, as was required for Jews residing in Saint Petersburg. Goldman suffered from Crohn's disease. His wife suffered from post-concussion syndrome. He was affectionately known as the "Coach" by his students.
