= Taft City School District =

School district in California, United States

Address
- 820 Sixth Street Taft, California, 93268; United States

District information
- Type: Public
- Grades: K–8
- NCES District ID: 0638700

Students and staff
- Students: 2,322
- Teachers: 108.89
- Staff: 129.71
- Student–teacher ratio: 21.32

Other information
- Website: www.taftcityschools.org

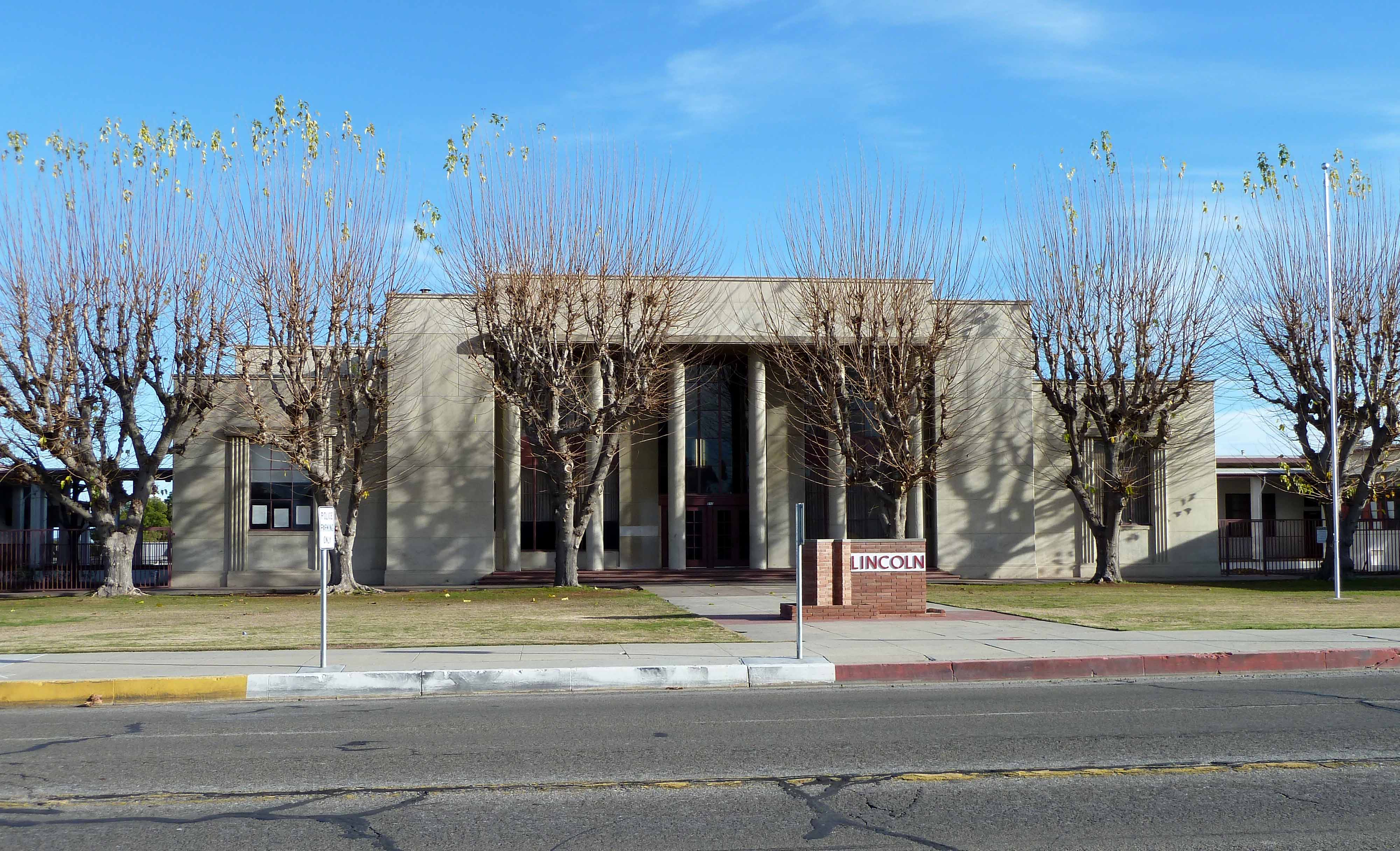
Lincoln Junior High School

Taft City School District is a public school district headquartered in Taft, California, serving pupils from Kindergarten through Grade 8. It was established in 1909, when local residents established a small city school system to meet the educational needs of children in the growing oil town. By 1932, the Conley School District was formally converted into what became known as the Taft City School District, a name it has retained since then.

Leadership of the district has changed over the decades, reflecting shifts in educational priorities and community needs. In February 2015, Julie Graves was appointed superintendent by the Board of Trustees, and she remained in office through at least 2019. More recently, records from the California Department of Education identify Lori Slaven as serving as superintendent by 2022.

== Schools ==
Junior high school
Lincoln Junior High School
Elementary schools

- Conley Elementary School
- Jefferson Elementary School
- Parkview Elementary School
- Roosevelt Elementary School
- Taft Primary Elementary School

== See also ==
- Taft Union High School - operated separately
- Taft College - Community college
