= Valley Acres, California =

Valley Acres
- Unincorporated Community; Census Designated Place
- Location in Kern County and the state of California

- Location in the United States
- Coordinates: 35°12′22″N 119°24′24″W
- Country: United States
- State: California
- County: Kern

Government
  - Senate: Shannon Grove (R)
  - Assembly: Stan Ellis (R)
  - U. S. Congress: Vince Fong (R)

Area
  - Total: 4.122 sq mi (10.677 km^{2})
  - Land: 4.122 sq mi (10.677 km^{2})
  - Water: 0 sq mi (0 km^{2}) 0%
- Elevation: 420 ft (128 m)

Population (2020)
  - Total: 504
  - Density: 122/sq mi (47.2/km^{2})
- Time zone: UTC-8 (PST)
  - Summer (DST): UTC-7 (PDT)
- ZIP code: 93268
- Area code: 661
- FIPS code: 06-81722
- GNIS feature ID: 1661615

Valley Acres is a census-designated place (CDP) in Kern County, California, United States. Valley Acres is located 5.2 miles (8.4 km) north-northeast of Taft, at an elevation of 420 feet (128.02 m). The population was 504 at the 2020 census, down from 527 at the 2010 census.

== Geography ==
Valley Acres is located at 35°12′22″N 119°24′24″W.

According to the United States Census Bureau, the CDP has a total area of 4.1 square miles (10.62 km^{2}), all land.

== History ==
The community was founded in 1937.

== Demographics ==
Historical population
Census	Pop.	Note	%±
2000	512		—
2010	527		2.9%
2020	504		−4.4%
U.S. Decennial Census; 1860–1870 1880-1890; 1900 1910 1920; 1930 1940 1950; 1960 1970 1980; 1990 2000 2010; 2020

Valley Acres first appeared as a census designated place in the 2000 U.S. census.

=== 2020 ===
Valley Acres CDP, California – Racial and ethnic composition Note: the US Census treats Hispanic/Latino as an ethnic category. This table excludes Latinos from the racial categories and assigns them to a separate category. Hispanics/Latinos may be of any race.
Race / Ethnicity (NH = Non-Hispanic)	Pop 2000	Pop 2010	Pop 2020	% 2000	% 2010	% 2020
White alone (NH)	450	379	317	87.89%	71.92%	62.90%
Black or African American alone (NH)	2	1	0	0.39%	0.19%	0.00%
Native American or Alaska Native alone (NH)	8	5	6	1.56%	0.95%	1.19%
Asian alone (NH)	1	1	2	0.20%	0.19%	0.40%
Native Hawaiian or Pacific Islander alone (NH)	3	0	0	0.59%	0.00%	0.00%
Other race alone (NH)	0	0	8	0.00%	0.00%	1.59%
Mixed race or Multiracial (NH)	10	20	15	1.95%	3.80%	2.98%
Hispanic or Latino (any race)	38	121	156	7.42%	22.96%	30.95%
Total	512	527	504	100.00%	100.00%	100.00%

The 2020 United States census reported that Valley Acres had a population of 504. The population density was 122.2 inhabitants per square mile (47.2/km^{2}). The racial makeup of Valley Acres was 336 (66.7%) White, 0 (0.0%) African American, 19 (3.8%) Native American, 2 (0.4%) Asian, 0 (0.0%) Pacific Islander, 89 (17.7%) from other races, and 58 (11.5%) from two or more races. Hispanic or Latino of any race were 156 persons (31.0%).

The whole population lived in households. There were 168 households, out of which 47 (28.0%) had children under the age of 18 living in them, 97 (57.7%) were married-couple households, 8 (4.8%) were cohabiting couple households, 25 (14.9%) had a female householder with no partner present, and 38 (22.6%) had a male householder with no partner present. 38 households (22.6%) were one person, and 13 (7.7%) were one person aged 65 or older. The average household size was 3.0. There were 123 families (73.2% of all households).

The age distribution was 139 people (27.6%) under the age of 18, 62 people (12.3%) aged 18 to 24, 112 people (22.2%) aged 25 to 44, 140 people (27.8%) aged 45 to 64, and 51 people (10.1%) who were 65 years of age or older. The median age was 32.4 years. For every 100 females, there were 126.0 males.

There were 188 housing units at an average density of 45.6 units per square mile (17.6 units/km^{2}), of which 168 (89.4%) were occupied. Of these, 136 (81.0%) were owner-occupied, and 32 (19.0%) were occupied by renters.
