= Taft Union High School =

School district in California

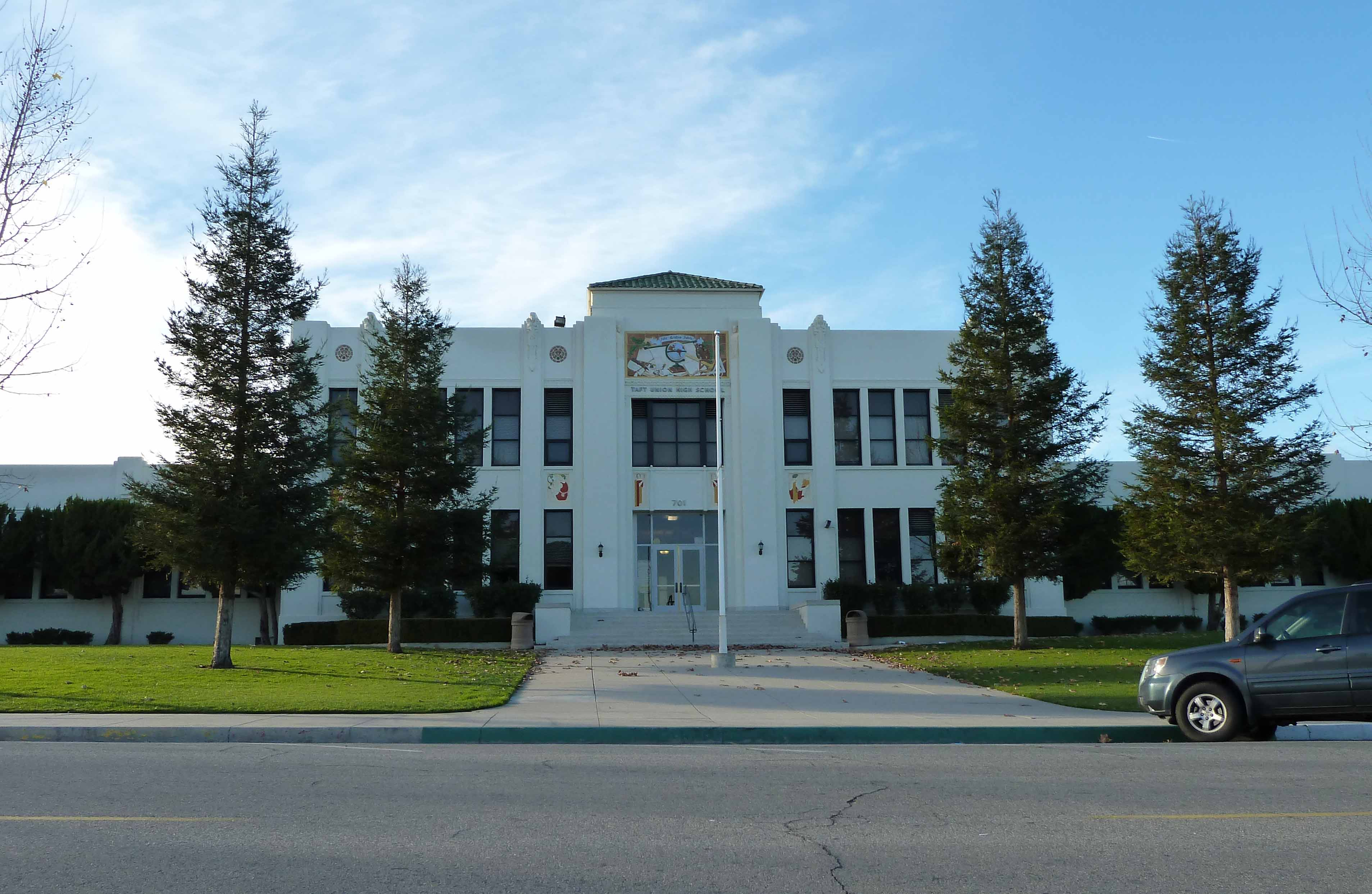

Location
- 701 Wildcat Way; Taft, Kern, California 93268; United States; 35°08′47″N 119°27′38″W

Information
- School type: Public School
- Motto: "Excellence By Design"
- Founded: 1912
- Founder: Thomas Conley and Wilson St. Clair Leirly
- School district: Taft Union High School District
- Superintendent: Blanca Cavazos
- Principal: Mary Alice Finn
- Teaching staff: 56.87 (FTE)
- Grades: 9-12
- Enrollment: 1,045 (2023-2024)
- Student to teacher ratio: 18.38
- Colours: Blue; Gold
- Athletics conference: South Sequoia League
- Nickname: Wildcats
- Newspaper: The Gusher
- Yearbook: The Derrick
- Communities served: Ford City, South Taft, Taft Heights
- Feeder schools: Elk Hills, Midway, McKittrick, Belridge, Taft City School District
- Website: tuhs.taftunion.org

Taft Union High School is located in Taft in Kern County, California, in the United States. Taft High was founded in 1912. Taft is a small city of fewer than 10,000, and the school also serves the surrounding rural area, which in the early 21st century has a total population of about 20,000. It is a part of the Taft Union High School District.

== History ==
=== Founding and early history ===
In February 1909 Thomas Conley and Wilson St. Clair Lierly circulated petitions to establish the first school district in the town. Classes started September 1909 in a small frame shack near the Moron Boiler Works at Crystal Street and Leirly Avenue near what was then Boust City. The district was formed in 1915 and named after Conley, who had donated property for the school.

By 1917 a new campus was completed on property purchased from the Southern Pacific Railroad on the northwest corner of Seventh and San Emidio streets; this is the present-day location. The Conley High School District was expanded in July 1920 by including Elk Hills, Midway, Mckittrick and Olig elementary school districts. It was then renamed the Taft Union High School District.

TUHS has been developed over the decades, with the additions of an athletic field for football and track, a gymnasium, auditorium, science building, cafeteria and domestic science buildings. The stadium was renamed as the Marion Martin Memorial Stadium in honor of a popular student and captain of the football team who was killed in 1927 in a bus accident returning from a game.

TUHS' first football team was formed under coach Andrew Hardin, although the school did not have a football field. The team was known as the Gaugers, after the oilfield workers who read the gauges on oil storage tanks. These were boom years for oil in Texas and Oklahoma. In 1928 the team was renamed the Wildcats, alluding to oil prospectors ("wildcatters"), and the wildcat was adopted as the school mascot. Practices and games were played in the baseball field.

A Taft-Bakersfield rivalry intensified over the next 30 years. Traditionally the Taft-Bakerfield game was the last game of the season and would draw crowds upwards of 7,000 for games played in Taft. It was rare for Taft to win, but in 1928 Taft defeated Bakersfield High for the first time and the Wildcats won their first Valley Championship. They won a second Valley Championship in 2007, following which the team has had few successes.

The Taft Union High School District authorized the establishment of classes at the junior college level starting in September 1922. Taft Junior College was the 16th junior college formed in the state. In 1962 Taft Junior College formed its own district: the West Kern Junior College District.

== Student activities ==
Taft High has many extracurricular activities for students. The school holds many dress-up weeks, including but not limited to dress-up days prior to the weeks of Christmas and spring break.

The school also offers numerous sports, including golf, swimming, football, basketball, baseball, softball, soccer, and others.

Taft High's drama department puts on one musical a year; roles are open by audition. Its music department (band, string orchestra, jazz band, choir, advanced choir) holds concerts that are free to the public.

=== 2013 shooting ===
On January 10, 2013, at 9:00 a.m., a gunman, later identified as 16-year-old student Bryan Oliver, armed with a 12-gauge shotgun entered a second-floor classroom where 28 students were present. He shot and seriously wounded 16-year-old Bowe Cleveland, who was treated at Kern Medical Center in Bakersfield. Oliver shot at another student, but missed. The teacher, Ryan Heber, suffered a graze wound to the head. Heber and campus supervisor Kim Lee Fields persuaded Oliver to drop his weapon and surrender and evacuated the students from the room. Police quickly arrived and arrested Oliver. Per standard response, the school was placed on lockdown and students were later picked up by their parents. Counselors were available after students returned to classes. Oliver will first be eligible for parole in January 2027. He is currently incarcerated at California Institution for Men.

Oliver had complained of being bullied. Said to have a hit list, he was charged as an adult with two counts of attempted murder and three counts of assault with a deadly weapon. Oliver took a plea deal in the criminal case and was sentenced to 27 years and 4 months in prison. After sentencing, Cleveland filed a lawsuit against the school District claiming the shooting could have been avoided.

== Representation in popular culture ==
The school was featured in the 1986 movie The Best of Times starring Robin Williams and Kurt Russell. Taft was also seen in For My Daughter's Honor (1996). Parts of the 2004 movie Frog-g-g! were filmed at TUHS as well.

== Notable people ==
=== Faculty ===
- Vern Mullen

=== Students (Note: (in chronological order)) ===
- Leon Goldman (Note: Senator Dianne Feinstein's father.)
- Russ Letlow
- Gen. Gordon M. Graham
- Jeanne Cooper
- Assemblyman Trice Harvey
- Dennis Fimple
- Kenneth Kidd
- Sgt. Larry S. Pierce
- Billy Nelson

== See also ==
- Taft College
- Taft City School District - Elementary and junior high schools
