= Dustin Acres, California =

Dustin Acres
- Unincorporated Community; Census Designated Place
- Location in Kern County and the state of California

- Location in the United States
- Coordinates: 35°13′10″N 119°23′26″W
- Country: United States
- State: California
- County: Kern

Government
  - Senate: Shannon Grove (R)
  - Assembly: Stan Ellis (R)
  - U. S. Congress: Vince Fong (R)

Area
  - Total: 3.68 sq mi (9.52 km^{2})
  - Land: 3.68 sq mi (9.52 km^{2})
  - Water: 0 sq mi (0.00 km^{2}) 0%
- Elevation: 384 ft (117 m)

Population (2020)
  - Total: 677
  - Density: 184/sq mi (71.1/km^{2})
- Time zone: UTC-8 (Pacific (PST))
  - Summer (DST): UTC-7 (PDT)
- ZIP code: 93268
- Area code: 661
- FIPS code: 06-20284
- GNIS feature ID: 1660572

Dustin Acres is a census-designated place (CDP) in Kern County, California, United States. Dustin Acres is located 6.5 miles (10 km) north-northeast of Taft, at an elevation of 384 feet (117 m). The population was 677 at the 2020 census, up from 652 at the 2010 census.

== Geography ==
Dustin Acres is located at 35°13′10″N 119°23′26″W.

According to the United States Census Bureau, the CDP has a total area of 3.676 square miles (9.521 km^{2}), all land.

== Demographics ==
Historical population
Census	Pop.	Note	%±
2000	585		—
2010	652		11.5%
2020	677		3.8%
U.S. Decennial Census; 1860–1870 1880-1890; 1900 1910 1920; 1930 1940 1950; 1960 1970 1980; 1990 2000 2010; 2020

Dustin Acres first appeared as a census designated place in the 2000 U.S. census.

=== 2020 ===
Dustin Acres CDP, California – Racial and ethnic composition Note: the US Census treats Hispanic/Latino as an ethnic category. This table excludes Latinos from the racial categories and assigns them to a separate category. Hispanics/Latinos may be of any race.
Race / Ethnicity (NH = Non-Hispanic)	Pop 2000	Pop 2010	Pop 2020	% 2000	% 2010	% 2020
White alone (NH)	498	493	448	85.13%	75.61%	66.17%
Black or African American alone (NH)	1	4	0	0.17%	0.61%	0.00%
Native American or Alaska Native alone (NH)	15	7	16	2.56%	1.07%	2.36%
Asian alone (NH)	0	1	3	0.00%	0.15%	0.44%
Native Hawaiian or Pacific Islander alone (NH)	0	0	0	0.00%	0.00%	0.00%
Other race alone (NH)	0	0	11	0.00%	0.00%	1.62%
Mixed race or Multiracial (NH)	11	18	39	1.88%	2.76%	5.76%
Hispanic or Latino (any race)	60	129	160	10.26%	19.79%	23.63%
Total	585	652	677	100.00%	100.00%	100.00%

The 2020 United States census reported that Dustin Acres had a population of 677. The population density was 184.2 inhabitants per square mile (71.1/km^{2}). The racial makeup of Dustin Acres was 469 (69.3%) White, 1 (0.1%) African American, 26 (3.8%) Native American, 4 (0.6%) Asian, 1 (0.1%) Pacific Islander, 98 (14.5%) from other races, and 78 (11.5%) from two or more races. Hispanic or Latino of any race were 160 persons (23.6%).

The whole population lived in households. There were 247 households, out of which 98 (39.7%) had children under the age of 18 living in them, 129 (52.2%) were married-couple households, 19 (7.7%) were cohabiting couple households, 51 (20.6%) had a female householder with no partner present, and 48 (19.4%) had a male householder with no partner present. 54 households (21.9%) were one person, and 22 (8.9%) were one person aged 65 or older. The average household size was 2.74. There were 182 families (73.7% of all households).

The age distribution was 139 people (20.5%) under the age of 18, 26 people (3.8%) aged 18 to 24, 176 people (26.0%) aged 25 to 44, 206 people (30.4%) aged 45 to 64, and 130 people (19.2%) who were 65 years of age or older. The median age was 44.7 years. For every 100 females, there were 98.5 males.

There were 268 housing units at an average density of 72.9 units per square mile (28.1 units/km^{2}), of which 247 (92.2%) were occupied. Of these, 198 (80.2%) were owner-occupied, and 49 (19.8%) were occupied by renters.

=== 2010 ===
At the 2010 census Dustin Acres had a population of 652. The population density was 177.4 inhabitants per square mile (68.5/km^{2}). The racial makeup of Dustin Acres was 539 (82.7%) White, 4 (0.6%) African American, 9 (1.4%) Native American, 1 (0.2%) Asian, 0 (0.0%) Pacific Islander, 71 (10.9%) from other races, and 28 (4.3%) from two or more races. Hispanic or Latino of any race were 129 people (19.8%).

The whole population lived in households, no one lived in non-institutionalized group quarters and no one was institutionalized.

There were 224 households, 83 (37.1%) had children under the age of 18 living in them, 139 (62.1%) were opposite-sex married couples living together, 22 (9.8%) had a female householder with no husband present, 10 (4.5%) had a male householder with no wife present. There were 15 (6.7%) unmarried opposite-sex partnerships, and 3 (1.3%) same-sex married couples or partnerships. 38 households (17.0%) were one person and 11 (4.9%) had someone living alone who was 65 or older. The average household size was 2.91. There were 171 families (76.3% of households); the average family size was 3.26.

The age distribution was 175 people (26.8%) under the age of 18, 56 people (8.6%) aged 18 to 24, 169 people (25.9%) aged 25 to 44, 170 people (26.1%) aged 45 to 64, and 82 people (12.6%) who were 65 or older. The median age was 37.6 years. For every 100 females, there were 107.6 males. For every 100 females age 18 and over, there were 115.8 males.

There were 252 housing units at an average density of 68.5 per square mile, of the occupied units 187 (83.5%) were owner-occupied and 37 (16.5%) were rented. The homeowner vacancy rate was 4.6%; the rental vacancy rate was 5.1%. 549 people (84.2% of the population) lived in owner-occupied housing units and 103 people (15.8%) lived in rental housing units.
