= Tule Elk State Natural Reserve =

Protected area in California, U.S.

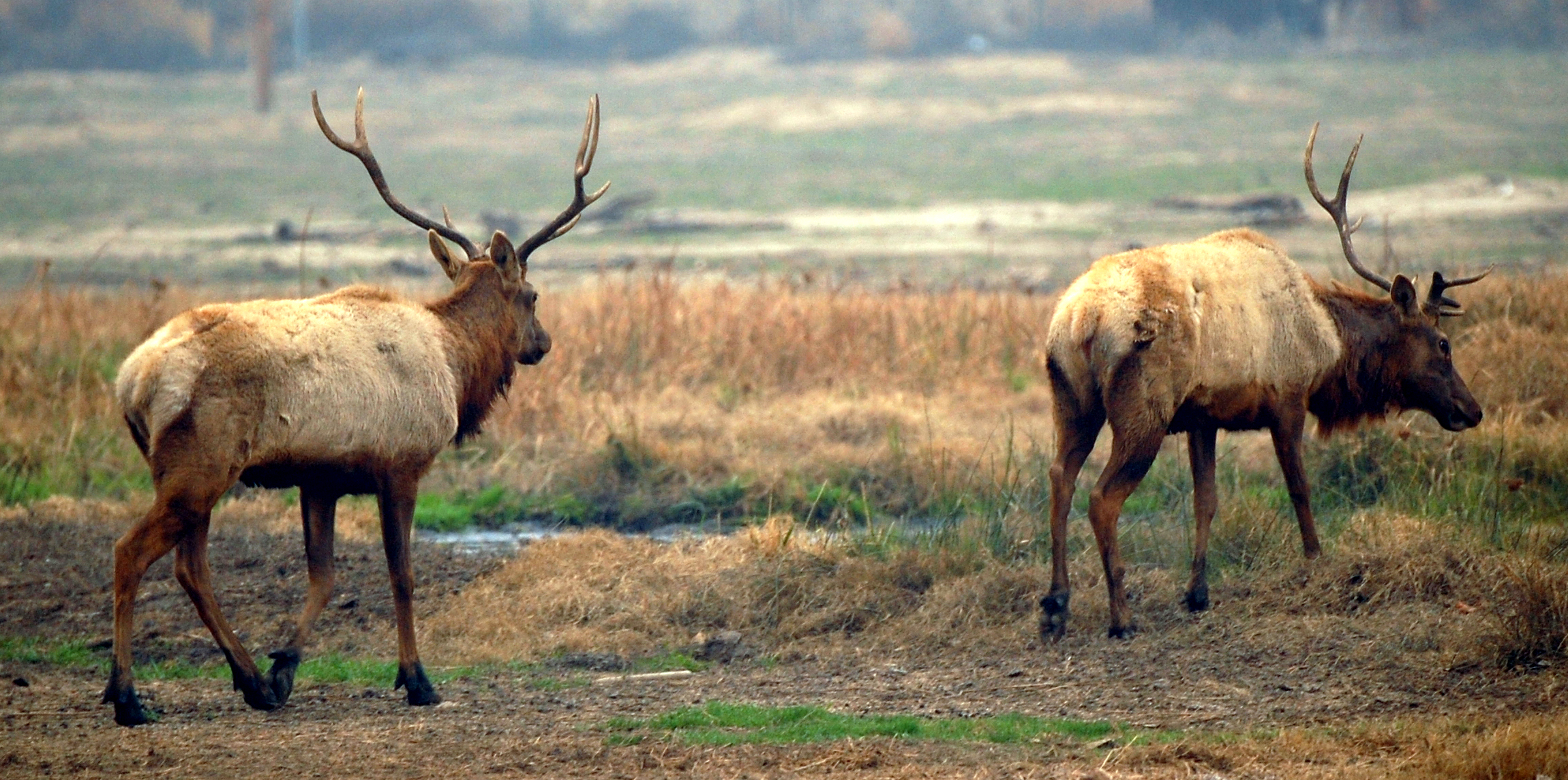
- Interactive map of Tule Elk State Natural Reserve
- Location: 8653 Station Road, Buttonwillow, CA 93206
- Nearest city: Tupman, California
- Coordinates: 35.3214°N 119.3642°W
- Created: 1932
- Operator: California State Parks
- Website: www.parks.ca.gov?page_id=584

The Tule Elk State Natural Reserve, formerly the Tupman Zoological Reserve, is a protected area operated by California State Parks for the benefit of the general public and the at-risk tule elk subspecies of indigenous Cervus canadensis. There are usually about 30 to 35 tule elk in the conservation herd on the 960-acre (390 ha) reserve in Kern County, California, United States.

== History and ecology ==
Once upon a time, tule elk were to California's Central Valley what the American bison was to the Great Plains. As a Modesto Bee staff writer explained in 1976, "In less populated times grizzly bears roamed the Central Valley and tule elk and pronghorn antelope grazed on the perennial bunch grasses." Under hunting and habitat pressure, the population of indigenous tule elk (Cervus canadensis nannodes) in California collapsed to double digits by the late 1800s. Rancher Henry Miller of the Miller and Lux Ranch, however, made a project out of sheltering the surviving individuals that lingered in the wetlands surrounding Kern County's Buena Vista Lake. By 1914, the Kern County herd protected by Miller had grown to about 400 head. The Tupman Zoological Reserve was established in 1932 with about 175 tule elk from the Miller and Lux Ranch herd. The state of California took over the site in 1953. The Tule Elk State Natural Reserve has constructed ponds, and supplemental food is provided for the animals, without which the population could not survive. The ponds are necessary since local waterways do not flow through the reserve unless water from canals is diverted to the historic Buena Vista Slough, a slow moving waterway which historically created the tule bog habitats preferred by the elk. Native plant species found at the reserve include tule, milkweed, mule fat, willow, mesquite, rabbitbrush, and a variety of wildflowers including goldfields.

Other herds in the state, such as those in the Owens Valley and near San Luis Obispo, were established using individuals from the Tule Elk State Natural Reserve. The Owens Valley herd was established in 1972 with two males and three females from the Tule Elk Reserve. Five bulls and 23 cows from the reserve founded the SLO herd in 1989. As of 2023, there were approximately 6,000 tule elk in the state.

== Access ==
Access to the park is off Stockdale Highway and Morris Road. Admission is $8 per car. Amenities include restrooms, drinking fountains, a visitor center, a viewing platform, and a picnicking area.

Most of the reserve's 960 acres are considered ecologically sensitive and are closed to the public. Ranger-led tours are typically offered the fourth Saturday of the month at 10:00 AM, except in December. Pets are prohibited on the ecologically sensitive portion of the reserve.

Circa 1993 about 30,000 people visited the park annually. The reserve abuts the Elk Hills Oil Field, formerly the Naval Petroleum Reserve. Nearby protected areas include Kern National Wildlife Refuge and Fort Tejon State Historic Park.

== See also ==
- List of California state parks
  - Antelope Valley California Poppy Reserve
- Fauna of California
  - List of mammals of California § Even-toed ungulates
- Interstate 5 in California
