= The Best of Times (1986 film) =

1986 film by Roger Spottiswoode

- Theatrical release poster
- Directed by: Roger Spottiswoode
- Written by: Ron Shelton
- Produced by: Gordon Carroll
- Starring: Robin Williams; Kurt Russell; Pamela Reed; Donald Moffat
- Cinematography: Charles F. Wheeler
- Edited by: Garth Craven
- Music by: Arthur B. Rubinstein
- Production company: Kings Road Entertainment
- Distributed by: Universal Pictures
- Release date: January 31, 1986
- Running time: 104 minutes
- Country: United States
- Language: English
- Budget: $12 million
- Box office: $7.8 million

The Best of Times is a 1986 American sports comedy-drama film directed by Roger Spottiswoode, written by Ron Shelton and starring Robin Williams and Kurt Russell as two friends attempting to relive a high school football game.

== Plot ==
Jack Dundee is a banker obsessed with what he considers the most shameful moment in his life: dropping a perfectly thrown pass in the final seconds of the 1972 high school football game between the Taft Rockets and their arch rivals, the Bakersfield Tigers, that ended in a scoreless tie. Fourteen years later, Jack still finds it impossible to forget what happened. His father-in-law, and employer, known as "the Colonel", is Bakersfield's biggest supporter and reminds Jack of the drop daily. Reno's wife Gigi leaves him again, thinking they're in a rut. She dreams of going to Los Angeles to get discovered.

Reno Hightower, Taft's former quarterback, is a struggling van specialist in debt to Jack's bank. Jack takes his car to Reno's garage where he borrows an old car to visit a massage parlor on the edge of town. Darla, his "masseuse", listens to his complaining and suggests that if the game hangs over him like a dark cloud, he should replay it. Jack proposes a rematch to the Colonel who accepts on Bakersfield's behalf. Jack's wife Elly thinks the idea is terrible and threatens to refuse him sex as incentive to abandon the rematch. He moves into a motel instead.

Jack recruits Reno, the greatest quarterback in the history of South Kern County, by helping him with his late mortgage payments. The pair solicits help from the local Caribou Lodge, and convince supporters there to restage the game. Jack disguises himself as the Bakersfield mascot tiger and defaces town property and landmarks with taunts written in Tiger orange.

The Taft Rockets start the rematch poorly, with Bakersfield leading by 26 to 0 at halftime. Jack enrages Reno by "accidentally" letting him know it was he who incited the town dressed as the Tiger's mascot. Reno's competitiveness returns, and they start to score in the second half. Reno returns Jack to the game at the last minute. In the final seconds of the game, Reno throws a deep ball to Jack for the winning touchdown.

== Cast ==
- Robin Williams as Jack Dundee
- Kurt Russell as Reno Hightower
- Pamela Reed as Gigi Hightower
- Holly Palance as Elly Dundee
- Donald Moffat as The Colonel
- Margaret Whitton as Darla
- M. Emmet Walsh as Charlie
- Donovan Scott as Eddie
- R.G. Armstrong as Schutte
- Dub Taylor as Mac
- Carl Ballantine as Arturo
- Kathleen Freeman as Rosie
- Tony Plana as Chico
- Kirk Cameron as Teddy
- Robyn Lively as Jacki
- Jeff Doucette as Olin
- Anne Haney as Marcy
- Linda Hart as Blender #1
- Tracey Gold as Jacki's friend (uncredited)
- Wayne Adderson as Bakersfield coach
- Vister Hayes as Bakersfield football player aka Doctor Death

== Production ==
Much of the film was shot in and around Taft Union High School. The football scenes took place at Pierce Junior College in the San Fernando Valley. The night game was filmed at Moorpark High School in Moorpark, California.

== Reception ==
Walter Goodman of The New York Times drew attention to the "constrained" plot and uneven script, but was complimentary of Williams's "amiable performance", and relished the rousing ending that "leaves you with the sort of sappy happy feeling that Frank Capra and Preston Sturges used to provide".

In the Los Angeles Times, Michael Wilmington gave special praise to the co-stars, Williams and Russell, who he described as "maybe the best thing" about the movie, and excused the "excesses and flaws" of the script. Calling the film "a lip-smacking tale of all-American wish-fulfillment and a witty satire of its dangers", he commended scenarist, Ron Shelton, as having "a wickedly tight grip on the absurdities and dynamics of small American cities".

The film has received mixed reviews since its release, with a 29% approval rating on Rotten Tomatoes, based on 14 reviews. On Metacritic, it has a score of 57%, based on reviews from 11 critics, indicating "mixed or average reviews". Audiences surveyed by CinemaScore gave the film a grade of "B+", on a scale of A+ to F.

Pauline Kael of The New Yorker called the film "a small town comedy where the whole population is caught up in some glorious foolishness".

Scott Weinberg of eFilmCritic.com wrote, "Forgotten by most yet seemingly adored by those who choose to remember it, The Best of Times stands in my book as one of the truly great sports comedies."

== See also ==
- List of American football films
