= Taft, California =

City in California, United States

- City
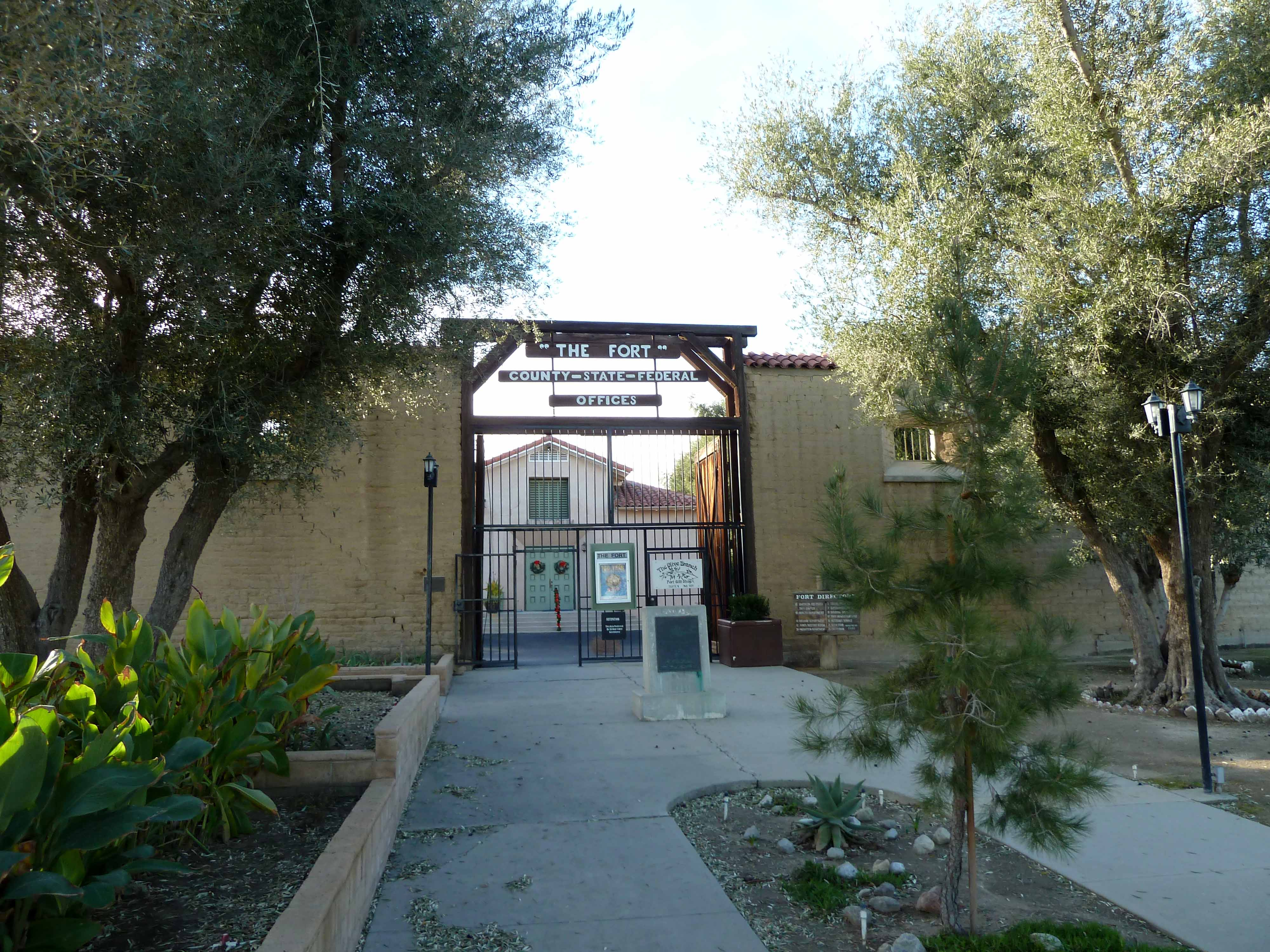
- The Fort, a replica of Sutter's Fort in Sacramento, is on the National Register of Historic Places.

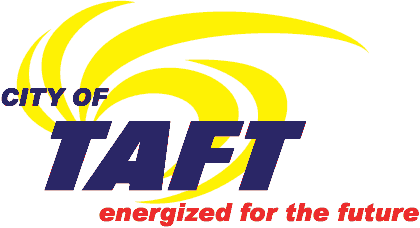
- Motto: "Energized For The Future "
- Interactive map of Taft, California
- Location within California Location within the United States Location within North America
- Coordinates: 35°08′33″N 119°27′23″W
- Country: United States
- State: California
- County: Kern
- Incorporated: November 7, 1910
- Named for: William Howard Taft

Government
  - Mayor: Dave Noerr
  - State senator: Shannon Grove (R)
  - Assemblymember: Stan Ellis (R)
  - U.S. Rep.: Vince Fong (R)

Area
  - Total: 15.27 sq mi (39.55 km^{2})
  - Land: 15.27 sq mi (39.55 km^{2})
  - Water: 0 sq mi (0.00 km^{2}) 0%
- Elevation: 955 ft (291 m)

Population (2020)
  - Total: 8,546
  - Density: 559.6/sq mi (216.1/km^{2})
- Time zone: UTC-08:00 (PST)
  - Summer (DST): UTC-07:00 (PDT)
- ZIP code: 93268
- Area code: 661
- FIPS code: 06-77574
- GNIS feature IDs: 1661543, 2412026
- Website: www.cityoftaft.org

Taft (formerly Moron, Moro, and Siding Number Two) is a city in the foothills at the extreme southwestern edge of the San Joaquin Valley, in Kern County, California, United States. Taft is located 32 miles (51 km) west-southwest of Bakersfield, at an elevation of 955 feet (291 m). The population was 8,546 at the 2020 census. According to the United States Census Bureau, the city has a total area of 15.3 square miles (39.6 km^{2}).

It was named for President William Howard Taft in 1909.

== History ==
The town began as Siding Number Two on the Sunset Railroad. According to a display at the West Kern Oil Museum, local residents asked the Southern Pacific Railroad if the station could be named Moro when the rails arrived in about 1900, but a railroad official declined because the name would be too easily confused with the coastal town of Morro Bay. Instead, the railroad directed the station be called Moron, a word which as yet had no association with lack of intelligence (cf. Spanish word for hillock, morón). Pictures of local businesses, including the Moron Pharmacy, hang in the museum.

After a fire burned much of the town, the name was changed to Taft in honor of William Howard Taft.

Taft was once a sundown town that posted "No Colored Allowed" signs.

=== Oil industry ===
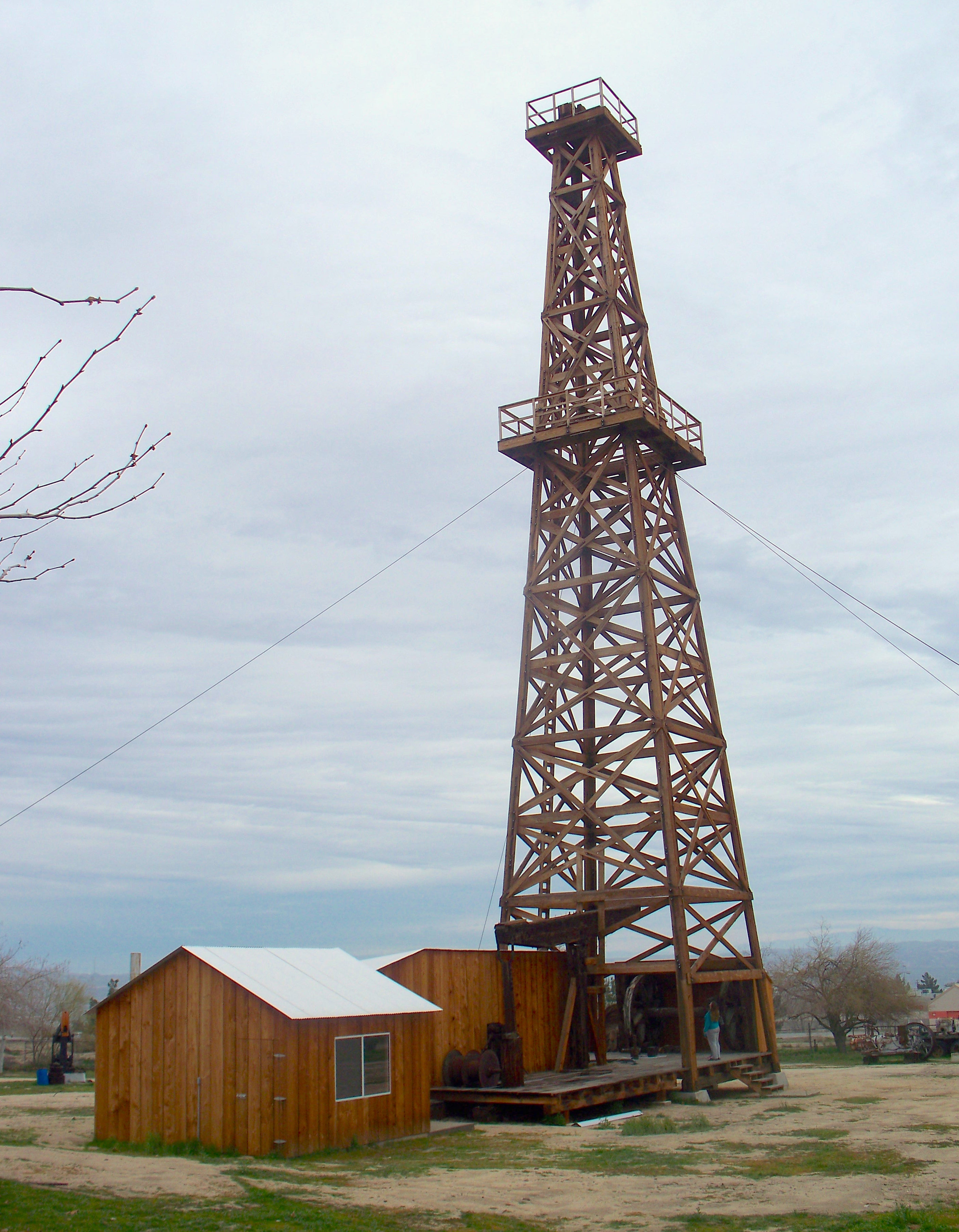
1917 wooden derrick. This oil well produced into the 1980s, and the operator then donated the old derrick and three acres of land to found the West Kern Oil Museum.

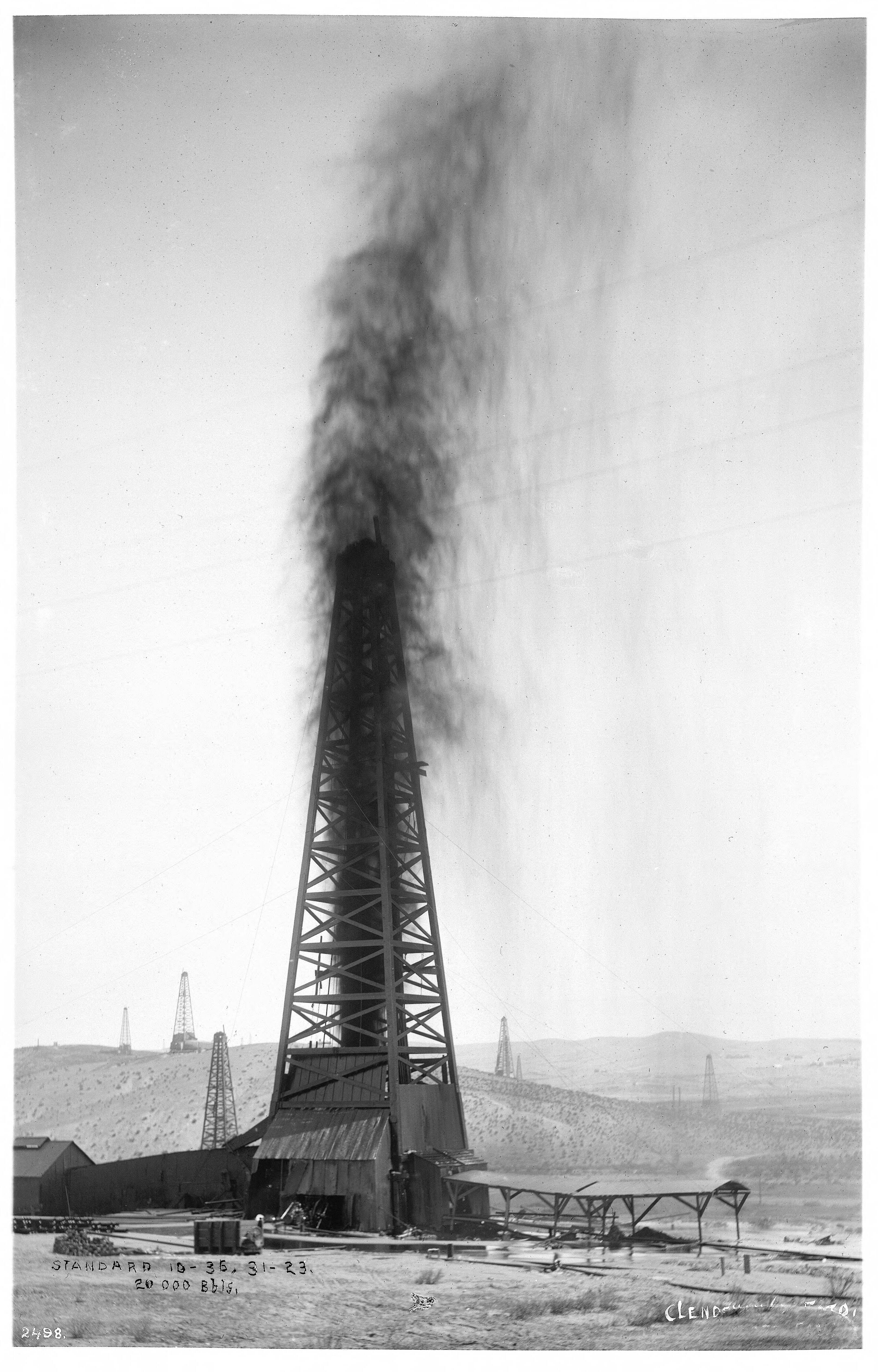
Taft oil well blow-out at a Standard Oil well, ca. 1920. Around 20,000 barrels of oil were spilled.

Taft is situated in a major petroleum and natural gas production region in California and is one of the few remaining towns in the United States which exist exclusively because of nearby oil reserves. The discovery of oil in the region occurred in the late 19th century near Maricopa, seven miles (11.27 km) south of Taft. Many other oil and gas accumulations were discovered around Taft during the early-to-mid-20th century, notably the Midway field (near Fellows, California), the Sunset field (later found to be part of the same trend, accounting for the modern combined name of Midway-Sunset), and the Buena Vista. The town is built directly between these two huge fields. The operational activities within these fields, as well as the Elk Hills Oil Field, South Belridge Oil Field, North Belridge Oil Field, Cymric Oil Field, and McKittrick Oil Field north of Taft, have been the economic lifeblood of the town for over 100 years.

The super-giant Midway-Sunset field has produced nearly 4,000,000,000 barrels (640,000,000 m^{3}) of crude oil, most of it heavy gravity (13-14 degrees API). Enhanced oil recovery operations in the form of steam production and injection have been used on the thick viscous crude oil of the Midway-Sunset field since the mid-to-late-1960s. The reservoirs of the Midway-Sunset field are composited layers of mostly unconsolidated sandstones of late Miocene age, shallowly buried. The shallow burial depth and ideal nature of the sandstones make them almost perfectly suited for steam injection. As a result, the amount of oil that can be recovered has greatly increased.

Standard Oil, later the Standard Oil Company of California (modern Chevron), made Taft its corporate operational headquarters. At one time, it is reported that as many as 6,000 inhabitants of Taft were employed by Standard Oil. The hub of this activity was "11-C Camp", so named due to its survey township location in section 11 and designated "township C" by Standard's mapping department. The infrastructure to run a large oil and gas company included: a rail spur from the line running through Taft, steel and timber for derrick construction and maintenance, pipe, valves, numerous offices, an expansive and highly specialized machine shop, supply shops, the car and truck fleet on one side of the Main Street; bunkhouses for workers, and fourteen blocks on four streets of company homes for employees on the other side. 11-C Camp also included a playground, baseball field, tennis courts, a swimming pool, a cook-house open to the public, landscaped grounds, a clubhouse with a television, pool and card tables, and an ice-cream stand. The huge complex gradually closed down over a period of many years. In 1968, Standard Oil of California moved its accounting and finance offices to Concord, California. In the late 1980s, the machine shop was closed and auctioned, signaling the end of the 11-C Camp era. The houses were moved outside the camp into a new neighborhood.

Many other oil companies had operations in the area, including larger companies such as Shell, Texaco, Exxon, Mobil, Gulf, and ARCO, as well as smaller operations (but with a large local presence), such as Santa Fe Energy, Berry Petroleum, Tannehill, M.H. Whittier, and lately Plains Exploration & Production. In the mid-1990s, according to California's Division of Oil, Gas, and Geothermal Resources (DOGGR), there were 68 operating companies working the Midway-Sunset field alone. While the names of most of these companies have changed, due to mergers, acquisitions, and liquidations, the production activities have been continuous.

In the early days of oil exploration and production, long before the advent of modern blowout preventions, gushers were the norm. Although there were many, the Lakeview Gusher gushed more than any, producing 100,000 barrels (16,000 m^{3}) of oil per day at its peak. In all, the Lakeview No.1 produced about nine million barrels (1,400,000 m^{3}) of oil (a very respectable cumulative production for a single well in this area). The well and its State historical marker can be found along the Petroleum Club road, just off SR 33 south of town.

=== Recent history ===
Taft was also the site of a military airfield, Gardner Army Airfield, which was used to train pilots during World War II. After the base was closed, its abandoned airstrip served as a clandestine dragstrip for many years.

The railroad—originally built to export crude oil and import drinking water—is gone, but the area still has a significant oil industry presence.

A private prison, Taft Correctional Institution, operated by Management & Training Corporation under contract to the U.S. Bureau of Prisons, is located on Cadet Road south of town. There is a large, modern high school serving area students. The West Kern Oil Museum, at 1168 Wood Street, has vast holdings, including pumps, fire apparatus, trucks, a historic wooden derrick, photos, models, and extensive displays of local history back to Indian times. The town's newspaper, the Midway Driller, was reputed to be the oldest daily newspaper in California. About 2005, the Daily Midway Driller became the Midway Driller and is now published on Tuesdays and Fridays. The town's second weekly newspaper, the Taft Independent, began publication on July 4, 2006.

The city owns a 46-acre former BNSF railroad property (19 ha) in the center of town which features the West Kern Oilworker's Monument, a 37 feet (11 m) tall bronze sculpture that features several human figures displayed on an oil derrick by artist Benjamin Victor that was paid for with donations from local residents, visitors and several oil companies. The railroad property is part of a redevelopment project that the city is using to attract new businesses, housing and commercial office space.

== Geography ==
=== Climate ===
Taft has a desert climate (Köppen BWh), with long, hot, dry summers, and brief, cool, moist winters. Rainfall averages only 5.39 in (137 mm) annually, mostly falling during winter and spring. Typically, no rain falls from June through September. The year with the most rainfall is 1998, with 17.61 in (447 mm). The year with the least rainfall is 2007, with 1.93 in (49 mm). The most rainfall in one month was 6.96 inches (177 mm), in February 1998. The most rainfall in one day was 1.48 inches (38 mm), on May 6, 1998. Taft averages 112.7 days with highs above 90 °F (32.2 °C) and 6.2 days with lows below 32 °F (0 °C). The highest recorded temperature in Taft is 112 °F (44.4 °C) on July 11, 2008. The lowest recorded temperature in Taft is 24 °F (−4.4 °C) on December 23, 1998.

Climate data for Taft, California (1994–2012 normals)
| Month | Jan | Feb | Mar | Apr | May | Jun | Jul | Aug | Sep | Oct | Nov | Dec | Year |
|---|---|---|---|---|---|---|---|---|---|---|---|---|---|
| Record high °F (°C) | 79 (26) | 84 (29) | 94 (34) | 97 (36) | 107 (42) | 108 (42) | 112 (44) | 111 (44) | 107 (42) | 100 (38) | 91 (33) | 80 (27) | 112 (44) |
| Mean daily maximum °F (°C) | 57.8 (14.3) | 62.2 (16.8) | 69.6 (20.9) | 75.2 (24.0) | 84.2 (29.0) | 91.8 (33.2) | 98.4 (36.9) | 97.3 (36.3) | 91.8 (33.2) | 79.6 (26.4) | 66.1 (18.9) | 58.4 (14.7) | 77.7 (25.4) |
| Mean daily minimum °F (°C) | 41.0 (5.0) | 44.0 (6.7) | 47.3 (8.5) | 49.7 (9.8) | 56.1 (13.4) | 60.5 (15.8) | 67.2 (19.6) | 65.0 (18.3) | 61.4 (16.3) | 53.9 (12.2) | 46.3 (7.9) | 40.9 (4.9) | 52.8 (11.6) |
| Record low °F (°C) | 26 (−3) | 28 (−2) | 29 (−2) | 30 (−1) | 40 (4) | 44 (7) | 42 (6) | 52 (11) | 45 (7) | 35 (2) | 26 (−3) | 24 (−4) | 24 (−4) |
| Average precipitation inches (mm) | 1.07 (27) | 1.29 (33) | 0.75 (19) | 0.5 (13) | 0.37 (9.4) | 0.03 (0.76) | 0 (0) | 0.01 (0.25) | 0.06 (1.5) | 0.28 (7.1) | 0.38 (9.7) | 0.65 (17) | 5.39 (137) |
| Average precipitation days (≥ 0.01 in) | 8 | 7 | 5 | 4 | 2 | 0 | 0 | 0 | 1 | 2 | 4 | 6 | 39 |
Source: TAFT, CALIFORNIA: Period of Record General Climate Summary

== Demographics ==
Historical population
| Census | Pop. | Note | %± |
|---|---|---|---|
| 1920 | 3,317 | | — |
| 1930 | 3,442 | | 3.8% |
| 1940 | 3,205 | | −6.9% |
| 1950 | 3,707 | | 15.7% |
| 1960 | 3,822 | | 3.1% |
| 1970 | 4,285 | | 12.1% |
| 1980 | 5,316 | | 24.1% |
| 1990 | 5,902 | | 11.0% |
| 2000 | 6,400 | | 8.4% |
| 2010 | 9,327 | | 45.7% |
| 2020 | 8,546 | | −8.4% |
U.S. Decennial Census

=== Racial and ethnic composition ===
Taft city, California – Racial and ethnic composition Note: the US Census treats Hispanic/Latino as an ethnic category. This table excludes Latinos from the racial categories and assigns them to a separate category. Hispanics/Latinos may be of any race.
| Race / Ethnicity (NH = Non-Hispanic) | Pop 2000 | Pop 2010 | Pop 2020 | % 2000 | % 2010 | % 2020 |
|---|---|---|---|---|---|---|
| White alone (NH) | 5,061 | 5,221 | 4,149 | 79.08% | 55.98% | 48.55% |
| Black or African American alone (NH) | 117 | 361 | 133 | 1.83% | 3.87% | 1.56% |
| Native American or Alaska Native alone (NH) | 47 | 72 | 61 | 0.73% | 0.77% | 0.71% |
| Asian alone (NH) | 67 | 92 | 136 | 1.05% | 0.99% | 1.59% |
| Native Hawaiian or Pacific Islander alone (NH) | 27 | 62 | 36 | 0.42% | 0.66% | 0.42% |
| Other race alone (NH) | 3 | 14 | 19 | 0.05% | 0.15% | 0.22% |
| Mixed race or Multiracial (NH) | 83 | 152 | 288 | 1.30% | 1.63% | 3.37% |
| Hispanic or Latino (any race) | 995 | 3,353 | 3,724 | 15.55% | 35.95% | 43.58% |
| Total | 6,400 | 9,327 | 8,546 | 100.00% | 100.00% | 100.00% |

=== 2020 census ===
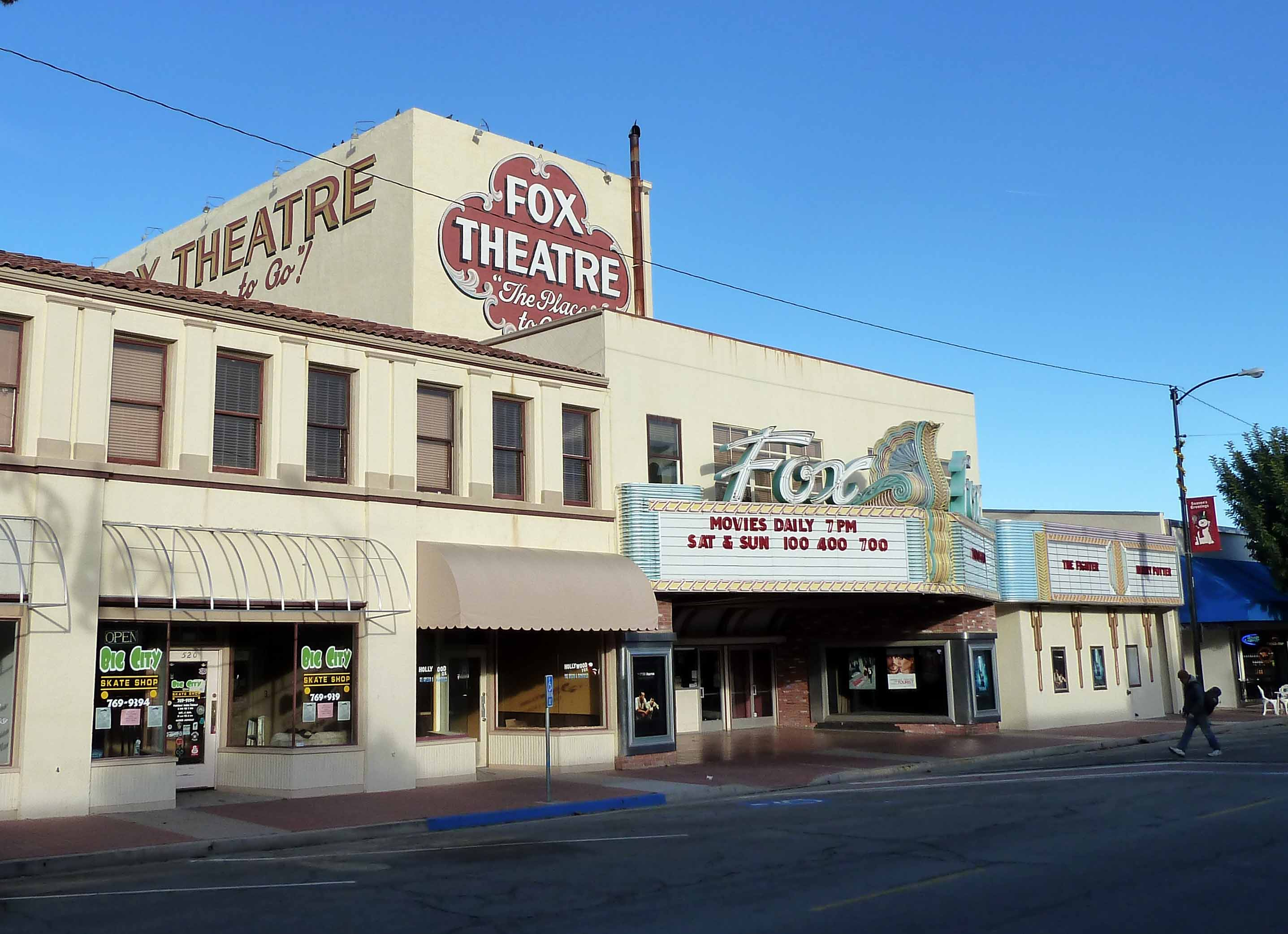
The Fox Theatre, downtown Taft.

As of the 2020 census, Taft had a population of 8,546. The population density was 559.6 inhabitants per square mile (216.1/km^{2}). The median age was 35.2 years. The age distribution was 22.1% under the age of 18, 11.0% aged 18 to 24, 32.2% aged 25 to 44, 23.5% aged 45 to 64, and 11.2% who were 65 years of age or older. For every 100 females, there were 137.1 males, and for every 100 females age 18 and over there were 151.2 males.

The census reported that 81.0% of the population lived in households, 1.3% lived in non-institutionalized group quarters, and 17.7% were institutionalized. 80.5% of residents lived in urban areas, while 19.5% lived in rural areas.

There were 2,379 households, out of which 41.9% included children under the age of 18, 47.4% were married-couple households, 10.4% were cohabiting couple households, 25.2% had a female householder with no spouse or partner present, and 17.0% had a male householder with no spouse or partner present. 21.9% of households were one person, and 11.9% had someone living alone who was 65 years of age or older. The average household size was 2.91. There were 1,687 families (70.9% of all households).

There were 2,596 housing units at an average density of 170.0 units per square mile (65.6 units/km^{2}), of which 2,379 (91.6%) were occupied and 8.4% were vacant. Of occupied units, 58.2% were owner-occupied and 41.8% were occupied by renters. The homeowner vacancy rate was 2.2%, and the rental vacancy rate was 7.7%.

=== Income and poverty ===
In 2023, the US Census Bureau estimated that the median household income was $64,479, and the per capita income was $31,344. About 9.3% of families and 17.7% of the population were below the poverty line.

=== 2010 census ===
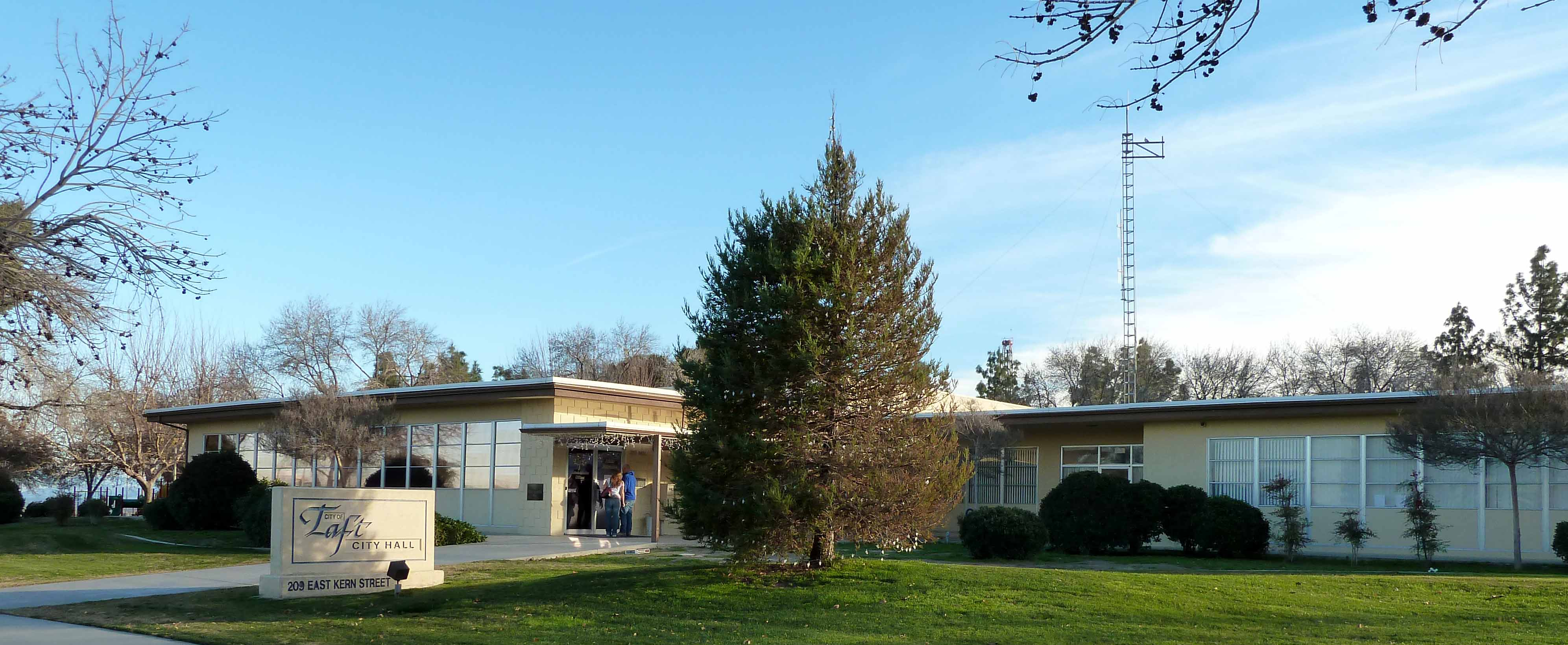
Taft City Hall

The 2010 United States census reported that Taft had a population of 9,327. The population density was 617.1 inhabitants per square mile (238.3/km^{2}). The racial makeup of Taft was 7,388 (79.2%) White, 396 (4.2%) African American, 118 (1.3%) Native American, 93 (1.0%) Asian, 65 (0.7%) Pacific Islander, 1,023 (11.0%) from other races, and 244 (2.6%) from two or more races. Hispanic or Latino of any race were 3,353 persons (35.9%).

The Census reported that 6,372 people (68.3% of the population) lived in households, 123 (1.3%) lived in non-institutionalized group quarters, and 2,832 (30.4%) were institutionalized.

There were 2,254 households, out of which 914 (40.6%) had children under the age of 18 living in them, 1,119 (49.6%) were opposite-sex married couples living together, 289 (12.8%) had a female householder with no husband present, 178 (7.9%) had a male householder with no wife present. There were 176 (7.8%) unmarried opposite-sex partnerships, and 9 (0.4%) same-sex married couples or partnerships. 543 households (24.1%) were made up of individuals, and 246 (10.9%) had someone living alone who was 65 years of age or older. The average household size was 2.83. There were 1,586 families (70.4% of all households); the average family size was 3.32.

The population was spread out, with 1,844 people (19.8%) under the age of 18, 1,041 people (11.2%) aged 18 to 24, 3,521 people (37.8%) aged 25 to 44, 2,136 people (22.9%) aged 45 to 64, and 785 people (8.4%) who were 65 years of age or older. The median age was 34.9 years. For every 100 females, there were 186.5 males. For every 100 females age 18 and over, there were 219.0 males.

There were 2,525 housing units at an average density of 167.1 per square mile (64.5/km^{2}), of which 1,375 (61.0%) were owner-occupied, and 879 (39.0%) were occupied by renters. The homeowner vacancy rate was 2.6%; the rental vacancy rate was 10.8%. 3,847 people (41.2% of the population) lived in owner-occupied housing units, and 2,525 people (27.1%) lived in rental housing units.

== Education ==
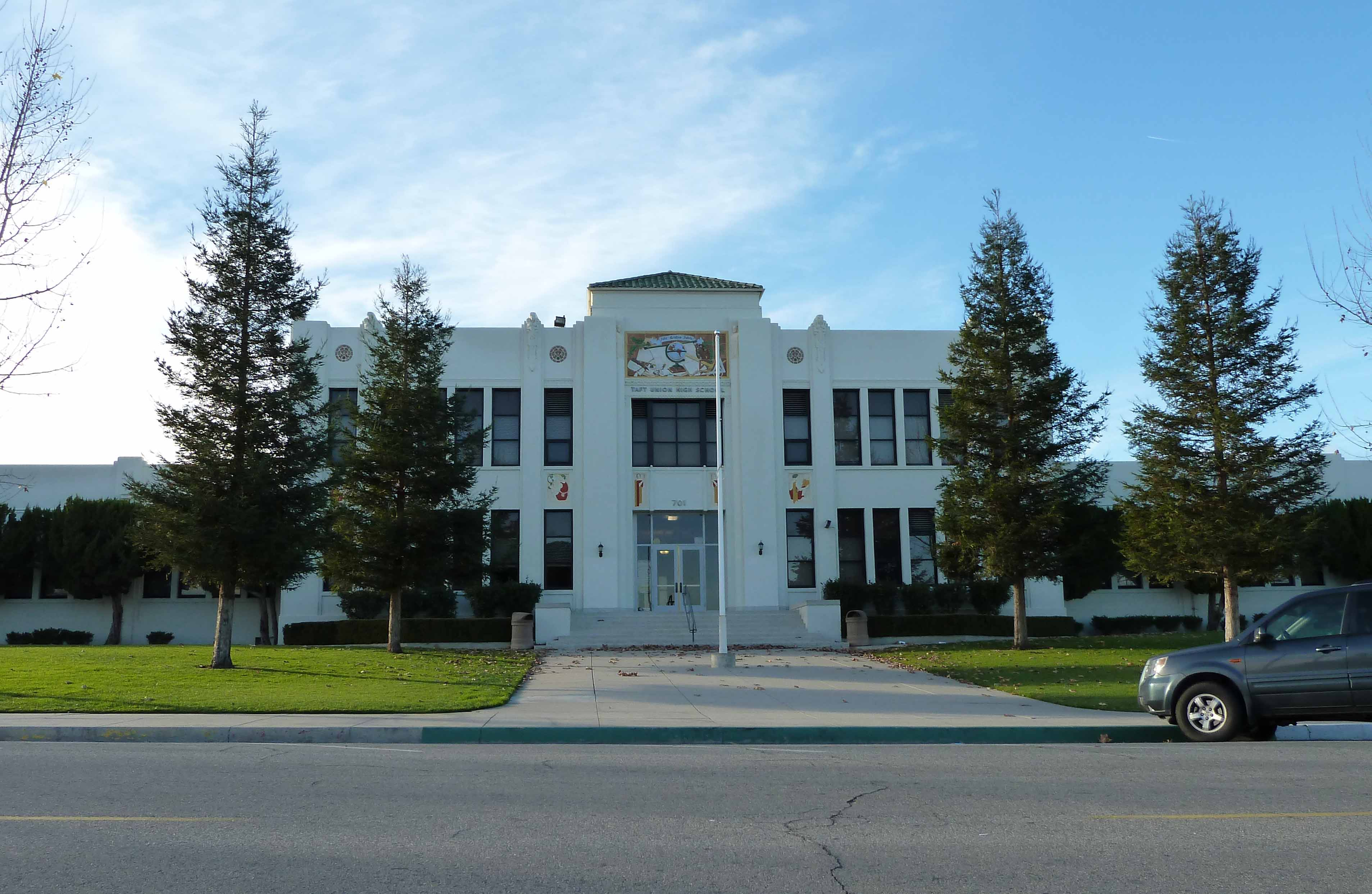
Taft Union High School

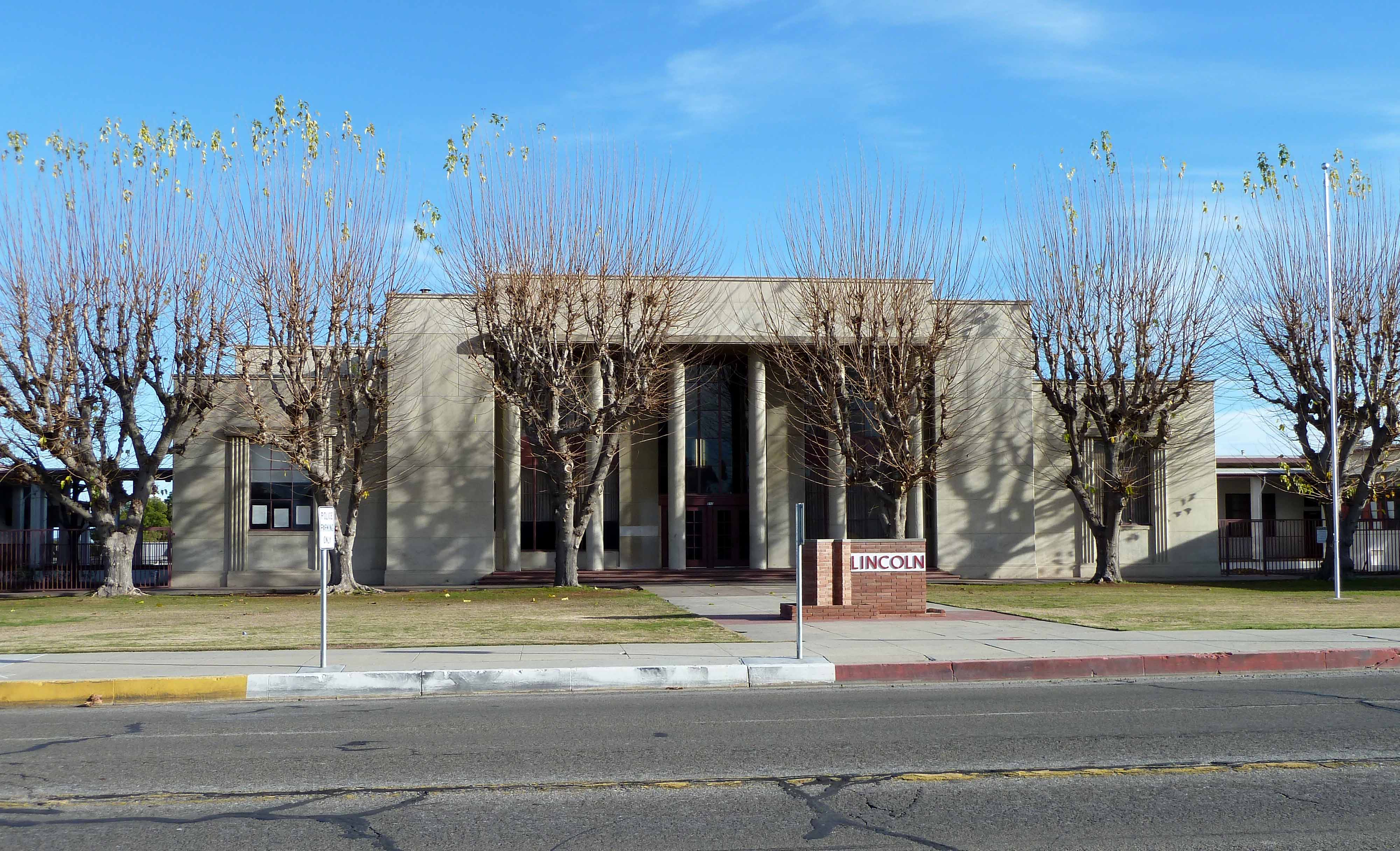
Lincoln Junior High School

Taft City School District operates elementary and junior high schools:

- Jefferson Elementary School
- Parkview Elementary School
- Conley Elementary School
- Taft Primary School
- Roosevelt Elementary School
- Lincoln Junior High School

Taft Union High School is the local high school.

Taft College is the community college.

== Government ==
=== Law enforcement ===
The Taft Police Department employs 16 sworn officers, 12 civilian employees, and 2 volunteers. It operates its own jail.

== Arts and culture ==
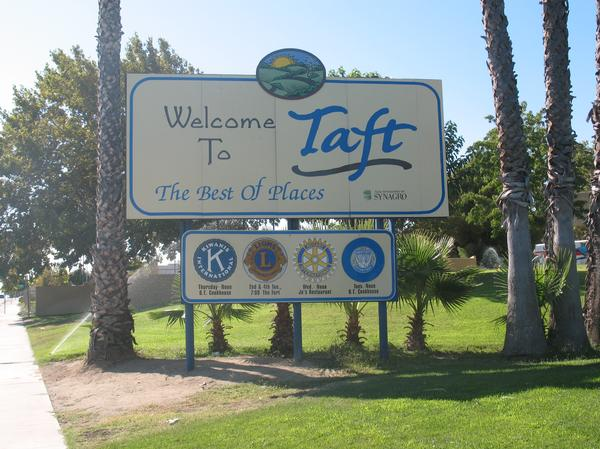
Welcome to Taft sign.

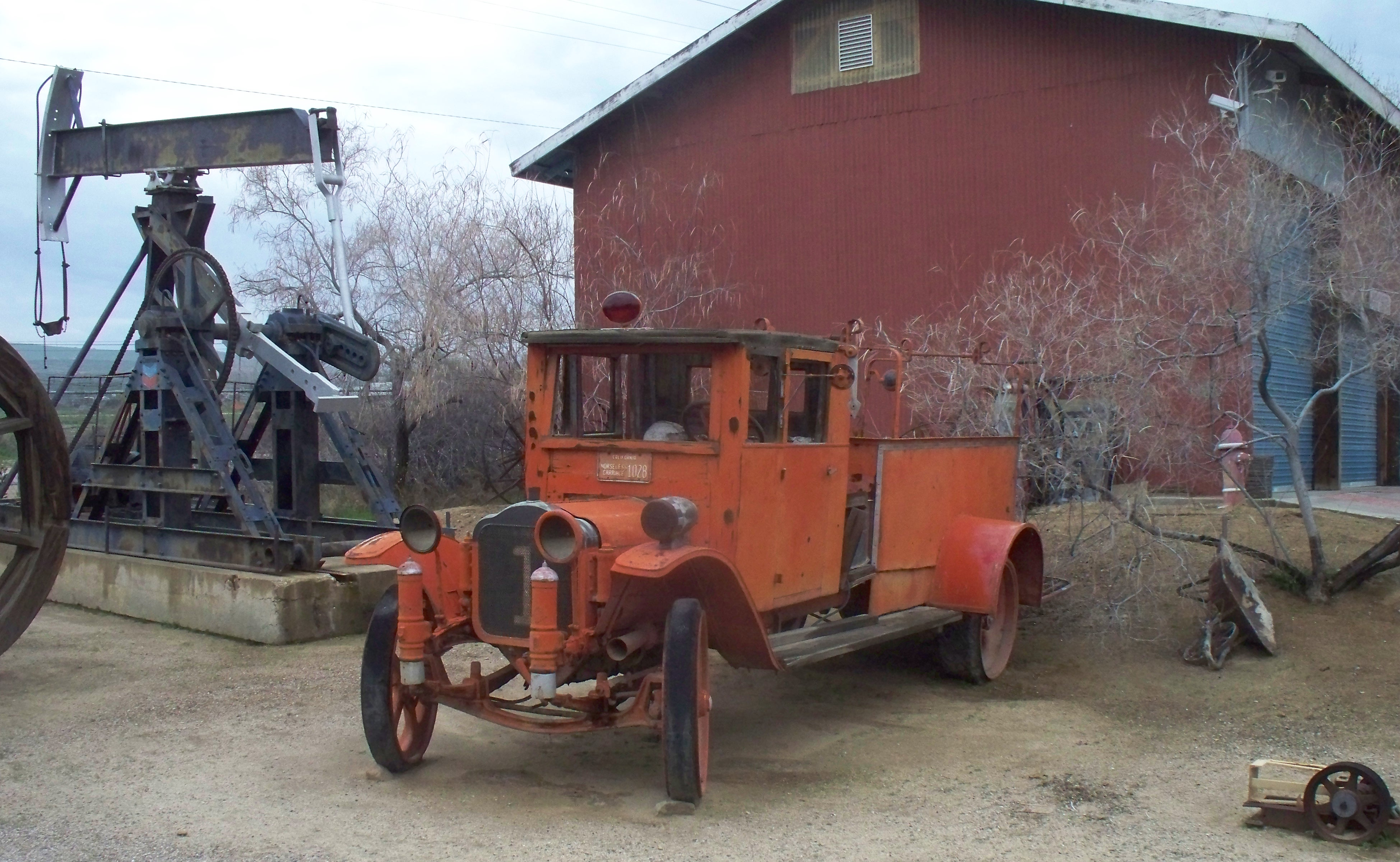
West Kern Oil Museum, old pumpjack and fire engine

In October 2010 Taft had its 100-year birthday.

Every five years during October, Taft holds a birthday celebration. This event began as a parade and civic luncheon, commemorating Taft's 20th birthday in November 1930. These celebrations were held every five years until World War II, during which time none were held.

After the war, in 1946, the celebrations began again and the Taft District Chamber of Commerce made them permanent. A contest was held to choose a name for the event, and "Oildorado" was chosen, having been submitted by W.A. Poff.

Oildorado is a week long celebration honoring the history of Taft as a place of oil production and exploration. There are several oilfield-type skill contests, including: welding, pipe threading and fitting, rod wrenching, various skill tests with a backhoe, and at least as late as 1965 a regular well-pulling contest with local well-servicing rigs and crews. Owing to safety and probably liability issues, the well-pulling contests ceased.

Additionally, there is a beauty pageant where an Oildorado Queen is selected, a facial hair growing contest, talent shows, barbecues, street fairs, parades, and in 2005, motocross races. People usually dress in cowboy boots and a cowboy hat throughout the week.

It is also customary for all men to grow facial hair during this time. If a man does not grow facial hair, he must pay for a permit and wear a bolo tie or lapel pin called a Smooth Puss Badge. If he is caught clean-shaven without his badge, he may be arrested by the Posse, a group of men dressed in western garb, sporting pistols and rifles filled with blanks and, of course, facial hair. The man will be placed in a jail truck called "The Hoosegow" and driven around town for an hour for all to see. Warrants may also be purchased to have somebody else arrested and placed in The Hoosegow.

The Posse is overseen by the Grand Marshal. The group patrols the streets, schools, and businesses and engages in make-believe shootouts with the Bandits (the Wooden Nickel Gang), who customarily wear bandanna masks on their faces.

Other staples of this week-long celebration include wooden nickels, dinner theatres, classic car shows, and rodeos.

== Attractions ==
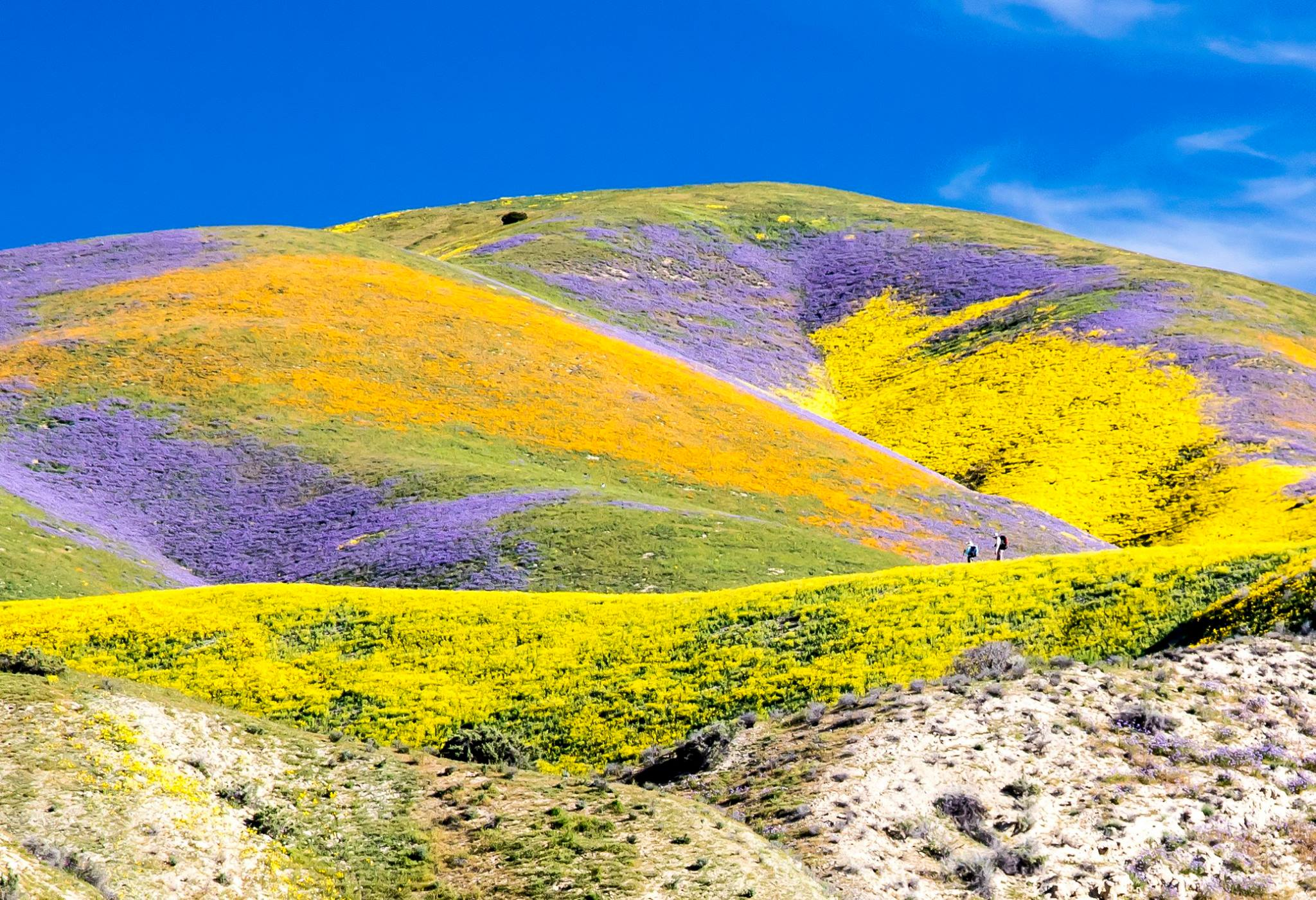
Superbloom in the Temblor Range in 2017, Carrizo Plain National Monument

Taft is the nearest town of any size to the Carrizo Plain National Monument, which is located about an hour west. Note that the shortest route (per Google Maps) has dirt sections and is not recommended for standard passenger cars. Like many dirt roads in the area, it becomes impassable after heavy rains.

The Temblor Recreation Area in the Temblor Range, property of the Bureau of Land Management, is less than three miles southwest of Taft.

== Transportation ==
Taft is located at the junction of State Route 33 and SR 119.

The City of Taft operates Taft-Maricopa Area Transit, with buses serving Taft and Maricopa. Kern Transit operates intercity transportation between Taft and Bakersfield.

Taft-Kern County Airport is located at the east edge of town and is a favorite for parachutists in Kern County and the South San Joaquin Valley.

== Notable people ==
- Sam Andrew, artist and founding member and guitarist of Big Brother and the Holding Company, born in Taft
- Bill Bagnall, editor and publisher, member of Motorcycle Hall of Fame
- Jordan Belfort, businessman and convicted felon, "Wolf of Wall Street"; not originally from Taft, spent time at Taft Correctional Institution
- Jeanne Cooper, actress
- Loren Cunningham, co-founder of Youth With A Mission
- Dennis Fimple, actor
- Leon Goldman, San Francisco-based surgeon and father of Dianne Feinstein
- Ron Graham, mathematician, juggler
- Bud Hobbs, country singer
- Billy Nelson, 2008 Olympian, track & field
- Tracy Rogers, NFL football player
- Ryan Shuck, guitarist
- Benjamin Victor, sculptor

== In popular culture ==
- Call Out My Name. A 2018 music video by The Weeknd; exterior shots of the music video were filmed at the intersection of Center and 4th St. with Wilson's Taft Hardware store visible, interior shots filmed at Fox Theatre.
- 25 Hill
- Attack of the 50 Ft. Woman
- The Best of Times. A 1986 movie, starring Robin Williams and Kurt Russell, set in Taft.
- Five Easy Pieces. The main character of the 1970 movie, Robert Eroica Dupea (portrayed by Jack Nicholson), lives in a small house on the corner of Philippine Street and 5th Ave with his girlfriend Rayette Dipesto.
- A Girl Walks Home Alone at Night
- Meteor
- No Breaks. A 1976 film detailing the town's attempts to break the world record for longest loaf of bread and longest submarine sandwich in the Guinness Book of World Records, which it did successfully.
- Thelma & Louise
- Too Young to Die?
- Robbers by The 1975. A music video directed by Tim Matti in 2014. The video depicts a couple who rob a shop to obtain money to "fund their alcohol and drug addiction."
- John Dies at the End. A 2012 film based on the book of the same name written by David Wong, which features many of Taft's iconic Center Street scenes.
- Break Up. A 1998 film starring Kiefer Sutherland and Bridget Fonda.
- Today. A 1993 music video by The Smashing Pumpkins; opens with Billy Corgan sitting on the curb outside Wilson's Taft Hardware store.
- California's Gold, Episode 609
- California's Gold, Episode 13002
- Oildorado - Road Trip with Huell Howser Episode 137
- There Will Be Blood

== See also ==
- List of sundown towns in the United States
