= California State Route 223 =

Highway in California

State Route 223
- Bear Mountain Boulevard
- SR 223 highlighted in red

Route information
- Maintained by Caltrans
- Length: 31.92 mi (51.37 km)

Major junctions
- West end: I-5 near Taft
- SR 99 near Greenfield; SR 184 near Weedpatch
- East end: SR 58 near Bealville

Location
- Country: United States
- State: California
- Counties: Kern

Highway system
- State highways in California; Interstate; US; State; Scenic; History; Pre‑1964; Unconstructed; Deleted; Freeways
← SR 222	→ SR 224

State Route 223 (SR 223), locally known as Bear Mountain Boulevard, is a state highway in the U.S. state of California that runs west to east through the agricultural land south of Bakersfield in Kern County. Running from Interstate 5 (I-5) to State Route 58 near the city of Arvin, it also intersects with State Route 99 near Greenfield. SR 223 forms a truck route for transporting goods to the three main corridors in the area, I-5, SR 58 and SR 99, without having to drive through Bakersfield.

== Route description ==
Route 223 is defined in section 523 of the California Streets and Highways Code:

Route 223 is from:
(a) Route 5 to Route 99 south of Greenfield.
(b) Route 99 south of Greenfield to Route 58.

State Route 223 begins at Interstate 5. From there it travels east through relatively flat agricultural land. It crosses SR 99 and Union Avenue (SR 99 Business). It then crosses Weedpatch Highway (SR 184)/Wheeler Ridge Road, which is the local north-south highway serving the region. Continuing east, it crosses through the only city served by the route, the agricultural community of Arvin. It continues through agricultural land, before reaching the eastern end of the San Joaquin Valley. The terrain changes to rolling hills, as the road climbs the Tehachapi Mountains. The highway terminates at SR 58.

A portion of SR 223 near SR 99 is part of the National Highway System, a network of highways that are considered essential to the country's economy, defense, and mobility by the Federal Highway Administration.

== History ==
State Route 223 eastbound at State Route 184

Bear Mountain Boulevard was constructed in 1915, as the bypass to White Wolf Road to the south; the road still exists, but is on private property. It is not known when White Wolf Road was constructed. The road was a part of the Midway Route, which was the most direct route between the San Joaquin Valley and Los Angeles via Tehachapi Pass and the Mojave Desert. After the Ridge Route was constructed in 1915, the Midway Route was still important as the primary bypass to the newly constructed highway. Bear Mountain Boulevard served as part of the Midway Route until 1933, when Bena Road was constructed to provide a more direct connection to Bakersfield. Today, the Midway Route is served by SR 58 and SR 14.

In 1933, Bear Mountain Boulevard was adopted as an unsigned state highway. It was a part of Legislative Route 140, which ran from Taft to US 99 (locally known as Taft Highway), and from US 99 to US 466. The Taft Highway portion was signed as US 399, but the Bear Mountain Boulevard section was unsigned. It was dropped from the route in 1959, and became Legislative Route 264. In 1964, with the renumbering of California’s state routes, Bear Mountain Boulevard became a signed route as SR 223, and was extended west to I-5.

== Major intersections ==
Except where prefixed with a letter, postmiles were measured on the road as it was in 1964, based on the alignment that existed at the time, and do not necessarily reflect current mileage. Postmile prefixes include: R reflecting a realignment in the route since then, M indicating a second realignment, L referring to an overlap due to a correction or change, and T indicating postmiles classified as temporary. Segments that remain unconstructed or have been relinquished to local control may be omitted. The entire route is in Kern County.

Location	Postmile	Destinations	Notes
	1.85	Bear Mountain Boulevard	Continuation beyond I-5
	1.85	I-5 (West Side Freeway) – Sacramento, Los Angeles	Interchange; west end of SR 223; I-5 exit 239
	4.86	Old River Road – Old River	
	8.89	Wible Road – Pumpkin Center	
	R10.54	SR 99 – Los Angeles, Bakersfield, Sacramento	Interchange; SR 99 exit 13
	10.94	SR 99 Bus. (Union Avenue) – Los Angeles, Greenfield, Bakersfield	Former US 99
	R16.01	SR 184 north (Weedpatch Highway) / Wheeler Ridge Road – Lamont	Roundabout; southern terminus of SR 184
Arvin	20.15	Comanche Drive	
	31.92	SR 58 – Mojave, Bakersfield	East end of SR 223
1.000 mi = 1.609 km; 1.000 km = 0.621 mi
