= California State Route 58 =

Major state highway in California

State Route 58
- SR 58 highlighted in red

Route information
- Maintained by Caltrans
- Length: 241 mi (388 km)
- Existed: 1964–present

Major junctions
- West end: US 101 near Santa Margarita
- SR 229 near Santa Margarita; SR 33 at McKittrick; I-5 from near Buttonwillow to near Tupman; SR 43 in Rosedale; SR 99 in Bakersfield; SR 204 in Bakersfield; SR 184 near East Niles; SR 223 near Bealville; SR 14 near Mojave; US 395 at Kramer Junction
- East end: I-15 in Barstow

Location
- Country: United States
- State: California
- Counties: San Luis Obispo, Kern, San Bernardino

Highway system
- State highways in California; Interstate; US; State; Scenic; History; Pre‑1964; Unconstructed; Deleted; Freeways
← SR 57	→ SR 59

State Route 58 (SR 58) is a major east-west state highway in the U.S. state of California that runs across the Coast Ranges, the southern San Joaquin Valley, the Tehachapi Mountains, which border the southern Sierra Nevada, and the Mojave Desert. It runs between U.S. Route 101 near Santa Margarita and Interstate 15 in Barstow. It has junctions with Interstate 5 near Buttonwillow, State Route 99 in Bakersfield, State Route 202 in Tehachapi, State Route 14 near Mojave, and U.S. Route 395 at Kramer Junction. SR 58 also provides access to Edwards Air Force Base.

== Route description ==
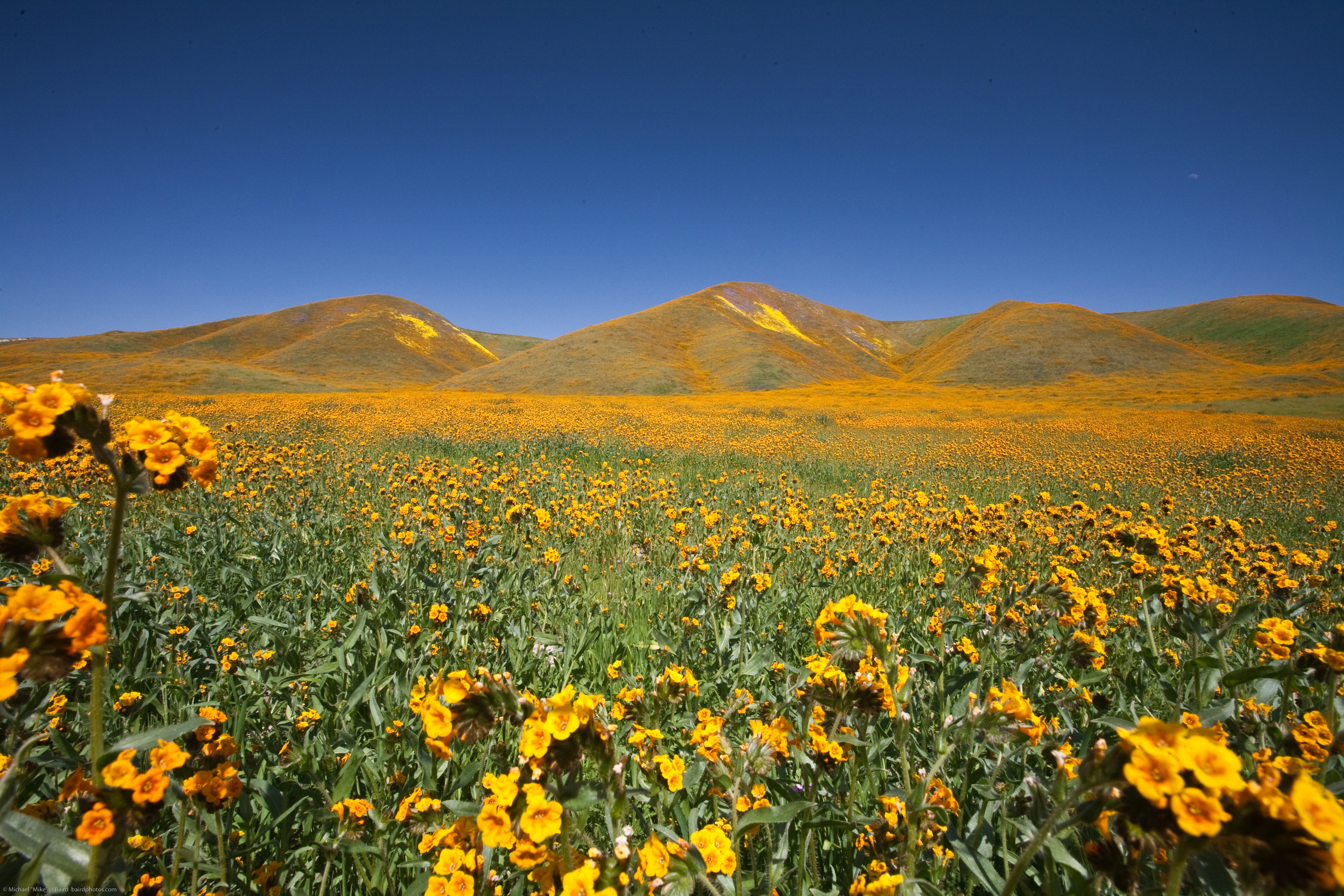
Spring Wildflowers off SR 58 near California Valley, 2010

Route 58 is defined as follows in section 358, subdivision (a), of the California Streets and Highways Code:

Route 58 is from:
(1) Route 101 near Santa Margarita to Route 33.
(2) Route 33 to Route 43.
(3) Route 43 to just west of Van Buren Place near Bakersfield.
(4) Mohawk Street near Bakersfield to Route 99.
(5) Route 99 to Route 15 near Barstow via Bakersfield and Mojave.

Due to ongoing freeway construction projects in Bakersfield and unincorporated Kern and San Bernardino counties, the definition was last amended by the legislature in 2014 and may not accurately reflect current or former rights of way maintained by Caltrans. The definition also omits Route 58's concurrencies with other routes instead of duplicating those segments in those other routes' definitions in the code. In addition, section 558 subdivision (b) permits the state to relinquish control of the former rights of way located in Bakersfield and in unincorporated Kern County to local jurisdictions. Subdivision (c) further mandates that for the relinquished former portions of the highway, the city and the county must still "maintain within their respective jurisdictions signs directing motorists to the continuation of Route 58".

State Route 58 between Santa Margarita and Buttonwillow is a winding mountain road through a thinly populated area. From its westernmost terminus at US 101 near Santa Margarita, a few miles north of San Luis Obispo, SR 58 heads east along the former US 101 (El Camino Real) for one mile. SR 58 then heads east and up the winding mountain road, passing through a thinly populated area and an intersection with SR 229. Alternatives such as SR 46 to the north or SR 166 to the south are recommended, as much of this section of SR 58 is prohibited to truck traffic. However, this section of SR 58 does pass through the Carrizo Plain, which is known for its scenic beauty and geological features, including the San Andreas Fault. SR 58 then takes another winding road before joining with State Route 33 in the small town of McKittrick. SR 33 then splits at the north end of McKittrick before SR 58 then enters another, but brief winding road. SR 58 then proceeds northeast for several miles before changing to an east-west alignment and reaching Buttonwillow. SR 58 then joins with the north-south Interstate 5 (I-5) for a few miles to Stockdale Highway, where it resumes heading east and intersects with State Route 43 before reaching Bakersfield. In Bakersfield, the route follows the Westside Parkway to reach State Route 99 at the West Bakersfield Interchange.

East of SR 99, SR 58 briefly enters expressway status with two at-grade intersections in the Caliente area before resuming freeway status east of Caliente. SR 58 then reaches the Tehachapi city limits and traverses the Tehachapi Pass before dropping out of the Tehachapi Mountains into the Antelope Valley at the town of Mojave. Freeway conditions continue from State Route 14 east of Mojave bypassing North Edwards, Edwards Air Force Base, Boron, and Kramer Junction. Approximately 10 miles (16 km) east of an interchange with U.S. Route 395, SR 58 resumes expressway status with two lanes in each direction until just before reaching the easternmost terminus at Interstate 15 in Barstow.

With the lack of multi-lane divided highways that cross the Sierra Nevada between SR 58 at the Tehachapi Pass and Interstate 80 at Donner Summit several hundred miles to the north, I-5 and SR 58 are used by motorists to travel between Northern California and points to the southeast, such as Las Vegas (via I-15) and the Interstate 40 corridor, without having to face the extreme traffic congestion of greater Los Angeles.

SR 58 is part of the California Freeway and Expressway System, and east of I-5 is part of the National Highway System, a network of highways that are considered essential to the country's economy, defense, and mobility by the Federal Highway Administration. SR 58 is eligible for the State Scenic Highway System, but it is not officially designated as a scenic highway by the California Department of Transportation.

== Names and memorials ==
The entirety of SR 58 is designated as a Blue Star Memorial Highway. Various segments also have additional names or memorial designations.

Various points of SR 58 near Santa Margarita and Creston are known as the Calf Canyon Highway or the Carrisa Highway. The portion of SR 58 from Barstow to Bakersfield is sometimes referred to as the Barstow–Bakersfield Highway. Similarly, the segment from Bakersfield to McKittrick is sometimes known as the Bakersfield-McKittrick Highway, the segment from Bakersfield to Tehachapi is sometimes known as the Bakersfield Tehachapi Highway, and the segment from Mojave to Barstow is sometimes known as the Mojave-Barstow Highway.

The freeway segment of SR 58 running from Stockdale Highway (near Heath Road) east to Truxtun Avenue is named the Westside Parkway. The Westside Parkway's eastern extension from Truxtun Avenue to SR 99 is also known as the Centennial Corridor.

The segment between SR 99 and SR 184 is named the Rosa Parks Highway, honoring civil rights activist Rosa Parks. The segment between SR 184 and the Kern County–San Bernardino County Line is named the Kern County Korean War Veterans Memorial Highway, honoring approximately 8,120 Korean War veterans from Kern County.

== History ==
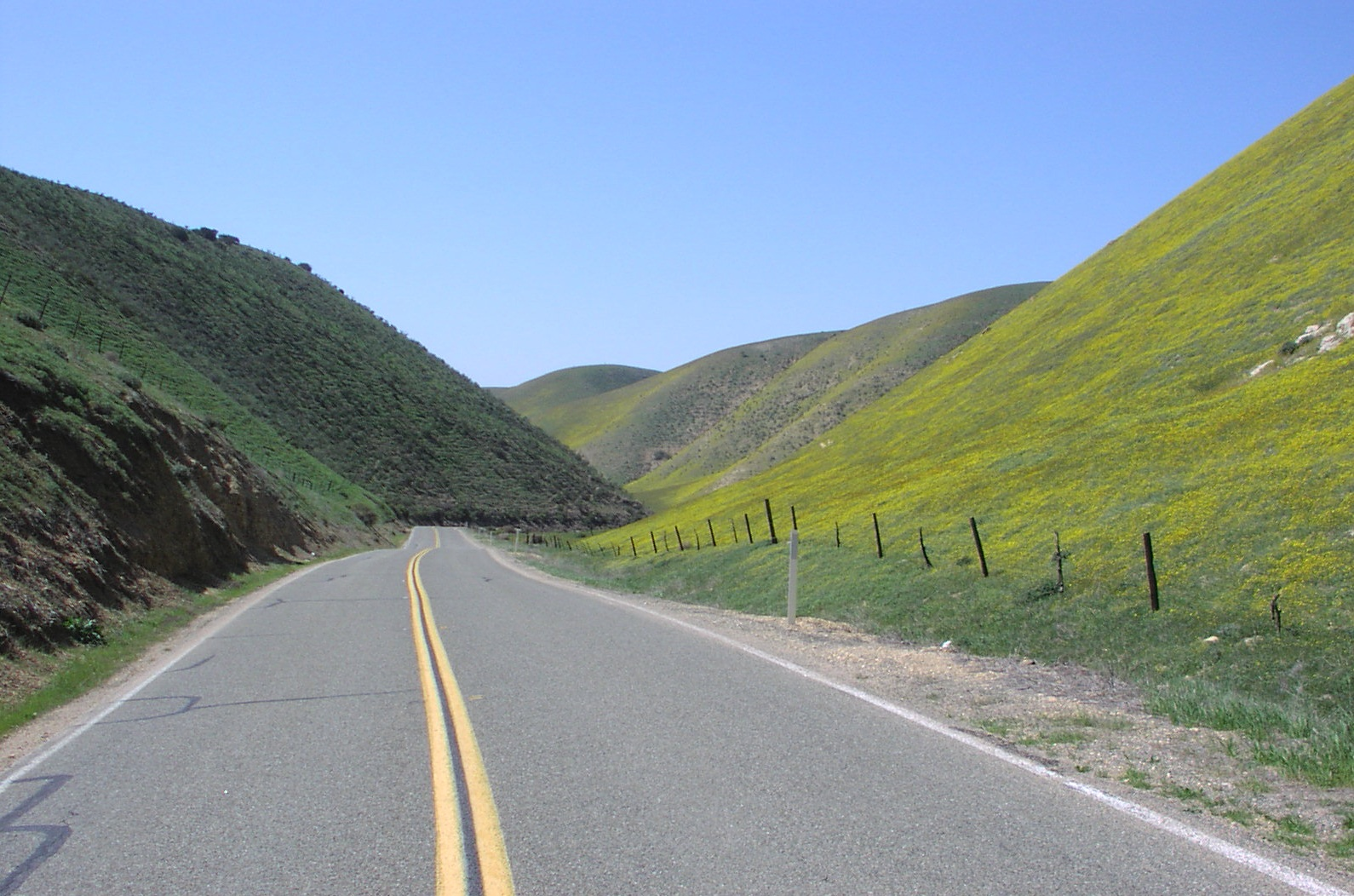
Westbound SR 58 in the Temblor Range, descending into the Carrizo Plain

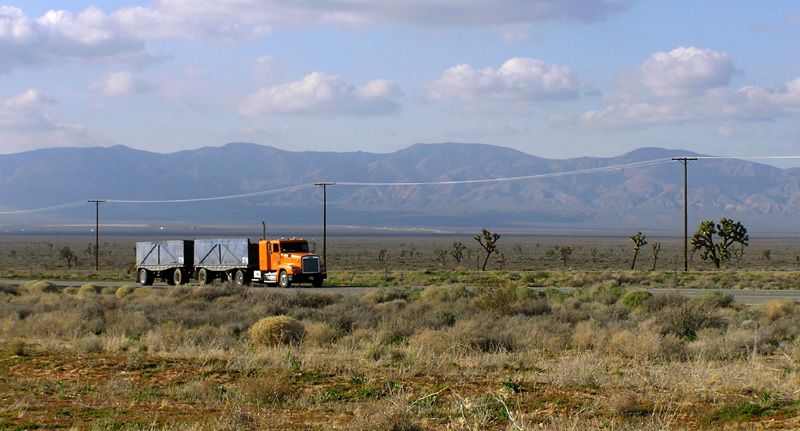
A truck passes eastbound along the busy SR 58 through the Antelope Valley. The Tehachapi Mountains are visible in the distance.

State Route 58 did not exist as a California sign route until 1964, although previous to 1964, it was part of California Legislative Route 58. The other part of Legislative Route 58 is California's segment of Interstate 40; previous to 1964 it was a segment of US 66.

Prior to 1964, the segment of State Route 58 between Bakersfield and Barstow was signed U.S. Route 466. Also at that time, the segment of SR 58 between State Route 33 at McKittrick and State Route 99 in Bakersfield was signed as State Route 178. Although it was proposed for signing as Route 178 in 1934, the segment of Legislative Route 58 between US 101 near Santa Margarita and State Route 33 at McKittrick was not signed prior to 1964.

Note that US 466 was co-signed with US 99, now State Route 99, between Bakersfield and Famoso Junction. Between Famoso and US 101 at Paso Robles, US 466 largely became SR 46.

The eastern terminus was originally at I-15 in northeastern Barstow. SR 58 was rerouted to I-15 in Barstow south of the I-40 interchange in c. 2000. The former eastern terminus is now known as "Old Highway 58".

Freeway bypasses in Tehachapi, Boron, Mojave, Hinkley, and Kramer Junction were completed in c. 1975, 1981, 2003, 2017, and 2019, respectively.

=== Westside Parkway and the Centennial Corridor Project ===
In western Bakersfield, the Westside Parkway, a freeway running from Stockdale Highway (near Heath Road) east to Truxtun Avenue, was completed on April 15, 2015, with interchanges in between at Allen Road, Calloway Drive, Coffee Road, and Mohawk Street. Opening in stages since 2013, the road was originally under the jurisdiction of the city of Bakersfield. As part of the Centennial Corridor project, Caltrans built an extension of the Westside Parkway east to the junction of SR 58 and SR 99 at the West Bakersfield Interchange. Although construction was controversial since it displaced dozens of homes and businesses, by September 2017, all but a few buildings in the path had been demolished.

On February 5, 2021, the city transferred the Westside Parkway to Caltrans and California Highway Patrol jurisdiction. City officials then announced in October 2022 that the project was nearly complete, and that they were working on the last 800 feet of the connection, specifically, the northbound SR 99 to westbound SR 58 transition ramp, with an estimated 8 months of construction left at the time. Meanwhile, Caltrans began installing signage rerouting SR 58 traffic from I-5 onto Stockdale Highway and the Westside Parkway east to at least Mohawk Street. Prior to, SR 58 immediately headed due east from I-5 to briefly join SR 43, then ran to Bakersfield along Rosedale Highway.

The Centennial Corridor was inaugurated on February 9, 2024, with a ceremonial bicycle ride, and officially opened to traffic on February 17, 2024. The rest of SR 58 on Rosedale Highway between Mohawk Street and SR 99 is planned to be transferred to city control. Future plans are to upgrade Stockdale Highway from I-5 to Heath Road as a freeway.

== Major intersections ==
Except where prefixed with a letter, postmiles were measured on the road as it was in 1964, based on the alignment that existed at the time, and do not necessarily reflect current mileage. Postmile prefixes include: R reflecting a realignment in the route since then, M indicating a second realignment, L referring to an overlap due to a correction or change, and T indicating postmiles classified as temporary. Segments that remain unconstructed or have been relinquished to local control may be omitted. The numbers reset at county lines; the start and end postmiles in each county are given in the county column.

County	Location	Postmile	Exit	Destinations	Notes
San Luis Obispo; SLO 0.00-57.15		0.00		US 101 – San Francisco, San Luis Obispo, Los Angeles	Interchange; western terminus; US 101 exit 211
San Luis Obispo; SLO 0.00-57.15		6.89		SR 229 north – Creston, Shandon	Southern terminus of SR 229
San Luis Obispo; SLO 0.00-57.15		45.20		Soda Lake Road – California Valley, Soda Lake	Serves Carrizo Plain National Monument
Kern; KER 0.00-R143.86	McKittrick	15.41 33.45 (Note: Indicates that the postmile represents the distance along SR 33 rather than SR 58.)		SR 33 south – Taft	West end of SR 33 overlap
Kern; KER 0.00-R143.86	McKittrick	34.29 15.42		SR 33 north – Coalinga	East end of SR 33 overlap
Kern; KER 0.00-R143.86	Buttonwillow	27.28		Buttonwillow Drive to I-5 north	
Kern; KER 0.00-R143.86	Buttonwillow	31.64 52.15 (Note: Indicates that the postmile represents the distance along I-5 rather than SR 58.)		I-5 north (West Side Freeway) – Sacramento	Interchange; west end of I-5 overlap; connects to former SR 58 east; I-5 south exit 257
Kern; KER 0.00-R143.86	Buttonwillow	31.64 52.15		West end of freeway on I-5	
Kern; KER 0.00-R143.86		47.55 R34.52		East end of freeway on I-5	
Kern; KER 0.00-R143.86		47.55 R34.52		I-5 south (West Side Freeway) – Los Angeles	Interchange; east end of I-5 overlap; I-5 north exit 253
Kern; KER 0.00-R143.86	Rosedale	R39.25		SR 43 (Enos Lane) to I-5 south – Shafter	Roundabout
Kern; KER 0.00-R143.86	Rosedale	R43.59		Stockdale Highway east	At-grade intersection; serves California State University, Bakersfield
Kern; KER 0.00-R143.86	Rosedale	R43.59		West end of freeway and Westside Parkway	
Kern; KER 0.00-R143.86	Bakersfield	R45.38	—	Allen Road	
Kern; KER 0.00-R143.86	Bakersfield	R47.05	—	Calloway Drive	Signed as separate north and south exits westbound
Kern; KER 0.00-R143.86	Bakersfield	R48.54	—	Coffee Road	
Kern; KER 0.00-R143.86	Bakersfield	R50.10	—	Mohawk Street	
Kern; KER 0.00-R143.86	Bakersfield	R50.56	—	Truxtun Avenue east	Eastbound exit and westbound entrance
Kern; KER 0.00-R143.86	Bakersfield	T52.14– R52.36	—	Real Road	Former westbound exit and eastbound entrance; demolished during the Westside Parkway extension construction
Kern; KER 0.00-R143.86	Bakersfield	T52.14– R52.36	110A	SR 99 south – Los Angeles	West Bakersfield Interchange; signed as exit 110 eastbound; east end of Westside Parkway; eastbound exit provides access to Ming Avenue (exit 23 on SR 99); SR 99 exit 24
Kern; KER 0.00-R143.86	Bakersfield	T52.14– R52.36	110B	SR 99 north – Fresno, Sacramento	West Bakersfield Interchange; westbound exit and eastbound entrance; SR 99 exit 24; former SR 58 west
Kern; KER 0.00-R143.86	Bakersfield	R53.39– R53.52	111	Chester Avenue / H Street	
Kern; KER 0.00-R143.86	Bakersfield	R54.42	112	SR 204 north (Union Avenue)	Former US 99; southern terminus of SR 204
Kern; KER 0.00-R143.86	Bakersfield	R55.40	113	Martin Luther King Jr. Boulevard	Formerly Cottonwood Road
Kern; KER 0.00-R143.86	Bakersfield	R56.41	114	Mount Vernon Avenue	
Kern; KER 0.00-R143.86	Bakersfield	R57.41	115	Oswell Street	
Kern; KER 0.00-R143.86	Fairfax	R58.44	116	Fairfax Road	
Kern; KER 0.00-R143.86		R59.44	117	SR 184 (Weedpatch Highway, Morning Drive) – Lamont	Weedpatch Highway not signed westbound, Morning Drive not signed eastbound
Kern; KER 0.00-R143.86	Edison	R61.51	119	Edison Road – Edison	
Kern; KER 0.00-R143.86		R63.58	121	Comanche Drive – Arvin, Edison	
Kern; KER 0.00-R143.86		R65.68	123	Tower Line Road	
Kern; KER 0.00-R143.86		69.75	127	General Beale Road	
Kern; KER 0.00-R143.86		75.59	East end of freeway		
Kern; KER 0.00-R143.86		75.63		SR 223 west – Arvin	Eastern terminus of SR 223
Kern; KER 0.00-R143.86		77.26		West end of freeway	
Kern; KER 0.00-R143.86	Keene	80.24	137	Hart Flat Road	
Kern; KER 0.00-R143.86	Keene	81.00	Weigh station (eastbound only)		
Kern; KER 0.00-R143.86	Keene	82.06	139	Keene (Woodford-Tehachapi Road)	
Kern; KER 0.00-R143.86	Keene	R85.15	142	Broome Road	
Kern; KER 0.00-R143.86	Tehachapi	R90.72	148	SR 202 west (SR 58 Bus. east) – Tehachapi	Eastern terminus of SR 202
Kern; KER 0.00-R143.86	Tehachapi	R91.67	149	Mill Street	
Kern; KER 0.00-R143.86	Tehachapi	R94.15	Tehachapi Summit, elevation 4,064 feet (1,239 m)		
Kern; KER 0.00-R143.86	Tehachapi	R94.16	151	Tehachapi Boulevard (SR 58 Bus. west)	Former US 466
Kern; KER 0.00-R143.86		R99.49	156	Sand Canyon Road – Monolith	
Kern; KER 0.00-R143.86		R101.56	159	Cameron Road	Pacific Crest Trail crossing
Kern; KER 0.00-R143.86		R105.60	Weigh station (westbound only)		
Kern; KER 0.00-R143.86		R108.90	165	SR 58 Bus. east – Mojave	Former US 466 east / SR 58 east
Kern; KER 0.00-R143.86		R111.13	167	SR 14 – Bishop, Mojave	Former US 6
Kern; KER 0.00-R143.86		R116.22	172	SR 58 Bus. west – Mojave	Former US 466 west / SR 58 west
Kern; KER 0.00-R143.86		R117.93	East end of freeway		
Kern; KER 0.00-R143.86		R117.93		25th Street	
Kern; KER 0.00-R143.86		R127.63		California City Boulevard – California City	
Kern; KER 0.00-R143.86		R127.63		West end of freeway	
Kern; KER 0.00-R143.86		R129.67	186	Edwards AFB (Rosamond Boulevard north gate)	
Kern; KER 0.00-R143.86	North Edwards	R132.04	188	Clay Mine Road	
Kern; KER 0.00-R143.86		R136.40	193	Twenty Mule Team Road	Former US 466 east
Kern; KER 0.00-R143.86		R137.77	194	Gephart Road / Rocket Site Road	Rocket Site Road not signed westbound
Kern; KER 0.00-R143.86		R139.00	Boron Rest Area		
Kern; KER 0.00-R143.86	Boron	R139.80	196	Borax Road (SR 58 Bus. east) / Rocket Site Road	Rocket Site Road not signed eastbound
Kern; KER 0.00-R143.86	Boron	R142.87	199	Boron Avenue	
San Bernardino; SBD R0.00-R34.81	Kramer Junction	R5.40	206	US 395 (SR 58 Bus. west) – Bishop, San Bernardino	
San Bernardino; SBD R0.00-R34.81			East end of freeway		
San Bernardino; SBD R0.00-R34.81			West end of freeway		
San Bernardino; SBD R0.00-R34.81	Hinkley	R26.33	227	Hinkley Road	
San Bernardino; SBD R0.00-R34.81		R30.39	231	Lenwood Road	
San Bernardino; SBD R0.00-R34.81	Barstow	R33.65	—	CR 66 (West Main Street)	Former US 66 / US 91
San Bernardino; SBD R0.00-R34.81	Barstow	R34.81	—	I-15 (Mojave Freeway) to I-40 – Las Vegas, San Bernardino	Eastern terminus; I-15 exit 179
1.000 mi = 1.609 km; 1.000 km = 0.621 mi: Closed/former; Concurrency terminus; Incomplete access

== Business loops ==
=== Tehachapi ===
State Route 58 Business
- Location: Tehachapi

State Route 58 Business (SR 58 Bus.) is a business route of California State Route 58 in Tehachapi. It provides access to downtown Tehachapi as Tehachapi Boulevard. It also follows the former routing of U.S. Route 466 and is overlapped with State Route 202.

Major intersections

The entire route is in Tehachapi, Kern County.

mi	km	Destinations	Notes
0.00	0.00	SR 58 – Bakersfield, Barstow	Interchange; western terminus; west end of SR 202 overlap; eastern terminus of SR 202; SR 58 exit 148
0.8	1.3	SR 202 west (Tucker Road)	East end of SR 202 overlap; serves California Correctional Institution
4.1	6.6	SR 58 – Mojave, Bakersfield	Interchange; eastern terminus; SR 58 exit 151
4.1	6.6	Tehachapi Boulevard – Monolith	Continuation beyond SR 58; former US 466 east
1.000 mi = 1.609 km; 1.000 km = 0.621 mi: Concurrency terminus

=== Mojave ===
State Route 58 Business
- Location: Mojave

State Route 58 Business (SR 58 Bus.) is a business route of California State Route 58 that runs through Mojave. It provides access to downtown Mojave as Mojave-Barstow Highway. It follows mostly the former routing of U.S. Route 466.

Major intersections

The entire route is in Kern County.

Location	mi	km	Destinations	Notes
	0.00	0.00	California City Boulevard	Continuation beyond SR 58; connects to SR 14
	0.00	0.00	SR 58 – Bakersfield, Barstow	Interchange; western terminus; SR 58 exit 165; former US 466 west
Mojave	3.6	5.8	SR 14 north – Bishop, Reno	West end of SR 14 overlap; former US 6 north
Mojave	4.9	7.9	SR 14 south – Los Angeles	East end of SR 14 overlap; former US 6 south
	8.9	14.3	SR 58 – Barstow, Bakersfield	Interchange; eastern terminus; SR 58 exit 172; former US 466 east
	8.9	14.3	Altus Avenue	Continuation beyond SR 58
1.000 mi = 1.609 km; 1.000 km = 0.621 mi: Concurrency terminus

=== Boron ===
State Route 58 Business
- Location: Boron–Kramer Junction

State Route 58 Business (SR 58 Bus.) is a business route of California State Route 58 that runs between Boron and Kramer Junction. It provides access to downtown Boron as Twenty Mule Team Road. It also follows the former routing of U.S. Route 466. It is signed from SR 58 at Borax Road to the old SR 58 split near the Kern–San Bernardino county line (where the old SR 58 now dead ends following the 2020 completion of the freeway bypass in Kramer Junction). From here to US 395 in Kramer Junction, following the old alignment of SR 58 (and US 466), the business route is unsigned.

Major intersections

County	Location	mi	km	Destinations	Notes
Kern	Boron	0.00	0.00	Borax Road north	Continuation beyond SR 58
Kern	Boron	0.00	0.00	SR 58 – Bakersfield, Barstow	Interchange; western terminus; SR 58 exit 196
San Bernardino	Kramer Junction	9.7	15.6	US 395 south – San Bernardino	West end of US 395 overlap
San Bernardino	Kramer Junction	10.1	16.3	SR 58 – Barstow, Bakersfield	Interchange; eastern terminus; east end of US 395 overlap; SR 58 exit 206
San Bernardino	Kramer Junction	10.1	16.3	US 395 north – Bishop	Continuation beyond SR 58
1.000 mi = 1.609 km; 1.000 km = 0.621 mi: Concurrency terminus
