= Edison Field =

Edison Field may refer to:

- Edison Field (Anaheim), now Angel Stadium
- Edison Oil Field, Kern County, California
