= California State Route 202 =

Highway in California

State Route 202

- Map of Kern County in south central California with SR 202 highlighted in red

Route information
- Maintained by Caltrans
- Length: 10.53 mi (16.95 km)

Major junctions
- West end: California Correctional Institution
- East end: SR 58 near Tehachapi

Location
- Country: United States
- State: California
- Counties: Kern

Highway system
- State highways in California; Interstate; US; State; Scenic; History; Pre‑1964; Unconstructed; Deleted; Freeways
← SR 201	→ SR 203

State Route 202 (SR 202) is a state highway in the U.S. state of California that serves as a spur route from State Route 58 in Tehachapi in Kern County to the California Correctional Institution.

A portion of SR 202 is overlapped with SR 58 Business. That portion follows the alignment of decommissioned U.S. Route 466.

== Route description ==
Route 202 is defined in section 502 of the California Streets and Highways Code, and that the highway is "from California Correctional Institution at Tehachapi to Route 58 near Tehachapi".

SR 202 begins with its western terminus at the California Correctional Institution in Cummings Valley along West Valley Boulevard, its name for part of the route. SR 202 then heads eastward through a farmland area before entering a suburb area of Tehachapi. The road then abruptly turns north toward SR 58 Business where it is concurrent with the business route through town to its eastern end at State Route 58 with an interchange.

SR 202 is part of the National Highway System, a network of highways that are considered essential to the country's economy, defense, and mobility by the Federal Highway Administration.

== Major intersections ==
Except where prefixed with a letter, postmiles were measured on the road as it was in 1964, based on the alignment that existed at the time, and do not necessarily reflect current mileage. Postmile prefixes include: R reflecting a realignment in the route since then, M indicating a second realignment, L referring to an overlap due to a correction or change, and T indicating postmiles classified as temporary. Segments that remain unconstructed or have been relinquished to local control may be omitted. The entire route is in Kern County.

Location	Postmile	Destinations	Notes
	R1.48	California Correctional Institution main entrance	West end of SR 202
Golden Hills	7.30	Woodford Tehachapi Road	Former US 466 west
Tehachapi	R8.87	Tucker Road south, Valley Boulevard east	Former US 466 east / SR 202 east
Tehachapi	R9.38	SR 58 Bus. east (Tehachapi Boulevard) / Red Apple Avenue	West end of SR 58 Bus. overlap; former SR 202 west
	12.01	SR 58 – Barstow, Bakersfield	Interchange; east end of SR 58 Bus. overlap; east end of SR 202; SR 58 exit 148
1.000 mi = 1.609 km; 1.000 km = 0.621 mi: Concurrency terminus
