= California State Route 229 =

Highway in California

State Route 229

- Map of San Luis Obispo County in southern California with SR 229 highlighted in red

Route information
- Maintained by Caltrans
- Length: 9.160 mi (14.742 km)

Major junctions
- South end: SR 58 near Atascadero
- North end: SR 41 near Creston

Location
- Country: United States
- State: California
- County: San Luis Obispo

Highway system
- State highways in California; Interstate; US; State; Scenic; History; Pre‑1964; Unconstructed; Deleted; Freeways
← SR 228	→ SR 230

State Route 229 (SR 229) is a state highway in the U.S. state of California, running in San Luis Obispo County from State Route 58 to State Route 41. It connects the small community of Creston with the rural state routes. Also, in conjunction with SR 58 and SR 41, it provides a slower, more scenic route between the Central Coast and the San Joaquin Valley.

== Route description ==
Route 229 is defined in section 529 of the California Streets and Highways Code, and that the highway is "from Route 58 near Santa Margarita to Route 41 near Creston".

SR 229 starts at SR 58 east of Santa Margarita. It travels north on Webster Road as a one-lane, windy mountain road, after which the road widens to two lanes as it approaches Rocky Canyon Road. In this segment, it is a county road much like a standard rural state route. It continues north through relatively flat, rural farmland and then passes through the small town of Creston, continuing north and terminating at SR 41.

SR 229 is not part of the National Highway System, a network of highways that are considered essential to the country's economy, defense, and mobility by the Federal Highway Administration.

== History ==
SR 229 was adopted as a state route in 1933 as Legislative Route 137. It was an unsigned highway running from LRN 2 (currently US 101) near Santa Margarita to LRN 125 (formally US 466, currently SR 41). Its original purpose was to provide an alternate route between US 101 (the major north-south route on the Central Coast) to US 466 (a major route connecting the Central Coast to the San Joaquin Valley). In the 1950s, US 466 was moved to LRN 33 (currently SR 46). The original alignment became unsigned. In 1957, LRN 137 was changed to start at LRN 58 (currently SR 58) instead of LRN 2. This isolated the route between two rural routes. In 1964, with the renumbering of California state routes, LRN 137 became SR 229 and became a signed route. It has changed little since that time.

== Major intersections ==
Except where prefixed with a letter, postmiles were measured on the road as it was in 1964, based on the alignment that existed at the time, and do not necessarily reflect current mileage. Postmile prefixes include: R reflecting a realignment in the route since then, M indicating a second realignment, L referring to an overlap due to a correction or change, and T indicating postmiles classified as temporary. Segments that remain unconstructed or have been relinquished to local control may be omitted. The entire route is in San Luis Obispo County.

Location	Postmile	Destinations	Notes
	0.00	SR 58 – McKittrick, Santa Margarita	South end of SR 229
	9.16	SR 41 – Atascadero, Paso Robles, Shandon	Former US 466; north end of SR 229
1.000 mi = 1.609 km; 1.000 km = 0.621 mi
