= West Bakersfield Interchange =

Freeway interchange in Bakersfield, California

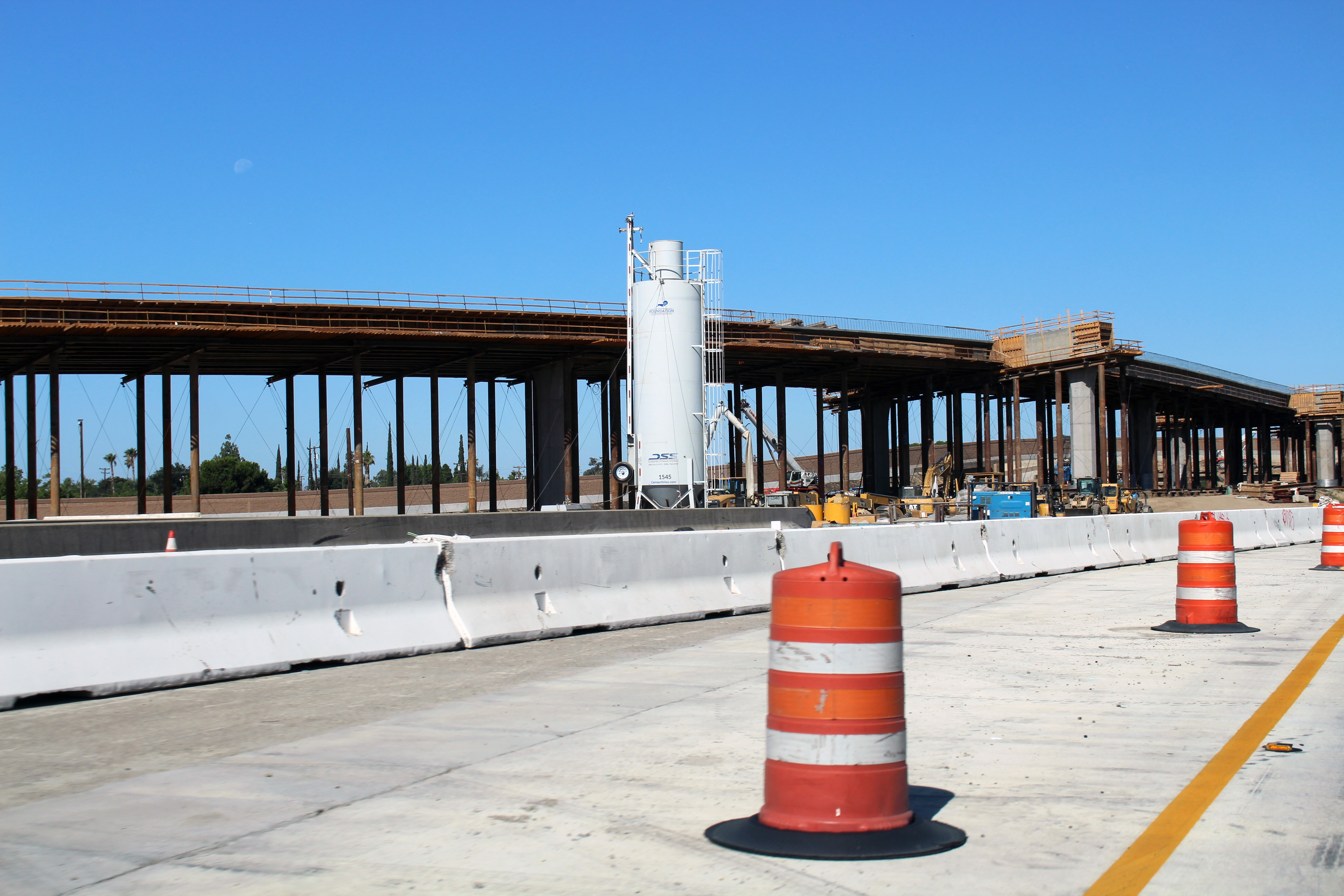
- The ramp from northbound SR 99 to westbound SR 58 under construction, June 2022

Location
- Bakersfield, California
- Coordinates: 35°21′10″N 119°2′22″W
- Roads at junction: SR 58 (Mojave Freeway); SR 99 (Golden State Freeway)

Construction
- Type: Three level stack interchange
- Spans: 5
- Lanes: 4 (Mojave Freeway), 8 (Golden State Freeway)
- Constructed: 1974–76, 2017–24
- Opened: 1976
- Maintained by: Caltrans

The West Bakersfield Interchange is a freeway interchange in Bakersfield, California, west of downtown. It connects State Route 99 (Golden State Freeway) with SR 58 (Mojave Freeway). These routes represent the heart of the Bakersfield freeway network. They connect the city with commercial centers in the San Joaquin Valley, ports in Los Angeles, and major Interstate freeways serving southern and eastern America.

The original interchange plan was more elaborate. Five freeway segments (three signed routes) would connect through a series of three interchanges, forming a triangle. Those routes were SR 99 (Golden State Freeway), SR 58 (Mojave Freeway/Westside Parkway), and SR 178 (Crosstown Freeway). However, only four segments and part of one interchange were constructed. Today, SR 178 terminates about 1.5 miles (2.4 km) east of the interchange.

Since the interchange was designed relatively late compared to other major California freeway interchanges, several design elements were incorporated to help alleviate traffic. Unlike the East Los Angeles and Orange Crush interchanges, the three Kern County interchanges are widely spaced (between 1 and 2 miles (1.6 and 3.2 km)) from one another. Also, local interchanges within one mile (1.6 km) of it transition onto their own parallel roads, and merge with the mainline after the main interchange.

== History ==
The western extension as well as the northern leg of the interchange were not constructed. It was delayed first by a four-year freeway construction moratorium imposed by Governor Jerry Brown (1977–81) and was followed by 25 years of opposition from the City of Bakersfield (1980–2005).

In 2005, federal money was secured for the construction of several projects in the Bakersfield area, including construction of the southern leg of the interchange, connecting the Mojave Freeway to the Westside Parkway. This would also complete construction of the existing interchange, and provide improvements which will be incorporated into the future construction of the other two interchanges. The city would also drop its opposition to the project, with the city council voting to give Caltrans full control over it. The city would retain control over the construction of the Westside Parkway.

In 2005, $330 million was secured through the Safe, Accountable, Flexible, Efficient Transportation Equity Act: A Legacy for Users (SAFETEA-LU) for the construction of the Centennial Corridor. The southern leg of the interchange is a part of Phase 3 of that project. However, the project was controversial since it displaced dozens of homes and businesses.

The project was partially completed in October 2022, but did not include ramps for southbound SR 99 traffic to directly transition to westbound SR 58, or eastbound SR 58 traffic to transition to northbound SR 99. The connection to SR 99 and the whole interchange was originally scheduled to be completed in fall 2023, with the rest of SR 58 running on Rosedale Highway between Mohawk Street and SR 99 being transferred onto the completed connector. The Centennial Corridor was inaugurated on February 9, 2024, with a ceremonial bicycle ride, and officially opened to traffic on February 17, 2024. The project was originally scheduled to open in late 2023 but faced significant delays.

== See also ==
- Transportation in Kern County, California
