= California State Route 184 =

Highway in California

State Route 184
- Weedpatch Highway
- SR 184 highlighted in red

Route information
- Maintained by Caltrans
- Length: 14.139 mi (22.755 km)
- Existed: 1964–present

Major junctions
- South end: SR 223 near Weedpatch
- SR 58 near Bakersfield
- North end: SR 178 in Bakersfield

Location
- Country: United States
- State: California
- Counties: Kern

Highway system
- State highways in California; Interstate; US; State; Scenic; History; Pre‑1964; Unconstructed; Deleted; Freeways
← SR 183	→ SR 185

State Route 184 (SR 184), locally known as Weedpatch Highway, is a state highway in the U.S. state of California. Located in Kern County, it runs from the intersection of SR 223 (Bear Mountain Boulevard) and Wheeler Ridge Road near Arvin north to SR 178 in Bakersfield. It is mainly a 2-lane conventional highway, expanding to four lanes in Lamont and Bakersfield. The highway serves local agricultural land south of Bakersfield.

== Route description ==
Route 184 is defined in section 484, subsection (a) of the California Streets and Highways Code, and that the highway is "from Route 223 near Weedpatch to Route 178". Subdivision (b) permits the state to relinquish control of the segment of the highway between Route 58 and Route 178 within unincorporated Kern County and the City of Bakersfield to local control.

SR 184 starts at a roundabout at SR 223 (Bear Mountain Boulevard) and Wheeler Ridge Road. The latter is a county road that, although not a truck route, is the only north/south road south of Bakersfield that directly connects to I-5. SR 223 provides a connection from I-5 to Arvin.

SR 184 then travels north, through relatively flat agricultural land. It crosses through the towns of Weedpatch, and Lamont. The highway continues north, and crosses its major junction with SR 58, a major east/west freeway that connects the San Joaquin Valley to all points southeast. At the junction, the road’s name changes to Morning Drive. It then enters the rural, but growing, eastern portion of Bakersfield. At the intersection of Morning Drive and Niles Street/Kern Canyon Road, the route turns right onto Kern Canyon Road. The route turns northeast, as it travels through open grassland. It terminates at SR 178 (Kern Canyon Road) near the old Mesa Marin Raceway. SR 178 runs from Bakersfield to the Kern Valley region.

SR 184 is part of the California Freeway and Expressway System, and is part of the National Highway System, a network of highways that are considered essential to the country's economy, defense, and mobility by the Federal Highway Administration.

== History ==
SR 184 was adopted as a state route in 1933 as Legislative Route 143. It was an unsigned highway running from LRN 140 (current SR 223, Bear Mountain Boulevard), to LRN 57 (current SR 178, Kern Canyon Rd.). The route definition has changed little since that time. In 1964, during the renumbering of California routes, LRN 143 changed to SR 184, and became a signed route. In 1968, with the opening of SR 178 freeway in Bakersfield, SR 184 was extended northeast, along the old SR 178 alignment to a new connection just east of the old Mesa Marin Raceway. This was where the new alignment for SR 178 ended. This intersection was realigned in 2016 during a widening project, and the old two-way stop was replaced with a fully signalized intersection.

== Major intersections ==
Except where prefixed with a letter, postmiles were measured on the road as it was in 1964, based on the alignment that existed at the time, and do not necessarily reflect current mileage. Postmile prefixes include: R reflecting a realignment in the route since then, M indicating a second realignment, L referring to an overlap due to a correction or change, and T indicating postmiles classified as temporary. Segments that remain unconstructed or have been relinquished to local control may be omitted. The entire route is in Kern County.

Location	Postmile	Destinations	Notes
	L0.00	Wheeler Ridge Road – Los Angeles	Continuation beyond SR 223
	L0.00	SR 223 (Bear Mountain Boulevard) – Arvin	Roundabout; south end of SR 184
	7.94	SR 58	Interchange; SR 58 exit 117
	8.35	Edison Highway	Former US 466
	9.60	Niles Street, Morning Drive	
Bakersfield	12.14	SR 178 (Kern Canyon Road) – Bakersfield, Lake Isabella	North end of SR 184
1.000 mi = 1.609 km; 1.000 km = 0.621 mi
