= Weedpatch, California =

- Census-designated place
- Location in California and in Kern County

- Location in the United States
- Coordinates: 35°14′17″N 118°54′54″W
- Country: United States
- State: California
- County: Kern
- Established: "

Government
  - Senate: Melissa Hurtado (D)
  - Assembly: Jasmeet Bains (D)
  - U. S. Congress: David Valadao (R)

Area
  - Total: 3.561 sq mi (9.224 km^{2})
  - Land: 3.557 sq mi (9.212 km^{2})
  - Water: 0.0046 sq mi (0.012 km^{2}) 0.13%
- Elevation: 387 ft (118 m)

Population (2020)
  - Total: 2,206
  - Density: 620.2/sq mi (239.5/km^{2})
- ZIP code: 93241
- Area code: 661
- FIPS code: 06-83863

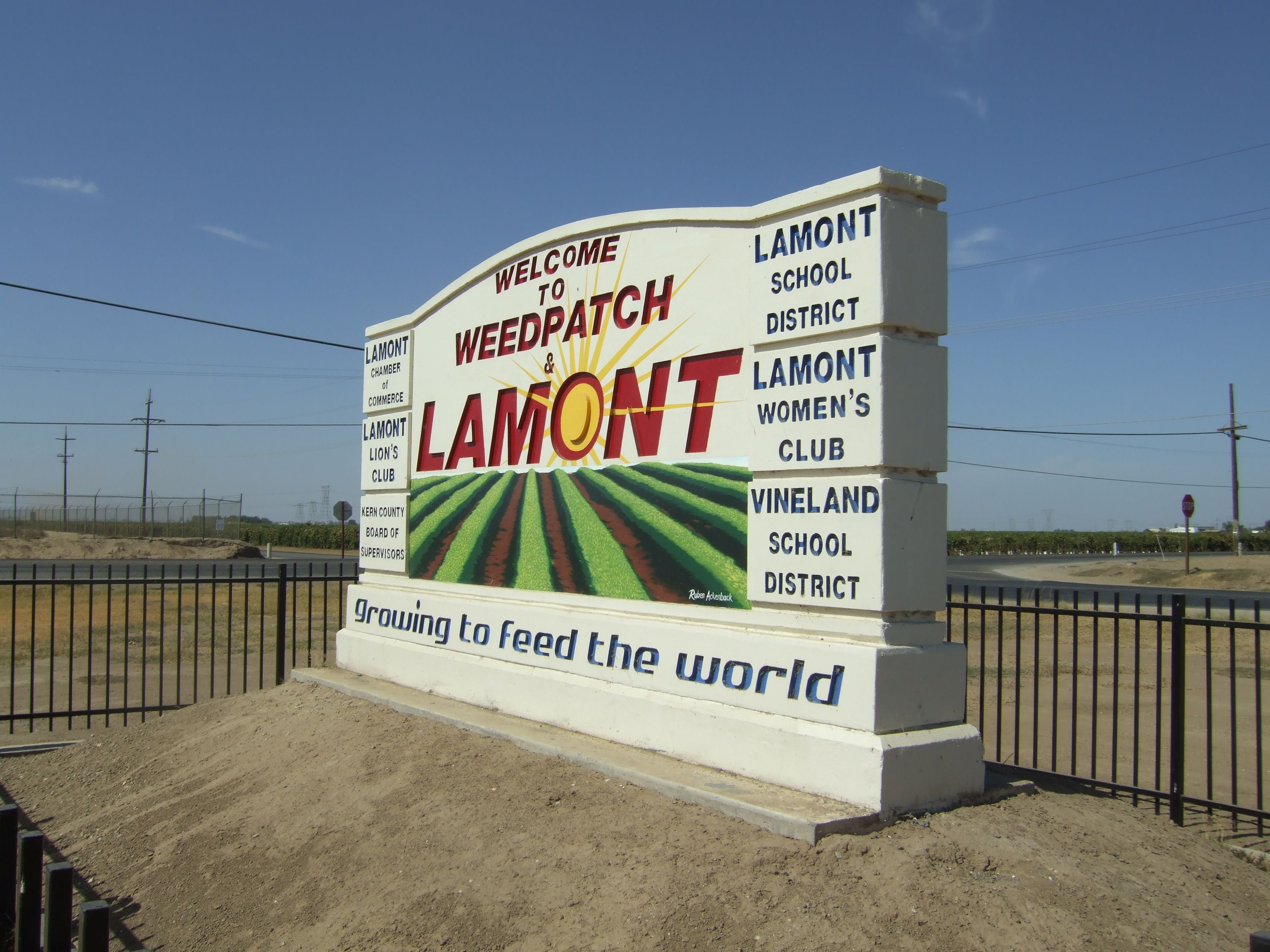
Welcome sign on California State Highway 184 for Weedpatch and the neighboring community of Lamont

Weedpatch (formerly Weed Patch and Alexander's Corner) is an unincorporated community and census-designated place (CDP) in Kern County, California, United States. Weedpatch is 10 miles (16 km) south-southeast of Bakersfield. It is considered to be one of the poorest areas in Kern County. As of the 2020 census it had a population of 2,206.

== Geography ==
The community, which lies at an elevation of 387 feet (118 m), is situated off State Route 184 (Weedpatch Highway) southeast of Bakersfield, south of Lamont and about 5 miles (8 km) south of State Route 58. It is at 35°14′17″N 118°54′54″W. According to the United States Census Bureau, Weedpatch has an area of 3.6 square miles (9.3 km^{2}).

== History ==
Although the name "Weed Patch" was applied to the site as early as 1874, the community began only in 1922. The town was also named "Alexander's Corner" in honor of Cal Alexander, a resident.

Weedpatch is the site of the Arvin Federal Government Camp, known colloquially (and in the John Steinbeck novel The Grapes of Wrath) as "Weedpatch Camp". This camp was a government rescue center for distressed migrant workers fleeing the Oklahoma Dust Bowl, during the Great Depression. The camp still aids migrant workers and is 1 mile (1.6 km) south of Weedpatch on Sunset just off Weedpatch Highway.

== Demographics ==
Historical population
Census	Pop.	Note	%±
1980	1,553		—
1990	1,892		21.8%
2000	2,726		44.1%
2010	2,658		−2.5%
2020	2,206		−17.0%
U.S. Decennial Census; 1860–1870 1880-1890; 1900 1910 1920; 1930 1940 1950; 1960 1970 1980; 1990 2000 2010; 2020

Weedpatch first appeared as a census designated place in the 1980 United States census.

=== Racial and ethnic composition ===
Weedpatch CDP, California – Racial and ethnic composition Note: the US Census treats Hispanic/Latino as an ethnic category. This table excludes Latinos from the racial categories and assigns them to a separate category. Hispanics/Latinos may be of any race.
Race / Ethnicity (NH = Non-Hispanic)	Pop 2000	Pop 2010	Pop 2020	% 2000	% 2010	% 2020
White alone (NH)	232	150	92	8.51%	5.64%	4.17%
Black or African American alone (NH)	2	1	2	0.07%	0.04%	0.09%
Native American or Alaska Native alone (NH)	18	3	3	0.66%	0.11%	0.14%
Asian alone (NH)	7	13	8	0.26%	0.49%	0.36%
Native Hawaiian or Pacific Islander alone (NH)	2	0	0	0.07%	0.00%	0.00%
Other race alone (NH)	5	1	4	0.18%	0.04%	0.18%
Mixed race or Multiracial (NH)	29	6	10	1.06%	0.23%	0.45%
Hispanic or Latino (any race)	2,431	2,484	2,087	89.18%	93.45%	94.61%
Total	2,726	2,658	2,206	100.00%	100.00%	100.00%

=== 2020 census ===
As of the 2020 census, Weedpatch had a population of 2,206. The population density was 620.2 inhabitants per square mile (239.5/km^{2}). The median age was 30.1 years; 32.2% of residents were under age 18, 11.2% were ages 18 to 24, 25.8% were ages 25 to 44, 21.4% were ages 45 to 64, and 9.4% were age 65 or older. For every 100 females, there were 95.7 males, and for every 100 females age 18 and over, there were 99.3 males age 18 and over.

There were 589 households, of which 55.0% had children under the age of 18 living in them. Of all households, 38.2% were married-couple households, 15.4% were cohabiting-couple households, 24.4% had a female householder with no partner present, and 21.9% had a male householder with no partner present. About 14.1% of all households were made up of individuals, and 4.4% had someone living alone who was age 65 or older. The average household size was 3.75, and there were 466 families (79.1% of all households).

There were 634 housing units at an average density of 178.2 units per square mile (68.8 units/km^{2}). Of these units, 589 (92.9%) were occupied and 45 (7.1%) were vacant; the homeowner vacancy rate was 1.8% and the rental vacancy rate was 1.3%. Of occupied units, 37.5% were owner-occupied and 62.5% were occupied by renters.

70.4% of residents lived in urban areas, while 29.6% lived in rural areas.

=== Income and poverty ===
In 2023, the US Census Bureau estimated that the median household income was $21,450, and the per capita income was $11,063. About 41.7% of families and 48.1% of the population were below the poverty line.

=== 2010 census ===
The 2010 United States census reported that Weedpatch had a population of 2,658, with a median household income of $28,075 and just above 45.8% living at or below the poverty level. It is considered to have a young population, with a median age of 22.7.

The racial makeup of Weedpatch was 1,212 (45.6%) white, 8 (0.3%) African American, 78 (2.9%) Native American, 14 (0.5%) Asian, 0 (0.0%) Pacific Islander, 1,237 (46.5%) from other races, and 109 (4.1%) from two or more races. Hispanic or Latino of any race were 2,484 persons (93.5%).

== Notable people ==
- Rachel Hollis, author
