= Edison Oil Field =

Oil field in Kern County, California

Coordinates: 35.3265°N 118.8611°W

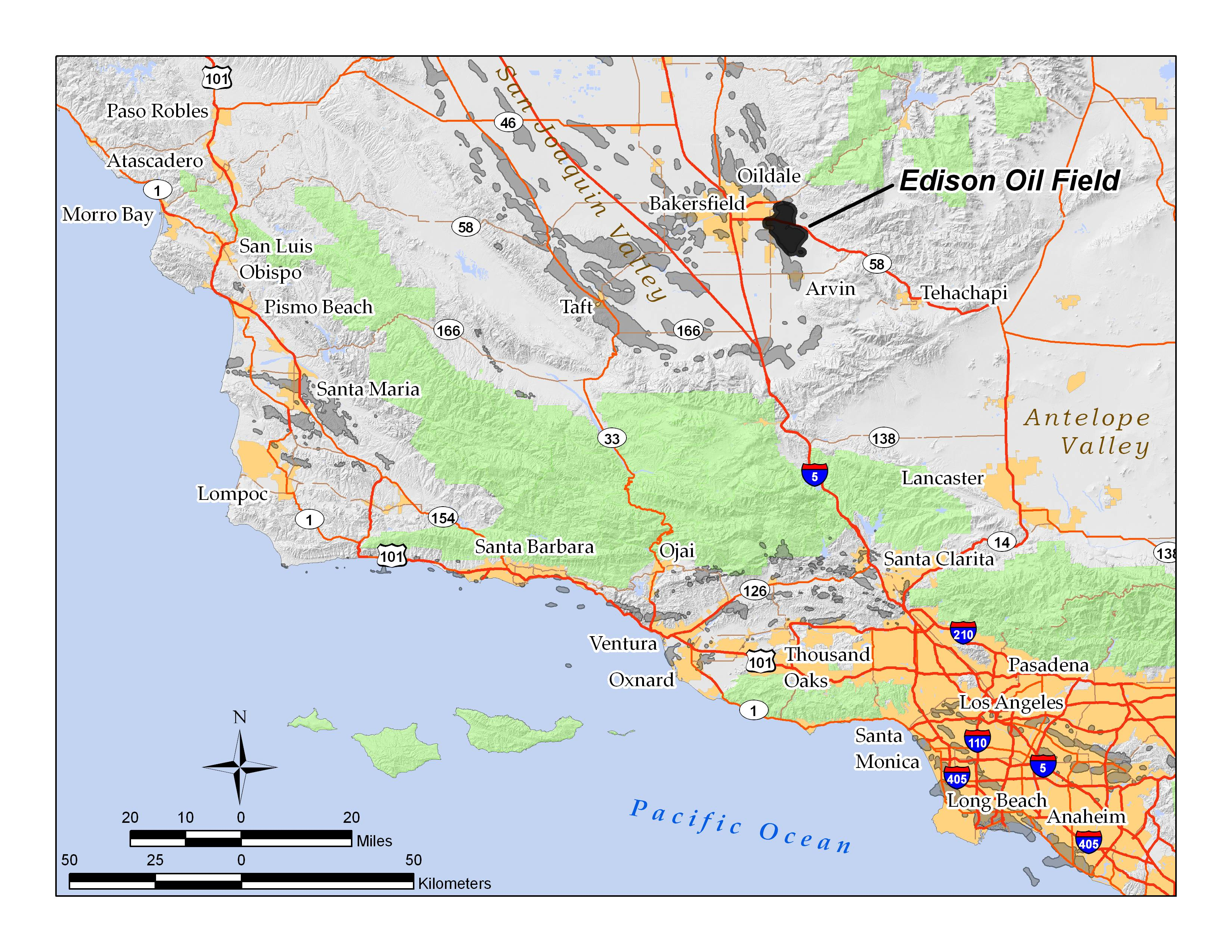
- The Edison Oil Field in the San Joaquin Valley of central California. Other oil fields are shown in light gray.
- Country: United States
- Region: San Joaquin Basin
- Location: Kern County, California
- Offshore/onshore: onshore
- Operators: Numerous ()

Field history
- Discovery: 1928
- Start of development: 1928
- Start of production: 1928
- Peak year: 1953

Production
- Current production of oil: 1,860 barrels per day (~92,700 t/a)
- Year of current production of oil: 2008
- Estimated oil in place: 6.221 million barrels (~8.487×10^{5} t)
- Producing formations: Walker (Oligocene), Santa Margarita (Miocene), Fruitvale (Miocene), Olcese (Miocene), Round Mountain (Miocene), Freeman-Jewett (Miocene), Chanac (Pliocene-Miocene), Kern River (Pleistocene); others

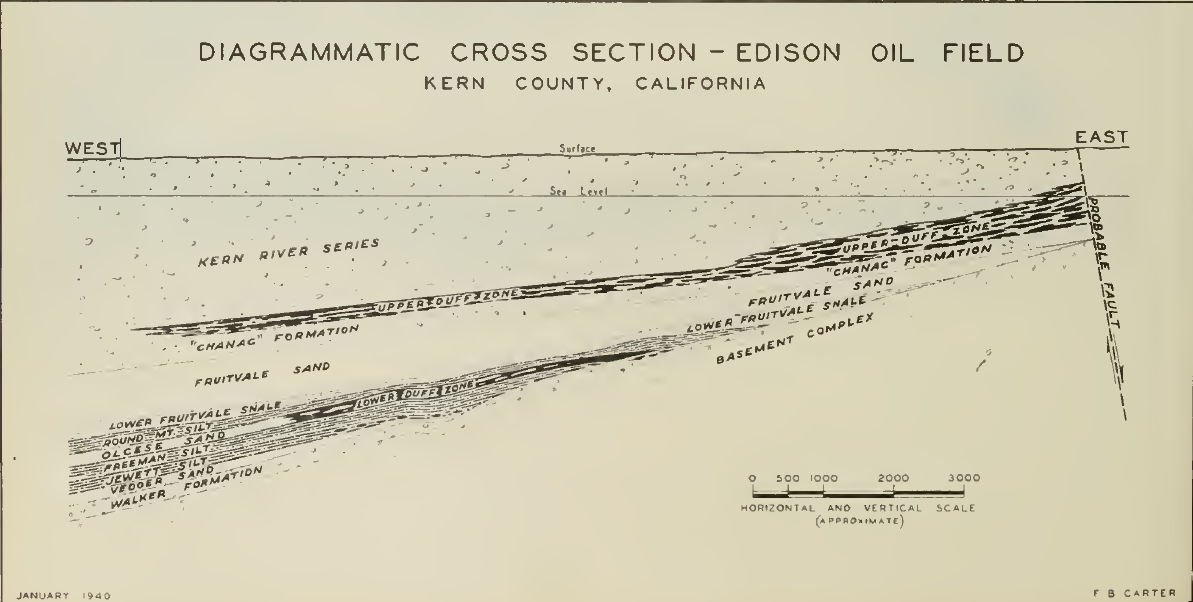
Edison Oil Field Geologic Cross Section

The Edison Oil Field is a large oil field in Kern County, California, in the United States, in the southeastern part of the San Joaquin Valley and adjacent foothills east-southeast of Bakersfield. The field has a total productive area of over 8,000 acres (32 km^{2}), most of which is intermingled with agricultural land uses; oil pumps and storage tanks are surrounded with row crops and orchards in much of the field's extent. Discovered in 1928, and with a cumulative production of 149 million barrels (23,700,000 m^{3}) of oil as of 2008, and having over 6 million barrels (950,000 m^{3}) in reserve, it is ranked 38th among California's oil fields by total ultimate recovery. It is a mature field in decline, and is run entirely by small independent operators. As of 2008, there were 40 different oil companies active on the field, one of the most in the state for a single field. 914 wells remained active on the field, averaging only two barrels of oil per well per day from the dwindling reservoirs.

== Setting ==
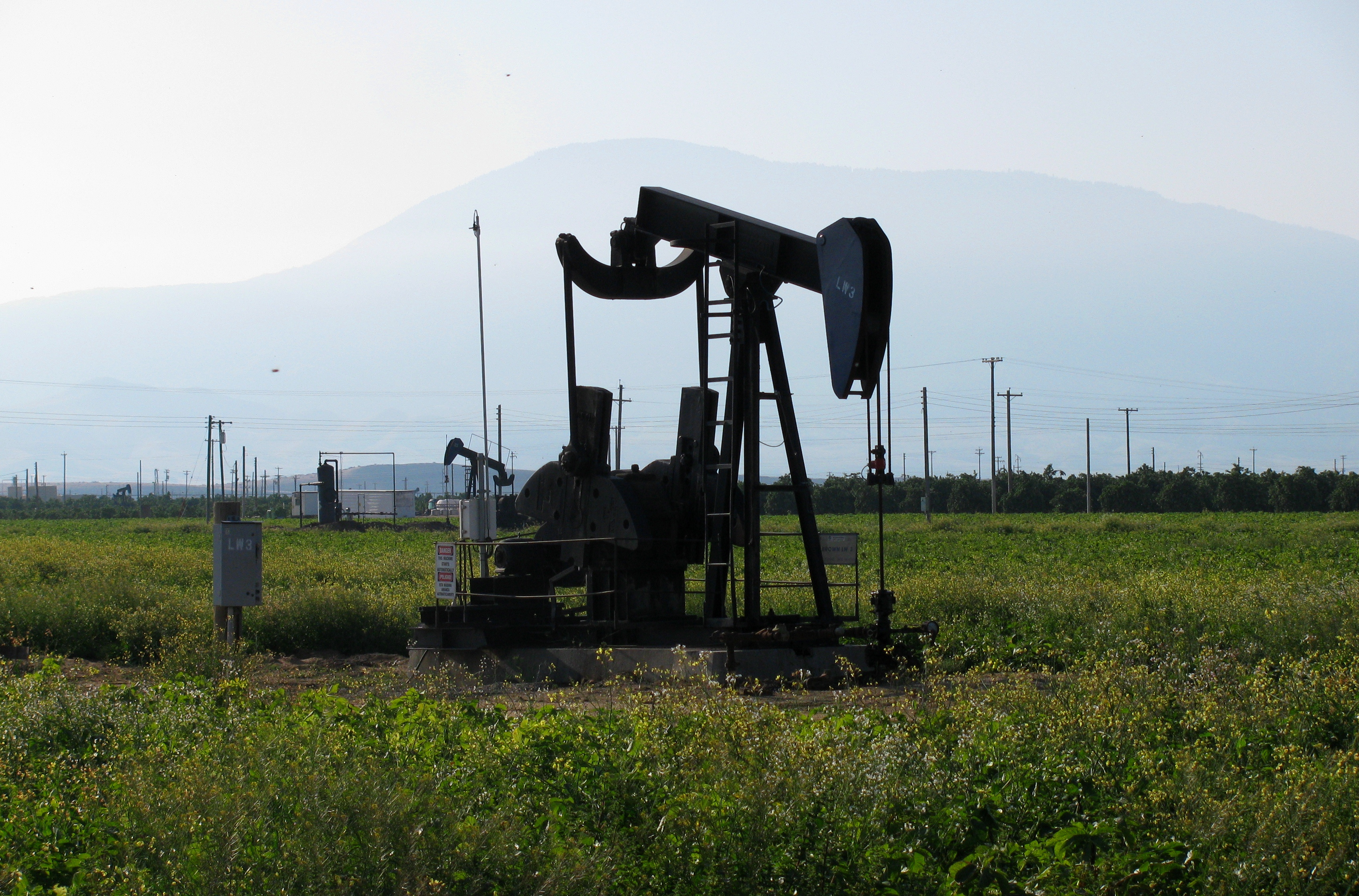
Oil well on the Edison field in an agricultural setting

The field lies in the flat bottomlands of the lower San Joaquin Valley, east-southeast of Bakersfield just outside the outlying residential areas. A small portion of the field – the Racetrack Hill area – extends into the lower foothills of the Sierra Nevada. The active portion of the field is approximately 9 miles (14 km) long north to south by 6 miles (10 km) across, with the most productive portions to the east and northeast. California State Route 58 crosses the field east to west, and California State Route 184, the Weedpatch Highway, runs north to south through the western part of the oil field.

Terrain in the vicinity of the oil field varies from almost table-flat, in the valley bottomlands, to rolling hills in the northeast, with elevations ranging from approximately 500 to 900 feet (150 to 270 m) above sea level throughout the productive region. The land rises with a slight gradient to the east and northeast, in the direction of the foothills of the southernmost Sierra Nevada. Climate is typical of the southern San Joaquin Valley, and is arid. Temperatures in the summer routinely exceed 100 °F (38 °C) on cloudless days. Rain falls mainly in the winter months, and averages 5 to 6 inches (130 to 150 mm) annually. Freezes occur occasionally during the winter, and the winter months are also subject to frequent dense tule fogs, limiting visibility to near zero. Drainage from the field is generally into the irrigation canal system, but because of the flat surface gradient most rainfall soaks directly into the ground. The air quality in the vicinity of the field, as recorded in the town of Arvin 2 miles (3 km) to the west, is among the worst in the United States.

== Geology ==
The Edison field, like the other fields in the bottomlands of the San Joaquin Valley, consists of a series of oil pools embedded in various types of traps within a thick section of Cenozoic sediments lying on top of ancient metamorphic basement rocks of Jurassic age. These basement rocks, which in the vicinity of the Edison field are primarily green schist containing calcite seams, slope from northeast to southwest with a depth of 2,000 feet (610 m) in the northeast part of the field to 8,000 feet (2,400 m) in the southwest, a distance of about 5 miles (8 km). The basement complex has a weathered surface, from long exposure to the elements tens of millions of years ago, prior to its subsiding into the sea and being covered with the sediments that now contain oil. In places the overlying sedimentary layers buttress against steeper portions of the basement schist, which when fractured may itself be an oil reservoir for hydrocarbons seeping upward from those buttressing units.

The overlying sedimentary layers are a mix of Holocene, Pleistocene, and Pliocene continental deposits and Miocene marine deposits. Oil pools exist both as lenticular accumulations within the units, trapped by stratigraphy, and as pools in structural traps along fault lines. The overall dip of the units within the field is to the southwest.

Quality and characteristics of oil varies widely throughout the field, as would be expected given the widely dispersed nature of the reservoirs both in depth and lateral extent. Near the surface, some of the oil is heavy, with API gravity around 13, requiring steam injection in order to be efficiently produced. Some of the deeper pools contain light oil with gravity over 40.

The deepest well on the field was drilled by J. Ainslie Bell, reaching the Oligocene-age Vedder Formation at a total depth of 7,458 feet (2,273 m).

== History, production, and operations ==
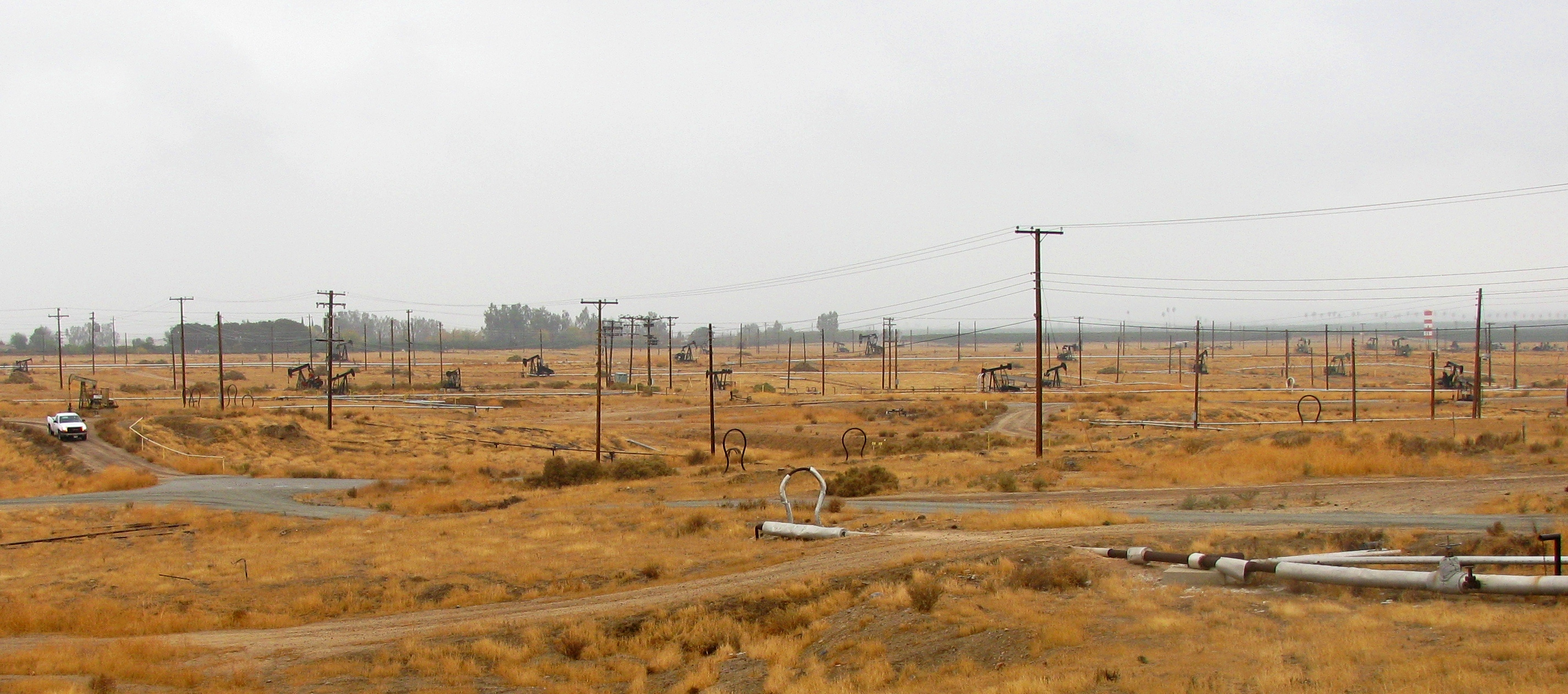
Racetrack Hill area of the Edison field, showing dispersed oil wells and steam pipes with expansion loops

The Edison field was one of the last fields discovered in California during the boom period of the early 20th century. Unlike other fields alongside the Central Valley which either advertise their existence with tar seeps or with anticlinal hills which serve as a surface expression for the underlying oil-bearing structures, the Edison field is completely hidden underneath the valley floor. The discovery well for the Edison field was drilled by General Petroleum Corporation in July 1928; it produced 65 barrels (10.3 m^{3}) of oil per day, an acceptable flow but no gusher; nevertheless it was sufficient to establish that an oil field lay below the flat farmland of the valley southeast of Bakersfield. Early well drilling in the area was almost always of a "wildcat" nature, with numerous failures, as finding oil-bearing units in the hidden structure was mostly guesswork, until enough borehole logs were available to begin to build a subsurface lithologic model.

During the 1920s the price of oil dropped gradually with new discoveries, including giant fields in the Los Angeles Basin, the Central Valley, and Texas; and with the Great Depression, and the 1930 discovery of the enormous East Texas field, the price of oil dropped as low as ten cents a barrel. Drilling during this period was greatly reduced, as the cost to open a new well was unlikely to be recouped unless an exceptional reservoir could be tapped, and few drillers were willing to take this risk, particularly in a field where success was so spotty. After the single well that opened the field's Main Area in 1932, no further wells were put into the Edison field until 1934, during which seven new wells became active, and in 1935 that number had risen to 46.

Over the next several decades, new reservoirs were discovered and put into production. In 1935, Shell Oil Company successfully completed their first well in the West Area of the field, which would prove to be one of the most productive areas. Also in 1935, the small 50-acre (200,000 m^{2}) Northeast Edison field was discovered by Woodward Oil Company. The Racetrack Hill Area came online in 1944, the Jeppi Area in 1948, and in 1950 Richfield Oil Corporation, ancestor of ARCO and BP, found oil in the Edison Groves Area. The field reached its peak production in 1953, a time when oil was flowing from all of these areas: in that year over 6.6 million barrels (1,050,000 m^{3}) were produced.

In the early 1960s, in an effort to restore declining production, several enhanced recovery methods were employed. The first waterflooding operation began in 1963 in the Portals-Fairfax area, and in 1964 both waterflooding and cyclic steam were in use in several areas of the field, with the steam recovery being used on the heavy oil reservoirs such as Racetrack Hill, where a steam system is still in place.

The major oil companies, and companies that are ancestors of today's major oil companies, gradually left the field in the decades following 1950. J. Paul Getty, Standard Oil of California, Richfield Oil Corporation, Shell and Mobil all once had holdings on the Edison field. Smaller independents absorbed these holdings, and in 2009 there were 40 separate operators on the field. Some of the largest of these at the end of 2008 were Vaquero Energy, with 352 wells; Naftex Operating Company, with 163, and Sequoia Exploration, Inc. with 93.

At the end of 2008, 914 wells remained active on the field, with a field-wide average water cut of 92%. In spite of the declining reserves, some independent operators continue to explore for oil. For example, in 2011 Tri-Valley Corp expanded its operations on the Claflin Lease in the Racetrack Hill area, with intent to drill 22 new wells.
