= Edison, California =

Unincorporated community in California, United States

- Unincorporated community Census designated place
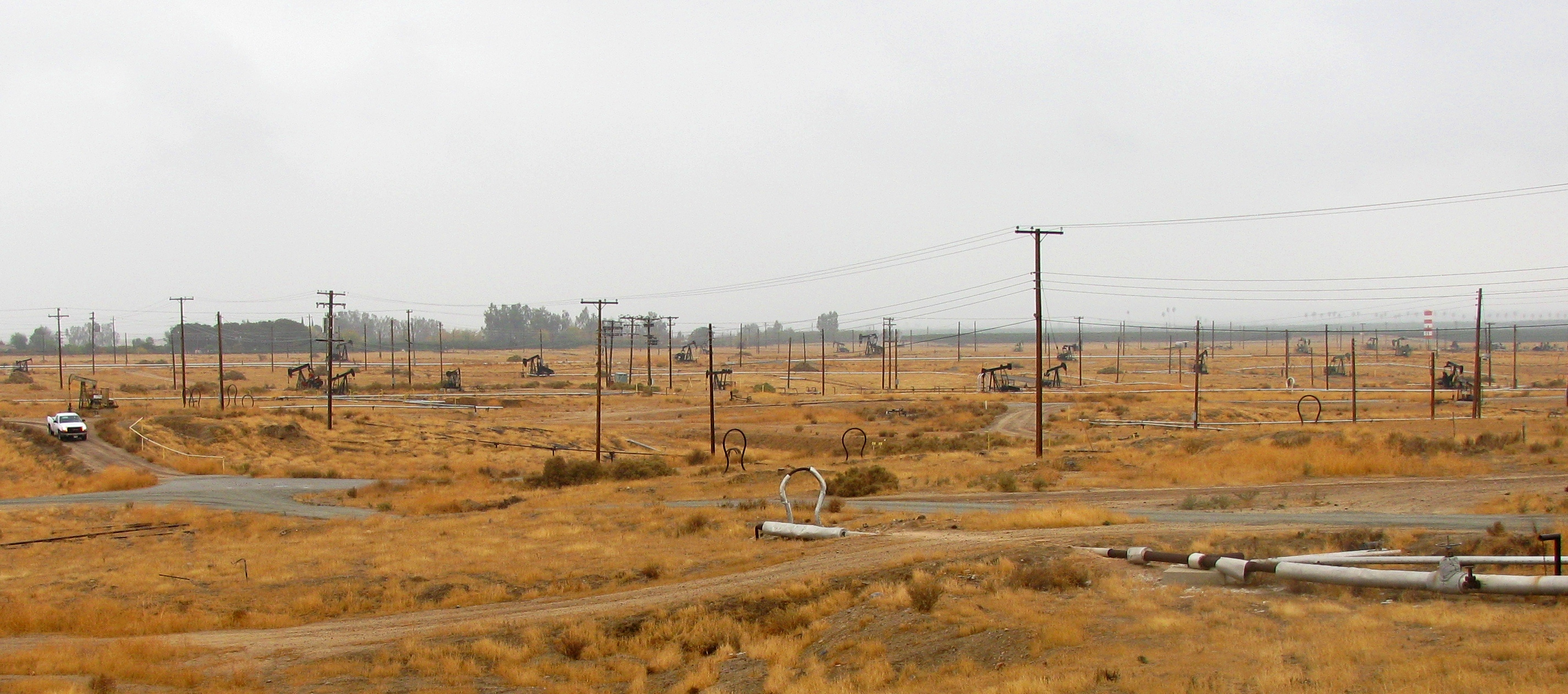
- Edison field, Racetrack Hill area, showing steam expansion loops and widely dispersed wells.

- Location in California Edison, California (the United States)
- Coordinates: 35°20′50.33″N 118°52′11.37″W
- Country: United States
- State: California
- County: Kern

Area
  - Total: 1.012 sq mi (2.62 km^{2})
  - Land: 1.012 sq mi (2.62 km^{2})
  - Water: 0 sq mi (0 km^{2})
- Elevation: 571 ft (174 m)

Population (2020)
  - Total: 255
  - Density: 252/sq mi (97.3/km^{2})
- Time zone: UTC-8 (Pacific)
  - Summer (DST): UTC-7 (PDT)
- ZIP code: 93307
- Area code: 661
- GNIS feature ID: 2804117

Edison (formerly Wade) is an unincorporated community and census designated place (CDP) in the Tehachapi mountains of Kern County, California, United States. It is located 7.5 miles (12 km) east-southeast of downtown Bakersfield, at an elevation of 571 feet (174 m). As of the 2020 census, Edison had a population of 255.

In 1902, the Edison Electric Company built a substation on the site. The Southern Pacific Railroad arrived at Wade in 1903, and changed the name to Edison. In 1928 oil was found nearby, and the Edison Oil Field gradually developed, peaking in the 1950s. The community is within the administrative boundaries of the oilfield, and active wells surround the town.

The Edison post office opened in 1903, closed in 1929, and re-opened in 1946.

== Demographics ==
Historical population
Census	Pop.	Note	%±
2020	255		—
U.S. Decennial Census; 1860–1870 1880-1890; 1900 1910 1920; 1930 1940 1950; 1960 1970 1980; 1990 2000 2010; 2020

Edison first appeared as a census designated place in the 2020 U.S. census.

=== 2020 Census ===
Edison CDP, California – Racial and ethnic composition Note: the US Census treats Hispanic/Latino as an ethnic category. This table excludes Latinos from the racial categories and assigns them to a separate category. Hispanics/Latinos may be of any race.
Race / Ethnicity (NH = Non-Hispanic)	Pop 2020	% 2020
White alone (NH)	82	32.16%
Black or African American alone (NH)	6	2.35%
Native American or Alaska Native alone (NH)	0	0.00%
Asian alone (NH)	3	1.18%
Native Hawaiian or Pacific Islander alone (NH)	0	0.00%
Other race alone (NH)	1	0.39%
Mixed race or Multiracial (NH)	6	2.35%
Hispanic or Latino (any race)	157	61.57%
Total	255	100.00%

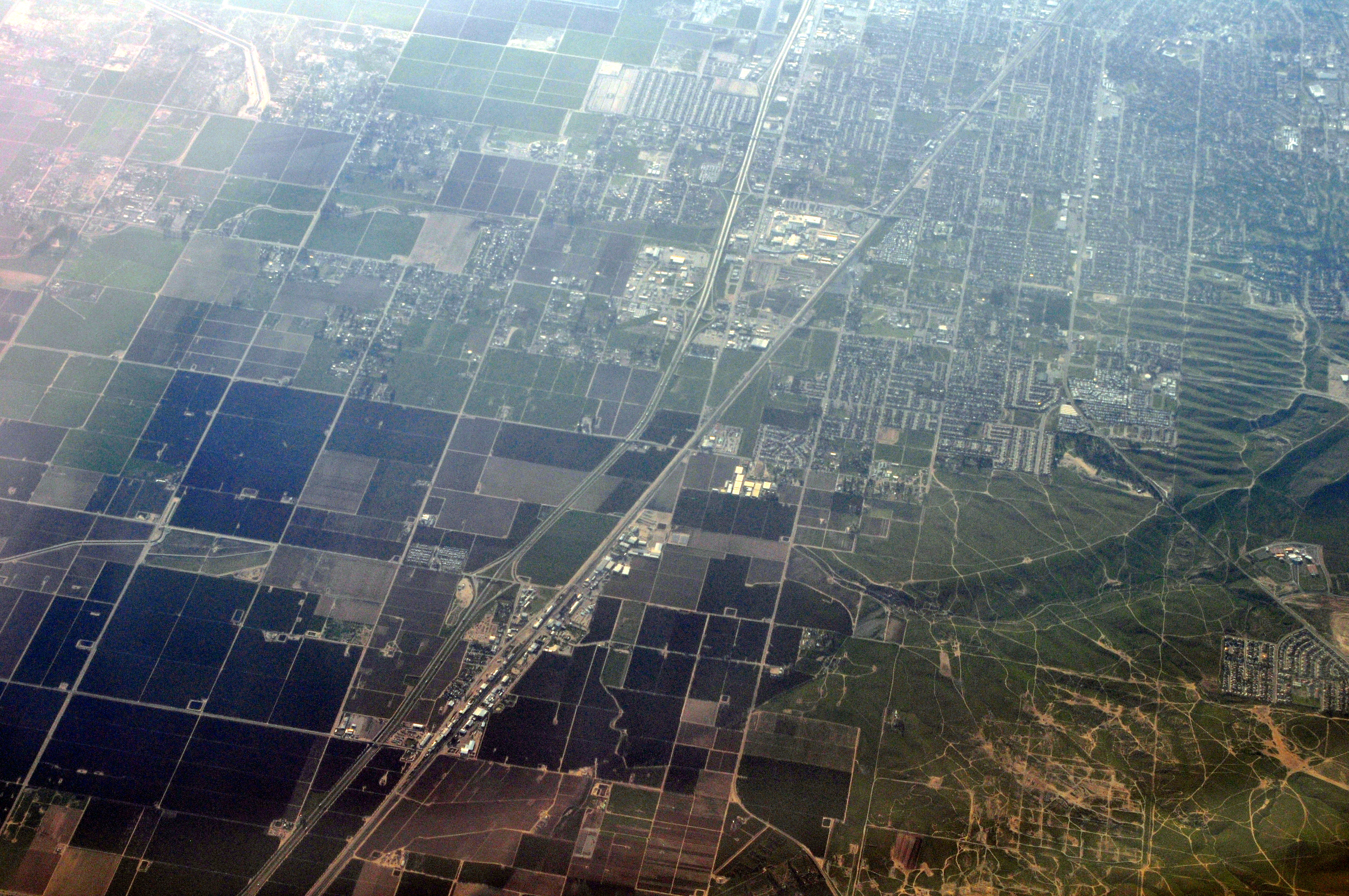
Aerial view of Edison from the east-northeast

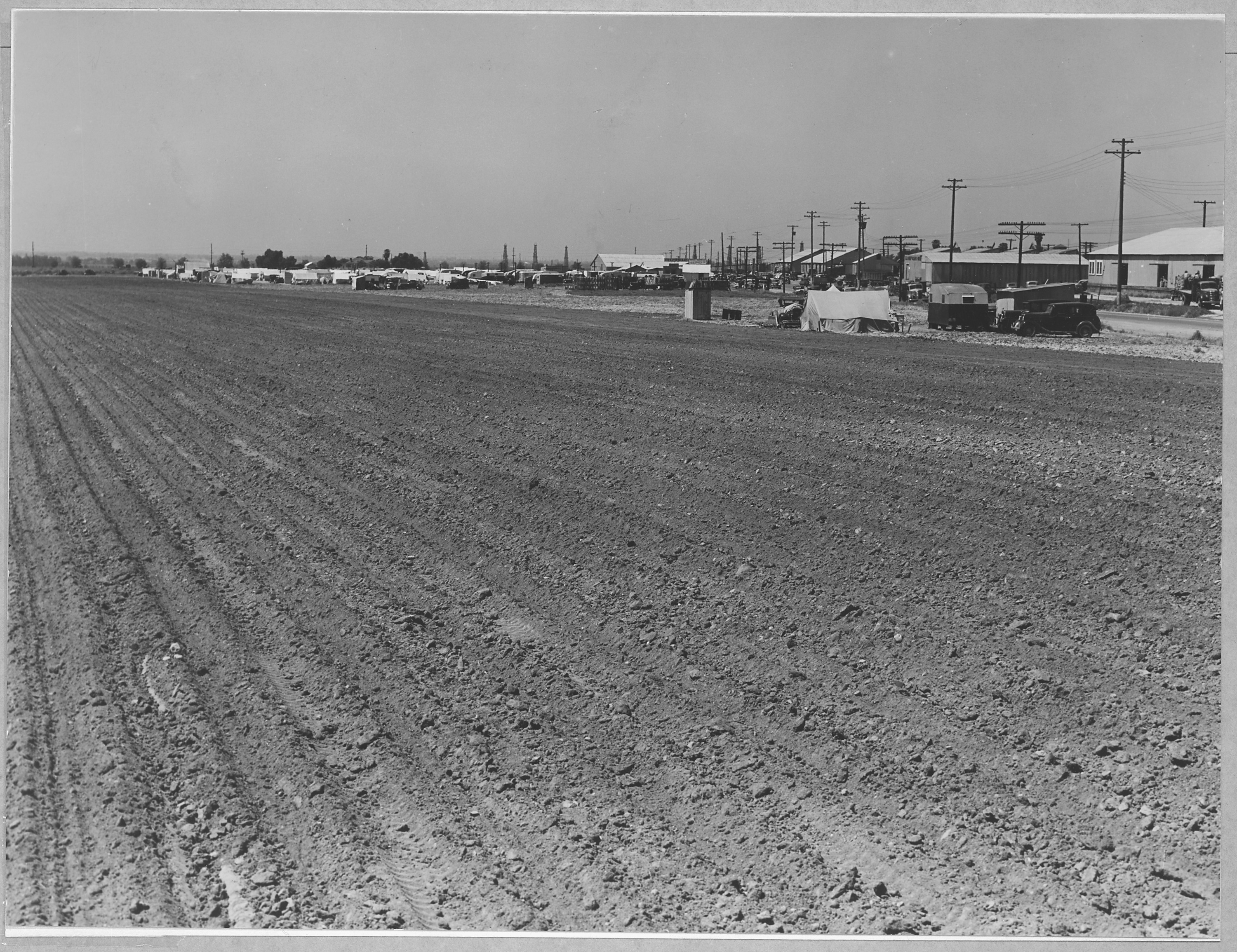
Potato farm in Edison, 1940
