= Rosedale, California =

Rosedale
- census-designated place
- Interactive map of Rosedale
- Location in the United States
- Coordinates: 35°23′01″N 119°08′43″W
- Country: United States
- State: California
- County: Kern

Government
  - Senate: Shannon Grove (R)
  - Assembly: Stan Ellis (R)
  - U. S. Congress: Vince Fong (R)

Area
  - Total: 29.272 sq mi (75.813 km^{2})
  - Land: 29.272 sq mi (75.813 km^{2})
  - Water: 0 sq mi (0 km^{2}) 0%
- Elevation: 364 ft (111 m)

Population (2020)
  - Total: 18,639
  - Density: 636.76/sq mi (245.85/km^{2})
- Time zone: UTC-8 (PST)
  - Summer (DST): UTC-7 (PDT)
- ZIP code: 93312, 93314
- Area code: 661
- FIPS code: 06-62854
- GNIS feature ID: 1652784

Rosedale is a census-designated place (CDP) in Kern County, California, United States. The population was 18,639 at the 2020 census, up from 14,058 at the 2010 census. Formerly a country town 10 miles (16 km) west of Bakersfield,

== Geography ==
Rosedale is located at 35°23′01″N 119°08′43″W.

According to the United States Census Bureau, the CDP has a total area of 29.3 square miles (76 km^{2}), all land.

== History ==
Rosedale was founded in 1891 as a colony of English farmers. A post office operated at Rosedale from 1891 to 1913.

== Demographics ==
Historical population
Census	Pop.	Note	%±
1990	4,673		—
2000	8,445		80.7%
2010	14,058		66.5%
2020	18,639		32.6%
U.S. Decennial Census; 1860–1870 1880-1890; 1900 1910 1920; 1930 1940 1950; 1960 1970 1980; 1990 2000 2010; 2020

Rosedale first appeared as a census designated place in the 1990 U.S. census.

=== Racial and ethnic composition ===
Rosedale CDP, California – Racial and ethnic composition Note: the US Census treats Hispanic/Latino as an ethnic category. This table excludes Latinos from the racial categories and assigns them to a separate category. Hispanics/Latinos may be of any race.
Race / Ethnicity (NH = Non-Hispanic)	Pop 2000	Pop 2010	Pop 2020	% 2000	% 2010	% 2020
White alone (NH)	7,036	10,491	12,015	83.32%	74.63%	64.46%
Black or African American alone (NH)	94	186	325	1.11%	1.32%	1.74%
Native American or Alaska Native alone (NH)	90	100	145	1.07%	0.71%	0.78%
Asian alone (NH)	109	373	691	1.29%	2.65%	3.71%
Native Hawaiian or Pacific Islander alone (NH)	3	15	13	0.04%	0.11%	0.07%
Other race alone (NH)	16	29	113	0.19%	0.21%	0.61%
Mixed race or Multiracial (NH)	168	369	912	1.99%	2.62%	4.89%
Hispanic or Latino (any race)	929	2,495	4,425	11.00%	17.75%	23.74%
Total	8,445	14,058	18,639	100.00%	100.00%	100.00%

=== 2020 census ===
As of the 2020 census, Rosedale had a population of 18,639 and a population density of 636.8 inhabitants per square mile (245.9/km^{2}).

The age distribution was 27.2% under 18, 8.2% aged 18 to 24, 23.6% aged 25 to 44, 27.4% aged 45 to 64, and 13.6% aged 65 or older; the median age was 38.3 years. For every 100 females there were 100.0 males, and for every 100 females age 18 and over there were 99.7 males age 18 and over.

The census reported that 99.9% of the population lived in households, 0.1% lived in non-institutionalized group quarters, and no one was institutionalized.

There were 5,859 households, of which 42.1% had children under 18, 73.5% were married-couple households, 3.9% were cohabiting couple households, 10.4% had a male householder with no spouse or partner present, and 12.2% had a female householder with no spouse or partner present. About 10.4% were one person, and 4.9% had someone living alone who was 65 or older; the average household size was 3.18. There were 5,062 families (86.4% of all households).

There were 6,069 housing units at an average density of 207.3 units per square mile (80.0 units/km^{2}), of which 3.5% were vacant; 96.5% were occupied, including 91.5% that were owner-occupied and 8.5% occupied by renters. The homeowner vacancy rate was 1.0% and the rental vacancy rate was 12.3%.

According to the census, 93.2% of residents lived in urban areas and 6.8% lived in rural areas.

=== 2010 census ===
At the 2010 census Rosedale had a population of 14,058. The population density was 413.9 inhabitants per square mile (159.8/km^{2}). The racial makeup of Rosedale was 11,695 (83.2%) White, 208 (1.5%) African American, 159 (1.1%) Native American, 389 (2.8%) Asian, 24 (0.2%) Pacific Islander, 997 (7.1%) from other races, and 586 (4.2%) from two or more races. Hispanic or Latino of any race were 2,495 persons (17.7%).

The census reported that 14,049 people (99.9% of the population) lived in households, 9 (0.1%) lived in non-institutionalized group quarters, and no one was institutionalized.

There were 4,565 households, 1,941 (42.5%) had children under the age of 18 living in them, 3,386 (74.2%) were opposite-sex married couples living together, 290 (6.4%) had a female householder with no husband present, 208 (4.6%) had a male householder with no wife present. There were 171 (3.7%) unmarried opposite-sex partnerships, and 35 (0.8%) same-sex married couples or partnerships. 522 households (11.4%) were one person and 161 (3.5%) had someone living alone who was 65 or older. The average household size was 3.08. There were 3,884 families (85.1% of households); the average family size was 3.32.

The age distribution was 3,811 people (27.1%) under the age of 18, 1,223 people (8.7%) aged 18 to 24, 3,124 people (22.2%) aged 25 to 44, 4,642 people (33.0%) aged 45 to 64, and 1,258 people (8.9%) who were 65 or older. The median age was 40.1 years. For every 100 females, there were 99.0 males. For every 100 females age 18 and over, there were 97.4 males.

There were 4,799 housing units at an average density of 141.3 per square mile, of the occupied units 4,106 (89.9%) were owner-occupied and 459 (10.1%) were rented. The homeowner vacancy rate was 1.6%; the rental vacancy rate was 9.4%. 12,647 people (90.0% of the population) lived in owner-occupied housing units and 1,402 people (10.0%) lived in rental housing units.

=== 2023 American Community Survey ===
In 2023, the US Census Bureau estimated that 8.4% of the population were foreign-born. Of all people aged 5 or older, 84.6% spoke only English at home, 11.0% spoke Spanish, 1.3% spoke other Indo-European languages, 2.7% spoke Asian or Pacific Islander languages, and 0.4% spoke other languages. Of those aged 25 or older, 88.6% were high school graduates and 39.3% had a bachelor's degree.

The median household income in 2023 was $134,697, and the per capita income was $62,545. About 2.8% of families and 5.4% of the population were below the poverty line.
