= Creston, California =

Unincorporated community in California

Creston
- Unincorporated community Census-designated place
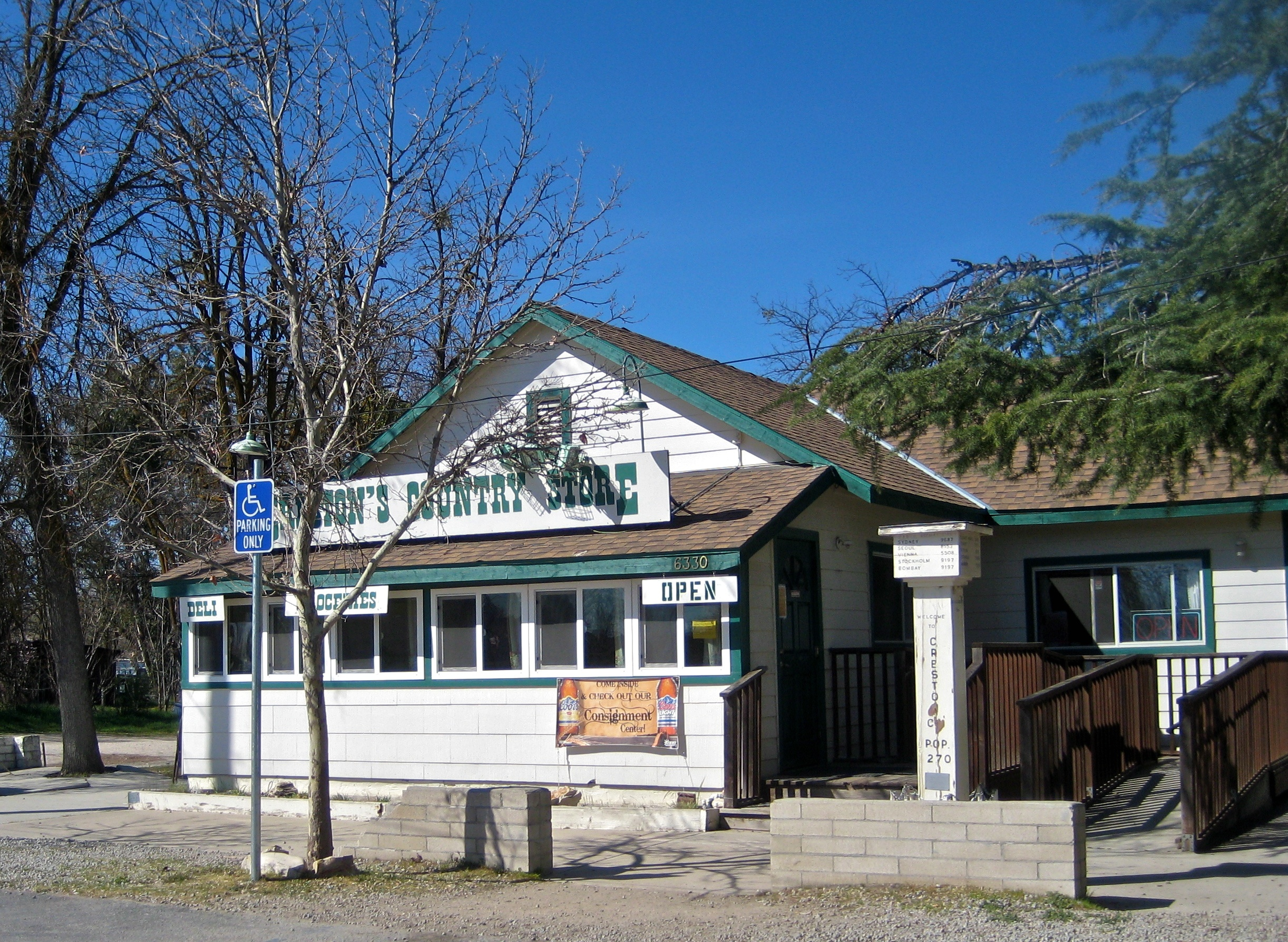
- Creston Country Store in 2012

- Location in San Luis Obispo County, California

- Location in California Creston (the United States)
- Coordinates: 35.517097°N 120.518136°W
- Country: United States
- State: California
- County: San Luis Obispo
- Founded: 1884
- Named for: C. J. Cressy

Area
  - Total: 0.569 sq mi (1.473 km^{2})
  - Land: 0.564 sq mi (1.460 km^{2})
  - Water: 0.0046 sq mi (0.012 km^{2}) 0.84%

Population (2020)
  - Total: 98
  - Density: 170/sq mi (67/km^{2})
- Time zone: UTC−08:00 (Pacific)
  - Summer (DST): UTC−07:00 (PDT)
- ZIP Code: 93432
- FIPS code: 06-17232
- GNIS feature ID: 2628724 (CDP)

Creston is an unincorporated community in San Luis Obispo County, California, United States. For statistical purposes, the United States Census Bureau has defined Creston as a census-designated place (CDP). It lies approximately 12 miles (19 km) east of Atascadero. The population was 98 at the 2020 census, compared with 94 in 2010.

Founded in 1884 on Rancho Huerhuero, the settlement was named for C. J. Cressy, one of its founders. Its historic buildings include the Creston Community Church, built in 1886. The community gives its name to the surrounding Creston District wine-growing region.

== History ==
=== Indigenous history ===
The Creston vicinity has an Indigenous history associated with the Northern Chumash and Salinan peoples. In their 2005 study of mission records and earlier ethnographic research, Randall Milliken and John R. Johnson identified Creston as a possible location of the village of Chmonimo. They concluded that Northern Chumash was probably spoken in the vicinity when Spanish colonization began, while noting uncertainty in the reconstruction of village locations.

The study traced the removal of Northern Chumash villagers from the inland region to Mission San Luis Obispo by the early nineteenth century. Salinan-speaking people from Mission San Miguel subsequently moved to mission outstations east of San Luis Obispo, probably beginning in the 1820s. These movements complicate efforts to reconstruct earlier language boundaries from later accounts.

=== Town development ===
Creston was founded in 1884 within the Mexican-era Rancho Huerhuero land grant. Originally called Huerhuero, the town became known as Creston in honor of Cressy. The name also came to identify the surrounding agricultural district: an 1890 county map used it for the wider region, and a 1913 county surveyor's map showed a Creston voting precinct.

The Creston school district was established in 1885. Several rural school districts combined in 1923 to form the Creston Elementary School District. The community church was built in 1886. The county's village plan describes it as the second Protestant church north of Cuesta Grade and identifies it as a county historical landmark designated by the county historical society.

A general store built by George Bell in the late nineteenth century supplied clothing, groceries, hardware, and agricultural equipment. The property later served as a residence and bar. Herman Heilman reopened it as a café, saloon, and grocery in 1973. After a fire in 1992 and subsequent redevelopment, the site became the Loading Chute restaurant, which opened in 2000.

=== Later history ===
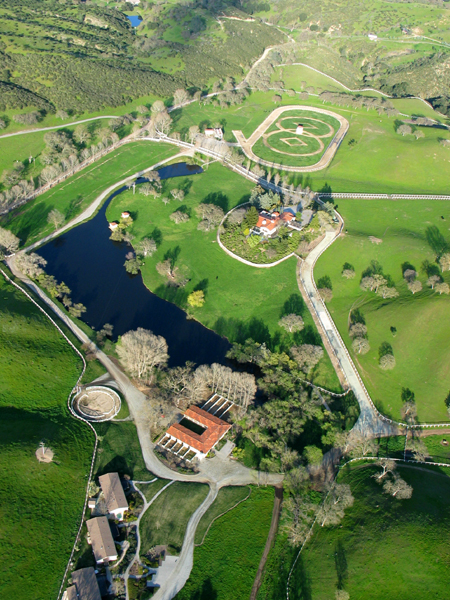
The ranch near Creston where L. Ron Hubbard spent his final years

Writer and Scientology founder L. Ron Hubbard moved to a ranch near Creston in 1983 and died there on January 24, 1986. The property later belonged to the Church of Spiritual Technology.

Horse breeder Fred Sahadi developed Cardiff Stud Farm near Creston in the mid-1980s, moving his breeding operation from the Santa Ynez Valley. Horses that stood at the Creston farm included Flying Paster and Skywalker. Cardiff later relocated to nearby Atascadero, and television host Alex Trebek bought the property from the family of trainer Jenine Sahadi in 1996 and renamed it Creston Farms, continuing to breed thoroughbreds there.

A meteorite fell at Creston on October 24, 2015. A 2019 study of its orbit and collisional history classified it as an L5/6 ordinary chondrite.

== Geography ==
Creston is in the county's El Pomar–Estrella planning subarea. According to the United States Census Bureau, the CDP covers 0.569 square miles (1.473 km^{2}), of which 0.564 square miles (1.460 km^{2}) is land and 0.0046 square miles (0.012 km^{2}) is water.

The surrounding Creston District lies among old river terraces and foothills of the La Panza Range. Huerhuero Creek drains northwest through the district toward the Salinas River. The district lies in the rain shadows of the La Panza and Santa Lucia ranges. The 2013 federal viticultural-area proposal reported an average annual precipitation of 11.5 inches (290 mm). It described daytime cooling from Pacific breezes passing through the Templeton Gap and nighttime drainage of cold air from the La Panza Range along Huerhuero Creek.

=== Climate ===
The nearest weather station with published climate normals is at Paso Robles, about 12 miles (19 km) northwest of Creston. Over the 1991–2020 period its average monthly high temperature ranged from 61.3 °F (16.3 °C) in December to 92.1 °F (33.4 °C) in August, and average annual precipitation was 15.26 inches (388 mm).

Climate data for Paso Robles, California, 1991–2020 normals
Month	Jan	Feb	Mar	Apr	May	Jun	Jul	Aug	Sep	Oct	Nov	Dec	Year
Mean daily maximum °F (°C)	61.9 (16.6)	63.8 (17.7)	68.1 (20.1)	73.0 (22.8)	79.5 (26.4)	86.6 (30.3)	90.5 (32.5)	92.1 (33.4)	89.2 (31.8)	80.6 (27.0)	69.3 (20.7)	61.3 (16.3)	76.3 (24.6)
Mean daily minimum °F (°C)	34.2 (1.2)	36.8 (2.7)	39.6 (4.2)	41.4 (5.2)	46.1 (7.8)	50.0 (10.0)	53.4 (11.9)	52.6 (11.4)	49.5 (9.7)	43.4 (6.3)	36.6 (2.6)	32.6 (0.3)	43.0 (6.1)
Average precipitation inches (mm)	3.44 (87)	3.24 (82)	2.84 (72)	0.81 (21)	0.36 (9.1)	0.04 (1.0)	0.10 (2.5)	0.02 (0.51)	0.08 (2.0)	0.66 (17)	1.16 (29)	2.51 (64)	15.26 (387.11)
Source: NOAA

== Demographics ==
Historical population
Census	Pop.	Note	%±
2010	94		—
2020	98		4.3%
U.S. census

=== 2010 ===
The 2010 United States census recorded 94 residents. The median age was 39.0 years. There were 22 people (23.4%) under 18, four (4.3%) aged 18–24, 28 (29.8%) aged 25–44, 27 (28.7%) aged 45–64, and 13 (13.8%) aged 65 or older. There were 80.8 males for every 100 females.

The census recorded 89 White residents (94.7%), two American Indian or Alaska Native residents (2.1%), one Asian resident (1.1%), and two residents of two or more races (2.1%). It recorded no Black, Native Hawaiian or other Pacific Islander residents, or residents reporting some other race alone. Six residents (6.4%) were Hispanic or Latino, of any race.

All residents lived in households; none lived in group quarters. The 36 households included 26 families. Twenty households were headed by a husband and wife, and three by a woman with no husband present. Eight households consisted of one person, including two people aged 65 or older. Average household size was 2.61, and average family size was 2.96.

There were 39 housing units, of which 36 were occupied. Twenty-seven occupied units (75.0%) were owner-occupied and nine (25.0%) were rented. The census reported both the homeowner and rental vacancy rates as zero.

=== 2020 ===
The 2020 United States census recorded 98 residents, with a median age of 28.8 years. Twenty-four residents (24.5%) were under 18, and five (5.1%) were 65 or older.

The census recorded 59 White residents (60.2%), one Asian resident (1.0%), two Native Hawaiian or other Pacific Islander residents (2.0%), 13 residents of some other race (13.3%), and 23 residents of two or more races (23.5%). It recorded no residents identifying as Black alone or American Indian or Alaska Native alone. Thirty-three residents (33.7%) were Hispanic or Latino, of any race.

There were 41 housing units, of which 33 were occupied and eight were vacant. Of the occupied units, 20 (60.6%) were owner-occupied and 13 (39.4%) were rented.

== Economy ==
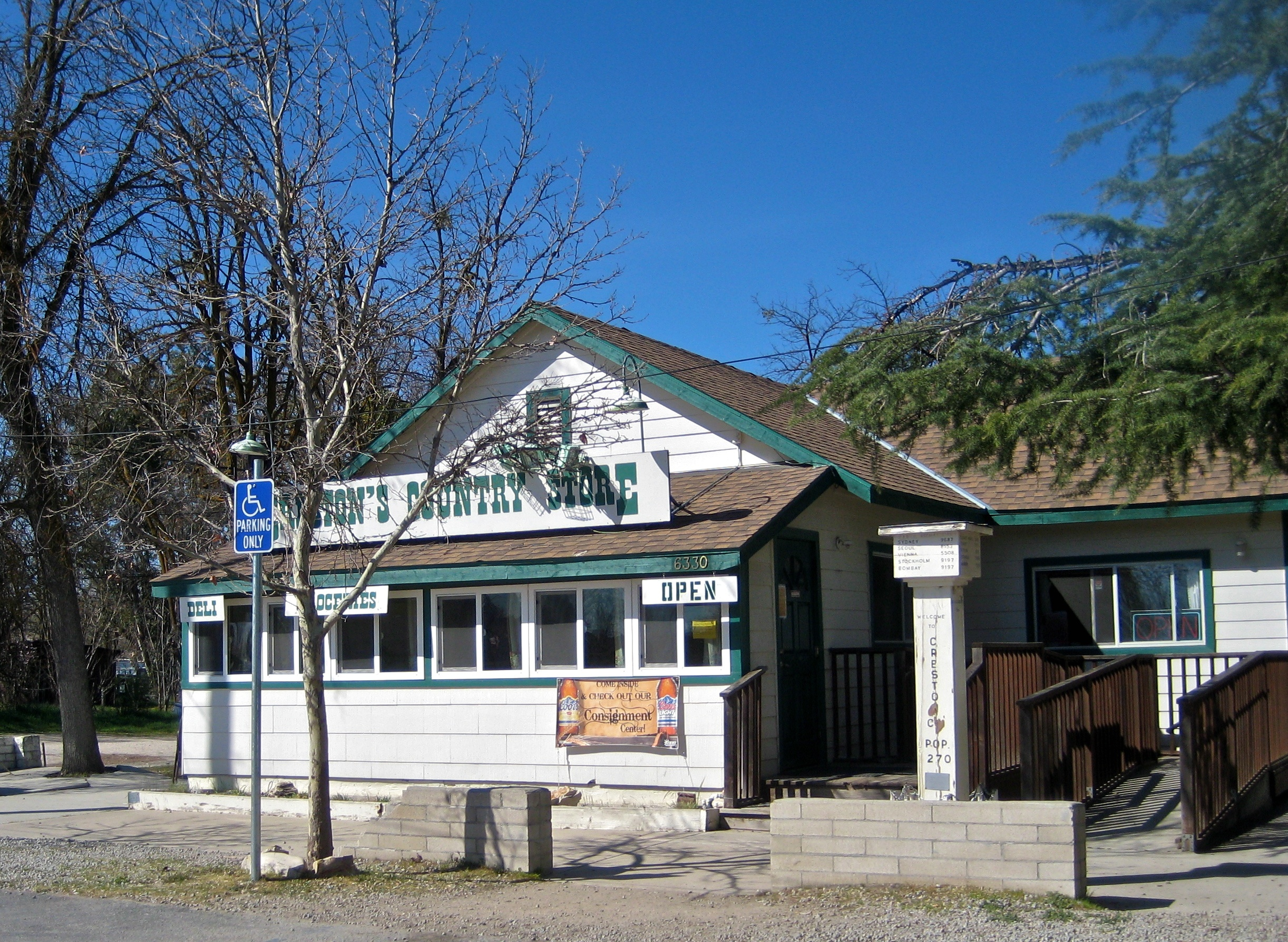
The Creston Country Store

The Alcohol and Tobacco Tax and Trade Bureau established the Creston District American Viticultural Area in 2014 as one of eleven subdivisions of the Paso Robles AVA. The designation took effect on November 10, 2014. The wine region encompasses approximately 47,000 acres (19,000 ha) around the community, rather than only the CDP. In the 2013 designation proposal, the bureau reported approximately 1,400 acres (570 ha) of vineyards within the proposed district.

== Arts and culture ==
The Longbranch Saloon in Creston

The Creston Classic Rodeo began in 1996 and is held in September. Run by volunteers, it raises money for community facilities and programs, including the community center and swimming pool. In 2025, the rodeo organization reported donations of $20,000 for improvements to the community center in the former fire station and $8,000 for the pool.

== Education ==
Creston Elementary School, part of the Atascadero Unified School District, serves kindergarten through fifth grade. The California Department of Education reported an enrollment of 67 for the 2025–26 school year.

== Infrastructure ==
State Route 229 and O'Donovan Road are the principal roads identified in the county's village circulation plan.
