= Kramer, California =

Unincorporated community in California, United States

Kramer
- Unincorporated community
- Location in California Kramer (the United States)
- Coordinates: 34°59′40″N 117°35′09″W
- Country: United States
- State: California
- County: San Bernardino
- Elevation: 2,497 ft (761 m)
- Time zone: UTC−8 (Pacific Time Zone)
  - Summer (DST): UTC−7 (PDT)
- Area codes: 442/760
- GNIS feature ID: 1666689

Kramer, also known as Kramer Junction, is an unincorporated community in San Bernardino County, California, United States. Kramer is located at the junction of US Highway 395 and California State Route 58 3.6 miles (5.8 km) east of Boron.

== History ==
The community of Kramer is said to have gotten their name in 1882 after Moritz Kramer, a native of Germany who would settle in the area in 1879. The area would later gain traction in the 1920's when settlers George Edwin "Ed" and John Herkelrath would find gold in the area, which would result in a mining boom and would be home to many settlers, who would build a store, a library, and several hundred mining claims. By 1931 however, much of the settlers would leave and would see a decline.

For many years, motorists have been frustrated at the long delays at the Kramer Junction stoplight, which interrupted the flow of traffic on CA-58. This issue was largely resolved by June 2020 with completion of the Kramer Junction bypass.

== Geography ==
Although the community is located in San Bernardino County, much of the community is adjacent to eastern Kern County, California. The area is also close to the Edwards Air Force Base in nearby Kern County.
