= Monolith, California =

Unincorporated community in California, United States

Monolith
- Unincorporated community
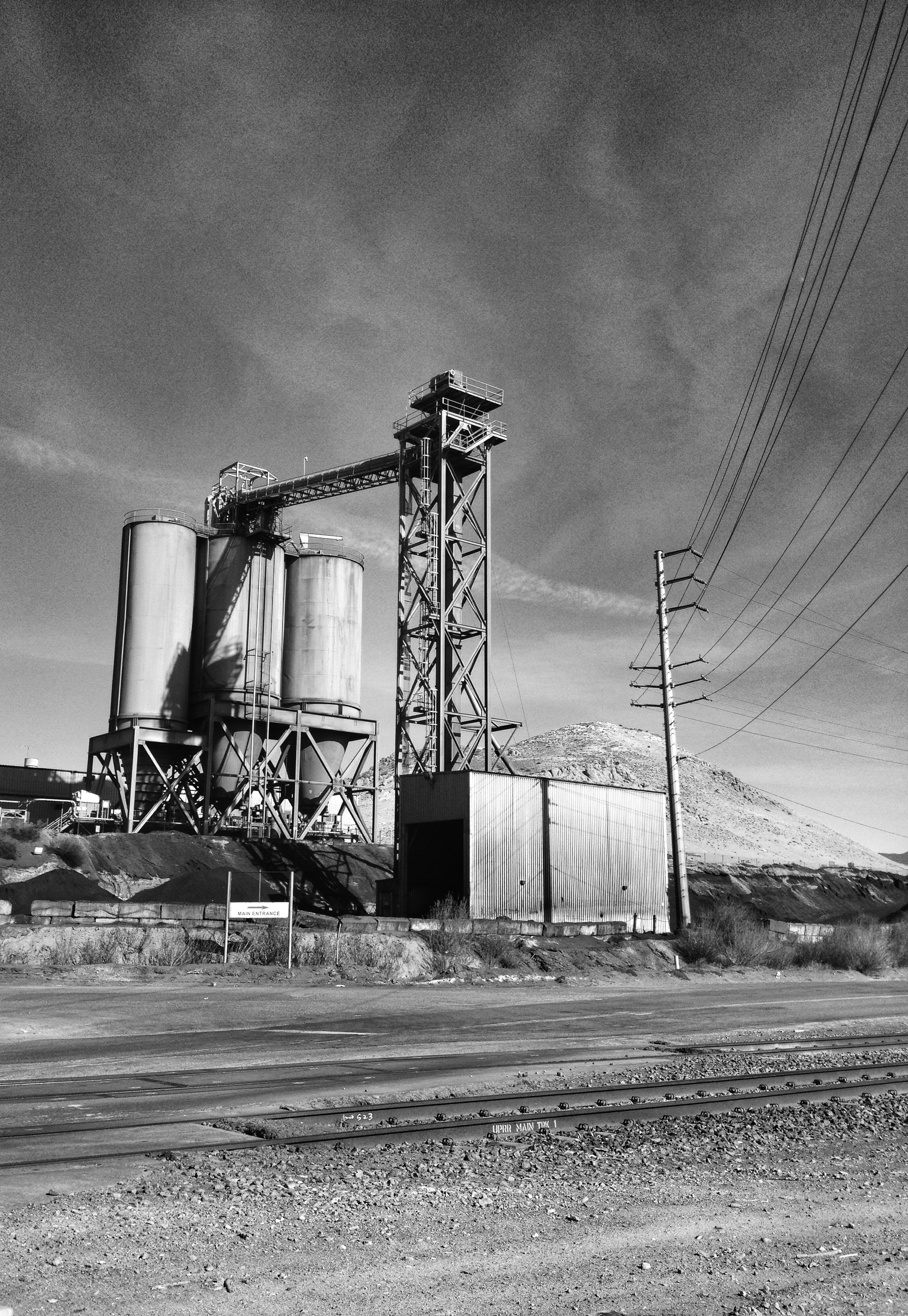
- Cement plant at Monolith, California

- Location in California Monolith (the United States)
- Coordinates: 35°07′12″N 118°22′27″W
- Country: United States
- State: California
- County: Kern
- Elevation: 3,967 ft (1,209 m)

Monolith (formerly Aqueduct) is an unincorporated community in the Tehachapi Valley, in Kern County, California, United States.

The community is located 4.5 miles (7.2 km) east of Tehachapi, at an elevation of 3,966 feet (1,209 m) in the southern Sierra Nevada and eastern Tehachapi Pass areas.

== History ==
The Aqueduct post office opened in 1908, and changed its name to Monolith in 1910.

Aqueduct−Monolith began as a camp for workers at a cement plant for the Owens Valley aqueduct project, supplying materials for the construction of concrete structures. William Mulholland bestowed the name change, due to a huge limestone deposit. At Monolith Substation in 2014, Southern California Edison commissioned the Tehachapi Energy Storage Project, which was the largest lithium-ion battery system operating in North America at the time of commissioning and one of the largest in the world.
