= Lamont, California =

Lamont
- census-designated place
- Interactive map of Lamont
- Location in California Location in the United States
- Coordinates: 35°15′35″N 118°54′51″W
- Country: United States
- State: California
- County: Kern

Government
  - Senate: Melissa Hurtado (D)
  - Assembly: Jasmeet Bains (D)
  - U. S. Congress: David Valadao (R)
  - Kern County: David R. Couch (R)

Area
  - Total: 4.820 sq mi (12.484 km^{2})
  - Land: 4.784 sq mi (12.391 km^{2})
  - Water: 0.036 sq mi (0.092 km^{2}) 0.74%
- Elevation: 404 ft (123 m)

Population (2020)
  - Total: 14,049
  - Density: 2,936.5/sq mi (1,133.8/km^{2})
- Time zone: UTC-8 (PST)
  - Summer (DST): UTC-7 (PDT)
- ZIP code: 93241
- Area code: 661
- FIPS code: 06-40088
- GNIS feature ID: 1660886

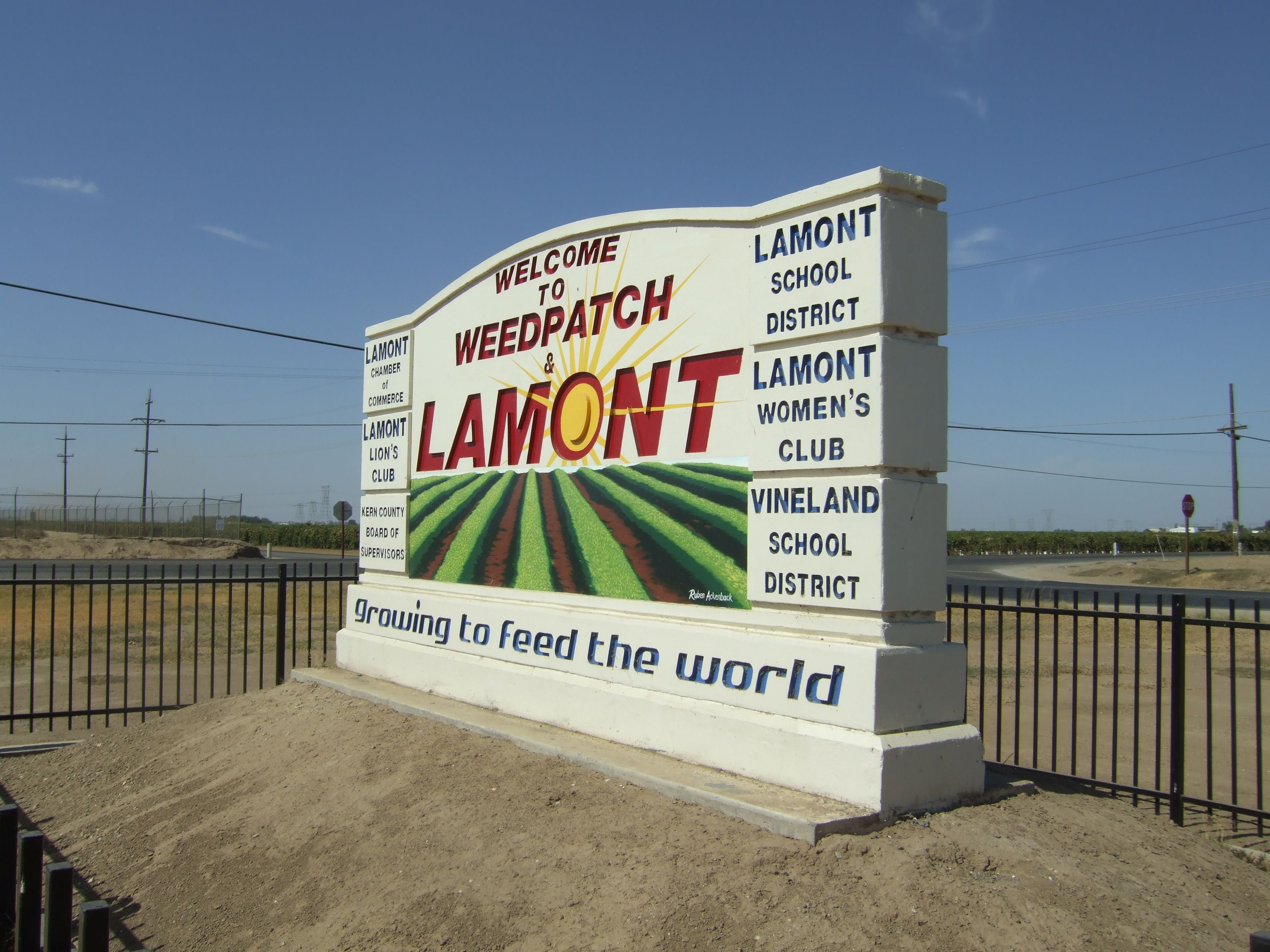
Welcome sign on California State Highway 184 for Lamont and the neighboring community of Weedpatch

Lamont is a census-designated place (CDP) in Kern County, California, United States. Lamont is located 9 miles (14 km) south-southeast of downtown Bakersfield, at an elevation of 404 feet (123 m). The population was 14,049 at the 2020 census, down from 15,120 at the 2010 census.

== Geography ==
Lamont is located in south-central California about 11 miles (18 km) from Bakersfield and about 89 miles (143 km) from Los Angeles.

According to the United States Census Bureau, the CDP has a total area of 4.8 sq mi (12 km^{2}), of which 4.8 sq mi (12 km^{2}) are land and 0.04 sq mi (0.10 km^{2}) (0.74%) is water.

== History ==
Lamont was founded in 1923. During the 1930s–1950s, large numbers of farm workers migrated to the Lamont area from the east seeking relief from the Great Depression and the Dust Bowl. The first post office opened in 1947.

The first public library in Lamont was opened in June 1912. It was located in the Weedpatch home of Phoebe Wells. Growth was rapid in the Lamont region, with the influx of workers in the oil industry, and in 1935, the library was moved to a new building. In 1952, the Kern County Board of Supervisors purchased a lot to construct a building that would house the library and a public health center. The facility was opened in January 1953. The branch remained in that building until January 1974, when it was relocated to a newer and larger location. Five years later, the branch was moved yet again to the former Lamont Community Building. To meet the ever-growing needs projected for the population in 1990, construction for a new building was made possible through funds provided by the California State Library under the Library Services and Construction Act, Title II, Community Development Block Grant funds from the United States Department of Housing and Urban Development. The old building was demolished, the new building was built, and opened to the public in early spring of 1998.

== Demographics ==
Historical population
Census	Pop.	Note	%±
1950	3,571		—
1960	6,177		73.0%
1970	7,007		13.4%
1980	9,616		37.2%
1990	11,517		19.8%
2000	13,296		15.4%
2010	15,120		13.7%
2020	14,049		−7.1%
U.S. Decennial Census; 1860–1870 1880-1890; 1900 1910 1920; 1930 1940 1950; 1960 1970 1980; 1990 2000 2010; 2020

Lamont first appeared as an unincorporated place in the 1950 U.S. census; and as a census designated place in the 1980 U.S. census.

=== Racial and ethnic composition ===
Lamont CDP, California – Racial and ethnic composition Note: the US Census treats Hispanic/Latino as an ethnic category. This table excludes Latinos from the racial categories and assigns them to a separate category. Hispanics/Latinos may be of any race.
Race / Ethnicity (NH = Non-Hispanic)	Pop 2000	Pop 2010	Pop 2020	% 2000	% 2010	% 2020
White alone (NH)	1,221	694	433	9.18%	4.59%	3.08%
Black or African American alone (NH)	33	20	12	0.25%	0.13%	0.09%
Native American or Alaska Native alone (NH)	36	30	16	0.27%	0.20%	0.11%
Asian alone (NH)	98	51	46	0.74%	0.34%	0.33%
Native Hawaiian or Pacific Islander alone (NH)	3	2	0	0.02%	0.01%	0.00%
Other race alone (NH)	3	7	29	0.02%	0.05%	0.21%
Mixed race or Multiracial (NH)	88	23	62	0.66%	0.15%	0.44%
Hispanic or Latino (any race)	11,814	14,293	13,451	88.85%	94.53%	95.74%
Total	13,296	15,120	14,049	100.00%	100.00%	100.00%

=== 2020 census ===
As of the 2020 census, Lamont had a population of 14,049. The population density was 2,936.7 inhabitants per square mile (1,133.9/km^{2}). The median age was 28.1 years. 34.2% of residents were under the age of 18, 11.5% were aged 18 to 24, 27.4% were aged 25 to 44, 19.5% were aged 45 to 64, and 7.4% were 65 years of age or older. For every 100 females, there were 100.4 males, and for every 100 females age 18 and over there were 101.6 males.

The census reported that 99.9% of the population lived in households, 9 people (0.1%) lived in non-institutionalized group quarters, and no one was institutionalized. 97.6% of residents lived in urban areas, while 2.4% lived in rural areas.

There were 3,519 households, of which 56.5% had children under the age of 18 living in them. 47.2% were married-couple households, 9.7% were cohabiting couple households, 16.3% were households with a male householder and no spouse or partner present, and 26.9% were households with a female householder and no spouse or partner present. 11.5% of households were one person, and 4.6% had someone living alone who was 65 years of age or older. The average household size was 3.99. There were 2,937 families (83.5% of all households).

There were 3,719 housing units at an average density of 777.4 units per square mile (300.2 units/km^{2}), of which 3,519 (94.6%) were occupied. Of the occupied units, 42.0% were owner-occupied and 58.0% were occupied by renters. 5.4% of housing units were vacant; the homeowner vacancy rate was 0.5% and the rental vacancy rate was 3.4%.

=== Demographic estimates ===
In 2023, the US Census Bureau estimated that 41.7% of the population were foreign-born. Of all people aged 5 or older, 17.9% spoke only English at home, 81.8% spoke Spanish, and 0.3% spoke Asian or Pacific Islander languages. Of those aged 25 or older, 40.9% were high school graduates and 3.8% had a bachelor's degree.

=== Income and poverty ===
The median household income in 2023 was $34,436, and the per capita income was $14,691. About 34.1% of families and 34.9% of the population were below the poverty line.

=== 2010 census ===
The 2010 United States census reported that Lamont had a population of 15,120. The population density was 3,268.6 inhabitants per square mile (1,262.0/km^{2}). The racial makeup of Lamont was 6,677 (44.2%) White, 130 (0.9%) African American 230 (1.5%) Native American, 72 (0.5%) Asian, 9 (0.1%) Pacific Islander, 7,351 (48.6%) from other races, and 651 (4.3%) from two or more races. Hispanics or Latinos of any race were 14,293 persons (94.5%).

The Census reported that 15,119 people lived in households, one lived in non-institutionalized group quarters, and no one was institutionalized.

Of the 3,405 households, 2,250 (66.1%) had children under the age of 18 living in them, 1,806 (53.0%) were opposite-sex married couples living together, 740 (21.7%) had a female householder with no husband present, 413 (12.1%) had a male householder with no wife present, 349 (10.2%) were unmarried opposite-sex partnerships, and 15 (0.4%) were same-sex married couples or partnerships. Some 270 households (7.9%) were made up of individuals, and 122 (3.6%) had someone living alone who was 65 years of age or older. The average household size was 4.44. With 2,959 families (86.9% of all households), the average family size was 4.46.

The population was distributed as 5,411 people (35.8%) under the age of 18, 2,253 people (14.9%) aged 18 to 24, 4,194 people (27.7%) aged 25 to 44, 2,453 people (16.2%) aged 45 to 64, and 809 people (5.4%) who were 65 years of age or older. The median age was 24.7 years. For every 100 females, there were 111.7 males. For every 100 females age 18 and over, there were 117.9 males.

The 3,598 housing units averaged 777.8 per square mile (300.3/km^{2}), of which 1,536 (45.1%) were owner-occupied, and 1,869 (54.9%) were occupied by renters. The homeowner vacancy rate was 1.5%; the rental vacancy rate was 3.3%; 7,065 people (46.7% of the population) lived in owner-occupied housing units and 8,054 people (53.3%) lived in rental housing units.

== Education ==
Lamont is served by the Lamont School District and the Kern High School District. The Lamont School District consists of Lamont Elementary School, Alicante Avenue School, Myrtle Avenue School, and Mountain View Middle School. The Kern High School District maintains Nueva High School.

== Public safety ==
The Kern County Sheriff's Department Lamont substation is responsible for providing law enforcement. Kern County Fire Department Station 51 provides fire protection. Hall Ambulance is the provider of emergency medical services.

== Media ==
The Lamont Reporter is the local weekly newspaper.

== Events ==
Every December, the community gathers together to kick off the holiday season with a parade down Main Street, hosted by the Lamont Chamber of Commerce.

== See also ==
- Camp Lamont
