= U.S. Route 466 =

Former Numbered Highway in the United States

U.S. Route 466
- US 466 highlighted in red

Route information
- Auxiliary route of US 66
- Length: 526 mi (847 km)
- Existed: April 25, 1933–December 3, 1971

Major junctions
- West end: SR 1 in Morro Bay, CA (1935–1965); California border at Primm, NV (1965–1971)
- US 101 from Atascadero, California to Paso Robles, California; US 99 / US 399 in Bakersfield; US 91 / I-15 from Barstow to Las Vegas, Nevada; US 93 / US 95 from Las Vegas to Boulder City, Nevada; US 93 from Boulder City to Kingman, Arizona
- East end: US 66 in Kingman, AZ (1935–1969); AZ border near Boulder City, NV (1969–1971)

Location
- Country: United States
- States: California, Nevada, Arizona

Highway system
- United States Numbered Highway System; List; Special; Divided
← I-405	CA	→ I-480
← SR 447	NV	→ SR 485
← SR 464	AZ	→ SR 473

U.S. Route 466 (US 466) was an east–west United States highway. Though it reached a length of around 500 miles (805 km), the route was co-signed with other US routes for much of its length. When California deleted most of its U.S. Highways in the mid-1960s, including US 466 in 1964, there was no longer a need for the designation.

The general route between Barstow and Kingman is now more directly served by Interstate 40.

The route is known for being the highway on which actor James Dean died in a car accident on September 30, 1955, at the intersection of CA 41 near Cholame, California. The intersection has been designated as James Dean Memorial Junction.

== Route description ==
=== California ===
US 466 shield in California

US 466 began in Morro Bay, continuing to US 101 before turning north and following the path of today's SR 41 to Shandon in San Luis Obispo County. From there, US 466 followed the path of today's SR 46 east. At Famoso, US 466 joined US 99 and ran south to Bakersfield. From Bakersfield, U.S. Route 466 generally followed what is now the alignment of SR 58. Between Barstow, California and the Nevada line, the route followed the path of today's Interstate 15 and was co-signed with U.S. Route 91.

=== Nevada ===
U.S. Route 466 entered Nevada at Primm. It headed north concurrent with U.S. Route 91 to Las Vegas, where the route followed Las Vegas Boulevard. In downtown Las Vegas, US 466 turned east on Fremont Street with U.S. Route 93 (and later, U.S. Route 95). The two routes followed Fremont Street and Boulder Highway heading southeast through Henderson and Boulder City towards the Arizona state line on Hoover Dam.

=== Arizona ===
Directional colored shields found on US 466 in Arizona during the 1950s.

From the Nevada state line on Hoover Dam, U.S. Route 466 remained co-signed with US 93 as it headed southeast. At Grasshopper Junction, US 66 / US 466 served the western terminus of Arizona State Route 62 (SR 62), which was the main route connecting Chloride to the rest of the state highway system. The highway was also the eastern terminus of SR 68 at Coyote Pass, which headed west towards Bullhead City and Laughlin, Nevada. The highway reached its eastern terminus in Kingman, entering town on Beale Street, where it connected to U.S. Route 66 at Front Street (now Andy Devine Boulevard). US 93 continued past the terminus of US 466, running concurrent with US 66 east out of Kingman.

== History ==
U.S. Route 466 (US 466) was originally commissioned on April 25, 1933, extending from U.S. Route 66 in Barstow, California to the Pacific Ocean at Morro Bay, California. On October 9, 1933, the American Association of State Highway Officials (AASHO) approved an extension of US 466 from Barstow to US 66 in Kingman, Arizona. From Kingman to Las Vegas, Nevada, US 466 replaced the original Arizona State Route 69 (SR 69) and Nevada State Route 26 (SR 26). US 466 would use the Boulder Dam to cross the Colorado River over Boulder Canyon between Nevada and Arizona. Between Las Vegas and Barstow, California, the route was co-signed with U.S. Route 91. However, the state of Arizona continued to sign the route between Hoover Dam (formerly Boulder Dam) and Kingman as SR 69, until May 16, 1935. This coincided with the completion of the main dam structure on May 29.

On June 17, 1935, US 93 was extended from its southern terminus at US 91 north of Las Vegas to US 66 in Barstow, being co-signed with US 466 from its eastern terminus at Kingman, Arizona to the US 91 junction in Las Vegas, Nevada. This left the California segment of US 466 as the only section of the route not co-signed with another route.

California decommissioned its section of US 466 during the 1964 state highway renumbering. The California state legislature re-designated the stand alone section of US 466 between Morro Bay and Barstow as California State Route 46 (SR 46), SR 99 and SR 58 respectively. On December 3, 1971, AASHTO approved a request from Arizona and Nevada to remove the US 466 entirely from both states, after which, the US 466 designation ceased to exist.

== Major intersections ==
State	County	Location	mi	km	Destinations	Notes
California	San Luis Obispo	Morro Bay	0	0.0	SR 1	
California	San Luis Obispo	Atascadero	19	31	US 101	
California	San Luis Obispo	Shandon	47	76	SR 41 south	Western end of SR 41 overlap
California	San Luis Obispo	Cholame	54	87	SR 41 north	Eastern end of SR 41 overlap
California	Kern	Blackwells Corner	81	130	SR 33	
California	Kern	Famoso	119	192	US 99 north	Western end of US 99 overlap
California	Kern	Bakersfield	139	224	US 99 south / SR 178	Eastern end of US 99 overlap
California	Kern	Mojave	205	330	US 6	
California	San Bernardino	Kramer Junction	243	391	US 395	
California	San Bernardino	Barstow	275	443	US 91 south to US 66	Western end of US 91 overlap
California	San Bernardino	Baker	338	544	SR 127 north	
Mojave Desert			400 0	640 0.0	California–Nevada state line	
Nevada	Clark	Jean	12	19	SR 53	
Nevada	Clark	Las Vegas	30	48	US 91 north / US 93 north / US 95 north	Eastern end of US 91 overlap; western end of US 93 and US 95 overlaps
Nevada	Clark	Henderson	44	71	SR 41	
Nevada	Clark	Alunite	49	79	US 95 south	Eastern end of US 95 overlap
Colorado River			57 0.00	92 0.00	Hoover Dam; Nevada–Arizona state line	
Arizona	Mohave	Grasshopper Junction	52.74	84.88	SR 62 east – Chloride	Western terminus of SR 62; now CR 125 east
Arizona	Mohave		67.59	108.78	SR 68 west – Bullhead City	Eastern terminus of SR 68
Arizona	Mohave	Kingman	72.59	116.82	US 66 / US 93 ends (Front Street) to SR 93 south – Needles, Flagstaff, Phoenix	Eastern terminus; eastern end of US 93 overlap
1.000 mi = 1.609 km; 1.000 km = 0.621 mi: Concurrency terminus
