= McKittrick Oil Field =

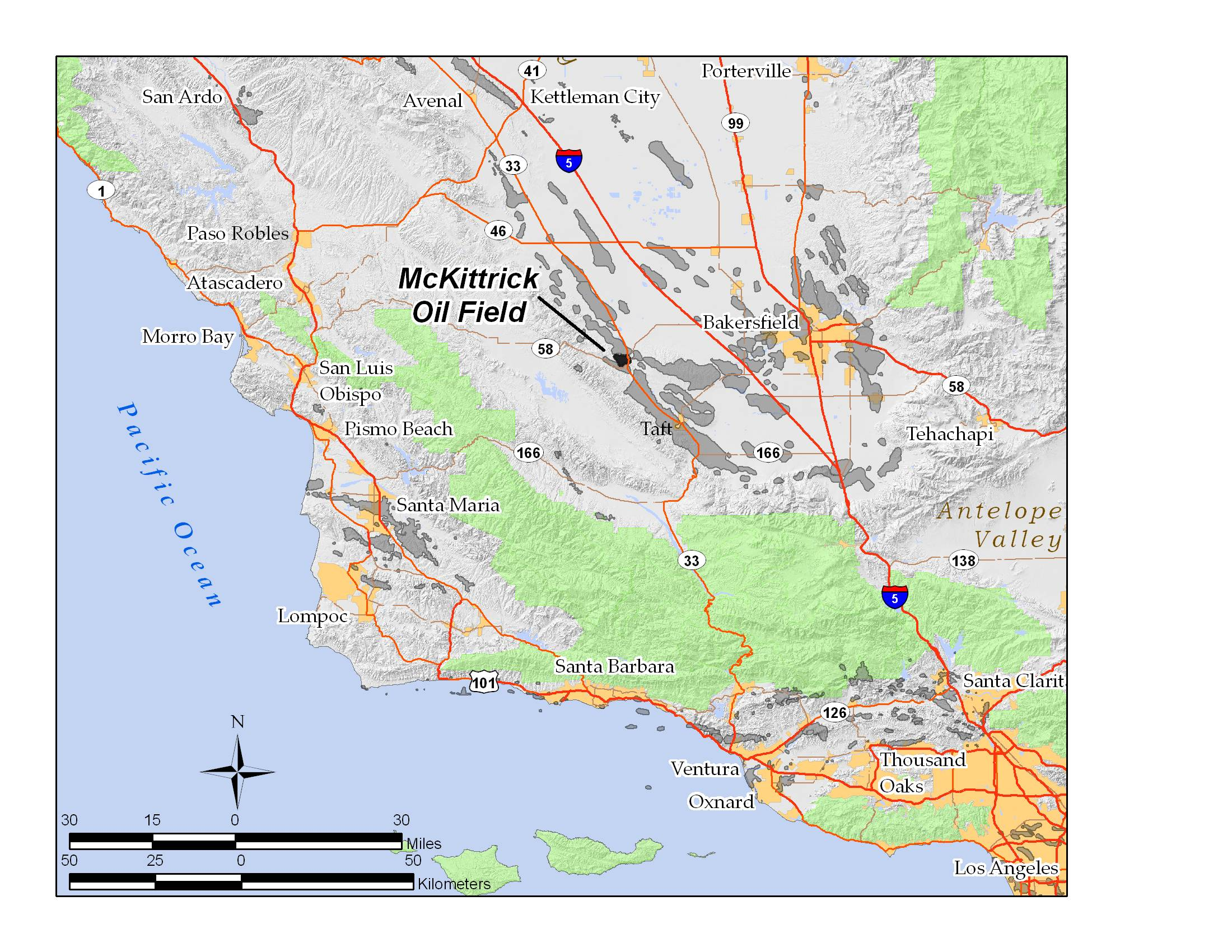
The McKittrick Oil Field in Kern County, California. Other oil fields are shown in gray.

The McKittrick Oil Field is a large oil and gas field in western Kern County, California. The town of McKittrick overlies the northeastern portion of the oil field. Recognized as an oil field in the 19th century, but known by Native Americans for thousands of years due to its tar seeps, the field is ranked 19th in California by total ultimate oil recovery, and has had a cumulative production of over 303 million barrels (48,200,000 m^{3}) of oil. The principal operators of the field as of 2008 were Chevron Corp. and Aera Energy LLC, but many independent oil exploration and production companies were also active on the field. The California Department of Oil, Gas and Geothermal Resources (DOGGR) estimates approximately 20 million recoverable barrels of oil remain in the ground.

== Setting ==
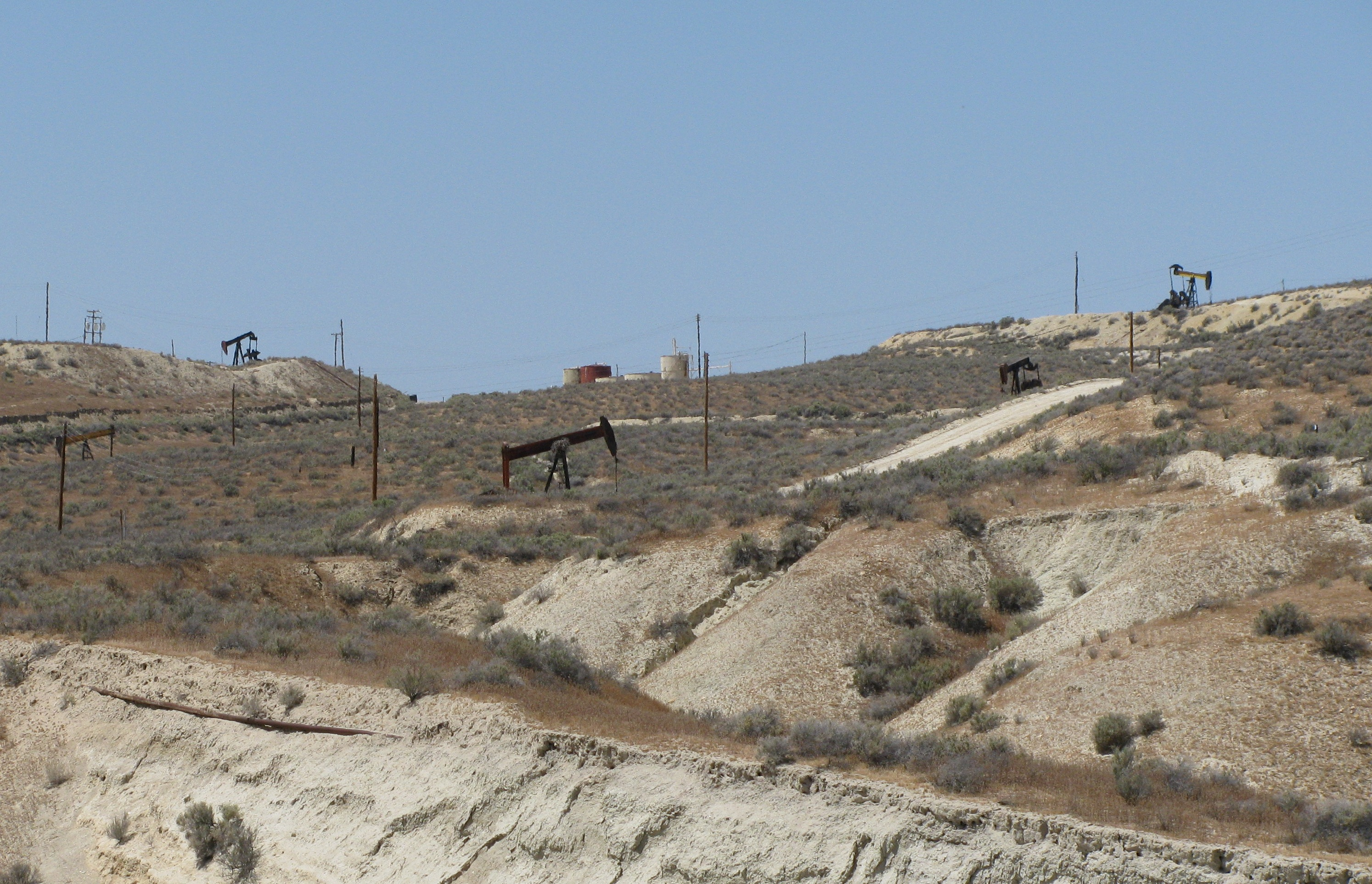
Oil wells and piping on the McKittrick Field, about a mile west of the town of McKittrick.

The oil field is in the McKittrick Valley and the adjacent foothills of the Temblor Range at the western edge of the San Joaquin Valley. California State Route 33 and 58 intersect at the town of McKittrick, and both routes cross over portions of the field. The climate is hot and arid to semi-arid, with an average annual rainfall of 5 to 6 inches (130 to 150 mm), and summertime highs commonly exceeding 100 °F (38 °C). Some subfreezing temperatures occur in the winter, with the mean freeze-free period being from 250 to 275 days. Drainage is to the northeast, away from the Temblors towards the Central Valley, and streams are dry for most of the year. The predominant vegetation in the vicinity of the field is low scrub, in particular the saltbush Atriplex lentiformis. Elevations on the field range from approximately 1,000 to 1,500 feet (300 to 460 m).

Many other productive oil fields are nearby. Adjacent to the north is the enormous, and densely developed Cymric Oil Field, and beyond that the South Belridge Oil Field; to the east is the Elk Hills Oil Field, famous in the Teapot Dome Scandal of the Warren G. Harding administration; adjacent to the southwest is the Belgian Anticline Oil Field, along Route 58; and to the southeast is the huge Midway-Sunset Oil Field, the third largest oil field in the United States.

The total productive area of the field is 3,970 acres (16.1 km^{2}). The field is about 5 mi (8.0 km) long on the southeast to northwest axis, and about 2.5 mi (4.0 km) across.

== Geology and paleontology ==
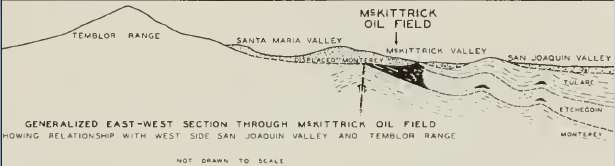
McKittrick Oil Field Geologic Cross Section

The predominant geologic feature, and the one that makes the McKittrick field distinctive, is the presence of a huge block of Monterey shale – more than 6 mi (9.7 km) long, approximately 1 mi (1.6 km) wide, and up to 2,000 ft (610 m) thick – which slipped off of the slopes of the adjacent Temblor Range during the Pleistocene and moved eastward onto the plain, almost entirely covering the field, and forming an impermeable cap over the oil-bearing rock. This mass of stone, consisting of over 3 cu mi (13 km^{3}) of rock, moved 2 to 3 miles (3.2 to 4.8 km) from its source region, and down about 2,000 feet (610 m) in elevation. While it probably did not move into its present position all at once, the incident must have been dramatic.

Another unusual feature of the McKittrick field is its large tar seeps, points on the surface where petroleum has migrated upwards, forming pools. In California, the McKittrick Tar Pits are second only to the La Brea Tar Pits in fame, and have yielded dozens of skeletons of extinct megafauna with ages from about 10,000 to 40,000 years. The tar seeps outcrop in an area about 4 mi (6.4 km) long, adjacent to the McKittrick Thrust Fault, which defines the southwestern boundary of the oil field. They are found in areas where the overlying Monterey formation, which tumbled down the Temblors during the Pleistocene, eroded away, exposing the oil-bearing strata. When oil reaches the surface, it is exposed to biodegradation, evaporation, and oxidation, forming asphaltum. This series of tar seeps is the most extensive in the state, although none of the individual seeps are as large as the La Brea Tar Pits.

Oil in the McKittrick field is in 13 separate pools: eight in the Northeast Area, and five in the Main Area. The most productive pools have been the Tulare-San Joaquin, Olig, and Basal Reef Ridge in the Main Area, and the Tulare-San Joaquin, Phacoides, and Oceanic in the Northeast Area. Oil API gravity varies between the different pools, with some bearing heavy crude of API gravity 12, and others with lighter oil, such as the Phacoides which reported an average value of 33. Enhanced recovery techniques such as fire flooding and steam flooding have been used since the 1960s to improve recovery of the heavier oils, while water flooding was used in the 1970s and early 1980s in the Phacoides to improve recovery (with limited success, as that pool peaked in 1966).

Major paleontological study of the remains in the tar pits began in 1921 with the first large road cut through the area. Skeletons of many now-extinct mammals have been recovered, including camels, mammoths, dire wolves, saber toothed cats, deer, and bison. Bird species found include ducks, storks, herons, and various shorebirds – mainly species adapted to forage in shallow water.

== History, production, and operations ==
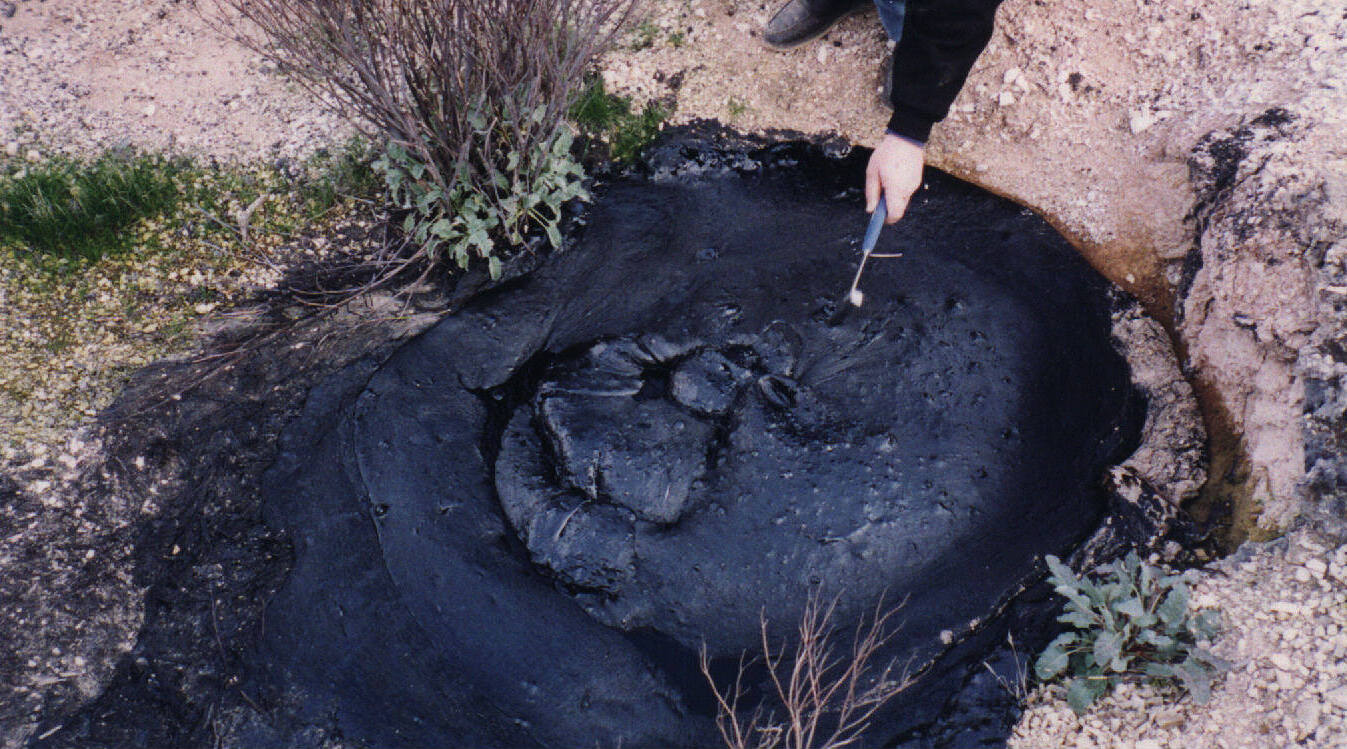
McKittrick Tar Seep North of Highway 58. The person is lighting a natural-gas bubble.

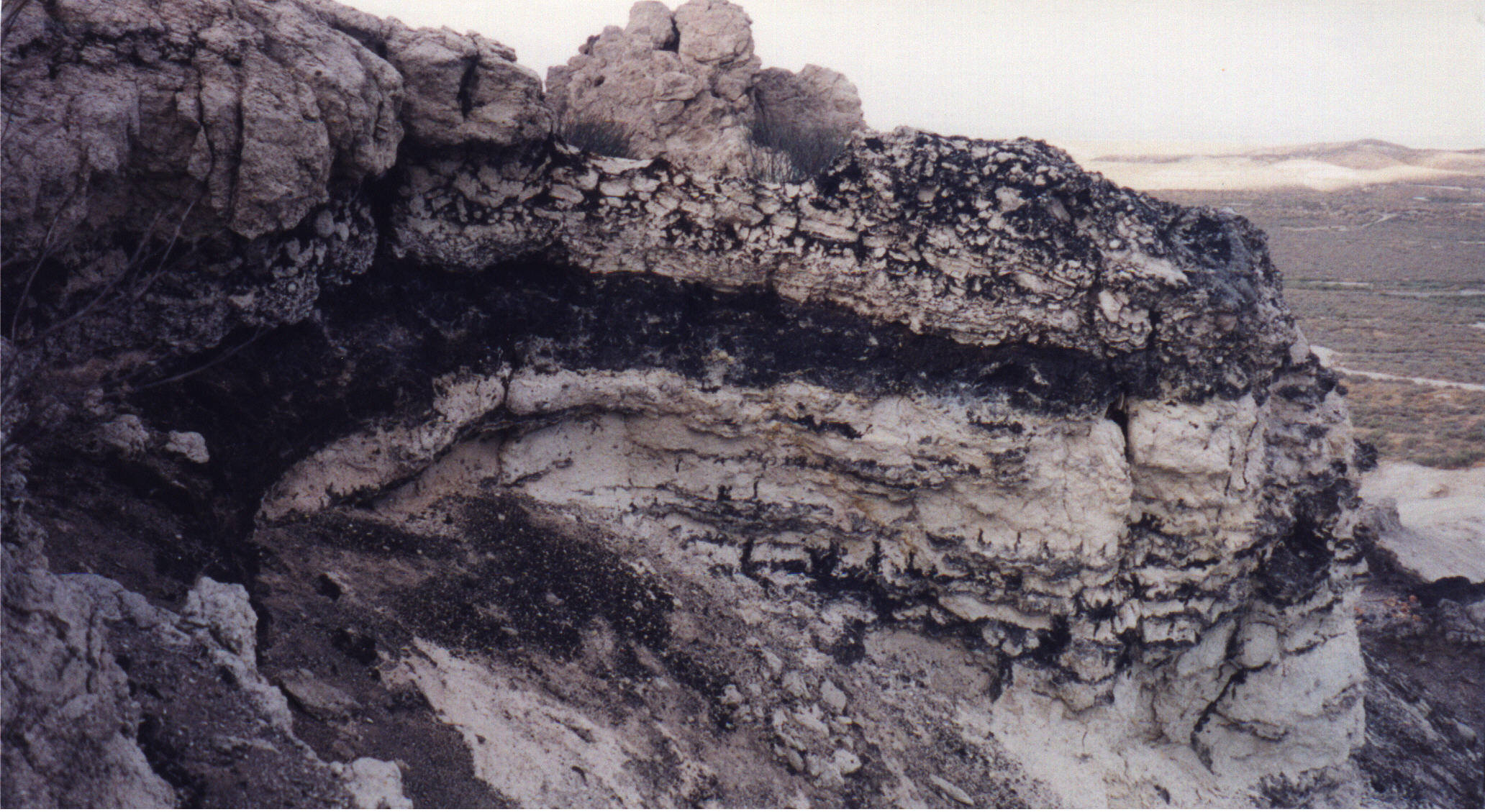
Outcrop of diatomite with streaks of oil, McKittrick oilfield. There are numerous oil seeps in this area. 2000 photo.

The McKittrick Tar Pits have been known to the local Native American population, the Yokuts, from prehistoric times. They used the asphaltum as a sealant, for waterproofing, for decoration, for adhesive, and for trade.

In the 1860s, San Joaquin Valley settlers made the first attempts to mine the asphaltum, digging pits, trenches, and tunnels. They refined the viscous substance onsite, making it into lubricating oil and kerosene. These early attempts were only marginally profitable, but this changed in 1896 when the first real oil well was drilled. The Klondike Oil Company's Shamrock gusher, which spewed 1,300 barrels (210 m^{3}) of oil per day, was not only the first gusher in the region, but the first significant oil well in the San Joaquin Valley, which went on to become one of the richest petroleum regions in the nation.

Many of the deeper pools were found in the 1960s, and some of them proved not only to have higher quality oil, but were more productive. In the Northeast Area, the Phacoides, Oceanic, and Point of Rocks pools vary from 7,900 to 9,100 ft (2,400 to 2,800 m) below ground surface; the temperature of the oil varies from 230 to 260 °F (110 to 127 °C) at that depth, and the initial reservoir pressures were also high, up to 4,100 psi (28,000 kPa), pressures that would have caused major blowouts and gushers during the early part of the century, but can be better managed with modern technology.

As of 2008, there were 1,135 producing oil wells on the field. Producers besides Chevron Corp., the largest, included Aera Energy LLC, Berry Petroleum, Vintage, E & B Natural Resources Management Corp., Plains Exploration & Production, Longbow LLC, and others.

== California Historical Landmark ==
California Standard Oil Well 1
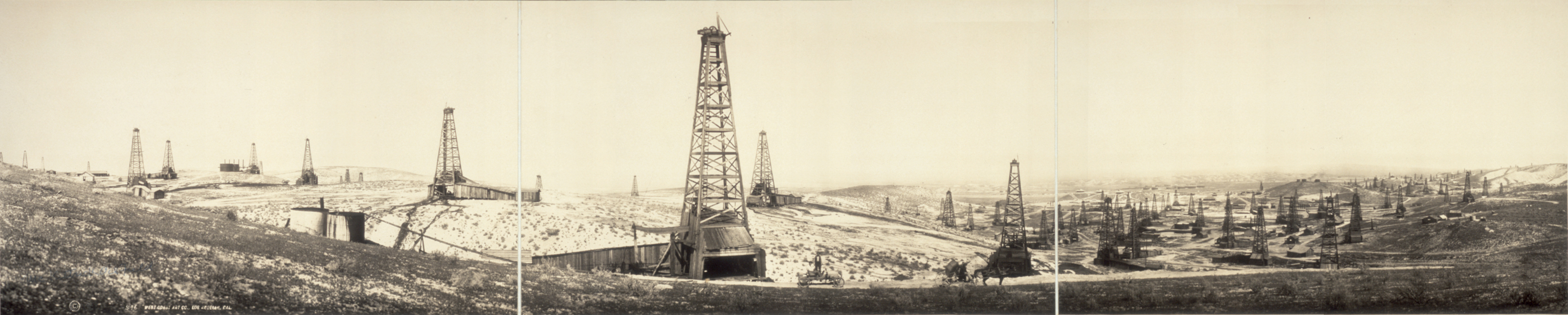
- California Standard Oil Well 1 at McKittrick
- Interactive map of California Standard Oil Well 1
- Location: 1 mile south of McKittrick, California
- Coordinates: 35°17′54″N 119°38′02″W

California Historical Landmark
- Official name: California Standard Oil Well 1
- Designated: November 7, 1941
- Reference no.: 376

California Historical Landmark reads:

NO. 376 CALIFORNIA STANDARD OIL WELL 1 - This well was one of the early wells that in 1899 started a new oil field called the McKittrick Field. The well pumped about 150 barrels of oil per day for the first six months - its last production was in April 1929.

== See also ==
- California Historical Landmarks in Kern County
- California Historical Landmark
