= Derby Acres, California =

Derby Acres
- Unincorporated Community; Census Designated Place
- Location in Kern County and the state of California

- Location in the United States
- Coordinates: 35°14′50″N 119°35′43″W
- Country: United States
- State: California
- County: Kern

Government
  - State Senator: Shannon Grove (R)
  - Assemblymember: Stan Ellis (R)
  - U. S. Rep.: Vince Fong (R)

Area
  - Total: 3.58 sq mi (9.27 km^{2})
  - Land: 3.58 sq mi (9.27 km^{2})
  - Water: 0 sq mi (0.00 km^{2}) 0%
- Elevation: 1,375 ft (419 m)

Population (2020)
  - Total: 301
  - Density: 84.0/sq mi (32.45/km^{2})
- Time zone: UTC-8 (PST)
  - Summer (DST): UTC-7 (PDT)
- ZIP code: 93224
- Area code: 661
- FIPS code: 06-18926
- GNIS feature ID: 0241420

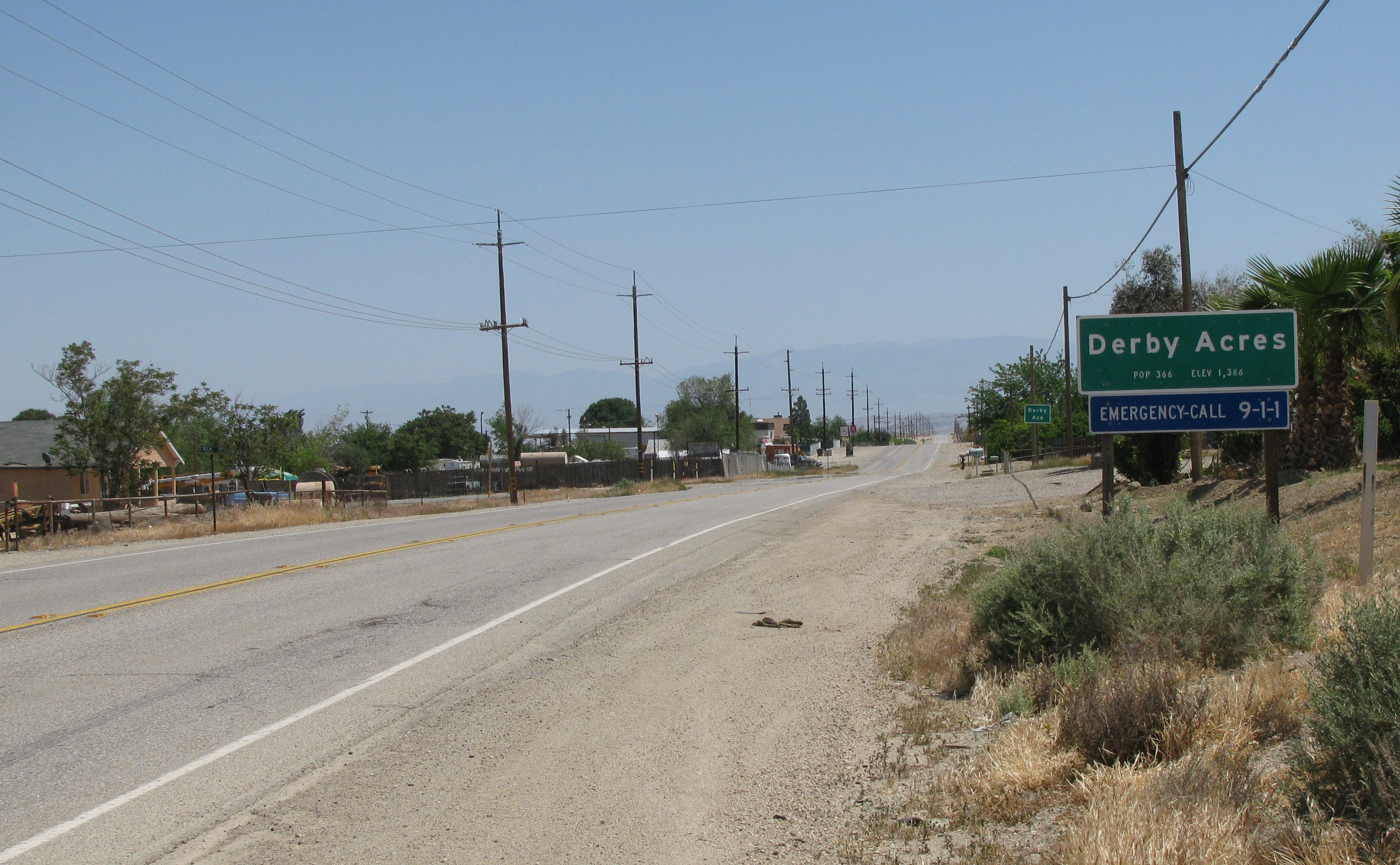
Derby Acres, looking south along California State Route 33.

Derby Acres is a census-designated place (CDP) in Kern County, California, United States. Derby Acres is located 5.5 miles (8.9 km) north-northwest of Fellows, at an elevation of 1,375 feet (419 m). The population was 301 at the 2020 census, down from 322 at the 2010 census. The town is on State Route 33 at the northern extremity of the Midway-Sunset Oil Field, about five miles (8 km) southeast of McKittrick.

== Geography ==
Derby Acres is located at 35°14′50″N 119°35′43″W.

According to the United States Census Bureau, the CDP has a total area of 3.6 square miles (9.3 km^{2}), all land.

== History ==
Derby Acres was founded in the 1930s.

== Demographics ==
Historical population
Census	Pop.	Note	%±
2000	376		—
2010	322		−14.4%
2020	301		−6.5%
U.S. Decennial Census; 1860–1870 1880-1890; 1900 1910 1920; 1930 1940 1950; 1960 1970 1980; 1990 2000 2010; 2020

Derby Acres first appeared as a census designated place in the 2000 U.S. census.

=== 2020 ===
Derby Acres CDP, California – Racial and ethnic composition Note: the US Census treats Hispanic/Latino as an ethnic category. This table excludes Latinos from the racial categories and assigns them to a separate category. Hispanics/Latinos may be of any race.
Race / Ethnicity (NH = Non-Hispanic)	Pop 2000	Pop 2010	Pop 2020	% 2000	% 2010	% 2020
White alone (NH)	339	279	226	90.16%	86.65%	75.08%
Black or African American alone (NH)	0	0	3	0.00%	0.00%	1.00%
Native American or Alaska Native alone (NH)	4	1	1	1.06%	0.31%	0.33%
Asian alone (NH)	0	0	3	0.00%	0.00%	1.00%
Native Hawaiian or Pacific Islander alone (NH)	2	0	0	0.53%	0.00%	0.00%
Other race alone (NH)	0	0	2	0.00%	0.00%	0.66%
Mixed race or Multiracial (NH)	2	6	14	0.53%	1.86%	4.65%
Hispanic or Latino (any race)	29	36	52	7.71%	11.18%	17.28%
Total	376	322	301	100.00%	100.00%	100.00%

The 2020 United States census reported that Derby Acres had a population of 301. The population density was 84.1 inhabitants per square mile (32.5/km^{2}). The racial makeup of Derby Acres was 230 (76.4%) White, 4 (1.3%) African American, 7 (2.3%) Native American, 4 (1.3%) Asian, 0 (0.0%) Pacific Islander, 27 (9.0%) from other races, and 29 (9.6%) from two or more races. Hispanic or Latino of any race were 52 persons (17.3%).

The whole population lived in households. There were 122 households, out of which 44 (36.1%) had children under the age of 18 living in them, 55 (45.1%) were married-couple households, 12 (9.8%) were cohabiting couple households, 31 (25.4%) had a female householder with no partner present, and 24 (19.7%) had a male householder with no partner present. 30 households (24.6%) were one person, and 8 (6.6%) were one person aged 65 or older. The average household size was 2.47. There were 82 families (67.2% of all households).

The age distribution was 74 people (24.6%) under the age of 18, 19 people (6.3%) aged 18 to 24, 77 people (25.6%) aged 25 to 44, 67 people (22.3%) aged 45 to 64, and 64 people (21.3%) who were 65 years of age or older. The median age was 40.4 years. For every 100 females, there were 100.7 males.

There were 133 housing units at an average density of 37.1 units per square mile (14.3 units/km^{2}), of which 122 (91.7%) were occupied. Of these, 86 (70.5%) were owner-occupied, and 36 (29.5%) were occupied by renters.

=== 2010 ===
At the 2010 census Derby Acres had a population of 322. The population density was 89.9 inhabitants per square mile (34.7/km^{2}). The racial makeup of Derby Acres was 289 (89.8%) White, 0 (0.0%) African American, 1 (0.3%) Native American, 0 (0.0%) Asian, 0 (0.0%) Pacific Islander, 23 (7.1%) from other races, and 9 (2.8%) from two or more races. Hispanic or Latino of any race were 36 people (11.2%).

The whole population lived in households, no one lived in non-institutionalized group quarters and no one was institutionalized.

There were 123 households, 35 (28.5%) had children under the age of 18 living in them, 66 (53.7%) were opposite-sex married couples living together, 10 (8.1%) had a female householder with no husband present, 8 (6.5%) had a male householder with no wife present. There were 8 (6.5%) unmarried opposite-sex partnerships, and 1 (0.8%) same-sex married couples or partnerships. 29 households (23.6%) were one person and 15 (12.2%) had someone living alone who was 65 or older. The average household size was 2.62. There were 84 families (68.3% of households); the average family size was 3.10.

The age distribution was 63 people (19.6%) under the age of 18, 40 people (12.4%) aged 18 to 24, 73 people (22.7%) aged 25 to 44, 99 people (30.7%) aged 45 to 64, and 47 people (14.6%) who were 65 or older. The median age was 41.5 years. For every 100 females, there were 92.8 males. For every 100 females age 18 and over, there were 100.8 males.

There were 144 housing units at an average density of 40.2 per square mile, of the occupied units 98 (79.7%) were owner-occupied and 25 (20.3%) were rented. The homeowner vacancy rate was 6.7%; the rental vacancy rate was 19.4%. 249 people (77.3% of the population) lived in owner-occupied housing units and 73 people (22.7%) lived in rental housing units.
