= Midway-Sunset Oil Field =

Oil field in Kern County, San Joaquin Valley, California

Coordinates: 35.1301°N 119.4608°W

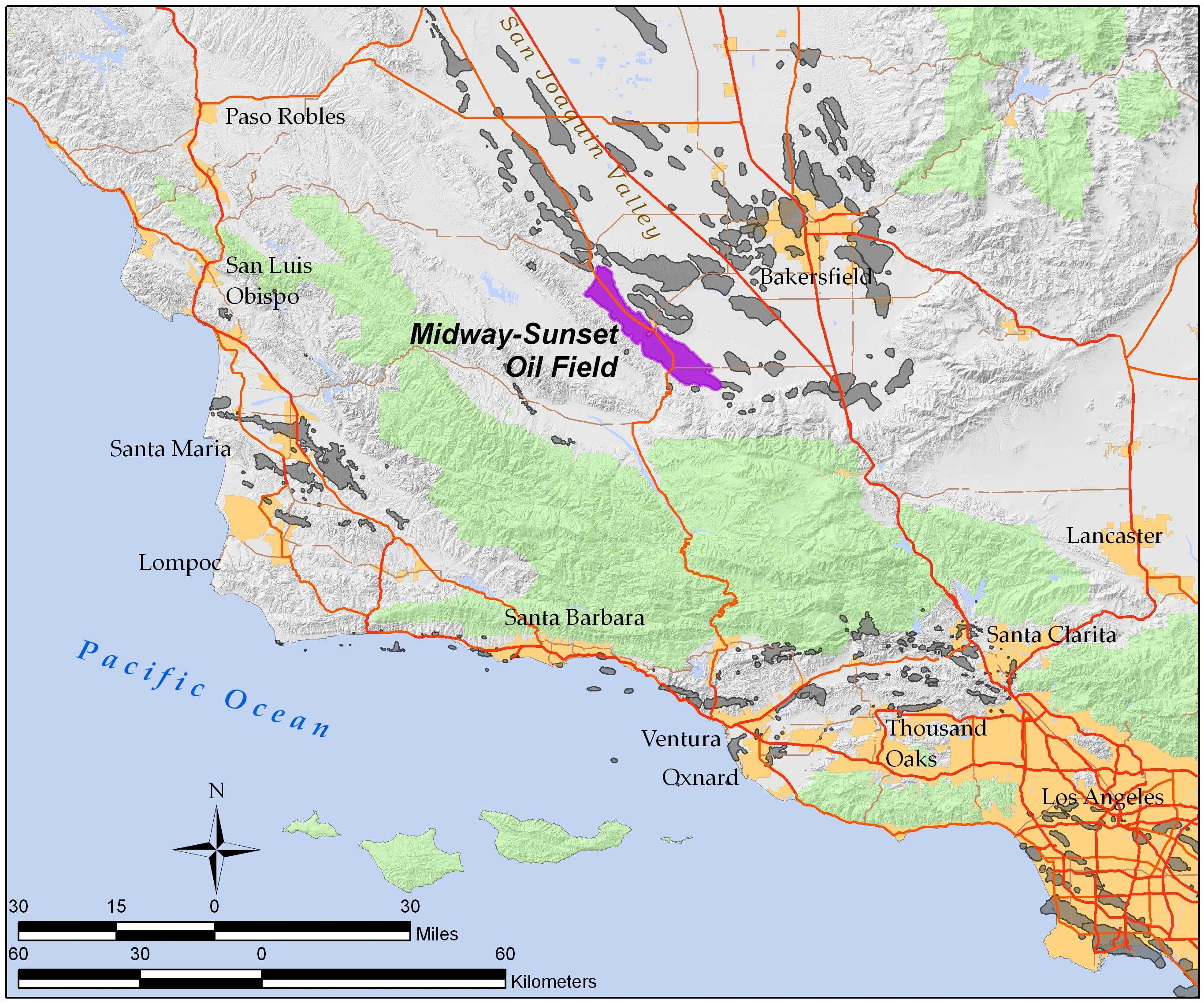
The Midway-Sunset Oil Field in Southern and Central California. Other oil fields are shown in gray.

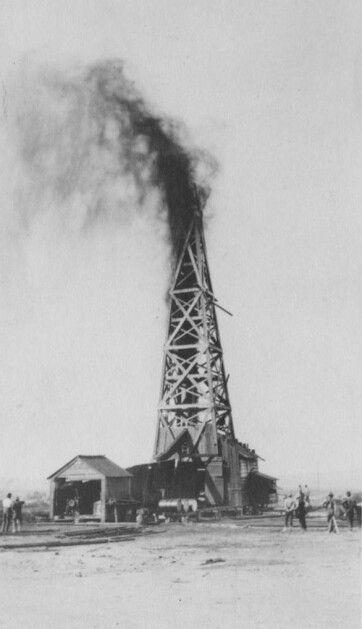
Midway Field Well 2-6 in 1909, known as the first gusher

The Midway-Sunset Oil Field is a large oil field in Kern County, San Joaquin Valley, California in the United States. It is the largest known oilfield in California and also the largest oil field in the country by total oil in place (around 27 billion barrels of mostly heavy oil), though Alaska's Prudhoe Bay Oil Field and the East Texas Oil Field have larger total production values of over 13 billion barrels and 5.4 billion barrels respectively compared to Midway-Sunset which has produced nearly 4 billion barrels.

The field was discovered in 1894, and through the end of 2023 had produced close to 4 billion barrels (640,000,000 m^{3}) of oil. At the end of 2008 its estimated reserves amounted to approximately 532 million barrels (84,600,000 m^{3}), 18% of California's estimated total.

== Setting ==
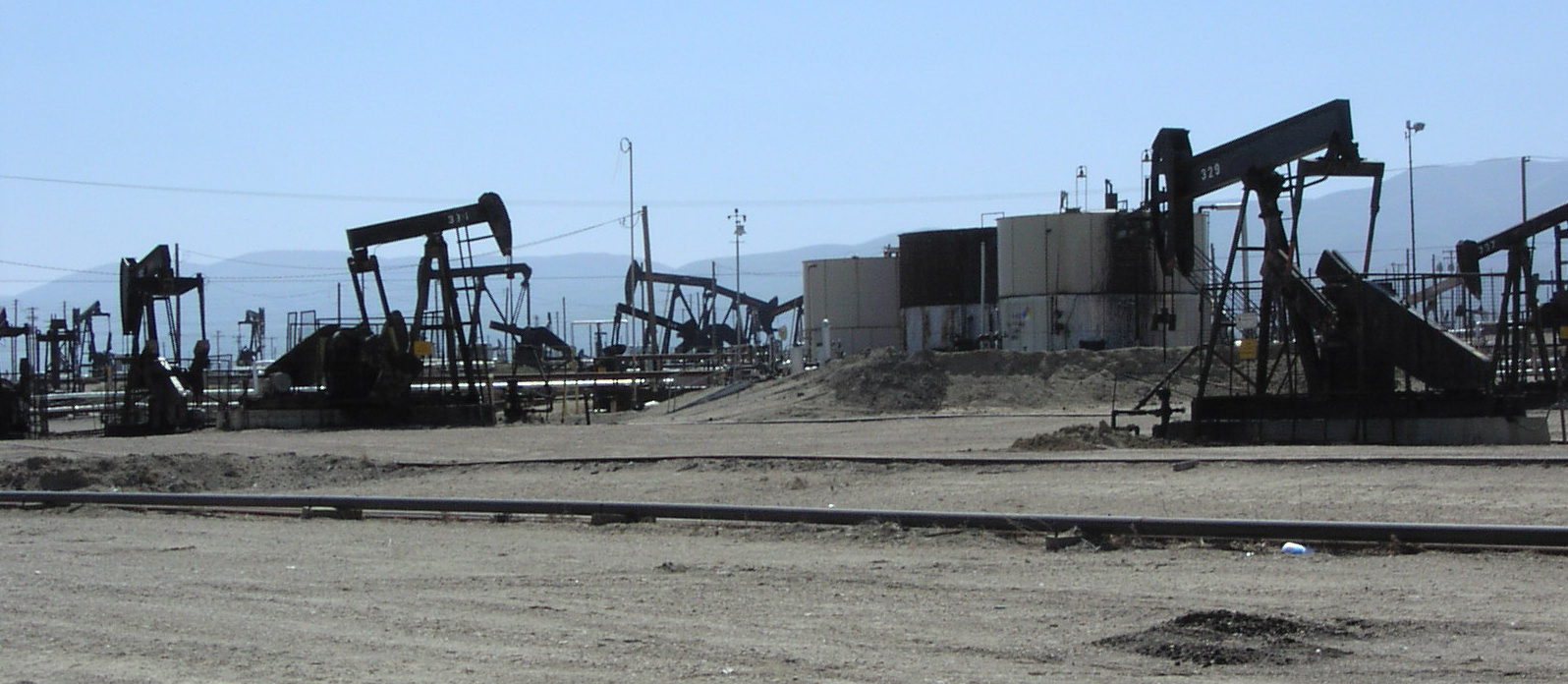
Oil wells and storage tanks west of Highway 33, on the Midway-Sunset field

The oil field runs southeast to northwest, with a length of approximately 20 miles (30 km) and a width of 3 to 4 miles (5 to 6 km), from east of Maricopa to south of McKittrick, paralleling the Temblor Range to the southwest. Most of the oil field is in the Midway Valley and the northeastern foothills of the Temblor Range. To the northeast are the Buena Vista Hills, paralleling the Midway Valley and the Temblors; the mostly exhausted, and partially abandoned Buena Vista Oil Field lies beneath this adjacent low range of hills.

State Route 33 runs along the axis of the Midway-Sunset for much of its length, and the towns of Taft, Maricopa, and Fellows are built directly on the oil field. Other oil fields along Route 33 going northwest within Kern County include the Cymric Oil Field, McKittrick Oil Field, and the large South Belridge Oil Field. Route 33 is not the only public road through the field: roughly paralleling 33, but closer to the Temblor Range, is Midoil Road, which winds through the field and along its southwestern boundary. The road commences from Taft Heights, passes through Fellows, and joins Mocal Road, which passes through the most densely developed part of the field, and rejoins Route 33 just south of Derby Acres. Crocker Springs Road, which passes over the Temblor Range to the Carrizo Plain, intersects Mocal Road about 2 miles (3.2 km) south of its intersection with Route 33. Another public road that passes through part of the Midway-Sunset Field is Petroleum Club Road, which runs southeast from Taft, and passes the site of the Lakeview Gusher.

== Geology ==
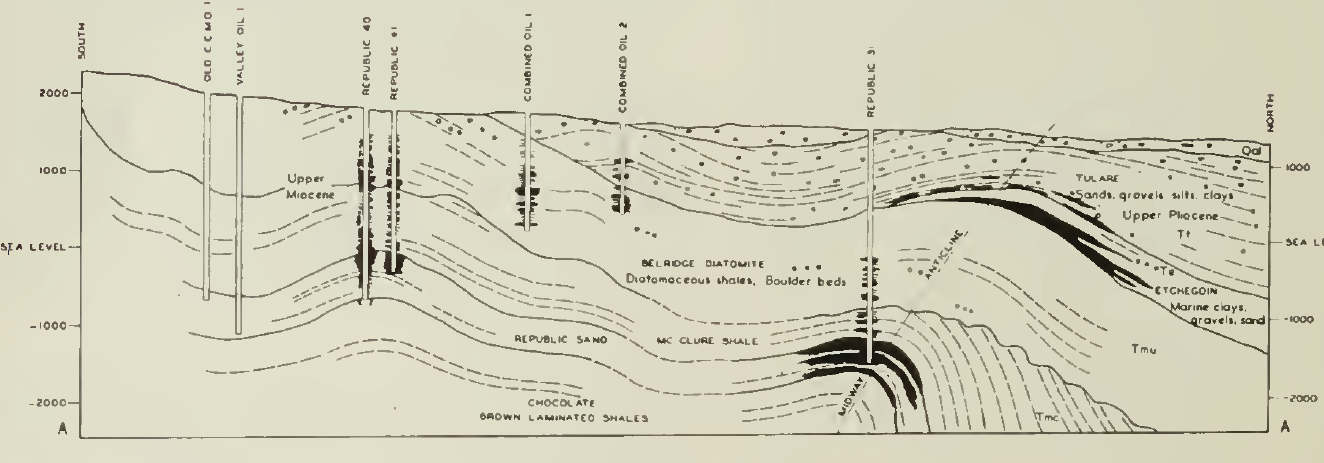
Midway Sunset Oil Field Geologic Cross Section

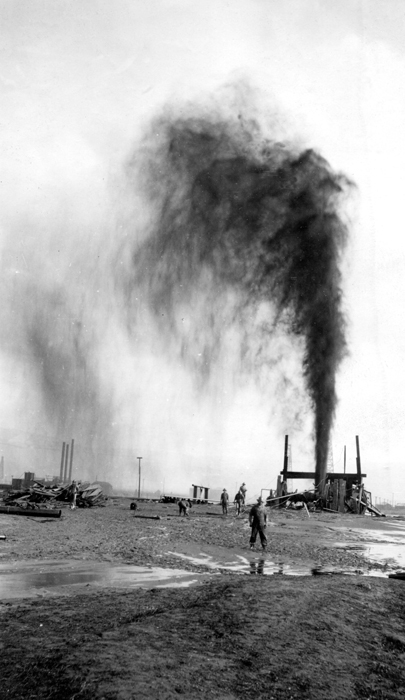
The Lakeview #2 gusher (not the more famous Lakeview #1 gusher), 20 May 1914

While the Midway-Sunset field is a large contiguous area covering more than 30 square miles (80 km^{2}), it comprises 22 identifiable and separately-named reservoirs in six geologic formations, ranging in age from the Pleistocene Tulare Formation (the most recent geologically, the closest to the surface, and the first to be discovered), to the Temblor Formation, of Miocene age (the oldest, and one of the last to be discovered). Throughout the field, the Tulare is often the capping impermeable formation, underneath which oil collects, but in some areas it is a productive unit in its own right. Its average depth is 200 to 1,400 feet (60 to 430 m).

One of the next reservoirs to be discovered was the Gusher Pool, which, when found in 1909, took its name from the event itself: a large oil gusher. This occurrence was eclipsed spectacularly the next year, when drillers found the Lakeview Pool, unexpectedly drilling into a reservoir of oil under intense pressure, later estimated at approximately 1,300 psi (9.0 MPa) from the heights attained by the spewing oil. The resulting Lakeview Gusher was the longest-lasting and most productive oil gusher in U.S. history.

Drillers continued to find new oil reservoirs throughout the 20th century, with new discoveries still occurring in the 1980s. Most reservoirs occur in the Miocene-age Monterey Formation, with depths usually to 4,900 feet (1,500 m), although one discovery, the "PULV" Pool of 1979, was 8,700 feet (2,700 m) below ground surface. The only well developed at this depth, and the only well in the PULV pool, was abandoned a year after it was drilled.

== Operations ==
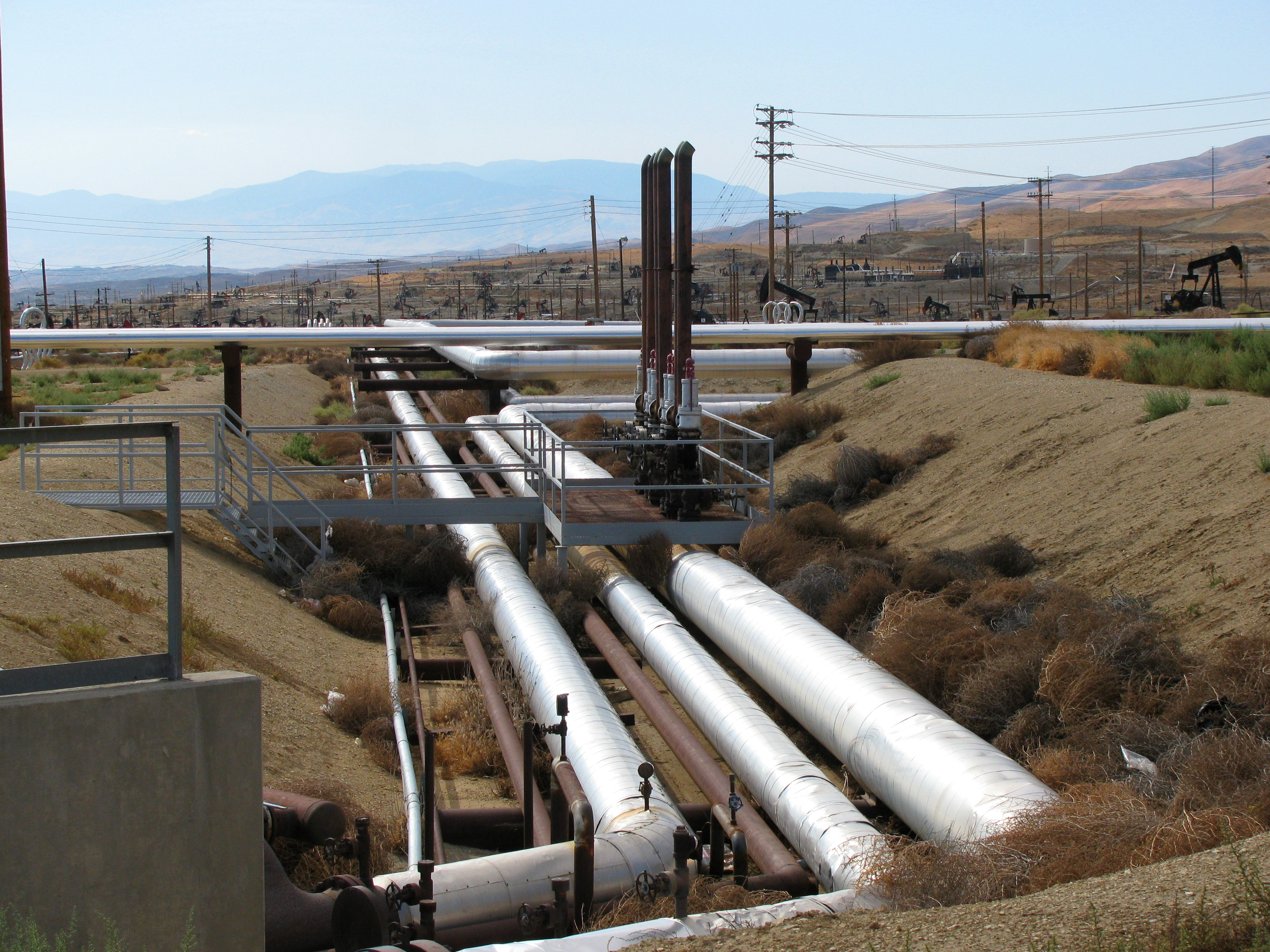
Steam pipes emerging from the Midway Sunset Cogeneration Plant to steam the field. Note the hundreds of pumping units in the background; this is among the most densely developed parts of the field.

The principal operators of Midway-Sunset, as of 2008, were Aera Energy LLC and the Chevron Corporation. Other operators on the field included large firms such as Occidental Petroleum and Plains Exploration & Production, as well as numerous independents, such as Holmes Western Oil Corporation, Berry Petroleum, E&B Natural Resources, Crimson Resource Management. As of the end of 2008, the most recent date for which data was available, the field contained 11,494 producing wells, more than any other oil field in California (the Kern River Field was second at 9,689). A traveler along State Route 33 between Maricopa and McKittrick will see hundreds of pumpjacks, the relatively small proportion of the oil wells that are visible from the highway.

Several enhanced oil recovery technologies have been employed at Midway-Sunset. Since the oil is heavy, and does not flow freely, it can be assisted by thermal methods, which include steamflooding, cyclic steam, and fire flooding. A 20 MW off-the-grid photovoltaic power facility started heating a 100 MWh heat battery in 2025, providing further heat. Waterflooding is also used to boost reservoir pressures.

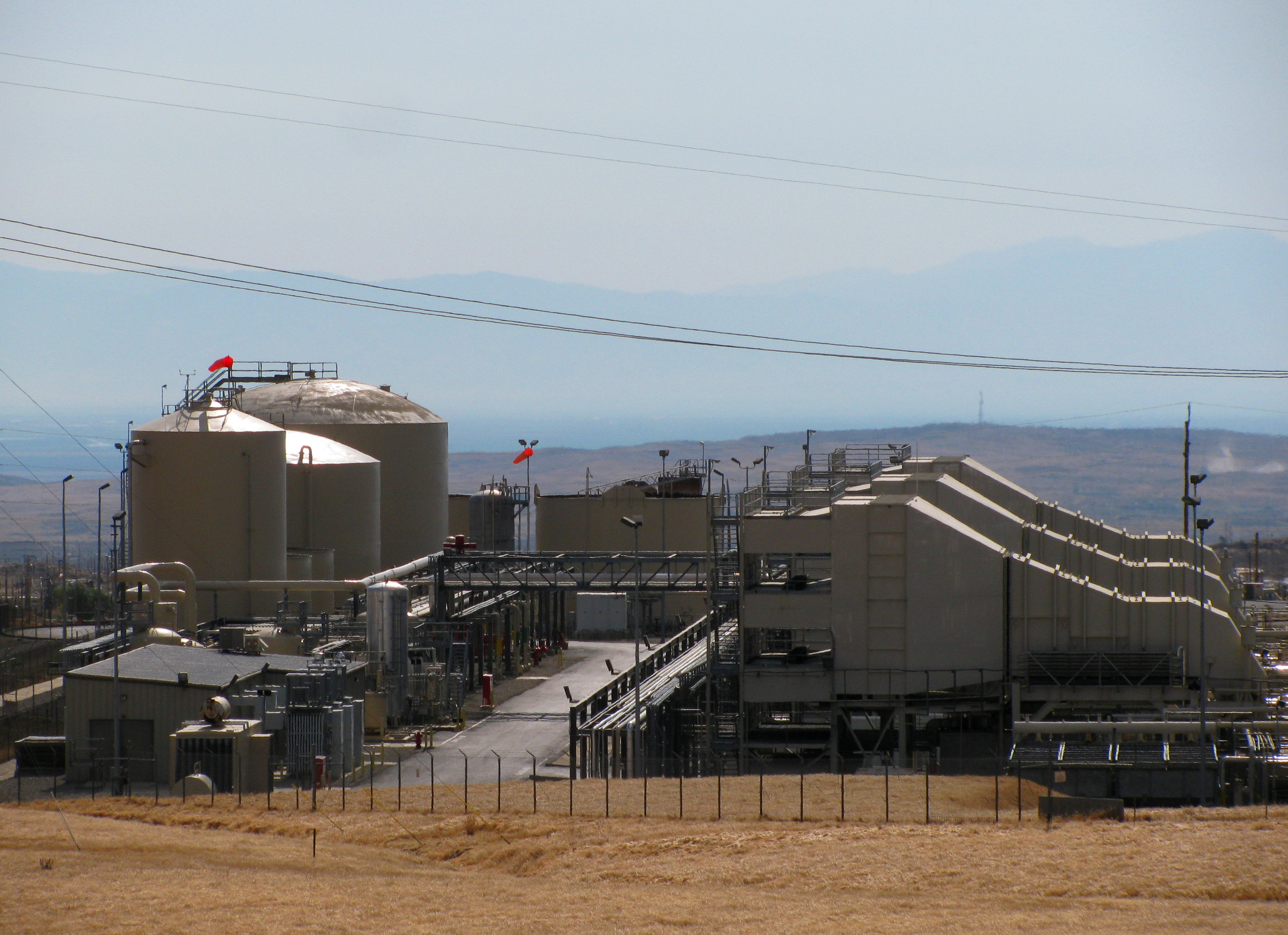
Cogeneration plant, which burns gas from the field to produce steam for enhanced recovery, and also provides electricity for California's power grid.

=== Cogeneration ===
As the Midway-Sunset field has a large amount of heavy oil requiring steam to allow its recovery, many of the field operators have built cogeneration plants to both sell power to the electric grid and create steam for their operations. This kind of power plant burns natural gas, abundantly available on site, and converts the energy into both electricity and steam used to flood the heavy oil reservoir in the field itself.

One of the largest of these, a 225-megawatt facility, was built by the Sun Cogeneration Company and a subsidiary of Southern California Edison on the western boundary of the field, along Crocker Springs Road. A construction permit was approved in 1987 and the plant began operation two years later; it is now known as the Midway-Sunset Cogeneration Company. The State Energy Commission only allowed construction of the plant after environmental mitigation measures, including habitat protection for several endangered species living in the vicinity, including the San Joaquin kit fox. In 2008, the company operating the plant refunded $85.7 million to the State of California in a claim lingering from the time of the 2000–2001 California Energy Crisis.

Other cogeneration plants on the Midway-Sunset field include the Dome Project by Nuevo Energy (now Plains Exploration & Production); Aera Energy LLC; Midset Cogeneration; the Arco Oxford plant near Fellows; a Chevron plant in the hills south of Taft; the M.H. Whittier plant east of Taft; and the Monarch, Berry Petroleum, and Chalk Cliff Cogeneration plants between Maricopa and Taft.

== Production history and future potential ==
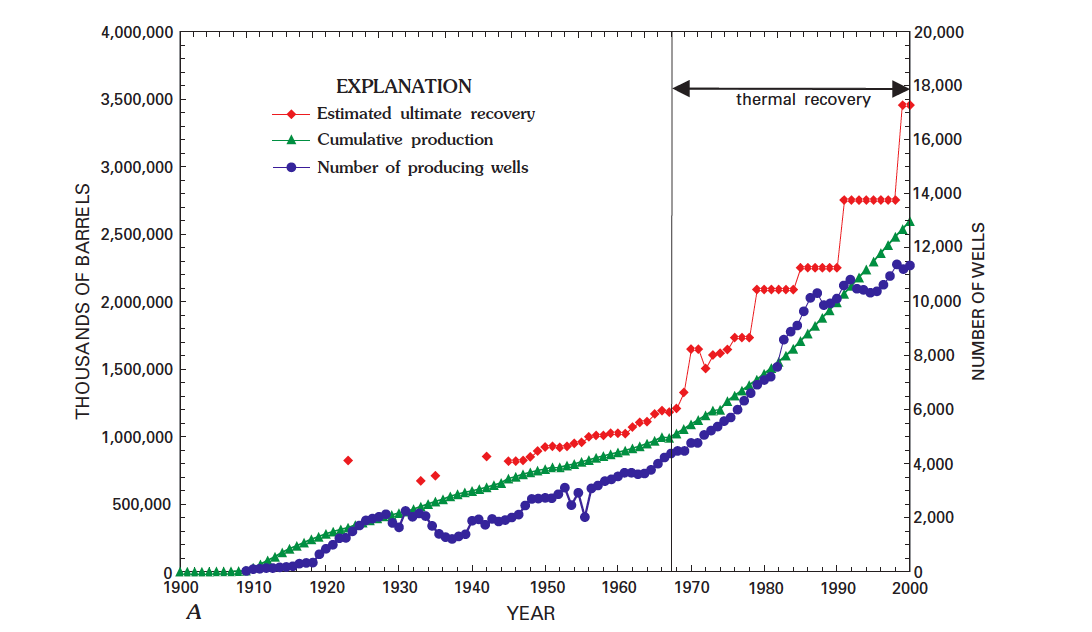
Midway-Sunset oilfield estimated ultimate recovery and cumulative production, 1900–2000.

The Midway-Sunset field continued as California's top producing field in 2012, with 29.3 million barrels (4,660,000 m^{3}) produced, down from 30.6 million barrels (4,870,000 m^{3}) in 2011.

The estimated ultimate size of the Midway-Sunset oilfield resource has been repeatedly raised during its more than 120 years of production. The first published estimate of its size was just under 1,000 million barrels (160,000,000 m^{3}) in the 1930s. New reservoirs continued to be discovered into the 1950s. In the early 1960s, operators began pilot cyclic steam injection, which proved successful, and steam flooding in the 1960s and 70s worked even better. Reserves were revised upward repeatedly beginning in the late 1960s (see chart, left). An upward revision in 1991 of 500 million barrels (79,000,000 m^{3}) of oil was followed in 1999 by another jump in reserves of more than 700 million barrels (110,000,000 m^{3}). From 1988 to 1998, about 80 percent of the oil produced at Midway-Sunset (477 million barrels (75,800,000 m^{3}) of 600 million barrels (95,000,000 m^{3}) produced) was "incremental" production attributable to enhanced recovery. It seems likely that additional reserve additions can be made, if operators are successful in further improving enhanced oil recovery techniques.

== Estimated conventional oil reserves ==
Through the end of 2009, 2,500 million barrels (400,000,000 m^{3}) of oil had been extracted from the field, leaving an estimated 576 million barrels (91,600,000 m^{3}) of recoverable oil remaining. The remaining oil amounted to 17% of California's total estimated reserve of 3.0 billion barrels (480,000,000 m^{3}).
