= Keyera =

Canadian midstream oil and gas operator

Keyera Corp.
- Type: Public
- Traded as: TSX: KEY
- Industry: Oil and gas Midstream
- Founded: 1998
- Headquarters: Calgary, Alberta, Canada
- Area served: Canada; United States
- Key people: Dean Setoguchi (CEO)
- Products: propane, ethane, butane, condensate, iso-octane
- Services: Pipeline transport Storage
- Revenue: ▼CA$6.854 billion (2025)
- Net income: ▼CA$0.432 billion (2025)
- Total assets: ▲CA$13.052 billion (2025)
- Total equity: ▼CA$2.764 billion (2025)
- Number of employees: 1,257 (2025)
- Website: www.keyera.com

Keyera (TSX: KEY) is one of the largest midstream oil and gas operators in Canada. The company services oil and gas producers in Western Canada and transports natural gas liquids such as propane, ethane, butane, condensate and iso-octane to markets throughout North America. Keyera provides major oil producers with essential services by providing them with the means to store, fractionate, and transport various oil, gas and NGL products. The company operates an industry leading condensate system. It operates the largest iso-octane manufacturing plant in the world.

Most of Keyera's facilities are located in western Canada west of the fifth meridian in the Western Canadian Sedimentary Basin where natural gas is rich with valuable liquids products. Additionally there are 2 major terminals in Oklahoma. Keyera's has two integrated business lines: the Gathering and Processing business unit which in 2021 accounted for 11% of the company's total revenue, and the NGL Infrastructure and Marketing business lines, which in 2021 accounted for 11% and 78% of the company's sales. In 2021 the company processed and sold 200,500 barrels of oil per day.

== History ==
Keyera was founded in 1998 when Gulf Canada Resources Limited sold a 50% interest in its midstream division to a subsidiary of KeySpan Corporation, forming a partnership with the company. After Gulf sold its remaining interests in the midstream sector and the partnership, the company renamed KeySpan Energy Canada Partnership.

In 2003 Keyspan Facilities Income Fund, the predecessor to Keyera Corp., was formed as an unincorporated open-ended trust under the laws of the Province of Alberta. Units of the Fund began trading on the Toronto Stock Exchange under the trading symbol KEY.UN on May 30, 2003. A second public offering was completed in April 2004. The Fund completed a third public offering of 10.72 million units and $100 million of convertible debentures (KEY.DB). The proceeds of this offering were used to fund a portion of the purchase price associated with the acquisition of EnerPro Midstream Company from Chevron Canada Resources.

On December 2, 2004 the Fund purchased KeySpan Corporation's remaining interest in the operating partnership resulting in the operating partnership becoming a wholly owned subsidiary of the Fund. With KeySpan Corporation no longer holding an ownership interest in the operating partnership, the Fund and its subsidiaries changed their name from KeySpan to Keyera. The name Keyera was selected because it captured the two important aspects of the Fund's evolution and vision for its business: Key Facilities for a New Era. On February 2, 2005, Keyspan Facilities Income Fund became Keyera Facilities Income Fund.

Effective January 1, 2011, in response to changes in tax laws, the Fund completed its most significant internal reorganization - its conversion to a corporation. The conversion was completed pursuant to a plan of arrangement that was approved by unitholders of the Fund on May 11, 2010.

== Business and operating units ==
Keyera has interests in 19 gas plants in western Canada and over 4,500 km of pipelines, thereby making it the largest gas processor in Alberta.

- Alberta EnviroFuels (AEF) facility is the largest iso-octane manufacturing plant in the world.
- 30,000 bpd De-ethanizer plant in Fort Saskatchewan, Alberta.
- also produces propane, butane, condensate and iso-octane

Keyera's natural gas processing plants span the province of Alberta, primarily in the Foothills and North Central regions of the province. It also has one gas processing plant, Caribou, in northeast British Columbia. The company's natural gas liquids transportation, fractionation, storage infrastructure is primarily located in the Edmonton/Fort Saskatchewan region of the province, one of the energy industry's central hubs for services and infrastructure.

Demand for Keyera's services continues as oil and gas producers remain focused on drilling liquids-rich gas in the Western Canada Sedimentary Basin and developing the oil sands. Natural gas producers require significant infrastructure to support growing natural gas drilling activity, and bitumen producers require diluent handling and other logistics services to serve their needs.
