= Midway Field Well 2-6 =

California Historical Landmark

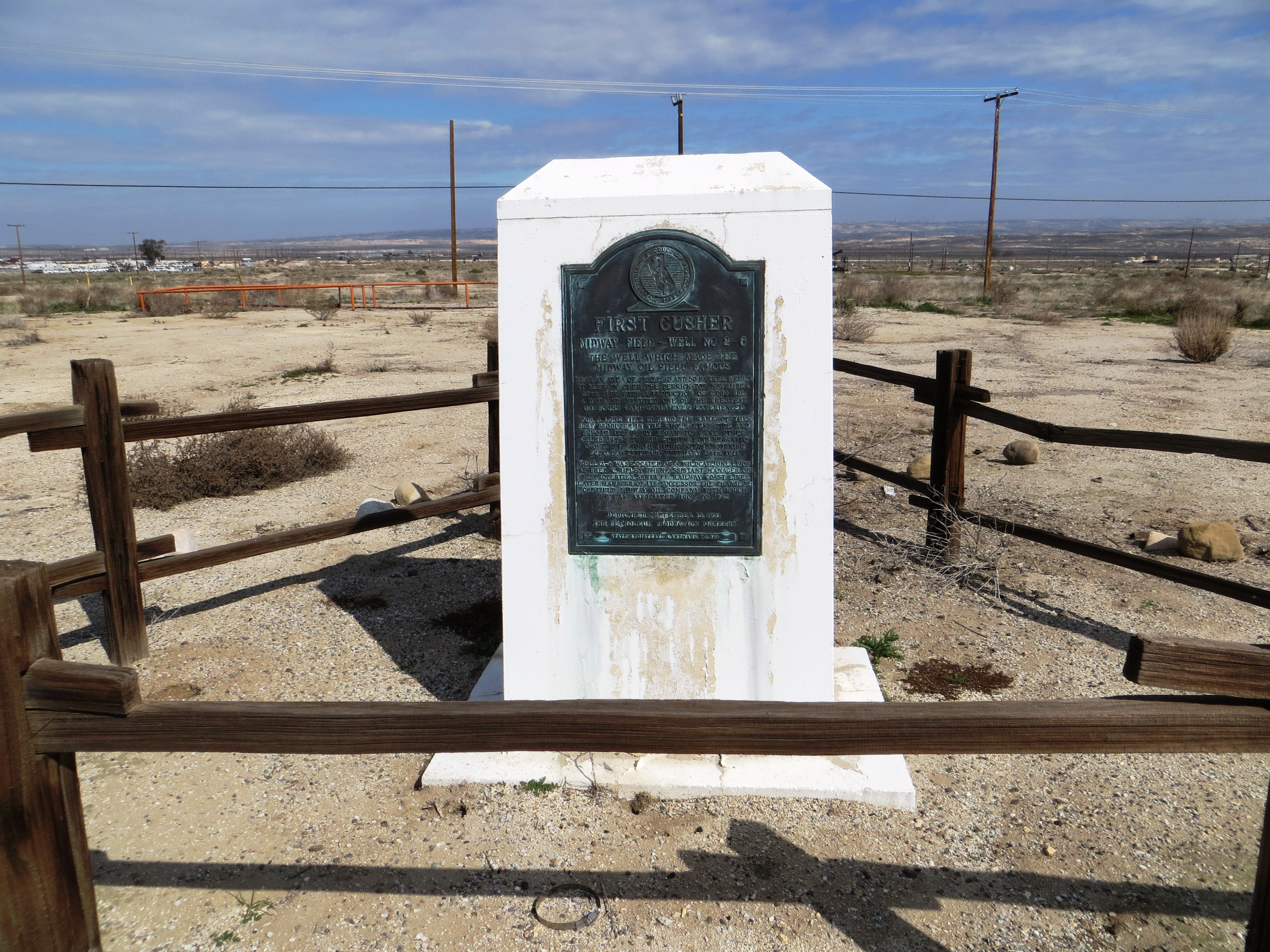
- Midway Field Well 2-6 First Gusher marker
- Location: Mocal Road, Fellows, California in Kern County
- Coordinates: 35°10′47″N 119°32′56″W

California Historical Landmark
- Official name: Midway Field Well 2-6
- Designated: May 1, 1957
- Reference no.: 581

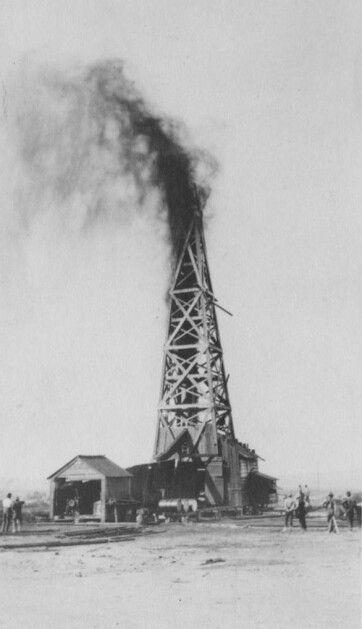
:Well 2–6 in 1909.jpg

The Midway Field Well 2-6 is California Historical Landmark number 581, in Kern County, California. The oil well is the first gusher in Kern County and hit oil in 1909. Midway Field Well 2-6 helped start the great oil boom in California, located in the Midway-Sunset Oil Field. The oil well became California State Historical Landmark No. 581 on May 1, 1957. The well is located on Mocal Road, Fellows, California. The well was built by Fred C. Ripley. Fellows is a small town 33 miles west of Bakersfield, California.

First worked for Fred C. Ripley who was working for Santa Fe Railway coast lines as the assistant manager of oil properties. He changed jobs and in 1904 became the manager the Chanslor-Canfield Midway Oil Company until 1947.

- California State Historical Landmark reads:

NO. 581 WELL, 2-6 - Near an area of small 40- and 50-barrel wells, it blew in over the derrick top November 27, 1909, with a production of 2,000 barrels a day and started one of the greatest oil booms California ever experienced. Well 2-6 was located as a wildcat, on June 1, 1909 by Fred C. Ripley.

== See also ==
- California Historical Landmarks in Kern County
- California Historical Landmark
