= Cymric Oil Field =

Oil field in Kern County, California, United States

Coordinates: 35.3683°N 119.6896°W

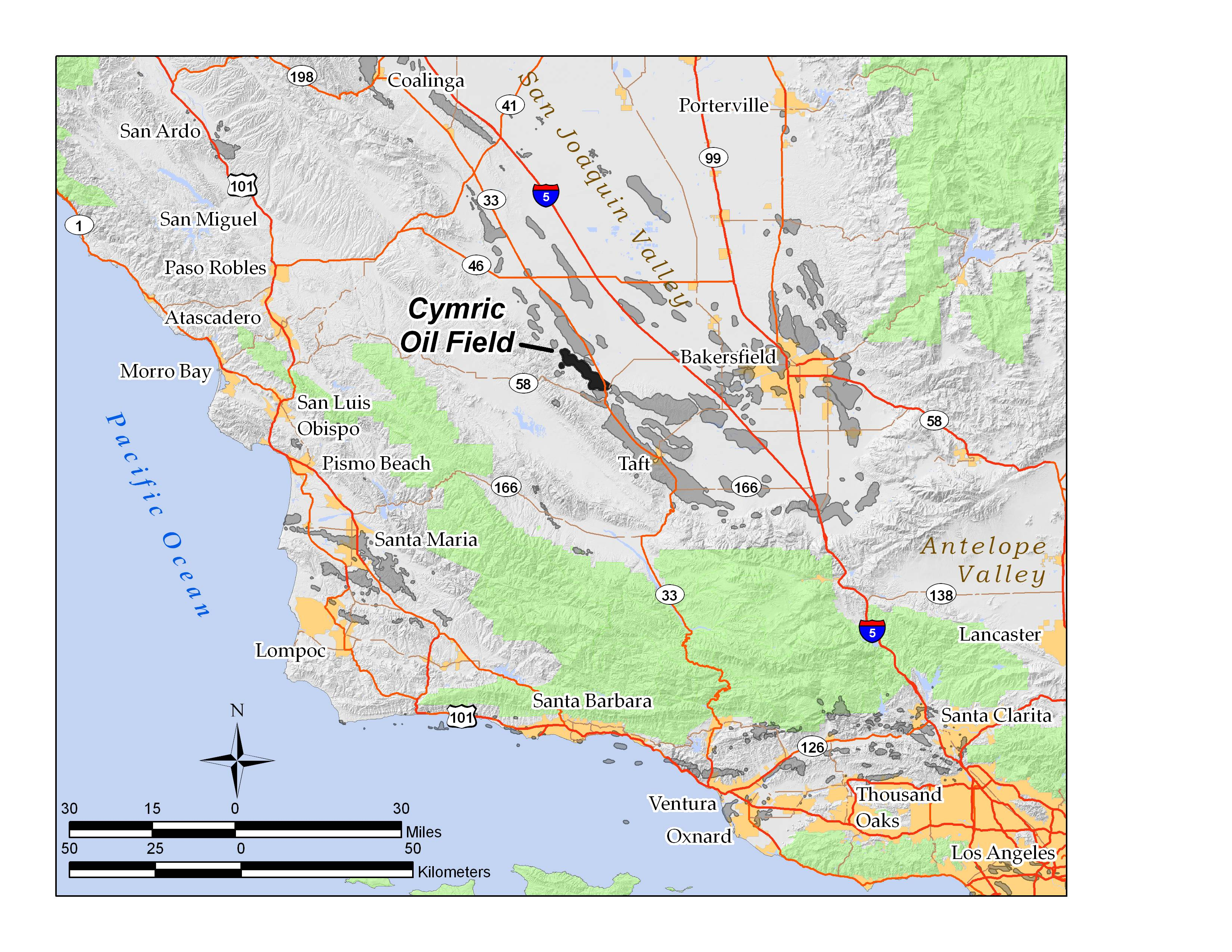
The Cymric Oil Field in Southern and Central California. Other oil fields are shown in gray.

The Cymric Oil Field is a large oil field in Kern County, California, in the United States. While only the 14th-largest oil field in California in total size, in terms of total remaining reserves it ranks fifth, with the equivalent of over 119 million barrels (18,900,000 m^{3}) still in the ground. Production at Cymric has been increasing faster than at any other California oil field.

== Setting ==
The Cymric field is in the Temblor Valley, along the west side of State Route 33, between that highway and the Temblor Range. It is north of the town of McKittrick, which is at the junction of State Route 58 and 33. The field is approximately 11 miles (18 km) long, from northwest to southeast, and up to 2 miles (3.2 km) across, including several smaller discontiguous areas which are considered geologically to be part of the main field. Elevations on the field range from approximately 600 to 1,000 feet (180 to 300 m).

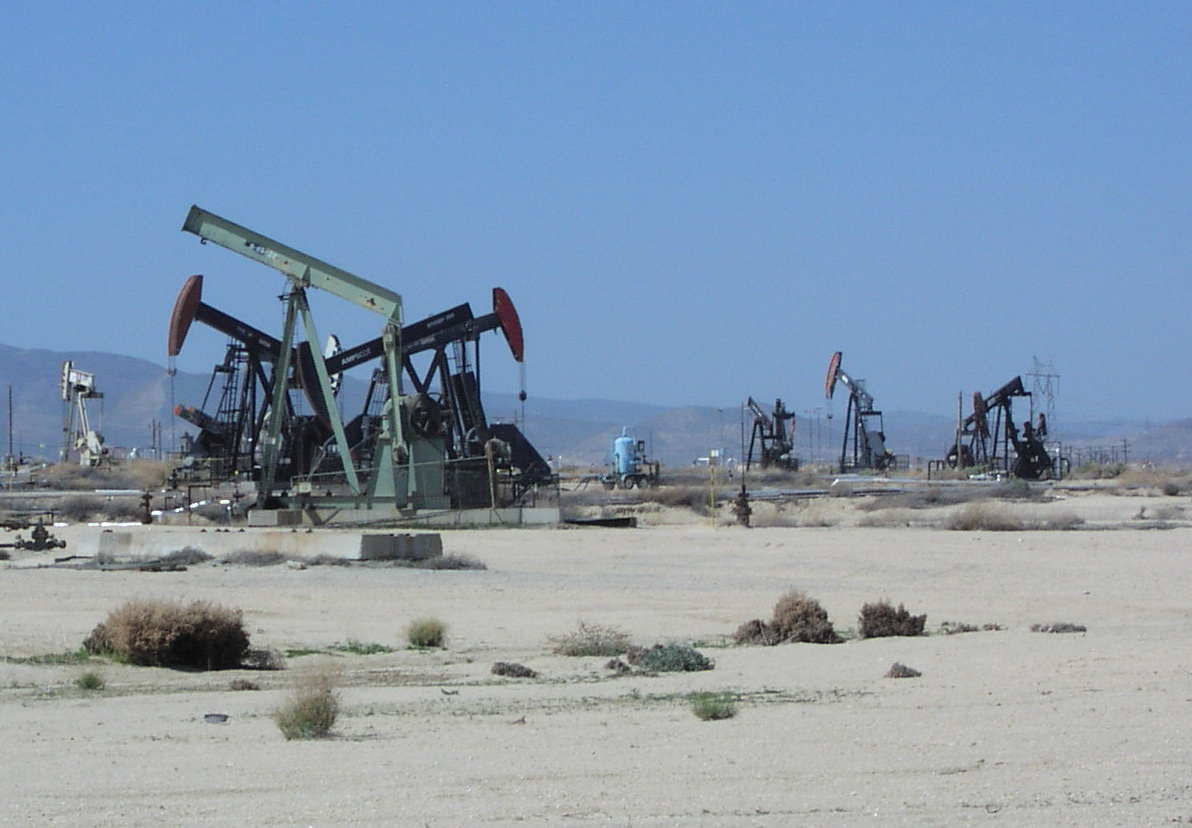
Oil field operations at Cymric, including several nodding donkey oil wells. Most vegetation has been removed from the area of active operations.

Adjacent to the Cymric Field on the south are the smaller fields of McKittrick, Belgian Anticline and Railroad Gap, and on the east, along Route 33, is the small Monument Junction field. The enormous South Belridge Field, one of the largest in California, begins about 1 mile (1.6 km) northeast of Cymric's northernmost extent.

The local climate is arid to semi-arid, and the predominant native groundcover is grassland and low scrub. In many areas of active oil field development, almost all vegetation has been removed.

== Geology ==
Most of the oil in the Cymric field is in a sandstone formation known as the Tulare, which is divided into three units: the Tulare I, II, and Amnicola. All are of Pleistocene age. The Tulare formation was created mainly in a braided stream and fan delta depositional environment, while the depositional characteristics of the Amnicola suggest a lacustrine (lake) environment, as well as braided stream. These kinds of rocks have high porosity (around 35%) but low permeability, allowing considerable oil to accumulate in the formation, while a combination of structural and stratigraphic traps keep the oil from migrating further upward. Throughout the history of the field, these upper units have been the most productive, and they were also the first to be discovered, in 1909.

Other productive units include the Etchegoin, of Pliocene age (this same unit is productive in many oil fields in the southwestern San Joaquin Valley); the Reef Ridge Formation, of Miocene age; the McDonald/Devilwater pool in the Monterey Formation, of Miocene age; the Agua (Santos) pool in the Temblor formation, of Oligocene age; and the Kreyenhagen Formation, of Eocene age. One of the most productive pools of all, the Carneros pool in the Temblor Formation, was not discovered until 1946, but it reached its peak production just one year later, with over 2,300,000 barrels (370,000 m^{3}) produced during that year from that pool alone.

Many of the pools, especially in the deeper units, were not found until the 1940s to the 1980s. Some are small and disconnected, trapped by faulting and impermeable units, often at considerable depth; for example, the Phacoides pool in the Temblor Formation is at 10,145 feet (3,092 m) below ground surface, and the field operators did not find it until 1967. Oil from this unit, coming from so deep in the earth, emerges at the spectacular and dangerous temperature of 307 °F (153 °C). The deepest well in the entire Cymric field was one drilled by the Superior Oil Company, to a depth of 12,022 feet (3,664 m), into the Point of Rocks formation, of Eocene age.

== History and production ==
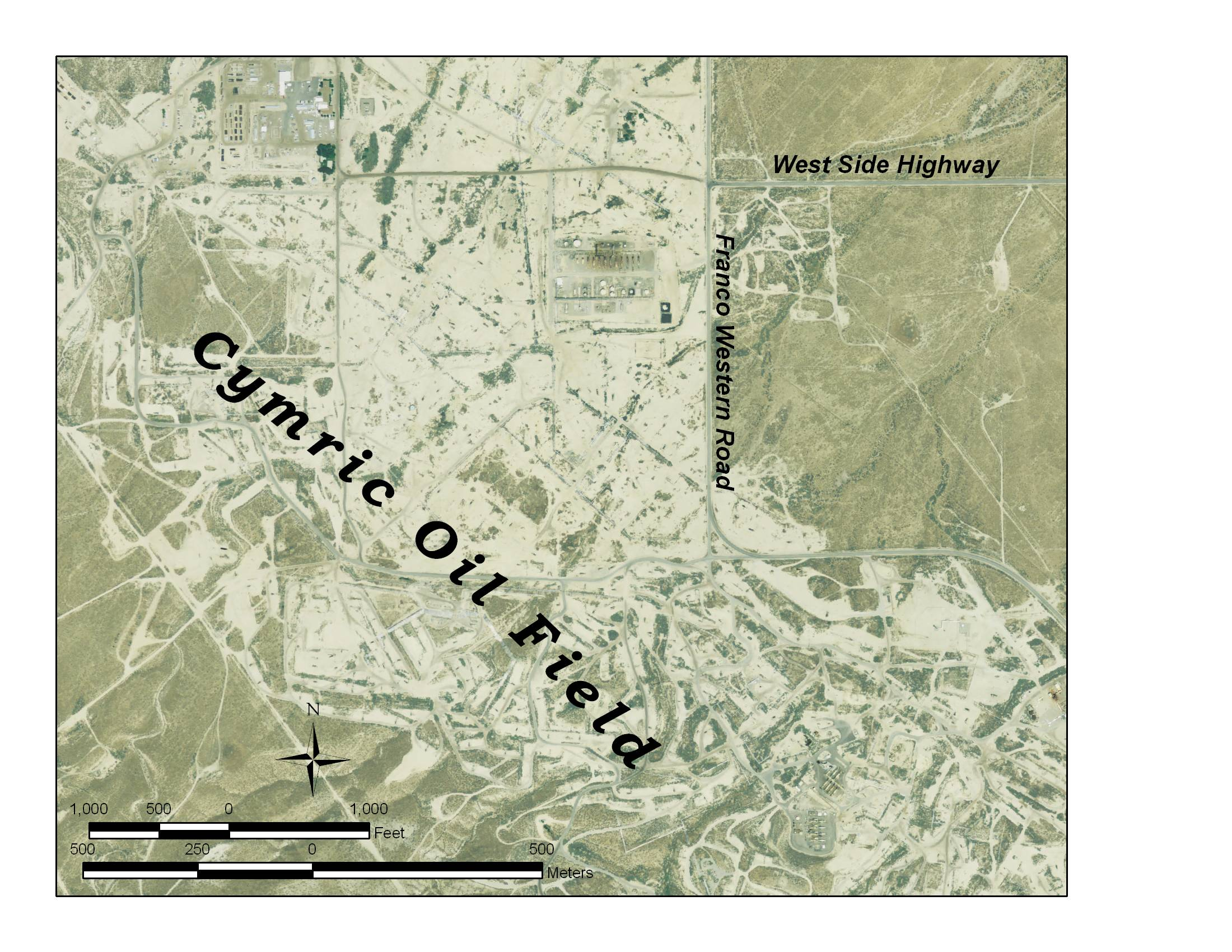
Aerial photograph of central operations area at Cymric (2005)

The Nacirema Oil Company discovered the Cymric field in 1909, when they drilled into the huge Tulare pool with their Well No. 1. Unusual for San Joaquin Valley oil fields, peak production for Cymric did not occur early in the 20th century; but rather in 1996 with 11,673,403 barrels (1,855,922.8 m^{3}). In 2006, the most recent year for which data was available, it had the fastest-growing production of any field in California.

Oil produced at Cymric is predominantly heavy crude, with specific gravity around 11-15 API. Since it flows poorly, being highly viscous, much of the field is steamflooded. This combination of water and heat assists the movement of petroleum towards production wells. Production wells on the Cymric field are often closely spaced, with some parts of the oil field having wells at 110-foot (34 m) spacing (5/8 acre).

Currently, the principal operators on the field are Chevron Corp., Aera Energy LLC, and Plains Exploration and Production (PXP), which acquired former operator Nuevo Energy in 2004.
