= Plains Exploration & Production =

Defunct energy company in Houston, Texas

Plains Exploration & Production Company
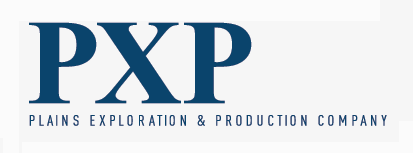
- Industry: Petroleum industry
- Founded: 2002; 24 years ago
- Defunct: May 31, 2013; 13 years ago
- Fate: Acquired by Freeport-McMoRan
- Headquarters: Houston, Texas
- Key people: James C. Flores, Chairman, President & CEO; Winston M. Talbert, CFO; The principals are D Martin Phillips, J Taft Symonds, John F Wombwell, John T Raymond, Marc A Hensel, Robert V Sinnott, Stephen A Thorington, William C O'malley, and William H Hitchcock, all from Houston TX.
- Products: Petroleum; Natural gas
- Revenue: ▲$2.565 billion (2012)
- Operating income: ▲$1.949 billion (2012)
- Net income: ▲$0.306 billion (2012)
- Total assets: ▲$17.298 billion (2012)
- Total equity: ▲$3.516 billion (2012)
- Number of employees: 906 (2013)

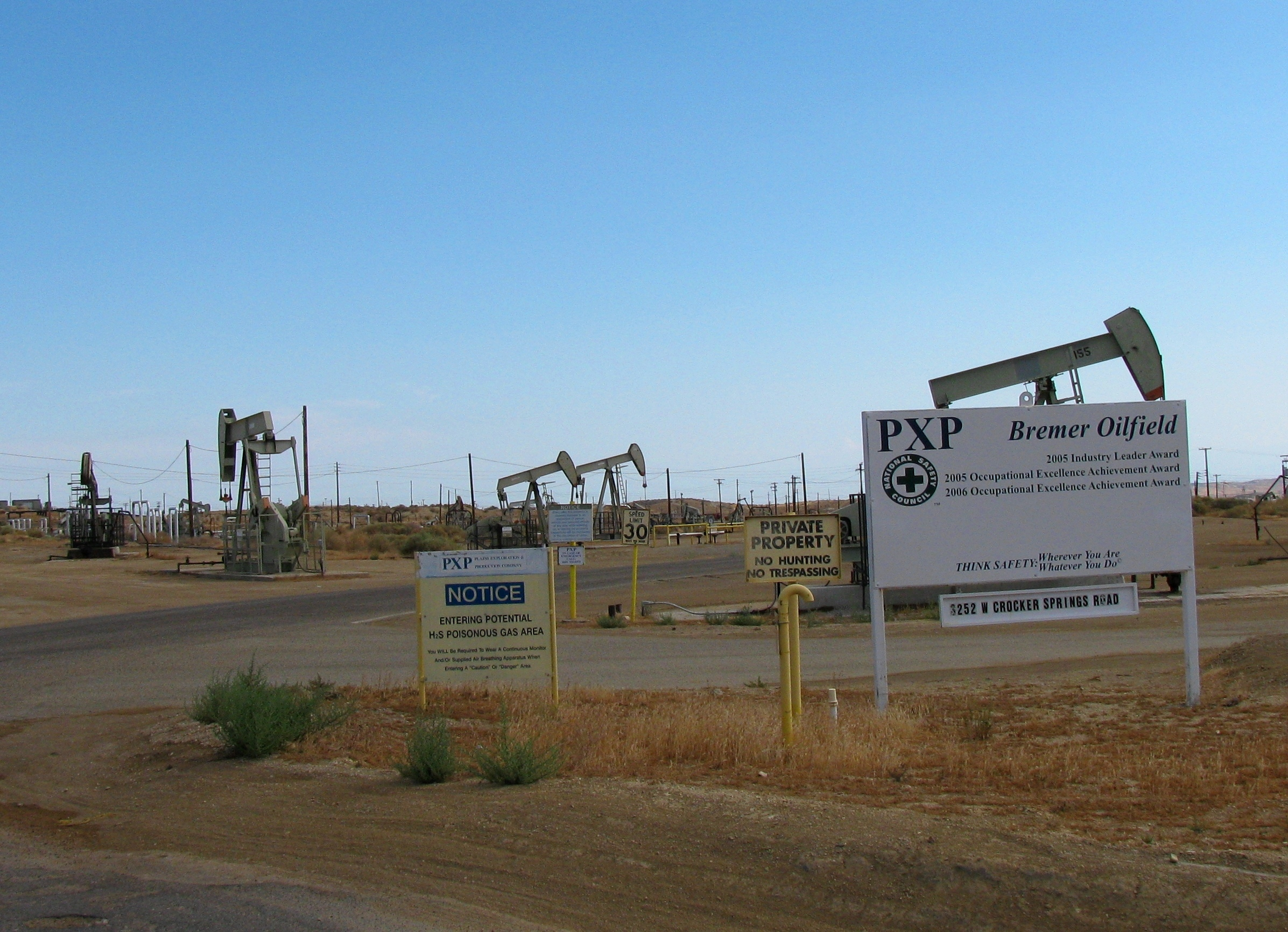
Plains operations on the Bremer Lease, Midway-Sunset Oil Field, Kern County, California

Plains Exploration & Production was a petroleum and natural gas exploration company based in Houston, Texas. In May 2013, it was acquired by Freeport-McMoRan.

== History ==
In 2002, the company was separated from Plains Resources Inc. via a corporate spin-off.

In 2003, the company acquired 3TEC for $313 million. In 2004, it and acquired Nuevo Energy for $945 million. These acquisitions gave the company petroleum-producing assets in the Southwestern United States and California.

In 2007, the company acquired Pogo Producing for $3.6 billion in cash and stock.

In 2008, the company formed a joint venture with Chesapeake Energy in the Haynesville Shale. To fund the venture, the company sold assets in the Permian Basin and the Piceance Basin to Occidental Petroleum for $1.3 billion.

In 2011, the company sold natural gas assets for $785 million, including a $600 million sale of assets in the Granite Wash to Linn Energy.

In 2012, the company acquired assets in the Gulf of Mexico from BP and Royal Dutch Shell.

== Operations ==
The company's operations were all in Wyoming, California, Texas, Louisiana, offshore of California, and in the Gulf of Mexico. The company had proved reserves of 440.4 million barrels of oil equivalent (2.694×10^{9} GJ), of which 82% was petroleum. It also had a prospect offshore of Vietnam.

In California, it was a principal operator on fields including Cymric Oil Field and the South Belridge Oil Field in Kern County and Inglewood Oil Field in Los Angeles County.

Approximately 39% of production was heavy crude oil, almost all of which was sold to Phillips 66. Valero Energy was also a major customer of the company, accounting for 17% of revenues in 2012.

=== Attempts to drill in the Tranquillon Ridge in Santa Barbara County ===
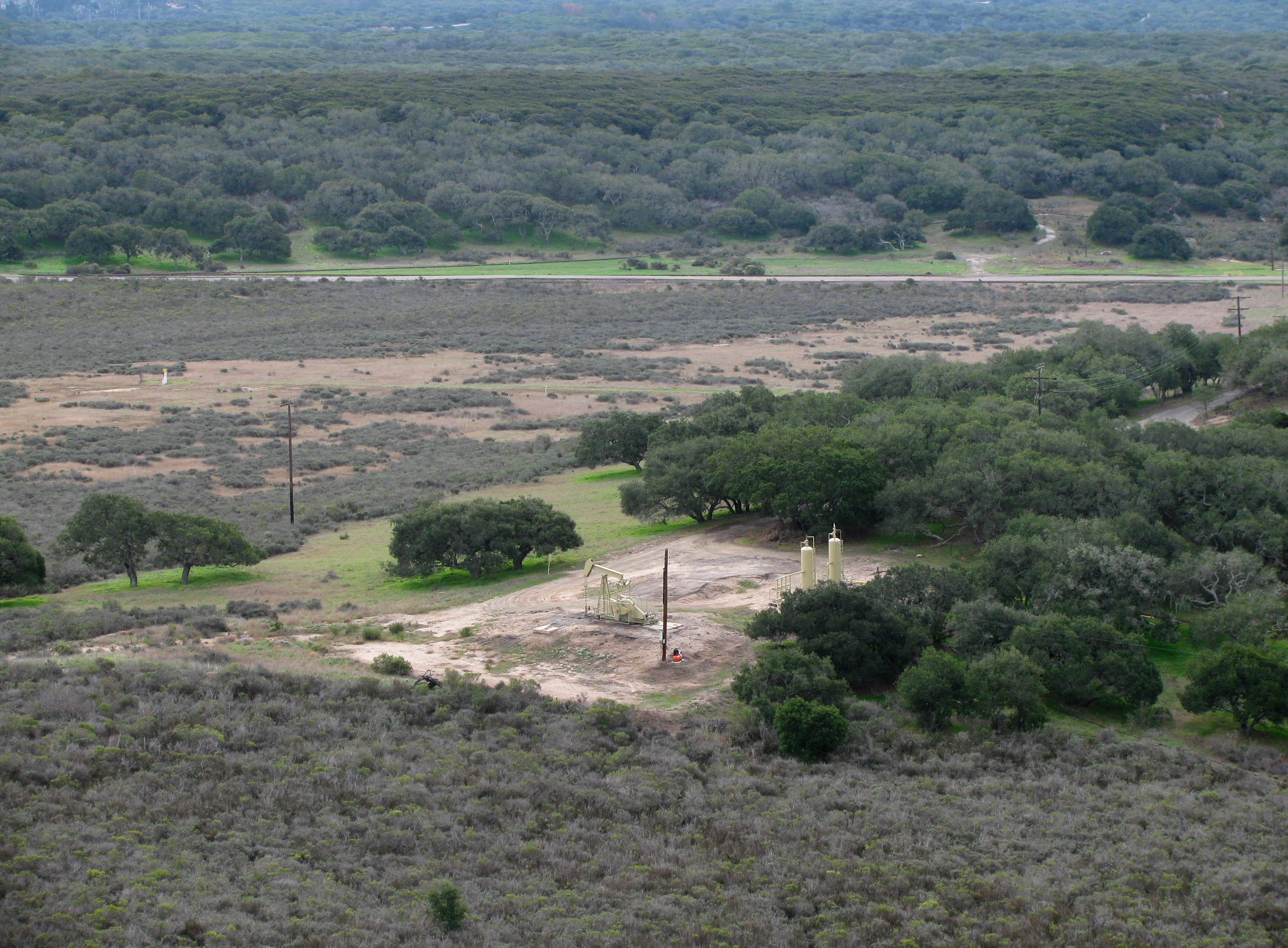
A solitary Plains pumpjack on the Lompoc Oil Field, California. Under the terms of the Tranquillon Ridge deal, this field would have been decommissioned and would have become protected open space.

The company attempted to negotiate a complex compromise deal in Santa Barbara County with environmental groups and state regulators to allow for drilling into the undeveloped Tranquillon Ridge, off the western coast of the county, in return for the company decommissioning and doing environmental restoration on the old and mostly played-out Lompoc Oil Field, which consists of approximately 3,700 acres (15 km^{2}) of ecologically-sensitive habitat adjacent to the Burton Mesa Ecological Preserve. As part of the deal, the company would have drilled into Tranquillon Ridge only from the existing Platform Irene and would have retired the platform entirely in 2022. The project would have given the state of California $2 billion and Santa Barbara County about $350 million in tax revenues during that time. The County Board of Supervisors voted to approve the project and sent it on to the State Lands Commission, which rejected it by a 2 to 1 vote on January 29, 2009, citing the unenforceability of the sunset clause. In May 2009, California Governor Arnold Schwarzenegger revived the project by including it in a revised budget proposal. However, the proposal did not pass.
