= Fellows, California =

Fellows
- Unincorporated Community; Census Designated Place
- Location in Kern County and the state of California

- Location in the United States
- Coordinates: 35°10′43″N 119°32′28″W
- Country: United States
- State: California
- County: Kern

Government
  - Senate: Shannon Grove (R)
  - Assembly: Stan Ellis (R)
  - U. S. Congress: Vince Fong (R)

Area
  - Total: 0.695 sq mi (1.801 km^{2})
  - Land: 0.695 sq mi (1.801 km^{2})
  - Water: 0 sq mi (0 km^{2}) 0%
- Elevation: 1,316 ft (401 m)

Population (2020)
  - Total: 52
  - Density: 75/sq mi (29/km^{2})
- Time zone: UTC-8 (PST)
  - Summer (DST): UTC-7 (PDT)
- ZIP code: 93224
- Area code: 661
- FIPS code: 06-23812
- GNIS feature ID: 1656513

Fellows is a census-designated place (CDP) in Kern County, California, United States. Fellows is located 5 miles (8 km) west-northwest of Taft, at an elevation of 1,316 feet (401 m). The population was 52 at the 2020 census, down from 106 at the 2010 census. Fellows is surrounded on all sides by the enormous Midway-Sunset Oil Field, the third-largest oil field in the United States, and the oil and gas industry accounts for much of the area's economic activity.

== Geography ==
Fellows is located at 35°10′43″N 119°32′28″W.

According to the United States Census Bureau, the CDP has a total area of 0.7 square miles (1.8 km^{2}), all land.

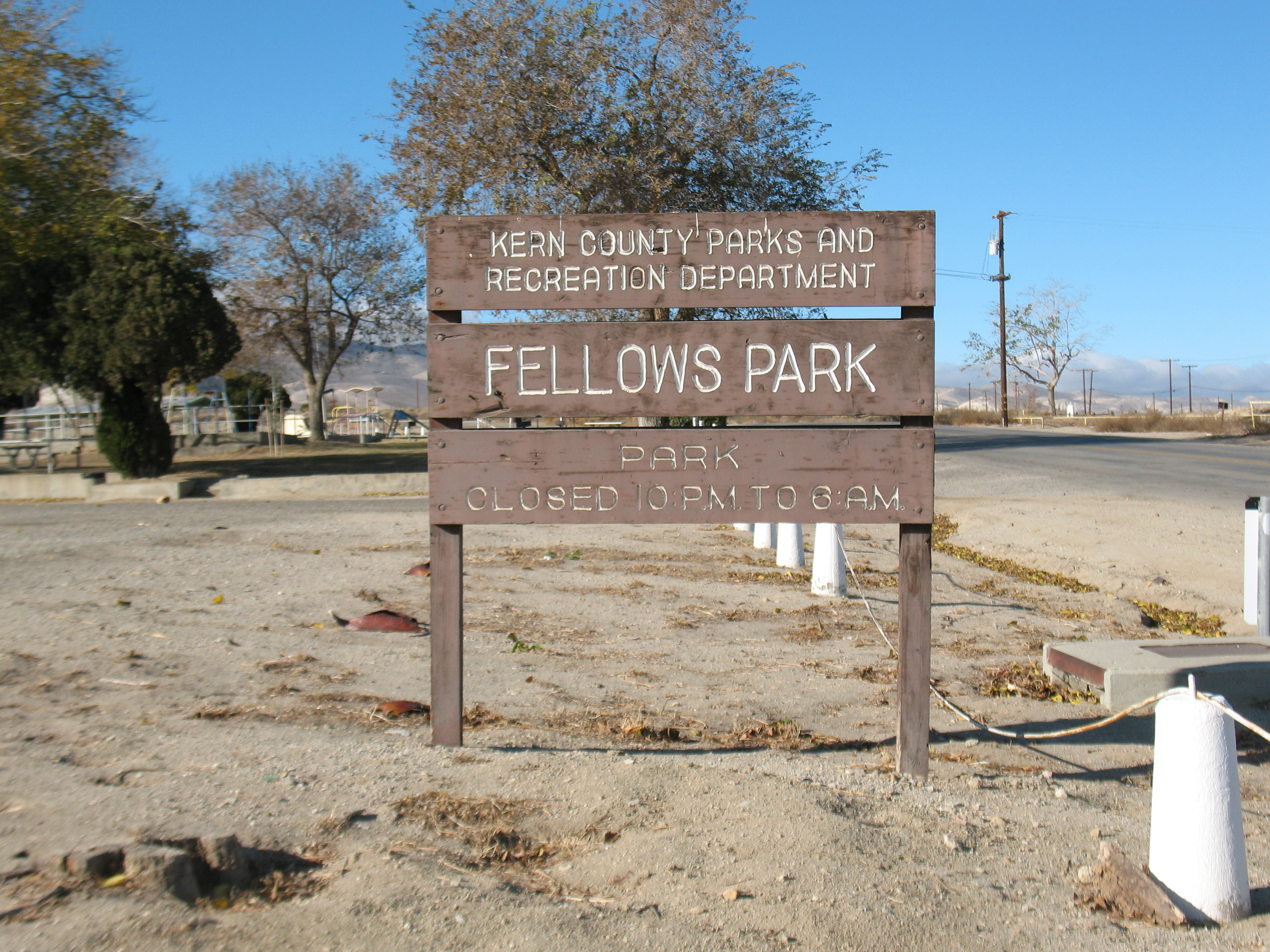
Fellows Park sign

== History ==
Fellows developed as an oil boomtown after the 1909 discovery of the Midway Gusher. The first post office at Fellows opened in 1910. The name Fellows honors Charles A. Fellows, a Sunset Western Railway contractor.

The 1969 film The Lottery, based on the short story by Shirley Jackson, was shot at Fellows. It featured a small town much like thousands of others across America holding an apparently ordinary, mundane civic event that had a cold-blooded, horrifying ending to an unfortunate victim come from out-of-nowhere. The film was ranked as one of the two bestselling educational films ever and has been widely shown in educational settings across America as an indictment against unthinking adherence to tradition and general inhumanity.

== Demographics ==
Historical population
| Census | Pop. | Note | %± |
|---|---|---|---|
| 2000 | 153 | | — |
| 2010 | 106 | | −30.7% |
| 2020 | 52 | | −50.9% |
U.S. Decennial Census; 1860–1870 1880-1890; 1900 1910 1920; 1930 1940 1950; 1960 1970 1980; 1990 2000 2010; 2020

Fellows first appeared as a census designated place in the 2000 U.S. census.

=== 2020 ===
Fellows CDP, California – Racial and ethnic composition Note: the US Census treats Hispanic/Latino as an ethnic category. This table excludes Latinos from the racial categories and assigns them to a separate category. Hispanics/Latinos may be of any race.
| Race / Ethnicity (NH = Non-Hispanic) | Pop 2000 | Pop 2010 | Pop 2020 | % 2000 | % 2010 | % 2020 |
|---|---|---|---|---|---|---|
| White alone (NH) | 126 | 88 | 46 | 82.35% | 83.02% | 88.46% |
| Black or African American alone (NH) | 0 | 1 | 0 | 0.00% | 0.94% | 0.00% |
| Native American or Alaska Native alone (NH) | 1 | 2 | 3 | 0.65% | 1.89% | 5.77% |
| Asian alone (NH) | 2 | 0 | 0 | 1.31% | 0.00% | 0.00% |
| Native Hawaiian or Pacific Islander alone (NH) | 1 | 0 | 0 | 0.65% | 0.00% | 0.00% |
| Other race alone (NH) | 0 | 0 | 0 | 0.00% | 0.00% | 0.00% |
| Mixed race or Multiracial (NH) | 1 | 4 | 2 | 0.65% | 3.77% | 3.85% |
| Hispanic or Latino (any race) | 22 | 11 | 1 | 14.38% | 10.38% | 1.92% |
| Total | 153 | 106 | 52 | 100.00% | 100.00% | 100.00% |

The 2020 United States census reported that Fellows had a population of 52. The population density was 74.8 inhabitants per square mile (28.9/km^{2}). The racial makeup of Fellows was 46 (88%) White, 3 (6%) Native American, and 3 (6%) from two or more races. Hispanic or Latino of any race was 1 person (2%).

The whole population lived in households. There were 23 households, out of which 8 (35%) had children under the age of 18 living in them, 9 (39%) were married-couple households, 3 (13%) were cohabiting couple households, 9 (39%) had a female householder with no partner present, and 2 (9%) had a male householder with no partner present. 8 households (35%) were one person, and 6 (26%) were one person aged 65 or older. The average household size was 2.26. There were 15 families (65% of all households).

The age distribution was 9 people (17%) under the age of 18, 7 people (13%) aged 18 to 24, 2 people (4%) aged 25 to 44, 20 people (38%) aged 45 to 64, and 14 people (27%) who were 65 years of age or older. The median age was 57.5 years. There were 26 males and 26 females.

There were 24 housing units at an average density of 34.5 units per square mile (13.3 units/km^{2}), of which 23 (96%) were occupied. Of these, 16 (70%) were owner-occupied, and 7 (30%) were occupied by renters.

=== 2010 ===
At the 2010 census Fellows had a population of 106. The population density was 161.5 inhabitants per square mile (62.4/km^{2}). The racial makeup of Fellows was 94 (88.7%) White, 1 (0.9%) African American, 5 (4.7%) Native American, 0 (0.0%) Asian, 0 (0.0%) Pacific Islander, 2 (1.9%) from other races, and 4 (3.8%) from two or more races. Hispanic or Latino of any race were 11 people (10.4%).

The whole population lived in households, no one lived in non-institutionalized group quarters and no one was institutionalized.

There were 37 households, 17 (45.9%) had children under the age of 18 living in them, 25 (67.6%) were opposite-sex married couples living together, 6 (16.2%) had a female householder with no husband present, 1 (2.7%) had a male householder with no wife present. There were 1 (2.7%) unmarried opposite-sex partnerships, and 0 (0%) same-sex married couples or partnerships. 4 households (10.8%) were one person and 1 (2.7%) had someone living alone who was 65 or older. The average household size was 2.86. There were 32 families (86.5% of households); the average family size was 3.06.

The age distribution was 29 people (27.4%) under the age of 18, 8 people (7.5%) aged 18 to 24, 19 people (17.9%) aged 25 to 44, 38 people (35.8%) aged 45 to 64, and 12 people (11.3%) who were 65 or older. The median age was 40.0 years. For every 100 females, there were 116.3 males. For every 100 females age 18 and over, there were 102.6 males.

There were 40 housing units at an average density of 60.9 per square mile, of the occupied units 33 (89.2%) were owner-occupied and 4 (10.8%) were rented. The homeowner vacancy rate was 2.9%; the rental vacancy rate was 0%. 91 people (85.8% of the population) lived in owner-occupied housing units and 15 people (14.2%) lived in rental housing units.

== See also ==
- Midway Field Well 2-6
- California Historical Landmarks in Kern County
- California Historical Landmark
