= Laricina Energy =

Canadian oil producing company

Laricina Energy Ltd.
- Type: Private
- Industry: Oil and gas
- Predecessor: com
- Founded: 2005
- Fate: Acquired via share purchase
- Successor: Canadian Natural Resources
- Headquarters: Calgary, Alberta, Canada
- Key people: Glen C. Schmidt, President & CEO; Jim Hand, Senior VP & COO; Derek Keller, VP Production; David Safari, VP Facilities; Marla A. Van Gelder, VP Corporate Development
- Products: Petroleum
- Number of employees: 170 (December 31, 2012)
- Website: www.laricinaenergy.com

Laricina Energy Ltd. was a private Canadian oil-producing company engaged in exploration in North-Eastern Alberta. The company targeted oil sands opportunities outside of the Athabasca mining area and was focusing on in situ plays in the Grosmont and Grand Rapids formations. Its headquarters were located in Calgary, Alberta, Canada.

== History ==
It was founded in 2005 by President and CEO Glen C. Schmidt. The company takes its name from the Latin root for the tamarack, a hardy species of tall and skinny trees that thrive on the northern fringe of tree growth in North America. Mr. Schmidt said the tamarack is known for being the first tree to arrive in an area.

Since its inception, the company has raised approximately $1.2 billion (Canadian) in equity financing and has accumulated 61,703 net hectares. A key investor is the Canada Pension Plan Investment Board (CPPIB), which invested $250 million in exchange for 17.1 per cent ownership and the right to nominate someone for election to Laricina's board of directors, as long as CPPIB maintains a 10-per-cent holding.

The company has established four main development areas in Germain, Saleski, Poplar and Conn Creek within the Athabasca oil sands region, with more than 10.2 billion barrels (1.62×10^{9} m^{3}) of estimated exploitable net bitumen. According to GLJ Petroleum Consultants in Calgary, Laricina is one of the four emerging oil sands producers with more than five billion barrels of recoverable oil resources. Laricina Energy was acquired by CNRL in September 2018 in a deal worth $46.3 million.

== Saleski Pilot ==
Saleski Pilot
- Saleski in Alberta
- Country: Canada
- Region: Northern Alberta
- Offshore/onshore: onshore
- Coordinates: 56°24′N 112°53′W
- Operator: Laricina Energy
- Partner: OSUM Oilsands

Field history
- Start of development: 2009
- Start of production: 2011

Production
- Producing formations: Grosmont Formation

In the winter of 2009 Laricina conducted a series of non-thermal test with solvents on a well in its Grosmont formation at Saleski. The test confirmed the overall capacity and quality of the bitumen reservoirs within the carbonates.

In the fall of 2010 the company completed construction of its Saleski Pilot near Wabasca, Alberta. Saleski is the world’s first Grosmont carbonate oil sands project that uses steam-assisted gravity drainage (SAGD) technology, and the first SAGD project to produce bitumen from Alberta’s Grosmont Formation, Alberta’s second-largest In situ oil sands resource. The Saleski Pilot is licensed for 1,800 barrels per day (290 m^{3}/d) of production. Steam injection started in December 2010 and first oil production was achieved in April 2011.

On July 14, 2011 Laricina Energy was selected as one of six innovative energy projects by the Alberta Government to receive funding under the Innovative Energy Technologies Program in support of its Saleski Grosmont Formation steam-assisted gravity drainage pilot.

The Saleski Pilot is unique in that it is designed to enhance industry’s proven SAGD extraction method – by combining steam with solvents, a process called solvent-cyclic SAGD or SC-SAGD. The primary objective of the Saleski Pilot is to understand the technical parameters of the reservoir in order to optimize the application of the SC-SAGD process for commercial development.

As of July 2011, Laricina is seeking regulatory approval for Phase 1 expansion at Saleski. This is the first of six potential phases of the Saleski Project’s expansion. Phase 1 is a 10,700 barrels per day (1,700 m^{3}/d) expansion that will bring the total field production to 12,500 barrels per day (1,990 m^{3}/d). Laricina is taking a staged approach to expand bitumen production capacity to 270,000 barrels per day (43,000 m^{3}/d) over a 30-year period.

In March 2013, Laricina became the first company to assign probable reserves in the Grosmont formation. The company assigned 128 million barrels of probable reserves to the first phase of its Saleski development.

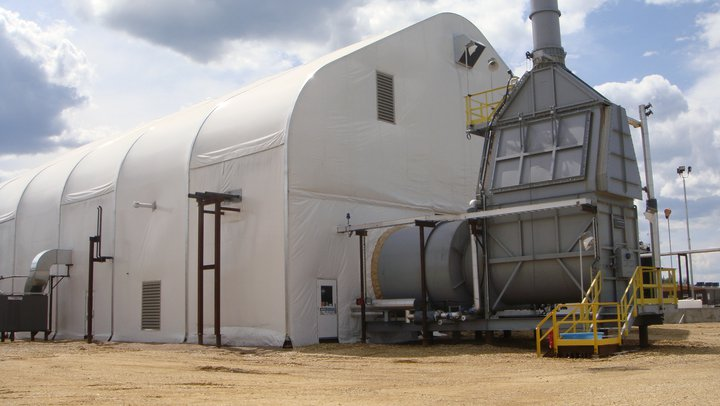
OTSG

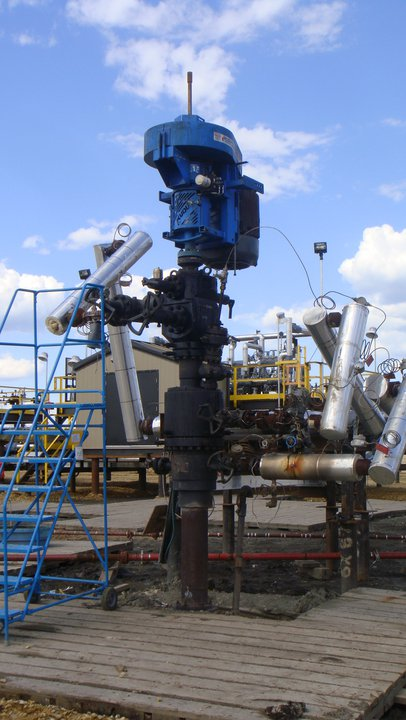
Producing Well

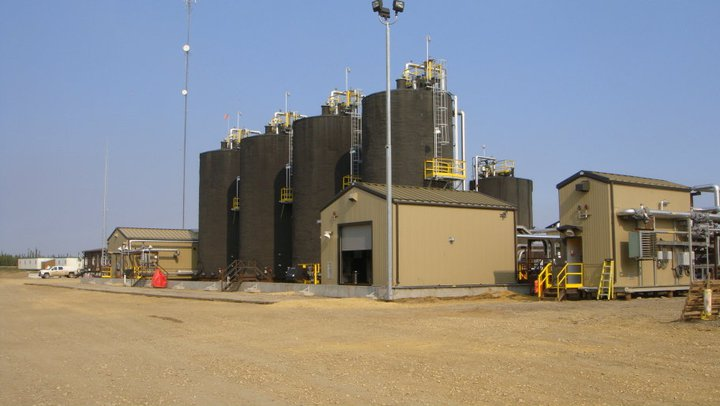
Tank Farm

== Saleski Commercial Project ==
In July 2013 Laricina received Government approval to proceed with Phase 1 of its Saleski commercial project, a $520-million project that aimed to have 12,500 barrels per day of bitumen capacity by late 2015.

== Germain Commercial Demonstration Project ==
Germain
- Germain in Alberta
- Country: Canada
- Region: Northern Alberta
- Offshore/onshore: onshore
- Coordinates: 56°21′N 113°24′W
- Operator: Laricina Energy

Field history
- Start of development: 2010
- Start of production: 2013

Production
- Producing formations: Grand Rapids Formation

In October 2011 Laricina received Order in Council approval from the Alberta Government for its Germain 5,000 bbl/d (790 m^{3}/d) Commercial Demonstration solvent-cyclic steam-assisted gravity drainage (SC-SAGD) project. The Germain project is currently under construction with first steam injection taking place in June 2013 and first bitumen production expected in the fourth quarter of 2013.

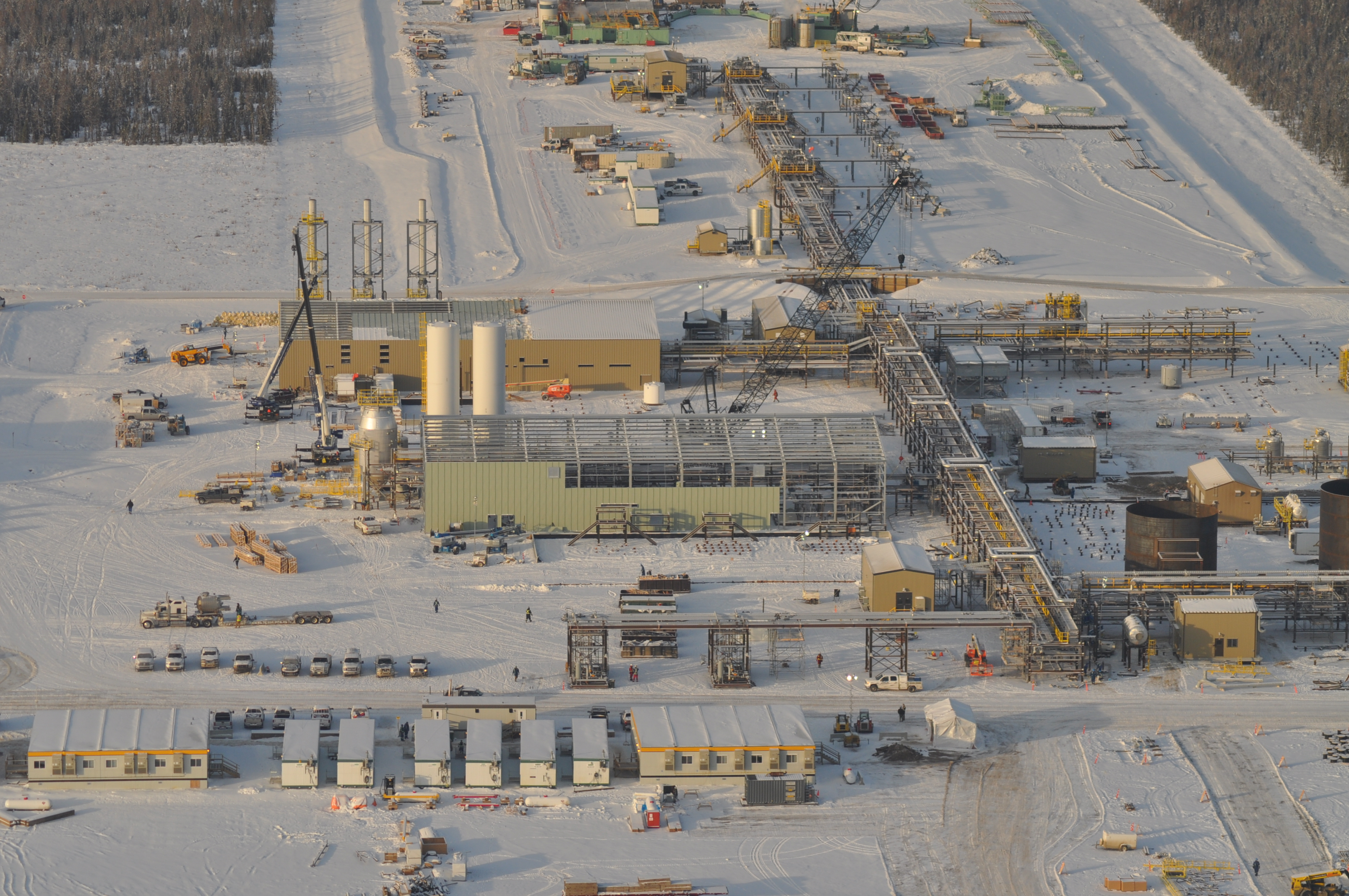
Germain Central Plant

== Stony Mountain Pipeline ==
In May 2013 Laricina received approval from the Energy Resources Conservation Board of Alberta for its Stony Mountain Pipeline in the western Athabasca oil sands region. The project will be able to carry 200,000 barrels per day of blended bitumen through a 187 km, 24 inch pipeline from Saleski to Cheecham south of Fort McMurray. The project also will have a 12 inch diluent return line with capacity of 70,000 barrels per day. A tank farm about 2 km northeast of the Saleski pilot is also planned. Laricina expects to start up the blend line in mid to late 2015 as Saleski Phase 1 commercial production begins. The company expects to receive diluent by truck until the diluent return line enters service about a year later.

== Corporate responsibility ==
The Company has established a five-year scholarship program, called the Laricina Energy Scholarships in Engineering. The scholarships provide financial assistance based on academic merit to continuing undergraduate students studying mechanical, chemical, or oil and gas engineering. Four scholarships of $3,000 each are awarded annually.

== Awards and recognitions ==
President and CEO Glen Schmidt received the 2011 Entrepreneur of the Year Award Prairies Region – Energy Development and Production at the Ernst & Young Awards Gala held in Calgary on October 18, 2011.
