= McKittrick, California =

- Unincorporated community Census designated place
- Location in Kern County and the state of California

- Location in the United States
- Coordinates: 35°18′20″N 119°37′21″W
- Country: United States
- State: California
- County: Kern

Government
  - Senate: Shannon Grove (R)
  - Assembly: Stan Ellis (R)
  - U. S. Congress: Vince Fong (R)

Area
  - Total: 2.617 sq mi (6.778 km^{2})
  - Land: 2.617 sq mi (6.778 km^{2})
  - Water: 0 sq mi (0 km^{2}) 0%
- Elevation: 1,056 ft (322 m)

Population (2020)
  - Total: 102
  - Density: 39.0/sq mi (15.0/km^{2})
- Time zone: UTC-8 (PST)
  - Summer (DST): UTC−7 (PDT)
- ZIP Code: 93251
- Area code: 661
- FIPS code: 06-44924
- GNIS feature ID: 0245709

McKittrick is an unincorporated community in Kern County, California, United States. McKittrick is 14 miles (23 km) northwest of Taft, at an elevation of 1,056 feet (322 m). The population was 102 at the 2020 census, down from 115 at the 2010 census. For statistical purposes, the United States Census Bureau has defined McKittrick as a census-designated place (CDP).

== Geography ==
McKittrick is located at the junction of State Routes 33 and 58.

According to the United States Census Bureau, the CDP has a total area of 2.6 square miles (6.7 km^{2}), all land.

The town is in the center of a large oil-producing region in western Kern County. Along State Route 33 to the south of the town is the Midway-Sunset Oil Field, the second-largest oil field in the contiguous United States; within the town itself, as well as to the west is the McKittrick Field; to the northwest is the huge Cymric Field; and along Highway 33 beyond Cymric is the large South Belridge Oil Field, run by Aera Energy LLC. East of McKittrick is Occidental Petroleum's Elk Hills Field, formerly the U.S. Naval Petroleum Reserve.

The McKittrick Tar Pits, which are similar to the more famous La Brea Tar Pits in Los Angeles, contain an assemblage of bones of ice age mammals. They are a series of surface seeps from the underlying McKittrick Oil Field.

== History ==
The first post office at McKittrick opened in 1910. The name honors Capt. William McKittrick, local landowner and rancher. McKittrick incorporated in 1911.

== Demographics ==
Historical population
| Census | Pop. | Note | %± |
|---|---|---|---|
| 2000 | 160 | | — |
| 2010 | 115 | | −28.1% |
| 2020 | 102 | | −11.3% |
U.S. Decennial Census; 1860–1870 1880-1890; 1900 1910 1920; 1930 1940 1950; 1960 1970 1980; 1990 2000 2010; 2020

McKittrick first appeared as a census designated place in the 2000 U.S. census.

=== 2020 ===
McKittrick CDP, California – Racial and ethnic composition Note: the US Census treats Hispanic/Latino as an ethnic category. This table excludes Latinos from the racial categories and assigns them to a separate category. Hispanics/Latinos may be of any race.
| Race / Ethnicity (NH = Non-Hispanic) | Pop 2000 | Pop 2010 | Pop 2020 | % 2000 | % 2010 | % 2020 |
|---|---|---|---|---|---|---|
| White alone (NH) | 141 | 99 | 67 | 88.13% | 86.09% | 65.69% |
| Black or African American alone (NH) | 0 | 1 | 1 | 0.00% | 0.87% | 0.98% |
| Native American or Alaska Native alone (NH) | 0 | 1 | 2 | 0.00% | 0.87% | 1.96% |
| Asian alone (NH) | 0 | 0 | 0 | 0.00% | 0.00% | 0.00% |
| Native Hawaiian or Pacific Islander alone (NH) | 0 | 0 | 0 | 0.00% | 0.00% | 0.00% |
| Other race alone (NH) | 0 | 0 | 0 | 0.00% | 0.00% | 0.00% |
| Mixed race or Multiracial (NH) | 3 | 5 | 7 | 1.88% | 4.35% | 6.86% |
| Hispanic or Latino (any race) | 16 | 9 | 25 | 10.00% | 7.83% | 24.51% |
| Total | 160 | 115 | 102 | 100.00% | 100.00% | 100.00% |

The 2020 United States census reported that McKittrick had a population of 102. The population density was 39.0 inhabitants per square mile (15.1/km^{2}). The racial makeup of McKittrick was 68 (66.7%) White, 1 (1.0%) African American, 2 (2.0%) Native American, 1 (1.0%) Asian, 0 (0.0%) Pacific Islander, 15 (14.7%) from other races, and 15 (14.7%) from two or more races. Hispanic or Latino of any race were 25 persons (24.5%).

The whole population lived in households. There were 38 households, out of which 10 (26.3%) had children under the age of 18 living in them, 17 (44.7%) were married-couple households, 3 (7.9%) were cohabiting couple households, 7 (18.4%) had a female householder with no partner present, and 11 (28.9%) had a male householder with no partner present. 9 households (23.7%) were one person, and 4 (10.5%) were one person aged 65 or older. The average household size was 2.68. There were 25 families (65.8% of all households).

The age distribution was 22 people (21.6%) under the age of 18, 13 people (12.7%) aged 18 to 24, 24 people (23.5%) aged 25 to 44, 26 people (25.5%) aged 45 to 64, and 17 people (16.7%) who were 65 years of age or older. The median age was 43.0 years. There were 62 males and 40 females.

There were 38 housing units at an average density of 14.5 units per square mile (5.6 units/km^{2}), which were all occupied, 27 (71.1%) by homeowners and 11 (28.9%) by renters.

=== 2010 ===
At the 2010 census McKittrick had a population of 115. The population density was 43.9 inhabitants per square mile (16.9/km^{2}). The racial makeup of McKittrick was 101 (87.8%) White, 1 (0.9%) African American, 1 (0.9%) Native American, 0 (0.0%) Asian, 0 (0.0%) Pacific Islander, 7 (6.1%) from other races, and 5 (4.3%) from two or more races. Hispanic or Latino of any race were 9 people (7.8%).

The whole population lived in households, no one lived in non-institutionalized group quarters and no one was institutionalized.

There were 42 households, 14 (33.3%) had children under the age of 18 living in them, 21 (50.0%) were opposite-sex married couples living together, 7 (16.7%) had a female householder with no husband present, 2 (4.8%) had a male householder with no wife present. There were 5 (11.9%) unmarried opposite-sex partnerships, and 0 (0%) same-sex married couples or partnerships. 9 households (21.4%) were one person and 3 (7.1%) had someone living alone who was 65 or older. The average household size was 2.74. There were 30 families (71.4% of households); the average family size was 3.07.

The age distribution was 21 people (18.3%) under the age of 18, 11 people (9.6%) aged 18 to 24, 24 people (20.9%) aged 25 to 44, 45 people (39.1%) aged 45 to 64, and 14 people (12.2%) who were 65 or older. The median age was 45.4 years. For every 100 females, there were 101.8 males. For every 100 females age 18 and over, there were 91.8 males.

There were 46 housing units at an average density of 17.6 per square mile, of the occupied units 27 (64.3%) were owner-occupied and 15 (35.7%) were rented. The homeowner vacancy rate was 0%; the rental vacancy rate was 6.3%. 80 people (69.6% of the population) lived in owner-occupied housing units and 35 people (30.4%) lived in rental housing units.

=== 2000 ===
At the 2000 census, the median household income was $43,333, and the median family income was $42,917. Males had a median income of $30,625 versus $28,750 for females. The per capita income for the CDP was $14,174. About 11.8% of families and 15.0% of the population were below the poverty line, including 21.2% of those under the age of eighteen and none of those sixty five or over.

== Photographs ==
Historic landmark sign along SR58.

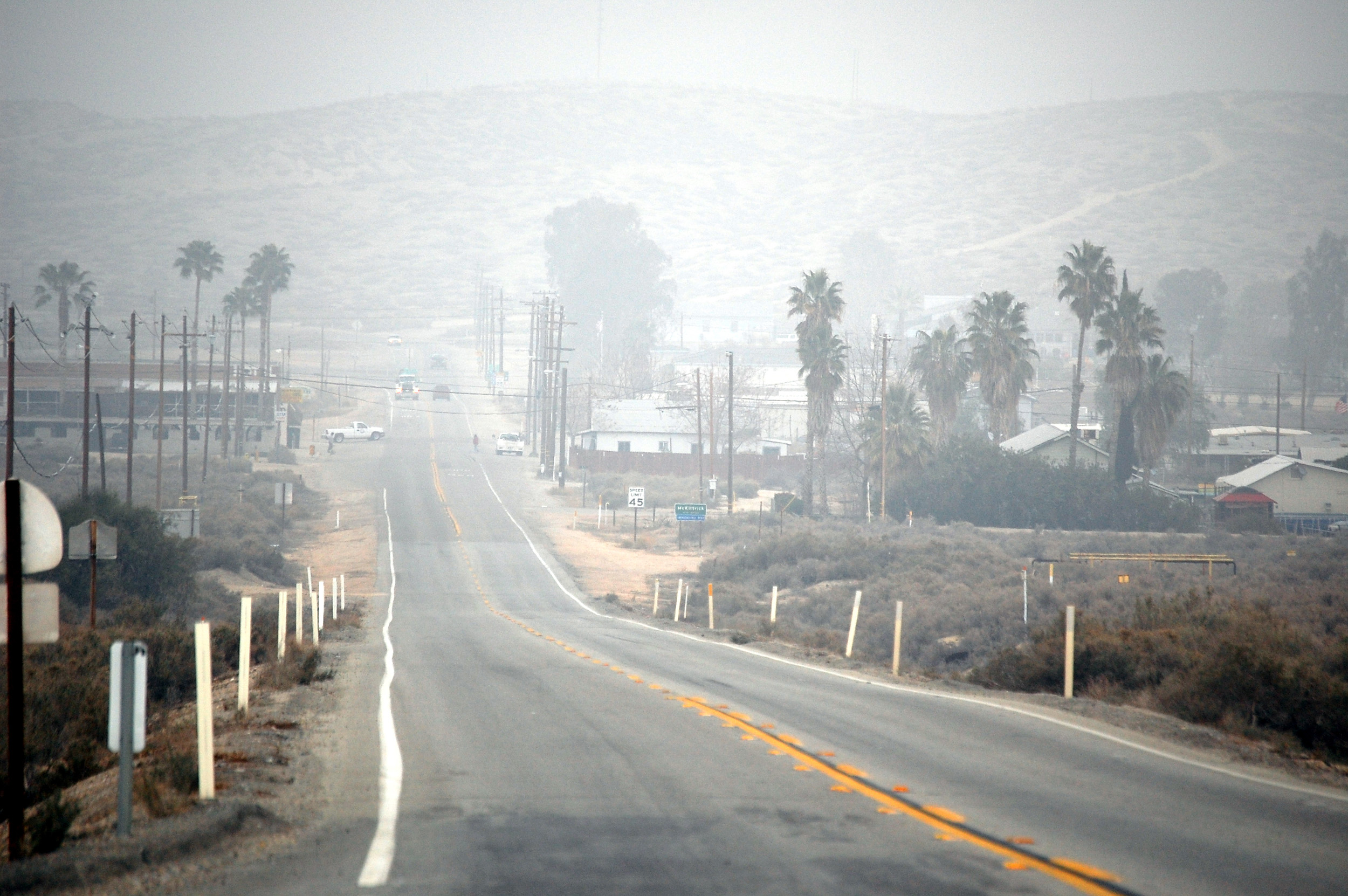
View of the community from the south.

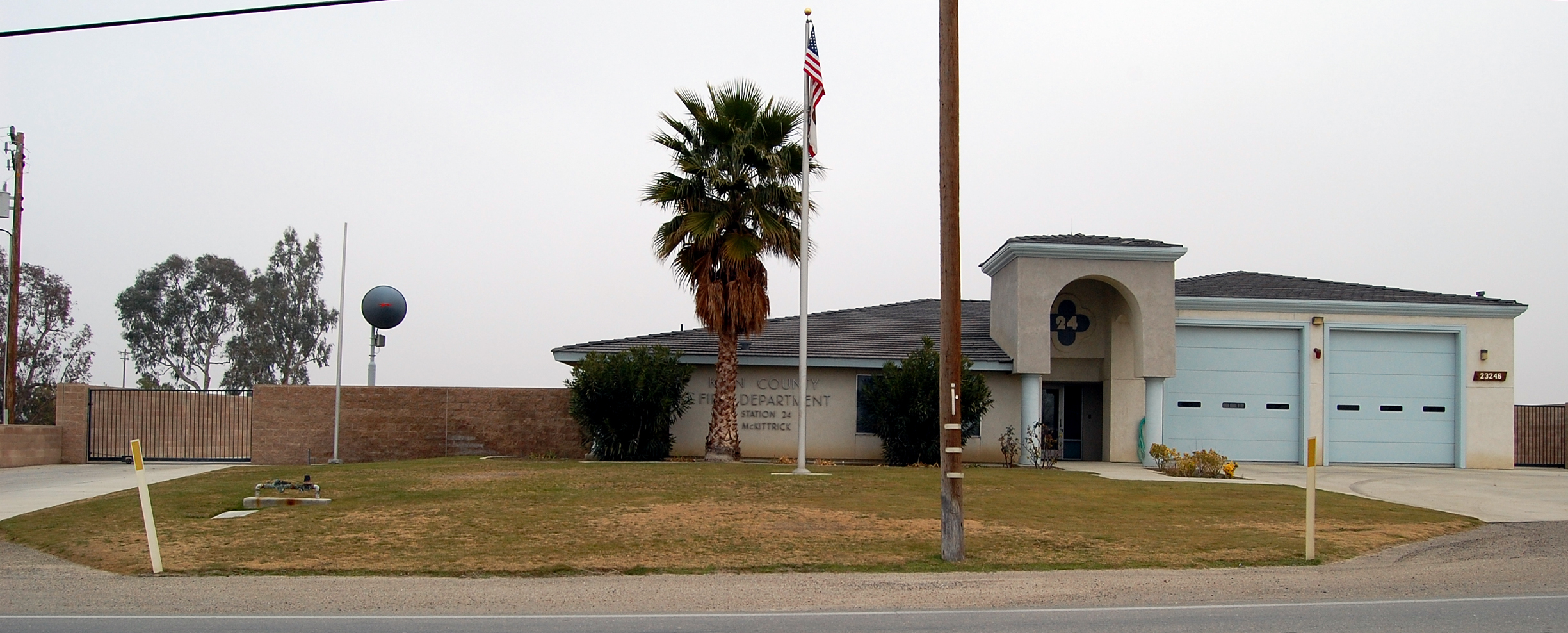
Kern County Fire Dept., Station 24.
