= Steam injection (oil industry) =

Method of extracting heavy crude oil

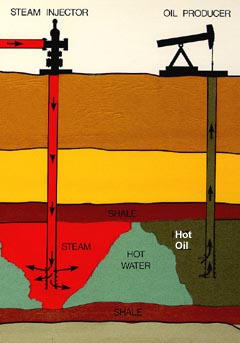
Steam is injected into many oil fields where the oil is thicker and heavier than normal crude oil. This sketch illustrates steam flooding.

Steam injection is an increasingly common method of extracting heavy crude oil. Used commercially since the 1960s, it is considered an enhanced oil recovery (EOR) method and is the main type of thermal stimulation of oil reservoirs. There are several different forms of the technology, with the two main ones being Cyclic Steam Stimulation and Steam Flooding. Both are most commonly applied to oil reservoirs, which are relatively shallow and which contain crude oils which are very viscous at the temperature of the native underground formation. Steam injection is widely used in the San Joaquin Valley of California (US), the Lake Maracaibo area of Venezuela, and the oil sands of northern Alberta, Canada.

Another contributing factor that enhances oil production during steam injection is related to near-wellbore cleanup. In this case, steam reduces the viscosity that ties paraffins and asphaltenes to the rock surfaces while steam distillation of crude oil light ends creates a small solvent bank that can miscibly remove trapped oil.

== Cyclic steam stimulation (CSS) ==
A graphical explanation of the Cyclic Steam Stimulation method

This method, also known as the Huff and Puff method, consists of 3 stages: injection, soaking, and production. Steam is first injected into a well for a certain amount of time to heat the oil in the surrounding reservoir to a recover approximately 20% of the original oil in place (OOIP), compared to steam assisted gravity drainage, which has been reported to recover over 50% of OOIP. It is quite common for wells to be produced in the cyclic steam manner for a few cycles before being put on a steam flooding regime with other wells.

The mechanism proceeds through cycles of steam injection, soak, and oil production. First, steam is injected into a well at a temperature of 300 to 340° Celsius for a period of weeks to months. Next, the well is allowed to sit for days to weeks to allow heat to soak into the formation. Finally, the hot oil is pumped out of the well for a period of weeks or months. Once the production rate falls off, the well is put through another cycle of injection, soak and production. This process is repeated until the cost of injecting steam becomes higher than the money made from producing oil. The CSS method has the advantage that recovery factors are around 20 to 25% and the disadvantage that the cost to inject steam is high.

Canadian Natural Resources use "employs cyclic steam or "huff and puff" technology to develop bitumen resources. This technology requires one well bore and the production consists of the injection and production phases. First steam is "injected for several weeks, mobilizing cold bitumen". Then the flow "on the injection well is reversed producing oil through the same injection well bore. The injection and production phases together comprise one cycle. "Steam is re-injected to begin a new cycle when oil production rates fall below a critical threshold due to the cooling of the reservoir. Artificial lift method of production may be used at this stage. After a few cycles, it may not be economical to produce by the huff and puff method. Steam flooding is then considered for further oil recovery if other conditions are favorable. It has been observed that recovery from huff and puff can be achieved up to 30% and from steam flooding recovery can be up to 50%" (CNRL 2013).

== Steam flooding ==
In a steam flood, sometimes known as a steam drive, some wells are used as steam injection wells and other wells are used for oil production. Two mechanisms are at work to improve the amount of oil recovered. The first is to heat the oil to higher temperatures and to thereby decrease its viscosity so that it more easily flows through the formation toward the producing wells. A second mechanism is the physical displacement employing in a manner similar to water flooding, in which oil is meant to be pushed to the production wells. While more steam is needed for this method than for the cyclic method, it is typically more effective at recovering a larger portion of the oil.

A form of steam flooding popular in the Alberta oil sands is steam assisted gravity drainage (SAGD), in which two horizontal wells are drilled, one a few meters above the other, and steam is injected into the upper one, reducing the bitumen's viscosity to the point where gravity will pulls it down into the producing well.

In 2011 Laricina Energy combined solvent injection with steam injection in a process called solvent cyclic steam-assisted gravity drainage (SC-SAGD) (Canadian Association of Petroleum Producers CAPP 2009). Laricina claims that combining solvents with steam reduces the overall steam oil ratio for recovery by 30%.

The alternative to surface generated steam is downhole steam generation that reduces heat loss and generates high-quality steam in the reservoir that allows for more heavy oil and oil sands production at a faster rate. Downhole steam generators were first proposed by the major oil companies in the early 1960s. Over the last 50 years multiple downhole steam technologies have been developed such as the DOE and SANDIA downhole combustion system known as Project Deep Steam that was field tested in Long Beach, CA in 1982, but was a failure. The only downhole steam generator that has proved successful is branded as eSteam.
