= Keyes, California =

Keyes
- Census-designated place
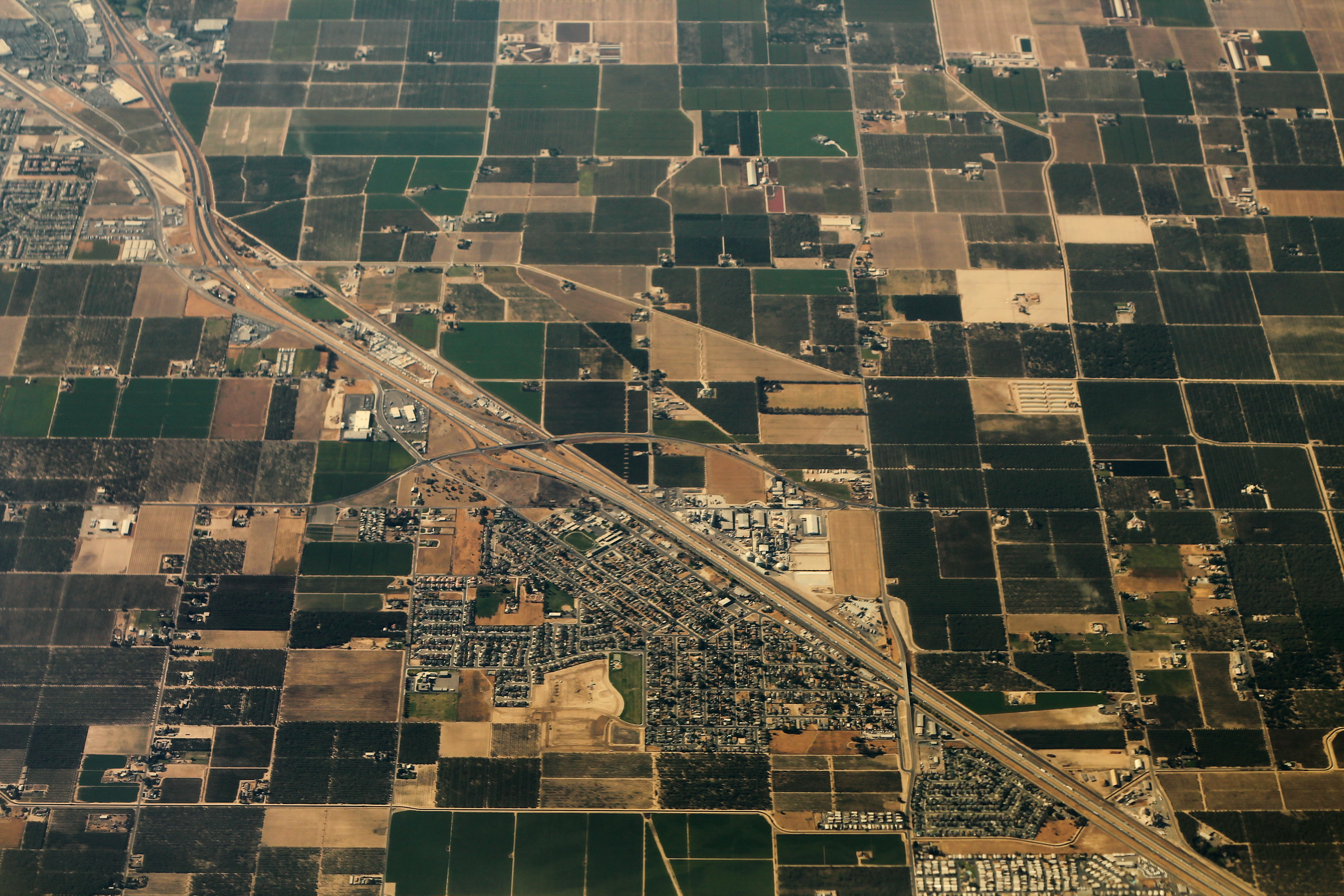
- Aerial image of Keyes

- Location in Stanislaus County and the state of California
- Coordinates: 37°33′42″N 120°55′2″W
- Country: United States
- State: California
- County: Stanislaus

Area
  - Total: 1.568 sq mi (4.061 km^{2})
  - Land: 1.568 sq mi (4.061 km^{2})
  - Water: 0 sq mi (0 km^{2}) 0%
- Elevation: 92 ft (28 m)

Population (2020)
  - Total: 5,672
  - Density: 3,617/sq mi (1,397/km^{2})
- Time zone: UTC-8 (Pacific (PST))
  - Summer (DST): UTC-7 (PDT)
- ZIP code: 95328
- Area code: 209
- FIPS code: 06-38422
- GNIS feature ID: 1656109

Keyes is a census-designated place (CDP) in Stanislaus County, California, United States. The population was 5,672 at the 2020 census, up from 5,601 at the 2010 census. It is part of the Modesto Metropolitan Statistical Area.

== Geography ==
Keyes is located at 37°33′42″N 120°55′2″W (37.561800, -120.917361).

According to the United States Census Bureau, the CDP has a total area of 1.6 square miles (4.1 km^{2}), all land.

== Demographics ==
Historical population
Census	Pop.	Note	%±
1990	2,878		—
2000	4,575		59.0%
2010	5,601		22.4%
2020	5,672		1.3%
U.S. Decennial Census; 1990 2000 2010

Keyes first appeared as a census designated place in the 1990 U.S. census.

=== 2020 census ===
As of the 2020 census, Keyes had a population of 5,672. The population density was 3,617.3 inhabitants per square mile (1,396.6/km^{2}). The median age was 32.0 years. 29.5% of residents were under the age of 18 and 9.2% of residents were 65 years of age or older. For every 100 females, there were 103.8 males, and for every 100 females age 18 and over, there were 102.5 males age 18 and over.

100.0% of residents lived in urban areas, while 0.0% lived in rural areas. The census reported that 99.8% of the population lived in households, 13 people (0.2%) lived in non-institutionalized group quarters, and no one was institutionalized.

There were 1,556 households in Keyes, of which 44.3% had children under the age of 18 living in them. Of all households, 51.5% were married-couple households, 9.1% were cohabiting-couple households, 18.6% were households with a male householder and no spouse or partner present, and 20.8% were households with a female householder and no spouse or partner present. About 16.0% of all households were made up of individuals and 7.0% had someone living alone who was 65 years of age or older. The average household size was 3.64. There were 1,233 families (79.2% of all households).

There were 1,671 housing units, of which 93.1% were occupied. Of occupied units, 68.9% were owner-occupied and 31.1% were occupied by renters. 6.9% of housing units were vacant. The homeowner vacancy rate was 1.6% and the rental vacancy rate was 6.7%.

Racial composition as of the 2020 census
Race	Number	Percent
White	2,057	36.3%
Black or African American	49	0.9%
American Indian and Alaska Native	132	2.3%
Asian	235	4.1%
Native Hawaiian and Other Pacific Islander	26	0.5%
Some other race	2,267	40.0%
Two or more races	906	16.0%
Hispanic or Latino (of any race)	3,853	67.9%

=== Demographic estimates ===
In 2023, the US Census Bureau estimated that 32.5% of the population were foreign-born. Of all people aged 5 or older, 28.0% spoke only English at home, 63.9% spoke Spanish, 5.4% spoke other Indo-European languages, and 2.6% spoke Asian or Pacific Islander languages. Of those aged 25 or older, 59.6% were high school graduates and 5.3% had a bachelor's degree.

=== Income and poverty ===
The median household income in 2023 was $59,338, and the per capita income was $19,494. About 25.3% of families and 27.5% of the population were below the poverty line.

=== 2010 census ===
At the 2010 census Keyes had a population of 5,601. The population density was 1,980.1 inhabitants per square mile (764.5/km^{2}). The racial makeup of Keyes was 3,109 (55.5%) White, 71 (1.3%) African American, 60 (1.1%) Native American, 200 (3.6%) Asian, 32 (0.6%) Pacific Islander, 1,919 (34.3%) from other races, and 210 (3.7%) from two or more races. Hispanic or Latino of any race were 3,233 persons (57.7%).

The census reported that 5,572 people (99.5% of the population) lived in households, 29 (0.5%) lived in non-institutionalized group quarters, and no one was institutionalized.

There were 1,588 households, 837 (52.7%) had children under the age of 18 living in them, 862 (54.3%) were opposite-sex married couples living together, 270 (17.0%) had a female householder with no husband present, 144 (9.1%) had a male householder with no wife present. There were 123 (7.7%) unmarried opposite-sex partnerships, and 8 (0.5%) same-sex married couples or partnerships. 235 households (14.8%) were one person and 93 (5.9%) had someone living alone who was 65 or older. The average household size was 3.51. There were 1,276 families (80.4% of households); the average family size was 3.88.

The age distribution was 1,877 people (33.5%) under the age of 18, 590 people (10.5%) aged 18 to 24, 1,517 people (27.1%) aged 25 to 44, 1,168 people (20.9%) aged 45 to 64, and 449 people (8.0%) who were 65 or older. The median age was 29.5 years. For every 100 females, there were 99.9 males. For every 100 females age 18 and over, there were 96.4 males.

There were 1,714 housing units at an average density of 605.9 per square mile, of the occupied units 1,063 (66.9%) were owner-occupied and 525 (33.1%) were rented. The homeowner vacancy rate was 3.4%; the rental vacancy rate was 6.9%. 3,622 people (64.7% of the population) lived in owner-occupied housing units and 1,950 people (34.8%) lived in rental housing units.

== Government ==
In the California State Legislature, Keyes is in the 4th senatorial district, represented by Republican Marie Alvarado-Gil, and the 22nd Assembly district, represented by Republican Juan Alanis.

In the United States House of Representatives, Gustine is in California's 13th congressional district and is represented by Democrat Adam Gray.

In 2012, a Stanislaus County Sheriff Department officer stun-gunned and shot an unarmed man.

== Keyes Fire Protection District ==
The Keyes Fire Department is an all volunteer, all risk fire department serving the community of Keyes and the surrounding areas. The department also responds to mutual aid with surrounding departments. The department has operated since 1943. The department has approximately 17 men: five captains, six engineers and six firefighters. These members train every Wednesday night and the last Saturday of each month for the day. KFPD has several pieces of apparatus that it utilizes to respond to emergencies.

Engine 40

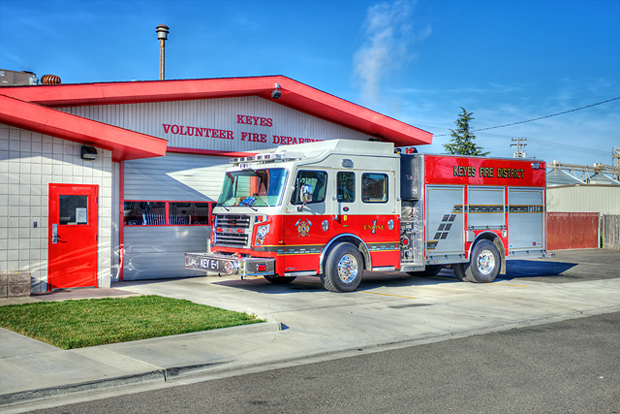
Keyes Engine 1

Engine 1 is a Rosenbauer EXT Type 1 engine. It can seat 6 people and carries 1000 gallons of water and it can pump 1500 GPM. It is the first piece of apparatus used for medical aids, vehicle accidents, rescues, and structure fires. It carries 1,000 ft. 3" supply line, 650 ft. 1-3/4", 800 ft. 2-1/2", 100 ft. 1-1/2", 25 ft. 1-1/2" It carries tools and rope for low angle rope operations, Hurst Extrication tools, stabilization tools, and airbags.

Brush 40

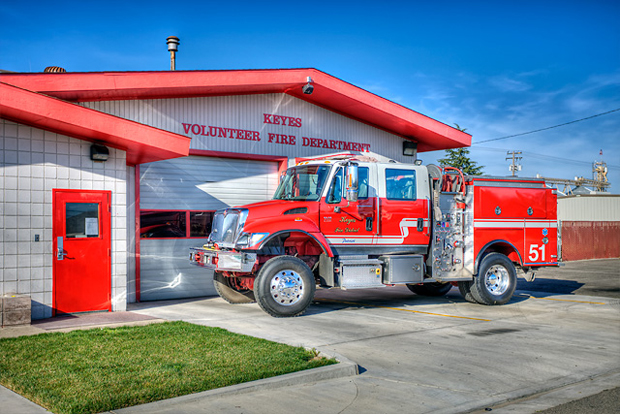
Keyes Brush 51

Brush 51 is a Westmark Navstar 7400 Type 3 brush truck. It seats 5 and carries 522 gal. of water and can pump at 500 GPM. It is the first out engine for brush fires. It carries 600 ft. of 3" supply line, 425 ft. 1-1/2", 100 ft. 1", as well as Wildland Packs

Grass 40

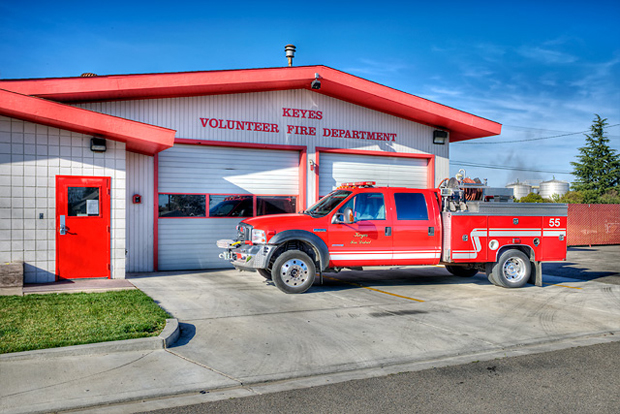
Keyes Grass 55

Grass 55 is a modified Ford F550 XL Type 6 grass rig. It carries 300 gal. of water and can pump at 200 GPM. It also carries a set of Hurst Extrication Tools. This unit carries 150' of 1" reel line, 175' of 1 1/2" hose, as well as wildland packs.

Water Tender 40

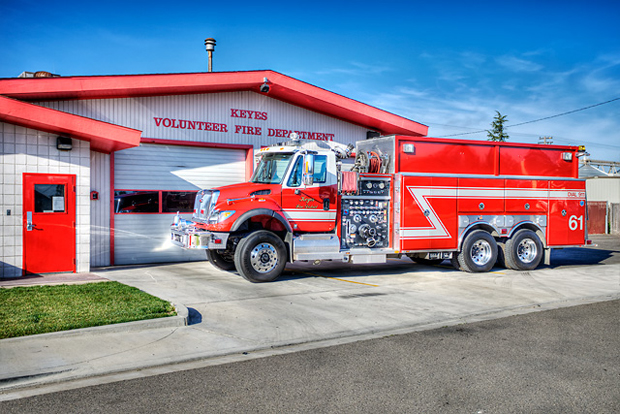
Keyes Tender 61

Tender 61 is a Ferrera International 7400 4X6 water tender. It carries 3000 gal. of water. If required, this rig could act as a pumper for fire attack with its 1250 GPM pump. It carries 500 ft. of 3" supply line, 200 ft. Reel Line, 150 ft. 1-1/2".
