= Orange blossom (disambiguation) =

An orange blossom is the flower of the orange tree.

Orange blossom may also refer to:

- Choisya, a genus of evergreen shrub
- Orange Blossom, a French electronica band
- Orange Blossom, California, an unincorporated community
- Orange Blossom Special
  - Orange Blossom Special (song), fiddle tune about the train
- Orange Blossom, a character from Strawberry Shortcake

Orange blossoms may refer to:

- Orange Blossoms (musical), a 1922 musical by Victor Herbert
- Orange Blossoms (album), a 2008 album by JJ Grey & Mofro
- 124th New York Volunteer Infantry Regiment, known as the Orange Blossoms, an American Civil War regiment
- Casa Loma Orchestra, an American swing band also known as the Orange Blossoms
