= Government of Stanislaus County, California =

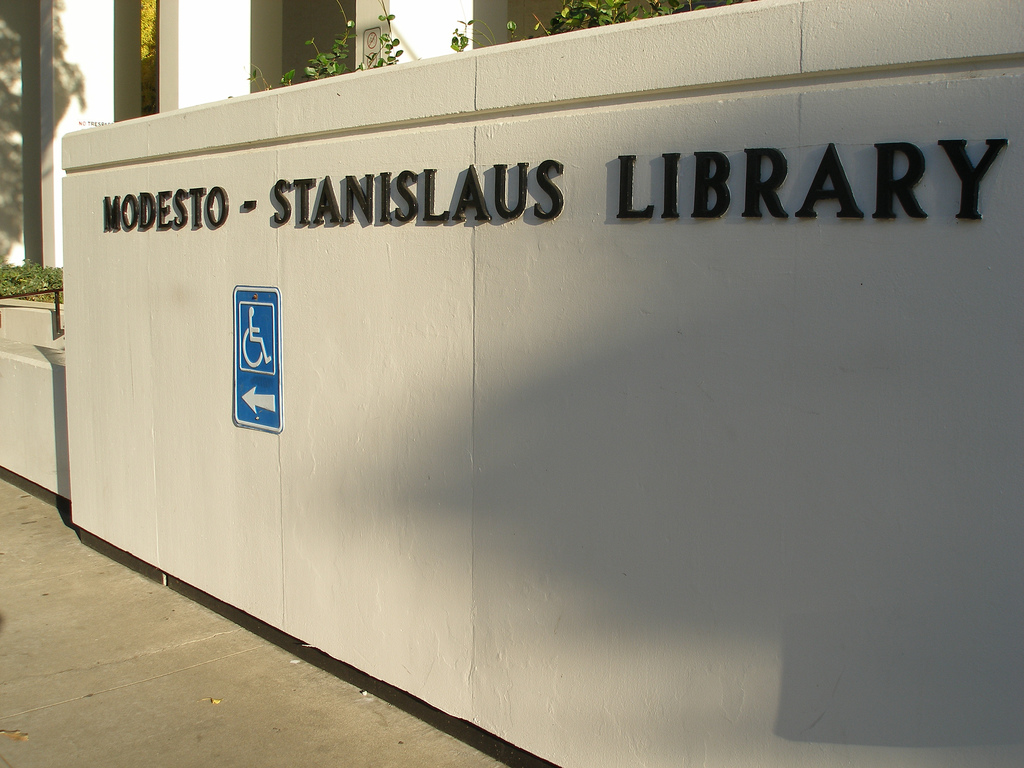
Exterior of the Stanislaus County Library

The government of Stanislaus County operates as a general law county under the California Constitution and law. Much of the government of California is in practice the responsibility of county governments such as Stanislaus County. The county government provides countywide services such as elections and voter registration, law enforcement, jails, vital records, property records, tax collection, public health, and social services. In addition the county serves as the local government for all unincorporated areas.

It is composed of the elected five-member Board of Supervisors, several other elected offices including the Sheriff-Coroner, District Attorney, Assessor, Auditor-Controller, Treasurer-Tax Collector, and Clerk-Recorder, and numerous county departments and entities under the supervision of the Chief Executive Officer (CEO).

Some chartered cities such as Modesto and Turlock provide municipal services such as police, public safety, libraries, parks and recreation, and zoning. Some other cities arrange to have the County provide some or all of these services on a contract basis. In addition, several entities of the government of California have jurisdiction conterminous with Stanislaus County, such as the Stanislaus County Superior Court.

== Organization ==
=== Board of Supervisors ===
The five-member elected Stanislaus County Board of Supervisors (BOS) is the county legislature. The board operates in a legislative, executive, and quasi-judicial capacity. As a legislative authority, it can pass ordinances for the unincorporated areas (ordinances that affect the whole county, like posting of restaurant ratings, must be ratified by the individual city). As an executive body, it can tell the county departments what to do, and how to do it. As a quasi-judicial body, the Board is the final venue of appeal in the local planning process.

As of January 2025 the members of the Stanislaus County Board of Supervisors were:

- Buck Condit—District 1, Chairman
- Vito Chiesa—District 2, Vice-Chairman
- Terry Withrow—District 3
- Mani Grewal—District 4
- Channce Condit—District 5

=== Elected officers ===
In addition to the Board of Supervisors, there are several elected officers that form the Government of Stanislaus County that are required by the California Constitution and California law.

The Stanislaus County Sheriff-Coroner provides general-service law enforcement to unincorporated areas of the county, serving as the equivalent of the county police for unincorporated areas of the county, as well as incorporated cities within the county who have contracted with the agency for law-enforcement services (known as "contract cities").

The Stanislaus County District Attorney prosecutes felony and misdemeanor crimes that occur within the jurisdiction of Stanislaus County.

=== Other departments ===
The Community Services Agency (CSA) administers multiple California welfare programs within the county, such as Medi-Cal (Medicaid), CalFresh (food stamps), CalWORKs (Temporary Assistance for Needy Families), a Medically Indigent Service Program (MISP), and a Low Income Health Program (Obamacare).

The Stanislaus County Library is the county library system.

== Law ==
The Stanislaus County Code is the codified law of the County in the form of ordinances passed by the Board of Supervisors. Every act prohibited or declared unlawful, and every failure to perform an act required, by the ordinances are misdemeanor crimes, unless otherwise specified as infractions.

== Other governments ==
=== California ===
The Stanislaus Superior Court, which covers the entire county, is not a County department but a division of the State's trial court system. Historically, the courthouses were county-owned buildings that were maintained at county expense, which created significant friction since the trial court judges, as officials of the state government, had to lobby the county Board of Supervisors for facility renovations and upgrades. In turn, the state judiciary successfully persuaded the state Legislature to authorize the transfer of all courthouses to the state government in 2008 and 2009 (so that judges would have direct control over their own courthouses). Courthouse security is still provided by the county government under a contract with the state.

=== Modesto ===
The Government of Modesto is defined under the Charter of the City of Modesto. It is a mayor–council government and consists of the Mayor, City Council, and numerous departments and officers under the supervision of the City Manager, such as the Modesto Police Department, Modesto Fire Department, Modesto Public Works Department, and Modesto Community & Economic Development Department. As of January 2025 the current Mayor was Sue Zwahlen, and the Councilors were:

- Rosa Escutia-Braaton—District 1
- Eric E. Alvarez—District 2
- Chris Ricci—District 3
- Nick Bavaro—District 4
- Jeremiah Williams—District 5
- David Wright—District 6

=== School districts ===
Stanislaus County is covered by the Yosemite Community College District.

=== Special districts ===
The Stanislaus County Local Agency Formation Commission is the Local Agency Formation Commission (LAFCo) for Stanislaus County and regulates most special district and city boundaries.
