= Airport, California =

Airport
- census-designated place
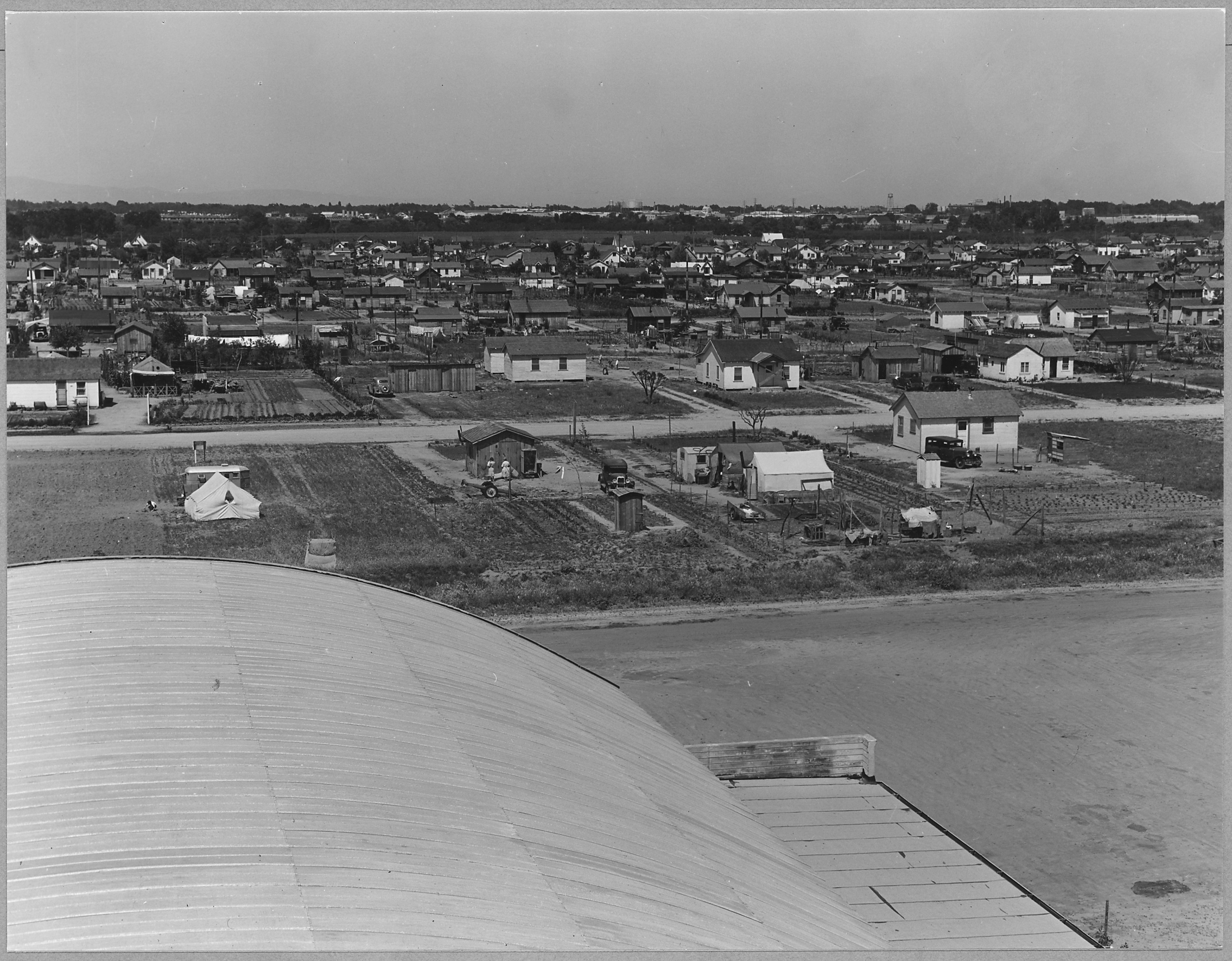
- Airport in 1940

- Position in California. Airport (the United States)
- Coordinates: 37°37′59″N 120°58′34″W
- Country: United States
- State: California
- County: Stanislaus

Area
  - Total: 0.17 sq mi (0.45 km^{2})
  - Land: 0.17 sq mi (0.45 km^{2})
  - Water: 0 sq mi (0.00 km^{2}) 1.79%
- Elevation: 92 ft (28 m)

Population (2020)
  - Total: 1,389
  - Density: 7,963.8/sq mi (3,074.85/km^{2})
- Time zone: UTC-8 (Pacific (PST))
  - Summer (DST): UTC-7 (PDT)
- GNIS feature ID: 2583084

Airport is a census-designated place (CDP) in Stanislaus County, California, United States. Airport sits at an elevation of 92 feet (28 m). and is located near Modesto City–County Airport. The 2020 United States census reported Airport's population as 1,389.

== Geography ==
According to the United States Census Bureau, the CDP covers an area of 0.6 square mile (1.5 km^{2}), of which 98.21% is land and 1.79% is water.

== Demographics ==
Historical population
Census	Pop.	Note	%±
1950	7,866		—
1960	3,689		−53.1%
2010	1,964		—
2020	1,389		−29.3%
U.S. Decennial Census; 1860–1870 1880-1890; 1900 1910 1920; 1930 1940 1950; 1960 1970 1980; 1990 2000 2010; Not listed in the census from 1970 through 2000

Airport first appeared as an unincorporated place under the name La Lomo-Airport in the 1950 U.S. census; the name was changed to simply Airport in the 1960 U.S. census. The community was not listed in the 1970 U.S. census, the 1980 U.S. Census, the 1990 U.S. Census, or the 2000 U.S. Census until its listing as a census designated place in the 2010 U.S. census.

=== 2020 census ===
As of the 2020 census, Airport had a population of 1,389. The population density was 7,982.8 inhabitants per square mile (3,082.2/km^{2}). The census reported that 97.5% of the population lived in households and 2.5% lived in non-institutionalized group quarters. 100.0% of residents lived in urban areas, while 0.0% lived in rural areas.

The median age was 33.6 years. The age distribution was 28.7% under the age of 18, 8.6% aged 18 to 24, 26.2% aged 25 to 44, 26.1% aged 45 to 64, and 10.4% who were 65 years of age or older. For every 100 females, there were 97.3 males, and for every 100 females age 18 and over, there were 99.2 males age 18 and over.

There were 401 households, out of which 44.4% had children under the age of 18 living in them. Of all households, 32.2% were married-couple households, 10.7% were cohabiting couple households, 24.9% were households with a male householder and no spouse or partner present, and 32.2% were households with a female householder and no spouse or partner present. About 21.9% of all households were made up of individuals and 7.9% had someone living alone who was 65 years of age or older. The average household size was 3.38. There were 273 families (68.1% of all households).

There were 432 housing units at an average density of 2,482.8 units per square mile (958.6 units/km^{2}), of which 401 (92.8%) were occupied and 7.2% were vacant. Of occupied units, 30.4% were owner-occupied and 69.6% were occupied by renters. The homeowner vacancy rate was 3.1% and the rental vacancy rate was 3.4%.

Racial composition as of the 2020 census
Race	Number	Percent
White	462	33.3%
Black or African American	34	2.4%
American Indian and Alaska Native	62	4.5%
Asian	34	2.4%
Native Hawaiian and Other Pacific Islander	0	0.0%
Some other race	630	45.4%
Two or more races	167	12.0%
Hispanic or Latino (of any race)	976	70.3%
