= Riverdale Park, California =

Riverdale Park
- Unincorporated Community; Census Designated Place
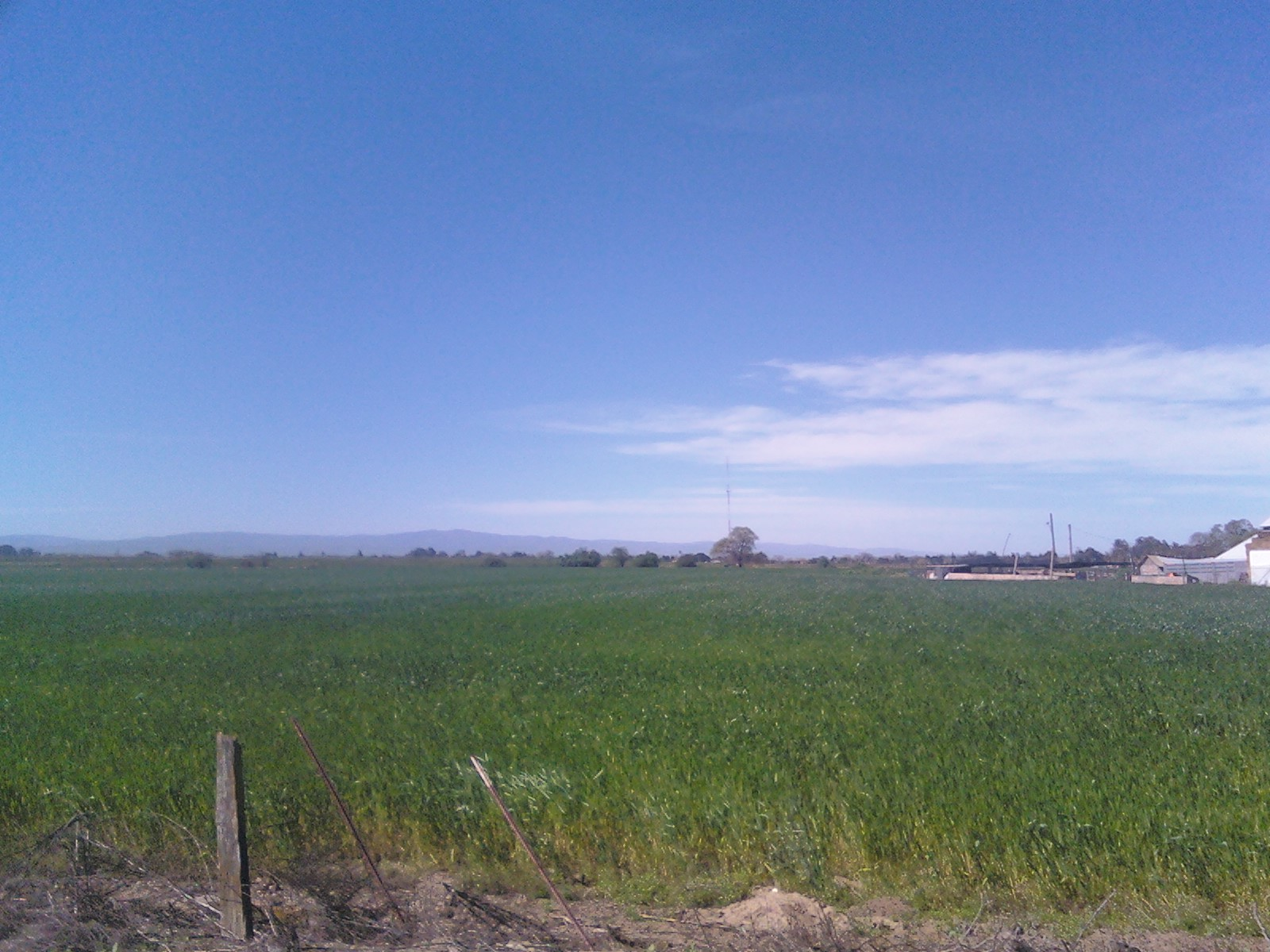
- Farmland in Riverdale Park, Mount Oso is visible in the distance.

- Location in Stanislaus County and the state of California
- Coordinates: 37°36′40″N 121°2′38″W
- Country: United States
- State: California
- County: Stanislaus

Area
  - Total: 1.488 sq mi (3.855 km^{2})
  - Land: 1.454 sq mi (3.765 km^{2})
  - Water: 0.035 sq mi (0.090 km^{2}) 2.32%
- Elevation: 69 ft (21 m)

Population (2020)
  - Total: 1,053
  - Density: 724.4/sq mi (279.7/km^{2})
- Time zone: UTC-8 (Pacific (PST))
  - Summer (DST): UTC-7 (PDT)
- ZIP code: 95367
- Area code: 209
- FIPS code: 06-61106
- GNIS feature ID: 1853409

Riverdale Park is a census-designated place (CDP) in Stanislaus County, California, United States. The population was 1,053 at the 2020 census, down from 1,128 at the 2010 census. It is part of the Modesto Metropolitan Statistical Area.

== Geography ==
Riverdale Park is located at 37°36′40″N 121°2′38″W (37.611054, -121.043786).

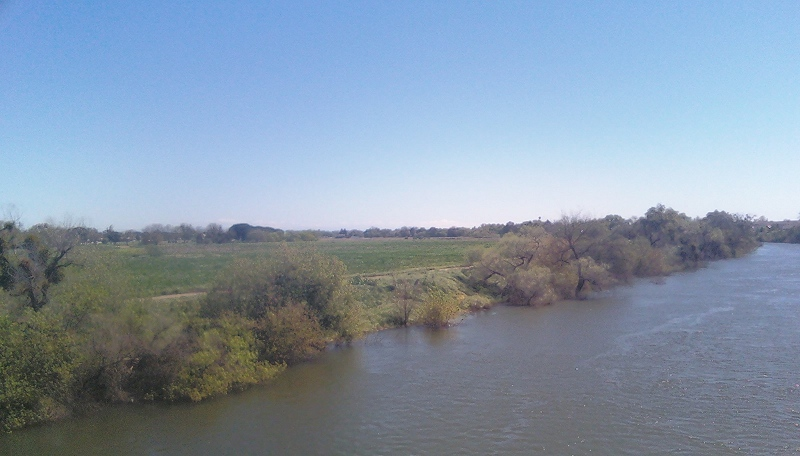
Tuolumne River in Riverdale Park.

According to the United States Census Bureau, the CDP has a total area of 1.5 square miles (3.9 km^{2}), 97.68% of it land and 2.32% of it water.

== Demographics ==
Historical population
| Census | Pop. | Note | %± |
|---|---|---|---|
| 2000 | 1,094 | | — |
| 2010 | 1,128 | | 3.1% |
| 2020 | 1,053 | | −6.6% |
U.S. Decennial Census; 1860–1870 1880-1890; 1900 1910 1920; 1930 1940 1950; 1960 1970 1980; 1990 2000 2010

Riverdale Park first appeared as a census designated place in the 2000 U.S. census.

=== 2020 census ===
As of the 2020 census, Riverdale Park had a population of 1,053. The population density was 724.2 inhabitants per square mile (279.6/km^{2}).

The census reported that 1,007 people (95.6% of the population) lived in households, 46 (4.4%) lived in non-institutionalized group quarters, and no one was institutionalized. 89.7% of residents lived in urban areas, while 10.3% lived in rural areas.

There were 300 households, out of which 113 (37.7%) had children under the age of 18 living in them. Of all households, 147 (49.0%) were married-couple households, 34 (11.3%) were cohabiting couple households, 63 (21.0%) had a male householder with no spouse or partner present, and 56 (18.7%) had a female householder with no spouse or partner present. 53 households (17.7%) were made up of individuals, and 31 (10.3%) had someone living alone who was 65 years of age or older. The average household size was 3.36. There were 224 families (74.7% of all households).

The age distribution was 257 people (24.4%) under the age of 18, 91 people (8.6%) aged 18 to 24, 286 people (27.2%) aged 25 to 44, 276 people (26.2%) aged 45 to 64, and 143 people (13.6%) who were 65 years of age or older. The median age was 37.5 years. For every 100 females, there were 105.7 males, and for every 100 females age 18 and over, there were 103.6 males age 18 and over.

There were 318 housing units at an average density of 218.7 units per square mile (84.4 units/km^{2}), of which 300 (94.3%) were occupied. Of these, 190 (63.3%) were owner-occupied, and 110 (36.7%) were occupied by renters. There were 18 vacant housing units (5.7%); the homeowner vacancy rate was 2.1% and the rental vacancy rate was 4.3%.

Racial composition as of the 2020 census
| Race | Number | Percent |
|---|---|---|
| White | 399 | 37.9% |
| Black or African American | 8 | 0.8% |
| American Indian and Alaska Native | 36 | 3.4% |
| Asian | 33 | 3.1% |
| Native Hawaiian and Other Pacific Islander | 0 | 0.0% |
| Some other race | 463 | 44.0% |
| Two or more races | 114 | 10.8% |
| Hispanic or Latino (of any race) | 688 | 65.3% |

=== Income and poverty ===
In 2023, the US Census Bureau estimated that the median household income was $61,802, and the per capita income was $31,432. About 5.0% of families and 12.5% of the population were below the poverty line.

=== 2010 census ===
The 2010 United States census reported that Riverdale Park had a population of 1,128. The population density was 761.1 inhabitants per square mile (293.9/km^{2}). The racial makeup of Riverdale Park was 575 (51.0%) White, 6 (0.5%) African American, 25 (2.2%) Native American, 29 (2.6%) Asian, 0 (0.0%) Pacific Islander, 414 (36.7%) from other races, and 79 (7.0%) from two or more races. Hispanic or Latino of any race were 700 persons (62.1%).

The Census reported that 1,125 people (99.7% of the population) lived in households, 3 (0.3%) lived in non-institutionalized group quarters, and 0 (0%) were institutionalized.

There were 298 households, out of which 151 (50.7%) had children under the age of 18 living in them, 153 (51.3%) were opposite-sex married couples living together, 57 (19.1%) had a female householder with no husband present, 36 (12.1%) had a male householder with no wife present. There were 33 (11.1%) unmarried opposite-sex partnerships, and 2 (0.7%) same-sex married couples or partnerships. 36 households (12.1%) were made up of individuals, and 15 (5.0%) had someone living alone who was 65 years of age or older. The average household size was 3.78. There were 246 families (82.6% of all households); the average family size was 3.98.

The population was spread out, with 371 people (32.9%) under the age of 18, 117 people (10.4%) aged 18 to 24, 309 people (27.4%) aged 25 to 44, 251 people (22.3%) aged 45 to 64, and 80 people (7.1%) who were 65 years of age or older. The median age was 29.6 years. For every 100 females, there were 108.5 males. For every 100 females age 18 and over, there were 105.7 males.

There were 321 housing units at an average density of 216.6 per square mile (83.6/km^{2}), of which 173 (58.1%) were owner-occupied, and 125 (41.9%) were occupied by renters. The homeowner vacancy rate was 1.7%; the rental vacancy rate was 8.1%. 616 people (54.6% of the population) lived in owner-occupied housing units and 509 people (45.1%) lived in rental housing units.

== Government ==
In the California State Legislature, Riverdale Park is in the 4th senatorial district, represented by Republican Marie Alvarado-Gil, and the 22nd Assembly district, represented by Republican Juan Alanis.

In the United States House of Representatives, Riverdale Park is in California's 13th congressional district, represented by Democrat Adam Gray.
