= West Modesto, California =

West Modesto
- Unincorporated Community; Census Designated Place
- Location in Stanislaus County and the state of California
- Coordinates: 37°37′20″N 121°1′44″W
- Country: United States
- State: California
- County: Stanislaus

Area
  - Total: 1.395 sq mi (3.613 km^{2})
  - Land: 1.381 sq mi (3.576 km^{2})
  - Water: 0.014 sq mi (0.037 km^{2}) 1.03%

Population (2020)
  - Total: 5,965
  - Density: 4,320/sq mi (1,668/km^{2})
- Time zone: UTC-8 (Pacific (PST))
  - Summer (DST): UTC-7 (PDT)
- ZIP code: 95351
- Area code: 209
- FIPS code: 06-84578

West Modesto is a census-designated place (CDP) in Stanislaus County, California, United States. The population was 5,965 at the 2020 census, up from 5,682 at the 2010 census. It is part of the Modesto Metropolitan Statistical Area.

== Geography ==
West Modesto is located at 37°37′20″N 121°1′44″W (37.622281, -121.028784).

According to the United States Census Bureau, the CDP has a total area of 1.4 square miles (3.6 km^{2}), 98.97% of it land and 1.03% of it water.

=== Climate ===
According to the Köppen Climate Classification system, West Modesto has a warm-summer Mediterranean climate, abbreviated "CSA" on climate maps.

== Demographics ==
Historical population
Census	Pop.	Note	%±
2000	6,096		—
2010	5,682		−6.8%
2020	5,965		5.0%
U.S. Decennial Census; 1860–1870 1880-1890; 1900 1910 1920; 1930 1940 1950; 1960 1970 1980; 1990 2000 2010

West Modesto first appeared as a census designated place in the 2000 U.S. census.

=== 2020 census ===
As of the 2020 census, West Modesto had a population of 5,965 and a population density of 4,319.3 inhabitants per square mile (1,667.7/km^{2}). The median age was 31.6 years. For every 100 females, there were 105.3 males, and for every 100 females age 18 and over there were 105.0 males age 18 and over.

The age distribution was 30.5% under the age of 18, 10.0% aged 18 to 24, 26.5% aged 25 to 44, 22.5% aged 45 to 64, and 10.5% who were 65 years of age or older.

99.6% of residents lived in urban areas, while 0.4% lived in rural areas. The census reported that 99.5% of the population lived in households, 0.5% lived in non-institutionalized group quarters, and no one was institutionalized.

There were 1,654 households, out of which 46.8% included children under the age of 18. Of all households, 43.4% were married-couple households, 9.6% were cohabiting couple households, 24.4% had a female householder with no spouse or partner present, and 22.6% had a male householder with no spouse or partner present. About 16.6% of households were made up of individuals, and 6.6% had someone living alone who was 65 years of age or older. The average household size was 3.59. There were 1,268 families (76.7% of all households).

There were 1,722 housing units, of which 1,654 (96.1%) were occupied and 3.9% were vacant. Of occupied housing units, 50.0% were owner-occupied and 50.0% were occupied by renters. The homeowner vacancy rate was 1.1% and the rental vacancy rate was 2.2%.

Racial composition as of the 2020 census
Race	Number	Percent
White	1,857	31.1%
Black or African American	103	1.7%
American Indian and Alaska Native	150	2.5%
Asian	296	5.0%
Native Hawaiian and Other Pacific Islander	11	0.2%
Some other race	2,805	47.0%
Two or more races	743	12.5%
Hispanic or Latino (of any race)	4,223	70.8%

=== Income and poverty ===
In 2023, the US Census Bureau estimated that the median household income was $61,833, and the per capita income was $21,185. About 18.5% of families and 18.9% of the population were below the poverty line.

=== 2010 census ===
The 2010 United States census reported that West Modesto had a population of 5,682. The population density was 2,796.2 inhabitants per square mile (1,079.6/km^{2}). The racial makeup of West Modesto was 3,020 (53.2%) White, 136 (2.4%) African American, 84 (1.5%) Native American, 263 (4.6%) Asian, 8 (0.1%) Pacific Islander, 1,885 (33.2%) from other races, and 286 (5.0%) from two or more races. Hispanic or Latino of any race were 3,526 persons (62.1%).

The Census reported that 5,651 people (99.5% of the population) lived in households, 31 (0.5%) lived in non-institutionalized group quarters, and 0 (0%) were institutionalized.

There were 1,593 households, out of which 789 (49.5%) had children under the age of 18 living in them, 757 (47.5%) were opposite-sex married couples living together, 310 (19.5%) had a female householder with no husband present, 166 (10.4%) had a male householder with no wife present. There were 167 (10.5%) unmarried opposite-sex partnerships, and 11 (0.7%) same-sex married couples or partnerships. 255 households (16.0%) were made up of individuals, and 104 (6.5%) had someone living alone who was 65 years of age or older. The average household size was 3.55. There were 1,233 families (77.4% of all households); the average family size was 3.93.

The population was spread out, with 1,755 people (30.9%) under the age of 18, 646 people (11.4%) aged 18 to 24, 1,545 people (27.2%) aged 25 to 44, 1,275 people (22.4%) aged 45 to 64, and 461 people (8.1%) who were 65 years of age or older. The median age was 30.2 years. For every 100 females, there were 103.4 males. For every 100 females age 18 and over, there were 101.5 males.

There were 1,773 housing units at an average density of 872.5 per square mile (336.9/km^{2}), of which 792 (49.7%) were owner-occupied, and 801 (50.3%) were occupied by renters. The homeowner vacancy rate was 3.5%; the rental vacancy rate was 7.0%. 2,682 people (47.2% of the population) lived in owner-occupied housing units and 2,969 people (52.3%) lived in rental housing units.

== Government ==
In the California State Legislature, West Modesto is in the 4th senatorial district, represented by Republican Marie Alvarado-Gil, and the 22nd Assembly district, represented by Republican Juan Alanis.

In the United States House of Representatives, West Modesto is in California's 13th congressional district, represented by Democrat Adam Gray as of January 2025.
