= Bret Harte (disambiguation) =

Bret Harte was an American author.

Bret Harte may also refer to any of the following, all of which were named for the author:

- Bret Harte, California, a census-designated place in Stanislaus County, California
- Bret Harte Union High School in Angels Camp, California
- Bret Harte Middle School, in the Oakland Unified School District
- Bret Harte Middle School, in the San Jose Unified School District
- Bret Harte Middle School, in the Hayward Unified School District

== See also ==
- Bret Hart (born 1957), Canadian wrestler
- Brett Hart (disambiguation)
