= Stanislaus County, California =

County in California, United States

Coordinates: 37.56°N 120.99°W

- County
- County of Stanislaus; Spanish: Condado de Estanislao
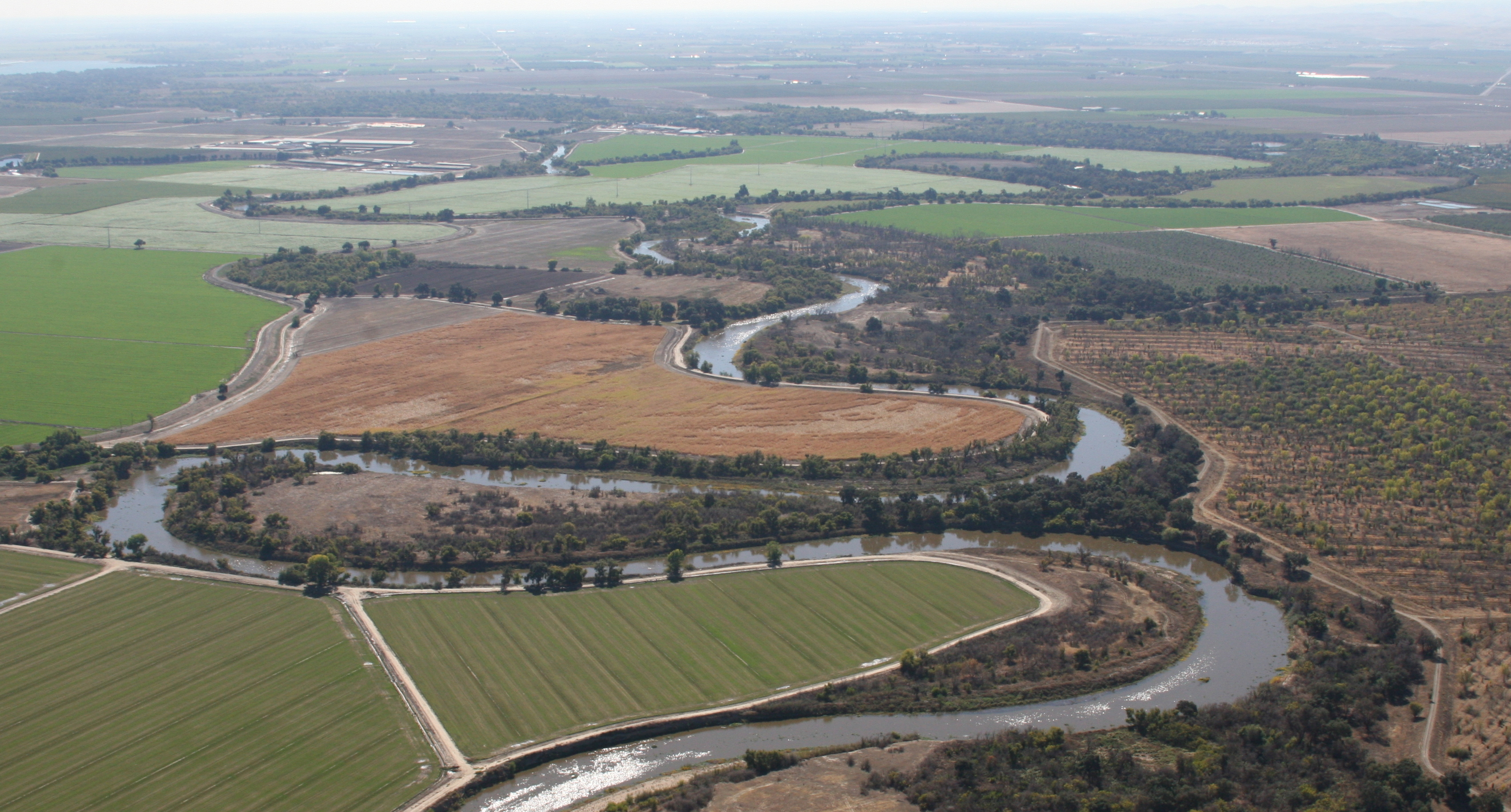
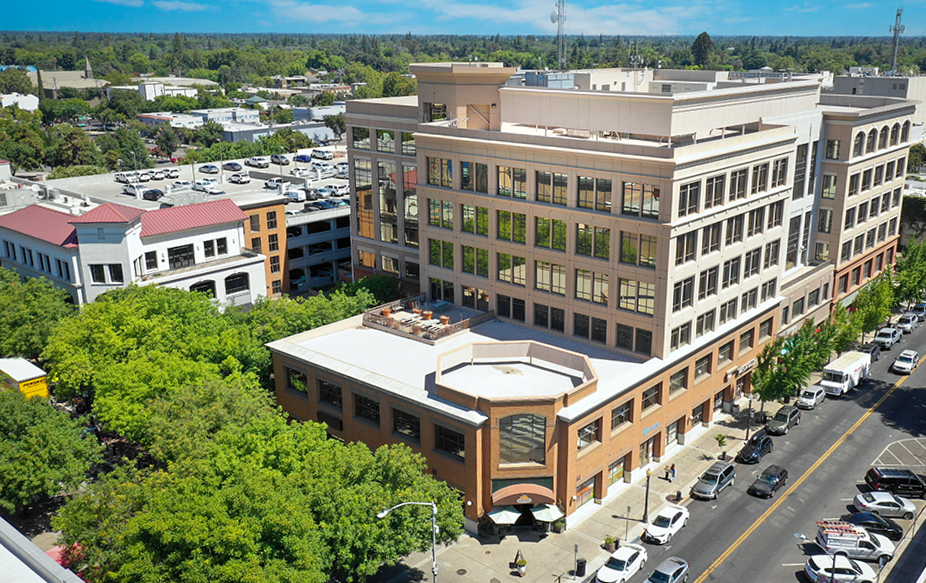
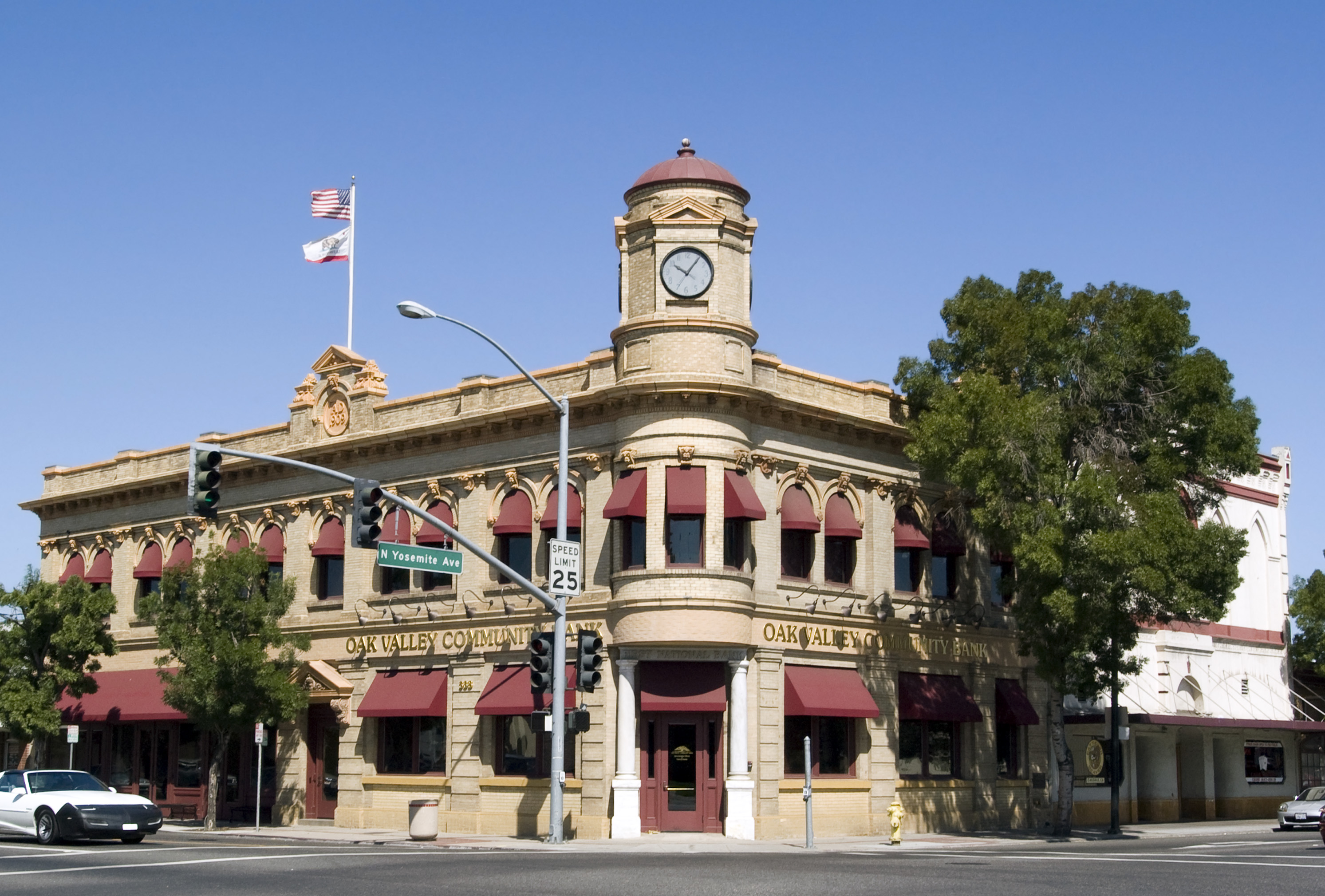
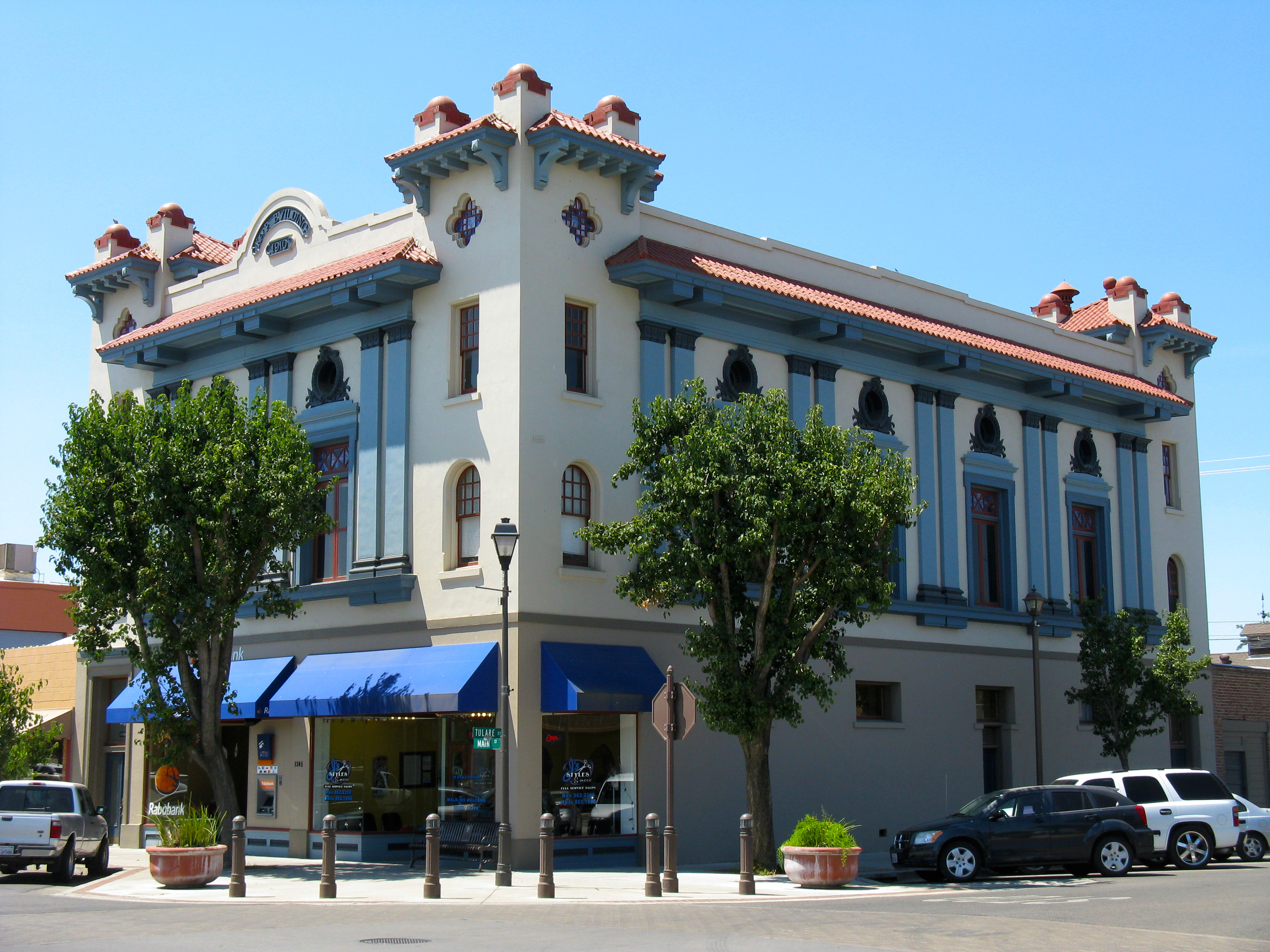
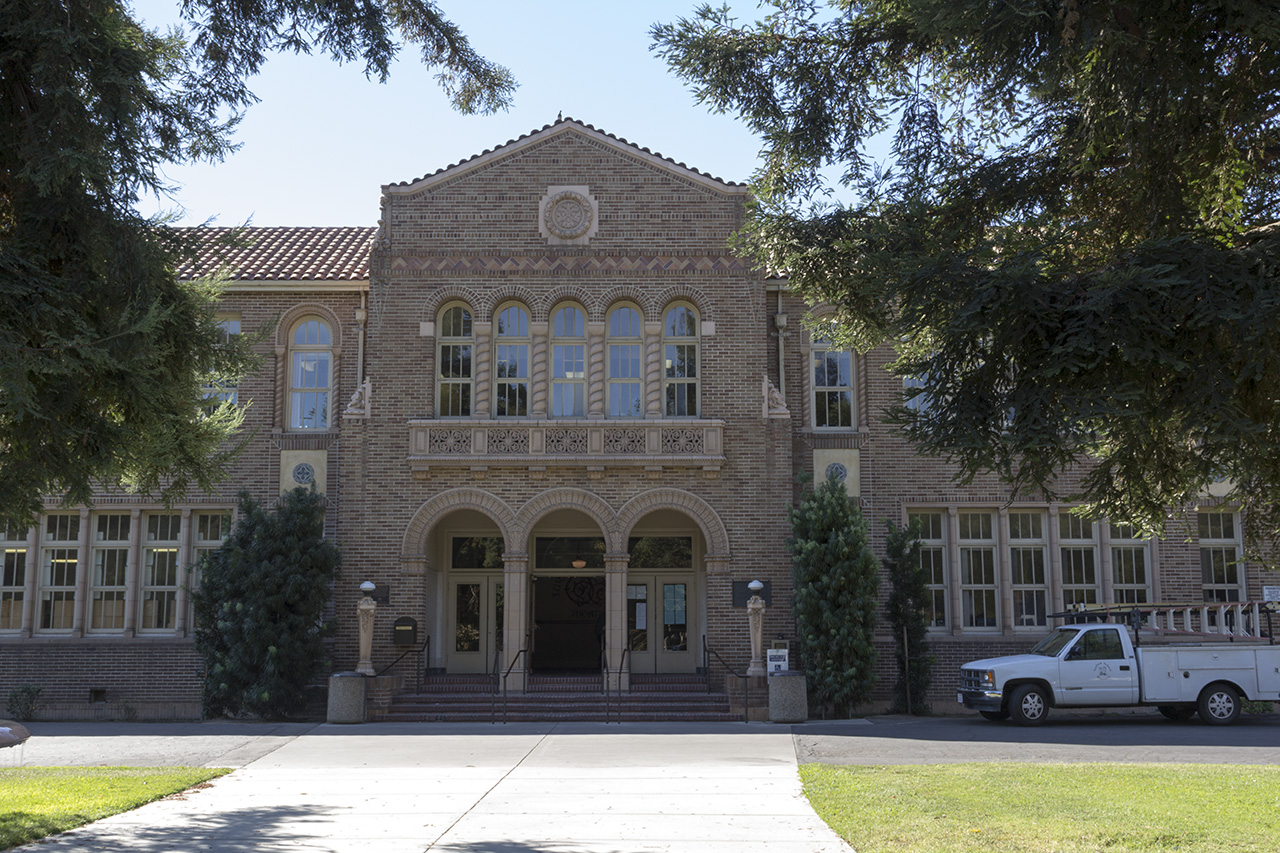
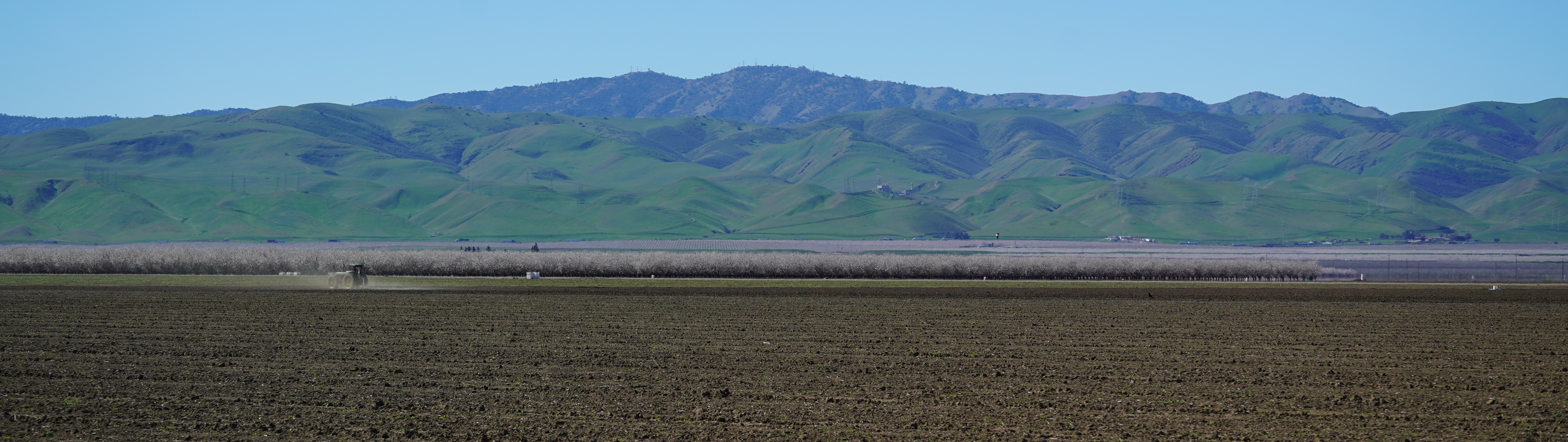
- San Joaquin River Wildlife Refuge Modesto Oakdale Newman Turlock Mount Oso and the San Joaquin Valley

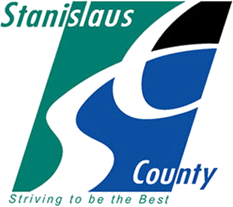
- Seal
- Motto: "Striving to be the best!"
- Interactive map of Stanislaus County
- Location in California
- Country: United States
- State: California
- Region: San Joaquin Valley
- Incorporated: April 1, 1854
- Named for: Estanislao
- County seat (and largest city): Modesto

Government
  - Type: Council–CEO
  - Body: Board of Supervisors
  - Chair: Vito Chiesa
  - Vice Chair: Terry Withrow
  - Board of Supervisors: Supervisors: Buck Condit; Vito Chiesa; Terry Withrow; Mani Grewal; Channce Condit
  - CEO: Jody Hayes

Area
  - Total: 1,515 sq mi (3,920 km^{2})
  - Land: 1,495 sq mi (3,870 km^{2})
  - Water: 20 sq mi (52 km^{2})
- Highest elevation: 3,807 ft (1,160 m)

Population (2020)
  - Total: 552,878
  - Estimate (2025): 557,719 ▲
  - Density: 369.8/sq mi (142.8/km^{2})

GDP
  - Total: $28.674 billion (2022)
- Time zone: UTC−8 (Pacific Time Zone)
  - Summer (DST): UTC−7 (Pacific Daylight Time)
- Area code: 209
- FIPS code: 06-099
- GNIS feature ID: 277314
- Congressional districts: 5th, 9th, 13th
- Website: stancounty.com

Stanislaus County (/ˈstænɪslɔː(s)/ STAN-iss-law(ss); Spanish: Condado de Estanislao) is a county located in the San Joaquin Valley of the U.S. state of California. As of 2025, its estimated population is 557,719. The county seat is Modesto.

Stanislaus County makes up the Modesto metropolitan statistical area. The county is located just east of the San Francisco Bay Area and serves as a bedroom community for those who work in the eastern part of the Bay Area.

== History ==
The first European to see the area was Gabriel Moraga in 1806.

The county was named after the Estanislao River, which in turn was named for Estanislao, a mission-educated renegade Indian chief who led a band of local Indians in a series of raids, and then battles against Mexican troops until finally being defeated by General Mariano Vallejo in 1826. Estanislao was his baptismal name, the Spanish name version after Saint Stanislaus the Martyr.

Between 1843 and 1846, when California was a province of independent Mexico, five Mexican land grants totaling 113,135 acres (458 km^{2}; 177 mi^{2}) were granted in Stanislaus County. Rancho Orestimba y Las Garzas, Rancho Pescadero and Rancho Del Puerto were located on the west side of the San Joaquin River, and Rancho Del Rio Estanislao and Rancho Thompson were on the north side of the Stanislaus River. Additionally in 1844, Salomon Pico received a Mexican land grant of 58,000 acres (235 km^{2}; 91 mi^{2}) in the San Joaquin Valley, somewhere near the Stanislaus River and the San Joaquin River in what is now Stanislaus County. However, the grant was never confirmed by the land commission.

Stanislaus County was formed from part of Tuolumne County in 1854. The county seat was first situated at Adamsville, then moved to Empire in November, La Grange in December, and Knights Ferry in 1862, and was ultimately fixed at the present location in Modesto in 1871.

As the price of housing has increased in the San Francisco Bay Area, many people who work in the southern reaches of the Bay Area have opted for the longer commute and moved to Stanislaus County for the relatively affordable housing.

== Geography ==
According to the U.S. Census Bureau, the county has a total area of 1,515 square miles (3,920 km^{2}), of which 20 square miles (52 km^{2}) (1.3%) are covered by water.

Stanislaus County has historically been divided socially and economically by the north-flowing San Joaquin River, which provided a natural barrier to trade and travel for much of the county's history. Isolated from the main rail corridors through the county and the irrigation projects that generated much of the region's economic prosperity, the part of Stanislaus County west of the river (known to locals as the "West Side" of the county) has largely remained rural and economically dependent on agricultural activities. Because of its proximity to Interstate 5 and the California Aqueduct, some towns within this area, including Patterson and Newman, have experienced tremendous growth and are being transformed into bedroom communities for commuters from the nearby San Francisco Bay Area, while others (including Westley and Crows Landing) have been almost entirely overlooked by development and remain tiny farming communities.

=== Flora and fauna ===
A number of rare and endangered species are found in Stanislaus County. The beaked clarkia, (Clarkia rostrata), is listed as a candidate for the federal endangered species list. It has only been found in blue oak-gray pine associations in the foothills of the Sierra Nevada, a habitat that occurs at moderately high elevations. Colusa grass, (Neostapfsia colusana) is listed as endangered by the state. It is restricted to vernal pools.

=== National protected area ===
- San Joaquin River National Wildlife Refuge (part)

== Transportation ==
=== Major highways ===
- Interstate 5
- State Route 4
- State Route 33
- State Route 99
- State Route 108
- State Route 120
- State Route 132
- State Route 140
- State Route 165
- State Route 219

=== Public transportation ===
- Stanislaus Regional Transit Authority operates local bus service and paratransit in Modesto, regional service in Stanislaus County, and commuter service connecting to Bay Area Rapid Transit and Altamont Corridor Express.
- The cities of Ceres, Oakdale, Riverbank, and Turlock run small local bus systems.
- Both Greyhound and Amtrak have stops in Modesto and Turlock. Amtrak for Turlock actually stops in Denair.

=== Airports ===
Modesto City-County Airport has previously had a number of scheduled passenger flights. Currently, its main air traffic is general aviation. Other (general aviation) airports around the county include Oakdale Airport, Patterson Airport, and Turlock Airpark.

== Demographics ==
Historical population
| Census | Pop. | Note | %± |
|---|---|---|---|
| 1860 | 2,245 | | — |
| 1870 | 6,499 | | 189.5% |
| 1880 | 8,751 | | 34.7% |
| 1890 | 10,040 | | 14.7% |
| 1900 | 9,550 | | −4.9% |
| 1910 | 22,522 | | 135.8% |
| 1920 | 43,557 | | 93.4% |
| 1930 | 56,641 | | 30.0% |
| 1940 | 74,866 | | 32.2% |
| 1950 | 127,231 | | 69.9% |
| 1960 | 157,294 | | 23.6% |
| 1970 | 194,506 | | 23.7% |
| 1980 | 265,900 | | 36.7% |
| 1990 | 370,522 | | 39.3% |
| 2000 | 446,997 | | 20.6% |
| 2010 | 514,453 | | 15.1% |
| 2020 | 552,878 | | 7.5% |
| 2025 (est.) | 557,719 | ▲ | 0.9% |
U.S. Decennial Census; 1790-1960 1900–1990; 1990-2000 2010 2020

=== 2020 census ===
Stanislaus County, California – Racial and ethnic composition Note: the US Census treats Hispanic/Latino as an ethnic category. This table excludes Latinos from the racial categories and assigns them to a separate category. Hispanics/Latinos may be of any race.
| Race / Ethnicity (NH = Non-Hispanic) | Pop 1980 | Pop 1990 | Pop 2000 | Pop 2010 | Pop 2020 | % 1980 | % 1990 | % 2000 | % 2010 | % 2020 |
|---|---|---|---|---|---|---|---|---|---|---|
| White alone (NH) | 213,165 | 261,323 | 256,001 | 240,423 | 207,908 | 80.17% | 70.53% | 57.27% | 46.73% | 37.60% |
| Black or African American alone (NH) | 3,035 | 6,109 | 10,621 | 13,065 | 14,302 | 1.14% | 1.65% | 2.38% | 2.54% | 2.59% |
| Native American or Alaska Native alone (NH) | 3,195 | 3,474 | 3,483 | 2,870 | 2,621 | 1.20% | 0.94% | 0.78% | 0.56% | 0.47% |
| Asian alone (NH) | 4,106 | 18,146 | 18,234 | 24,712 | 33,169 | 1.54% | 4.90% | 4.08% | 4.80% | 6.00% |
| Native Hawaiian or Pacific Islander alone (NH) | x | x | 1,354 | 3,016 | 3,713 | x | x | 0.30% | 0.59% | 0.67% |
| Other race alone (NH) | 2,510 | 573 | 971 | 842 | 2,734 | 0.94% | 0.15% | 0.22% | 0.16% | 0.49% |
| Mixed race or Multiracial (NH) | x | x | 14,462 | 13,867 | 22,453 | x | x | 3.24% | 2.70% | 4.06% |
| Hispanic or Latino (any race) | 39,889 | 80,897 | 141,871 | 215,658 | 265,978 | 15.00% | 21.83% | 31.74% | 41.92% | 48.11% |
| Total | 265,900 | 370,522 | 446,997 | 514,453 | 552,878 | 100.00% | 100.00% | 100.00% | 100.00% | 100.00% |

=== American Community Survey 2025 data ===
The United States Census Bureau estimated that in 2025, Stanislaus County’s population was 557.719. It was also estimated that the county's population was 33,50% Non-Hispanic White, 52,08% Hispanic or Latino, 2,69% Non-Hispanic Black, 6,86% Asian, 0,46% Native American, 0,78% Pacific Islander, and 3,63% Multiracial.

| Total | Population | Percentage |
|---|---|---|
| Non-Hispanic White | 186.810 | 33,50% |
| Hispanic or Latino | 290.458 | 52,08% |
| Non-Hispanic Black | 15.017 | 2,69% |
| Asian | 38.259 | 6,86% |
| Native American | 2.579 | 0,46% |
| Pacific Islander | 4.375 | 0,78% |
| Non-Hispanic Multiracial | 20.221 | 3,63% |

As of the 2020 census, the county had a population of 552,878. The median age was 35.5 years. 26.2% of residents were under the age of 18 and 14.2% of residents were 65 years of age or older. For every 100 females there were 97.2 males, and for every 100 females age 18 and over there were 94.7 males age 18 and over.

The racial makeup of the county was 46.4% White, 2.9% Black or African American, 1.9% American Indian and Alaska Native, 6.3% Asian, 0.8% Native Hawaiian and Pacific Islander, 26.4% from some other race, and 15.3% from two or more races. Hispanic or Latino residents of any race comprised 48.1% of the population.

91.8% of residents lived in urban areas, while 8.2% lived in rural areas.

There were 176,738 households in the county, of which 40.2% had children under the age of 18 living with them and 25.1% had a female householder with no spouse or partner present. About 19.2% of all households were made up of individuals and 9.1% had someone living alone who was 65 years of age or older.

There were 183,140 housing units, of which 3.5% were vacant. Among occupied housing units, 59.8% were owner-occupied and 40.2% were renter-occupied. The homeowner vacancy rate was 0.9% and the rental vacancy rate was 3.3%.

=== 2010 Census ===
The 2010 United States census reported that Stanislaus County had a population of 514,453. The racial makeup of Stanislaus County was 337,342 (65.6%) White, 14,721 (2.9%) African American, 5,902 (1.1%) Native American, 26,090 (5.1%) Asian (1.5% Indian, 1.1% Filipino, 0.7% Cambodian, 0.5% Chinese, 0.3% Vietnamese, 0.3% Laotian, 0.1% Japanese, 0.1% Korean, 0.1% Cambodian), 3,401 (0.7%) Pacific Islander, 99,210 (19.3%) from other races, and 27,787 (5.4%) from two or more races. Hispanics or Latinos of any race were 215,658 persons (41.9%); 37.6% of Stanislaus County is Mexican, 0.6% Puerto Rican, 0.5% Salvadoran, 0.2% Nicaraguan, and 0.2% Guatemalan.

(Note - the US Census Bureau says "this system treats race and ethnicity as separate and independent categories. This means that within the federal system, everyone is classified as both a member of one of the four race groups and also as either Hispanic or non-Hispanic." Consequently, there are a total of 8 race-ethnicity categories (e.g., White-Hispanic, White-non-Hispanic, Black-Hispanic, Black non-Hispanic, etc.). That, in turn, means that the total Hispanic population is made up of each of the four groups, thus the separate distinction for Hispanic and non-Hispanic.)

Population reported at 2010 United States census
| The County | Total; Population | White | African; American | Native; American | Asian | Pacific; Islander | Other races | two or more races | Hispanic or Latino (of any race) |
| Stanislaus County | 514,453 | 337,342 | 14,721 | 5,902 | 26,090 | 3,401 | 99,210 | 27,787 | 215,658 |
| Incorporated cities | Total; Population | White | African; American | Native; American | Asian | Pacific; Islander | Other races | Two or more races | Hispanic or Latino (of any race) |
| Ceres | 45,417 | 26,217 | 1,185 | 609 | 3,093 | 346 | 11,463 | 2,504 | 25,436 |
| Hughson | 6,640 | 5,125 | 55 | 74 | 97 | 13 | 982 | 294 | 2,871 |
| Modesto | 201,165 | 130,833 | 8,396 | 2,494 | 13,557 | 1,924 | 31,244 | 12,717 | 71,381 |
| Newman | 10,224 | 6,812 | 234 | 106 | 191 | 40 | 2,287 | 554 | 6,299 |
| Oakdale | 20,675 | 16,558 | 163 | 210 | 463 | 37 | 2,386 | 858 | 5,398 |
| Patterson | 20,413 | 10,117 | 1,291 | 221 | 1,069 | 280 | 6,235 | 1,200 | 11,971 |
| Riverbank | 22,678 | 14,951 | 480 | 269 | 770 | 88 | 4,949 | 1,171 | 11,822 |
| Turlock | 68,549 | 47,864 | 1,160 | 601 | 3,865 | 313 | 11,328 | 3,418 | 24,957 |
| Waterford | 8,456 | 6,003 | 77 | 110 | 129 | 11 | 1,740 | 386 | 3,579 |
| Census-designated places | Total; Population | White | African; American | Native; American | Asian | Pacific; Islander | other races | two or more races | Hispanic or Latino (of any race) |
| Airport | 1,964 | 1,108 | 41 | 47 | 66 | 3 | 564 | 135 | 1,250 |
| Bret Harte | 5,152 | 2,441 | 52 | 50 | 40 | 45 | 2,327 | 197 | 4,272 |
| Bystrom | 4,008 | 2,006 | 79 | 62 | 91 | 18 | 1,580 | 172 | 3,053 |
| Cowan | 318 | 274 | 0 | 2 | 0 | 0 | 32 | 10 | 161 |
| Crows Landing | 355 | 162 | 5 | 1 | 0 | 0 | 182 | 5 | 248 |
| Del Rio | 1,270 | 1,027 | 25 | 5 | 143 | 1 | 27 | 42 | 107 |
| Denair | 4,404 | 3,425 | 25 | 55 | 42 | 4 | 699 | 154 | 1,423 |
| Diablo Grande | 826 | 510 | 77 | 3 | 70 | 6 | 77 | 83 | 254 |
| East Oakdale | 2,762 | 2,530 | 7 | 18 | 60 | 5 | 78 | 64 | 284 |
| Empire | 4,189 | 2,274 | 22 | 56 | 59 | 8 | 1,500 | 270 | 2,275 |
| Grayson | 952 | 455 | 17 | 4 | 3 | 0 | 417 | 56 | 819 |
| Hickman | 641 | 503 | 1 | 15 | 4 | 0 | 98 | 20 | 180 |
| Keyes | 5,601 | 3,109 | 71 | 60 | 200 | 32 | 1,919 | 210 | 3,233 |
| Monterey Park Tract | 133 | 77 | 17 | 0 | 0 | 0 | 38 | 1 | 112 |
| Parklawn | 1,337 | 673 | 24 | 22 | 7 | 0 | 541 | 70 | 1,090 |
| Riverdale Park | 1,128 | 575 | 6 | 25 | 29 | 0 | 414 | 79 | 700 |
| Rouse | 2,005 | 896 | 101 | 24 | 199 | 12 | 658 | 115 | 1,280 |
| Salida | 13,722 | 8,479 | 435 | 111 | 669 | 83 | 3,134 | 811 | 6,426 |
| Shackelford | 3,371 | 1,560 | 27 | 63 | 59 | 1 | 1,496 | 165 | 2,685 |
| Valley Home | 228 | 186 | 2 | 3 | 0 | 0 | 27 | 10 | 34 |
| West Modesto | 5,682 | 3,020 | 136 | 84 | 263 | 8 | 1,885 | 286 | 3,526 |
| Westley | 603 | 212 | 0 | 5 | 1 | 0 | 368 | 17 | 579 |
| Other unincorporated areas | Total; Population | White | African; American | Native; American | Asian | Pacific; Islander | other races | two or more races | Hispanic or Latino (of any race) |
| All others not CDPs (combined) | 49,585 | 37,360 | 510 | 493 | 851 | 123 | 8,535 | 1,713 | 17,953 |

=== 2000 ===
As of the census of 2000, 446,997 people, 145,146 households, and 109,585 families were residing in the county. The population density was 299 people per square mile (115 people/km^{2}). The 150,807 housing units had an average density of 101 units per square mile (39 units/km^{2}). The racial/ethnic makeup of the county was 69.3% White, 2.6% Black, 4.2% Asian, 1.3% Native American, 0.3% Pacific Islander, 16.8% from other races, and 5.4% from two or more races. About 31.7% of the population were Hispanic or Latino of any race; 8.4% were of German, 6.3% English, 6.0% American, 5.5% Irish, and 5.1% Portuguese ancestry according to Census 2000. About 67.8% spoke English, 23.7% Spanish, 1.5% Syriac, and 1.3% Portuguese as their first languages.

Of the 145,146 households, 41.2% had children under 18 living with them, 56.0% were married couples living together, 13.7% had a female householder with no husband present, and 24.5% were not families. About 19.4% of all households were made up of individuals, and 7.9% had someone living alone who was 65 or older. The average household size was 3.03, and the average family size was 3.47.

In the county, the age distribution was 31.1% under 18, 9.8% from 18 to 24, 29.0% from 25 to 44, 19.5% from 45 to 64, and 10.4% who were 65 or older. The median age was 32 years. For every 100 females, there were 96.8 males. For every 100 females 18 and over, there were 93.4 males.

The median income for a household in the county was $40,101, and for a family was $44,703. Males had a median income of $36,969 versus $26,595 for females. The per capita income for the county was $16,913. About 12.3% of families and 16.0% of the population were below the poverty line, including 20.5% of those under 18 and 8.8% of those 65 or over.

== Metropolitan statistical area ==
The United States Office of Management and Budget has designated Stanislaus County as the Modesto, CA metropolitan statistical area (MSA). The United States Census Bureau ranked the Modesto MSA as the 103rd-most populous MSA of the United States as of July 1, 2012.

The Office of Management and Budget has further designated the Modesto MSA as a component of the more extensive San Francisco-Oakland-San Jose, CA combined statistical area, the 5th-most populous combined statistical area in the United States.

== Crime ==
The following table includes the number of incidents reported and the rate per 1,000 persons for each type of offense.

Population and crime rates
| Population | 512,469 | |
| Violent crime | 2,721 | 5.31 |
| Homicide | 46 | 0.09 |
| Forcible rape | 122 | 0.24 |
| Robbery | 706 | 1.38 |
| Aggravated assault | 1,847 | 3.60 |
| Property crime | 12,156 | 23.72 |
| Burglary | 5,748 | 11.22 |
| Larceny-theft (Note: Only larceny-theft cases involving property over $400 in value are reported as property crimes.) | 12,428 | 24.25 |
| Motor vehicle theft | 3,401 | 6.64 |
| Arson | 373 | 0.73 |

=== Cities by population and crime rates ===
Cities by population and crime rates
| City | Population | Violent crimes | Violent crime rate per 1,000 persons | Property crimes | Property crime rate per 1,000 persons |
|---|---|---|---|---|---|
| Ceres | 46,167 | 183 | 3.96 | 1,940 | 42.02 |
| Hughson | 6,754 | 10 | 1.48 | 144 | 21.32 |
| Modesto | 204,631 | 1,590 | 7.77 | 11,276 | 55.10 |
| Newman | 10,402 | 25 | 2.40 | 194 | 18.65 |
| Oakdale | 21,031 | 58 | 2.76 | 934 | 44.41 |
| Patterson | 20,769 | 53 | 2.55 | 734 | 35.34 |
| Riverbank | 23,070 | 57 | 2.47 | 761 | 32.99 |
| Turlock | 69,733 | 445 | 6.38 | 2,486 | 35.65 |
| Waterford | 8,604 | 31 | 3.60 | 205 | 23.83 |

== Government, politics, and policing ==
=== Government ===
The government of Stanislaus County is defined and authorized under the California Constitution and law as a general law county. The county government provides countywide services such as elections and voter registration, law enforcement, jails, vital records, property records, tax collection, public health, and social services. In addition, the county serves as the local government for all unincorporated areas.

The county government is composed of the elected five-member board of supervisors, several other elected offices including the sheriff-coroner, district attorney, tax assessor, auditor-controller, treasurer-tax collector, and clerk-recorder, and numerous county departments and entities under the supervision of the chief executive officer. As of January 2025, the members of the Stanislaus County Board of Supervisors were:

- Buck Condit, District 1, chairman
- Vito Chiesa, District 2, vice chairman
- Terry Withrow, District 3
- Mani Grewal, District 4
- Channce Condit, District 5

=== Policing ===
==== Sheriff ====
The Stanislaus County Sheriff provides court protection, jail administration, and coroner services for the entire county. It provides patrol and detective services for the unincorporated areas of the county. The sheriff also provides law-enforcement services by contract to the municipalities of Riverbank, Patterson, Waterford, Salida, and Hughson. These municipalities fund police coverage as specified in the respective sheriff's contract with each city.

==== Municipal police ====
Municipal police departments in the county are: Modesto, population 213,000; Turlock, 73,000; Ceres, 46,000; Oakdale, 23,000; Newman 11,000.

=== Politics ===
==== Voter registration statistics ====
Population and registered voters
| Total population | 512,469 | |
| Registered voters (Note: Percentage of registered voters with respect to total population. Percentages of party members with respect to registered voters follow.) | 231,870 | 45.2% |
| Democratic | 92,788 | 40.0% |
| Republican | 90,002 | 38.8% |
| Democratic–Republican spread | +2,786 | +1.2% |
| Independent | 6,442 | 2.8% |
| Green | 698 | 0.3% |
| Libertarian | 1,144 | 0.5% |
| Peace and Freedom | 682 | 0.3% |
| Americans Elect | 14 | 0.0% |
| Other | 2,437 | 1.1% |
| No party preference | 37,663 | 16.2% |

===== Cities by population and voter registration =====
Cities by population and voter registration
| City | Population | Registered voters | Democratic | Republican | D–R spread | Other | No party preference |
|---|---|---|---|---|---|---|---|
| Ceres | 44,731 | 42.6% | 46.4% | 33.0% | +13.4% | 7.1% | 16.1% |
| Hughson | 6,425 | 50.8% | 32.2% | 44.8% | -12.6% | 8.4% | 17.8% |
| Modesto | 202,751 | 48.6% | 41.9% | 37.5% | +4.4% | 7.7% | 15.7% |
| Newman | 9,989 | 37.4% | 42.9% | 33.4% | +9.5% | 8.7% | 18.2% |
| Oakdale | 20,364 | 48.1% | 31.2% | 45.0% | -13.8% | 9.9% | 17.6% |
| Patterson | 19,697 | 39.4% | 49.9% | 25.7% | +24.2% | 8.2% | 19.3% |
| Riverbank | 22,198 | 41.9% | 39.9% | 36.7% | +3.2% | 7.7% | 18.6% |
| Turlock | 69,733 | 44.9% | 38.4% | 39.3% | -0.9% | 7.6% | 17.3% |
| Waterford | 8,395 | 41.2% | 31.7% | 41.9% | -10.2% | 9.1% | 21.0% |

==== Overview ====
Just like neighboring Merced County, Stanislaus is considered a bellwether county in presidential elections. The last major-party nominee to gain over 60% of the vote was Lyndon B. Johnson in 1964. Furthermore, in 1960, Stanislaus County was one of the most bellwether counties in terms of the popular vote, voting 0.02% more Democratic than the national average. It has voted for the winning candidate for president in every election since 1972, except in 2016 when it voted for Hillary Clinton instead of Donald Trump. In 2024, Donald Trump won the county in a decisive victory, continuing the county's bellwether county status.

Trump's win in Stanislaus County made it one of ten counties in California to flip from Biden to Trump, as well as making Stanislaus one of six counties to vote for the Republican presidential candidate for the first time in 20 years since George W. Bush in 2004. Despite its bellwether status, 1976 was the last time that a Democrat won a majority of the vote.

United States presidential election results for Stanislaus County, California
| Year | Republican | | Democratic | | Third party(ies) | |
| Year | No. | % | No. | % | No. | % |
|---|---|---|---|---|---|---|
| 1880 | 752 | 39.31% | 1,161 | 60.69% | 0 | 0.00% |
| 1884 | 979 | 39.49% | 1,424 | 57.44% | 76 | 3.07% |
| 1888 | 903 | 39.02% | 1,315 | 56.83% | 96 | 4.15% |
| 1892 | 992 | 38.90% | 1,369 | 53.69% | 189 | 7.41% |
| 1896 | 1,007 | 40.92% | 1,398 | 56.81% | 56 | 2.28% |
| 1900 | 1,058 | 43.81% | 1,270 | 52.59% | 87 | 3.60% |
| 1904 | 1,437 | 52.39% | 1,110 | 40.47% | 196 | 7.15% |
| 1908 | 1,663 | 46.45% | 1,390 | 38.83% | 527 | 14.72% |
| 1912 | 17 | 0.22% | 3,127 | 39.58% | 4,756 | 60.20% |
| 1916 | 4,401 | 37.66% | 5,490 | 46.98% | 1,796 | 15.37% |
| 1920 | 7,038 | 61.61% | 3,055 | 26.74% | 1,330 | 11.64% |
| 1924 | 7,569 | 56.86% | 1,274 | 9.57% | 4,469 | 33.57% |
| 1928 | 10,753 | 67.13% | 5,063 | 31.61% | 203 | 1.27% |
| 1932 | 7,614 | 36.18% | 12,336 | 58.63% | 1,092 | 5.19% |
| 1936 | 8,613 | 35.44% | 15,341 | 63.13% | 348 | 1.43% |
| 1940 | 14,803 | 46.63% | 16,494 | 51.96% | 449 | 1.41% |
| 1944 | 14,297 | 47.23% | 15,537 | 51.33% | 437 | 1.44% |
| 1948 | 18,564 | 48.38% | 18,350 | 47.82% | 1,457 | 3.80% |
| 1952 | 29,270 | 55.57% | 22,837 | 43.35% | 570 | 1.08% |
| 1956 | 26,695 | 48.60% | 28,040 | 51.05% | 192 | 0.35% |
| 1960 | 30,213 | 49.62% | 30,302 | 49.77% | 375 | 0.62% |
| 1964 | 21,973 | 33.74% | 43,078 | 66.14% | 77 | 0.12% |
| 1968 | 29,573 | 45.45% | 31,316 | 48.13% | 4,174 | 6.42% |
| 1972 | 39,521 | 51.41% | 35,005 | 45.54% | 2,341 | 3.05% |
| 1976 | 32,937 | 44.83% | 38,448 | 52.34% | 2,080 | 2.83% |
| 1980 | 41,595 | 49.41% | 33,683 | 40.01% | 8,908 | 10.58% |
| 1984 | 55,665 | 59.23% | 37,459 | 39.86% | 861 | 0.92% |
| 1988 | 51,648 | 53.07% | 44,685 | 45.92% | 982 | 1.01% |
| 1992 | 47,275 | 36.93% | 52,415 | 40.95% | 28,315 | 22.12% |
| 1996 | 52,403 | 44.79% | 53,738 | 45.93% | 10,866 | 9.29% |
| 2000 | 67,188 | 52.38% | 56,448 | 44.01% | 4,631 | 3.61% |
| 2004 | 85,407 | 58.65% | 58,829 | 40.40% | 1,388 | 0.95% |
| 2008 | 77,497 | 47.98% | 80,279 | 49.70% | 3,736 | 2.31% |
| 2012 | 73,459 | 47.14% | 77,724 | 49.88% | 4,633 | 2.97% |
| 2016 | 78,494 | 45.01% | 81,647 | 46.81% | 14,265 | 8.18% |
| 2020 | 104,145 | 48.22% | 105,841 | 49.00% | 6,001 | 2.78% |
| 2024 | 106,986 | 53.88% | 85,347 | 42.98% | 6,225 | 3.14% |

In the United States House of Representatives, Stanislaus County is split between California's 5th congressional district, represented by Republican Tom McClintock, California's 9th congressional district, represented by Democrat Josh Harder, and California's 13th congressional district, represented by Democrat Adam Gray.

In the California State Senate, Stanislaus is represented by:

- the 4th Senate District, represented by Republican Marie Alvarado-Gil.

In the California State Assembly, Stanislaus is split between the 22nd Assembly District, represented by Republican Juan Alanis, and the 9th Assembly District, represented by Republican Heath Flora.

== Economy ==
Agriculture is Stanislaus County's number one industry, with almonds being the primary agricultural product.

== Education ==
=== Tertiary ===
The California State University, Stanislaus is a campus of the California State University located in Turlock.

The Yosemite Community College District covers a 4,500-sq-mi area and serves a population over 550,000, encompassing all of two counties (Stanislaus and Tuolumne) and parts of four others (Calaveras, Merced, San Joaquin, and Santa Clara). It is composed of two colleges: Modesto Junior College in Modesto and Columbia College in Sonora in Tuolumne County to the northeast.

Kaplan College has a campus in Modesto, ITT Technical Institute has campus in Lathrop in San Joaquin County to the northeast, and San Joaquin Valley College has campus in Modesto.

=== K-12 education ===
School districts include:

Unified:

- Ceres Unified School District
- Denair Unified School District
- Hughson Unified School District - Serves some areas for PK-12 and some only for 9–12
- Newman-Crows Landing Unified School District
- Oakdale Joint Unified School District - Serves some areas for PK-12 and some only for 9–12
- Patterson Joint Unified School District
- Riverbank Unified School District
- Turlock Unified School District - Serves some areas for PK-12 and some only for 9–12
- Waterford Unified School District

Secondary:

- Modesto City High School District

Elementary:

- Chatom Union Elementary School District
- Empire Union Elementary School District
- Gratton Elementary School District
- Hart-Ransom Union Elementary School District
- Hickman Community Charter School District
- Keyes Union Elementary School District
- Knights Ferry Elementary School District
- Modesto City Elementary School District
- Paradise Elementary School District
- Roberts Ferry Union Elementary School District
- Salida Union Elementary School District
- Shiloh Elementary School District
- Stanislaus Union Elementary School District
- Sylvan Union Elementary School District
- Valley Home Joint Elementary School District

== Media ==
Stanislaus County is in the Sacramento television market, thus receives Sacramento media.

The county also has media outlets that serve the local community:

- The Modesto Press is the local online news site for Modesto and the surrounding areas of the Central Valley.
- The Modesto Bee is a Modesto-based daily newspaper.

== Communities ==
=== Incorporated cities ===
- Ceres
- Hughson
- Modesto (county seat)
- Newman
- Oakdale
- Patterson
- Riverbank
- Turlock
- Waterford

=== Census-designated places ===
- Airport
- Bret Harte
- Bystrom
- Cowan
- Crows Landing
- Del Rio
- Denair
- Diablo Grande
- East Oakdale
- Empire
- Grayson
- Hickman
- Keyes
- Knights Ferry
- La Grange
- Monterey Park Tract
- Orange Blossom
- Parklawn
- Riverdale Park
- Rouse
- Salida
- Shackelford (former)
- Valley Home
- West Modesto
- Westley

=== Other unincorporated communities ===
- Hills Ferry
- Langworth
- McHenry
- Montpelier
- Mountain View
- Oso
- Roberts Ferry
- Timba (or Orestimba)
- Tuolumne
- Wood Colony
- Eugene

=== Population ranking ===
The population ranking of the following table is based on the 2020 census of Stanislaus County.

† county seat

| Rank | City/Town/etc. | Municipal type | Population (2020 census) |
|---|---|---|---|
| 1 | † Modesto | City | 218,464 |
| 2 | Turlock | City | 72,740 |
| 3 | Ceres | City | 49,302 |
| 4 | Riverbank | City | 24,865 |
| 5 | Patterson | City | 23,781 |
| 6 | Oakdale | City | 23,181 |
| 7 | Salida | CDP | 13,886 |
| 8 | Newman | City | 12,351 |
| 9 | Waterford | City | 9,120 |
| 10 | Hughson | City | 7,481 |
| 11 | West Modesto | CDP | 5,965 |
| 12 | Keyes | CDP | 5,672 |
| 13 | Bret Harte | CDP | 5,135 |
| 14 | Denair | CDP | 4,865 |
| 15 | Empire | CDP | 4,202 |
| 16 | Bystrom | CDP | 3,957 |
| 17 | East Oakdale | CDP | 3,201 |
| 18 | Rouse | CDP | 1,913 |
| 19 | Diablo Grande | CDP | 1,669 |
| 20 | Del Rio | CDP | 1,399 |
| 21 | Airport | CDP | 1,389 |
| 22 | Parklawn | CDP | 1,249 |
| 23 | Orange Blossom | CDP | 1,068 |
| 24 | Riverdale Park | CDP | 1,053 |
| 25 | Grayson | CDP | 1,041 |
| 26 | Hickman | CDP | 604 |
| 27 | Westley | CDP | 575 |
| 28 | Cowan | CDP | 342 |
| 29 | Crows Landing | CDP | 322 |
| 30 | Valley Home | CDP | 284 |
| 31 | Monterey Park Tract | CDP | 164 |
| 32 | La Grange | CDP | 166 |
| 33 | Knights Ferry | CDP | 112 |

== See also ==
- List of museums in the San Joaquin Valley
- List of school districts in Stanislaus County, California
- National Register of Historic Places listings in Stanislaus County, California
