= Rouse, California =

Rouse
- census-designated place
- Position in California.
- Coordinates: 37°37′10″N 121°00′26″W
- Country: United States
- State: California
- County: Stanislaus

Area
  - Total: 0.238 sq mi (0.617 km^{2})
  - Land: 0.238 sq mi (0.617 km^{2})
  - Water: 0 sq mi (0 km^{2}) 0%
- Elevation: 89 ft (27 m)

Population (2020)
  - Total: 1,913
  - Density: 8,030/sq mi (3,100/km^{2})
- Time zone: UTC-8 (Pacific (PST))
  - Summer (DST): UTC-7 (PDT)
- GNIS feature ID: 2628786

Rouse is a census-designated place (CDP) in Stanislaus County, California, United States. Rouse sits at an elevation of 89 feet (27 m). The 2020 United States census reported Rouse's population was 1,913.

== Geography ==
According to the United States Census Bureau, the CDP covers an area of 0.2 square mile (0.6 km^{2}), all land.

== Demographics ==
Historical population
Census	Pop.	Note	%±
2010	2,005		—
2020	1,913		−4.6%
U.S. Decennial Census; 2010

Rouse first appeared as a census designated place in the 2010 U.S. census.

=== 2020 census ===
As of the 2020 census, Rouse had a population of 1,913, and the population density was 8,037.8 inhabitants per square mile (3,103.4/km^{2}). The median age was 30.8 years. The age distribution was 578 people (30.2%) under the age of 18, 196 people (10.2%) aged 18 to 24, 551 people (28.8%) aged 25 to 44, 394 people (20.6%) aged 45 to 64, and 194 people (10.1%) who were 65 years of age or older. For every 100 females, there were 114.0 males, and for every 100 females age 18 and over there were 110.6 males age 18 and over.

100.0% of residents lived in urban areas, while 0.0% lived in rural areas.

The whole population lived in households. There were 514 households, out of which 254 (49.4%) had children under the age of 18 living in them, 224 (43.6%) were married-couple households, 52 (10.1%) were cohabiting couple households, 125 (24.3%) had a female householder with no spouse or partner present, and 113 (22.0%) had a male householder with no spouse or partner present. 77 households (15.0%) were one person, and 24 (4.7%) were one person aged 65 or older. The average household size was 3.72. There were 397 families (77.2% of all households).

There were 536 housing units at an average density of 2,252.1 units per square mile (869.5 units/km^{2}), of which 514 (95.9%) were occupied. Of these, 187 (36.4%) were owner-occupied, and 327 (63.6%) were occupied by renters. Of all housing units, 4.1% were vacant. The homeowner vacancy rate was 0.5% and the rental vacancy rate was 2.4%.

Racial composition as of the 2020 census
Race	Number	Percent
White	509	26.6%
Black or African American	21	1.1%
American Indian and Alaska Native	43	2.2%
Asian	155	8.1%
Native Hawaiian and Other Pacific Islander	9	0.5%
Some other race	914	47.8%
Two or more races	262	13.7%
Hispanic or Latino (of any race)	1,377	72.0%
