= Bret Harte, California =

Bret Harte
- Unincorporated Community; Census Designated Place
- Position in California. Bret Harte (the United States)
- Coordinates: 37°36′11″N 121°0′21″W
- Country: United States
- State: California
- County: Stanislaus

Area
  - Total: 0.55 sq mi (1.43 km^{2})
  - Land: 0.55 sq mi (1.43 km^{2})
  - Water: 0 sq mi (0.00 km^{2}) 0%

Population (2020)
  - Total: 5,135
  - Density: 9,332.7/sq mi (3,603.36/km^{2})
- Time zone: UTC-8 (Pacific (PST))
  - Summer (DST): UTC-7 (PDT)
- ZIP code: 95358
- Area code: 209
- FIPS code: 06-08172
- GNIS feature ID: 2407902

Bret Harte is a census-designated place (CDP) in Stanislaus County, California, United States. The population was 5,135 at the 2020 census, down from 5,152 at the 2010 census. It is part of the Modesto Metropolitan Statistical Area. It is named for the American poet and short story writer, Bret Harte, best known for his writings about the California Gold Rush.

== Geography ==
Bret Harte is located at 37°36′11″N 121°0′21″W (37.603182, -121.005844).

According to the United States Census Bureau, the CDP has a total area of 0.5 square miles (1.3 km^{2}), all land.

== Demographics ==
Historical population
Census	Pop.	Note	%±
2000	5,161		—
2010	5,152		−0.2%
2020	5,135		−0.3%
U.S. Decennial Census; 1850–1870 1880-1890; 1900 1910 1920; 1930 1940 1950; 1960 1970 1980; 1990 2000 2010

=== 2020 census ===
As of the 2020 census, Bret Harte had a population of 5,135. The population density was 9,336.4 inhabitants per square mile (3,604.8/km^{2}). The median age was 30.1 years. The age distribution was 31.6% under the age of 18, 10.9% aged 18 to 24, 30.2% aged 25 to 44, 19.5% aged 45 to 64, and 7.8% who were 65 years of age or older. For every 100 females, there were 104.3 males, and for every 100 females age 18 and over there were 104.2 males.

The census reported that 99.4% of the population lived in households, 0.6% lived in non-institutionalized group quarters, and no one was institutionalized. The 2020 census also reported that 100.0% of residents lived in urban areas, while 0.0% lived in rural areas.

There were 1,234 households, of which 54.7% had children under the age of 18 living in them. Of all households, 53.6% were married-couple households, 9.0% were cohabiting couple households, 21.2% had a female householder with no spouse or partner present, and 16.3% had a male householder with no spouse or partner present. About 10.4% of households were one person households, and 3.2% were one person aged 65 or older. The average household size was 4.14. There were 1,039 families (84.2% of all households).

There were 1,282 housing units at an average density of 2,330.9 units per square mile (900.0 units/km^{2}), of which 96.3% were occupied and 3.7% were vacant. Of occupied units, 45.1% were owner-occupied and 54.9% were occupied by renters. The homeowner vacancy rate was 0.7%, and the rental vacancy rate was 1.2%.

Racial composition as of the 2020 census
Race	Number	Percent
White	1,134	22.1%
Black or African American	23	0.4%
American Indian and Alaska Native	129	2.5%
Asian	44	0.9%
Native Hawaiian and Other Pacific Islander	11	0.2%
Some other race	3,047	59.3%
Two or more races	747	14.5%
Hispanic or Latino (of any race)	4,524	88.1%

=== 2010 census ===
At the 2010 census Bret Harte had a population of 5,152. The population density was 9,388.7 inhabitants per square mile (3,625.0/km^{2}). The racial makeup was 2,441 (47.4%) White, 52 (1.0%) African American, 50 (1.0%) Native American, 40 (0.8%) Asian, 45 (0.9%) Pacific Islander, 2,327 (45.2%) from other races, and 197 (3.8%) from two or more races. Hispanic or Latino people of any race numbered 4,272 (82.9%).

Everyone lived in households, none in any group quarters.

There were 1,185 households, 761 (64.2%) had children under the age of 18 living in them, 649 (54.8%) were opposite-sex married couples living together, 230 (19.4%) had a female householder with no husband present, 141 (11.9%) had a male householder with no wife present. There were 130 (11.0%) unmarried opposite-sex partnerships, and 6 (0.5%) same-sex married couples or partnerships. 94 households (7.9%) were one-person and 36 (3.0%) had someone living alone who was 65 or older. The average household size was 4.35. There were 1,020 families (86.1% of households); the average family size was 4.41.

The age distribution was 1,851 people (35.9%) under the age of 18, 688 people (13.4%) aged 18 to 24, 1,457 people (28.3%) aged 25 to 44, 870 people (16.9%) aged 45 to 64, and 286 people (5.6%) who were 65 or older. The median age was 25.5 years. For every 100 females, there were 109.4 males. For every 100 females age 18 and over, there were 106.8 males.

There were 1,293 housing units at an average density of 2,356.3 per square mile, of the occupied units 555 (46.8%) were owner-occupied and 630 (53.2%) were rented. The homeowner vacancy rate was 1.9%; the rental vacancy rate was 6.9%. 2,389 people (46.4% of the population) lived in owner-occupied housing units and 2,763 people (53.6%) lived in rental housing units.

=== 2000 census ===
Bret Harte first appeared as a census designated place in the 2000 U.S. census.

== Government ==
In the California State Legislature, Bret Harte is in the 4th senatorial district, represented by Republican Marie Alvarado-Gil, and the 22nd Assembly district, represented by Republican Juan Alanis.

In the United States House of Representatives, Bret Harte is in California's 13th congressional district, represented by Democrat Adam Gray.

== See also ==
- Twain Harte, California, a CDP in Tuolumne County
