= Brett Hart =

Brett Hart may refer to:

- Professional wrestlers:
  - Bret Hart (born 1957), Canadian-American professional wrestler, billed with the spelling "Brett" by the WWF in the mid 1980s.
  - Barry Horowitz (born 1960), American professional wrestler who used the ring name "Brett Hart" in JCP 1983-1984.

== See also ==
- Bret Harte (disambiguation)
