= Valley Home, California =

Valley Home
- census-designated place
- Position in California.
- Coordinates: 37°49′40″N 120°54′55″W
- Country: United States
- State: California
- County: Stanislaus

Area
  - Total: 1.15 sq mi (2.98 km^{2})
  - Land: 1.15 sq mi (2.98 km^{2})
  - Water: 0 sq mi (0 km^{2}) 0%
- Elevation: 151 ft (46 m)

Population (2020)
  - Total: 284
  - Density: 247/sq mi (95.3/km^{2})
- Time zone: UTC-8 (Pacific (PST))
  - Summer (DST): UTC-7 (PDT)
- GNIS feature ID: 2583174

Valley Home is a census-designated place (CDP) in Stanislaus County, California. It is located about 8 miles (13 km) northwest of Oakdale, and named after the warm home feeling for the Central Valley. The town used to be named Thalheim, from originally being settled by Germans, but the town was changed to Valley Home during World War II. Valley Home sits at an elevation of 151 feet (46 m). The 2020 United States census reported Valley Home's population was 284.

== Geography ==
According to the United States Census Bureau, the CDP covers an area of 1.2 square miles (3.0 km^{2}), all land.

== Demographics ==
Historical population
| Census | Pop. | Note | %± |
|---|---|---|---|
| 2010 | 228 | | — |
| 2020 | 284 | | 24.6% |
U.S. Decennial Census; 2010

The 2020 United States census reported that Valley Home had a population of 284. The population density was 247.0 inhabitants per square mile (95.4/km^{2}). The racial makeup of Valley Home was 221 (77.8%) White, 4 (1.4%) African American, 7 (2.5%) Native American, 3 (1.1%) Asian, 0 (0.0%) Pacific Islander, 29 (10.2%) from other races, and 20 (7.0%) from two or more races. Hispanic or Latino of any race were 50 persons (17.6%).

The whole population lived in households. There were 94 households, out of which 20 (21.3%) had children under the age of 18 living in them, 66 (70.2%) were married-couple households, 0 (0.0%) were cohabiting couple households, 19 (20.2%) had a female householder with no partner present, and 9 (9.6%) had a male householder with no partner present. 16 households (17.0%) were one person, and 8 (8.5%) were one person aged 65 or older. The average household size was 3.02. There were 73 families (77.7% of all households).

The age distribution was 57 people (20.1%) under the age of 18, 16 people (5.6%) aged 18 to 24, 36 people (12.7%) aged 25 to 44, 100 people (35.2%) aged 45 to 64, and 75 people (26.4%) who were 65 years of age or older. The median age was 50.3 years. For every 100 females, there were 125.4 males.

There were 105 housing units at an average density of 91.3 units per square mile (35.3 units/km^{2}), of which 94 (89.5%) were occupied. Of these, 61 (64.9%) were owner-occupied, and 33 (35.1%) were occupied by renters.
