= Cowan, California =

Cowan
- census-designated place
- Location of Cowan in Stanislaus County, California.

- Position in California.
- Coordinates: 37°33′36″N 120°59′21″W
- Country: United States
- State: California
- County: Stanislaus

Area
  - Total: 0.14 sq mi (0.37 km^{2})
  - Land: 0.14 sq mi (0.37 km^{2})
  - Water: 0 sq mi (0.00 km^{2}) 0%
- Elevation: 75 ft (23 m)

Population (2020)
  - Total: 342
  - Density: 2,426.2/sq mi (936.76/km^{2})
- Time zone: UTC-8 (Pacific (PST))
  - Summer (DST): UTC-7 (PDT)
- ZIP code: 95358
- Area code: 209
- GNIS feature ID: 2628723

Cowan is a census-designated place (CDP) in Stanislaus County, California, United States. Cowan sits at an elevation of 75 feet (23 m). The 2020 United States census reported Cowan's population was 342.

== Geography ==
According to the United States Census Bureau, the CDP covers an area of 0.14 square mile (0.4 km^{2}), all land.

== Demographics ==
Historical population
Census	Pop.	Note	%±
2010	318		—
2020	342		7.5%
U.S. Decennial Census

=== 2020 census ===
As of the 2020 census, Cowan had a population of 342. The population density was 2,425.5 inhabitants per square mile (936.5/km^{2}). The median age was 34.0 years. The age distribution was 108 people (31.6%) under the age of 18, 26 people (7.6%) aged 18 to 24, 94 people (27.5%) aged 25 to 44, 82 people (24.0%) aged 45 to 64, and 32 people (9.4%) who were 65 years of age or older. For every 100 females, there were 97.7 males, and for every 100 females age 18 and over there were 95.0 males age 18 and over.

100.0% of residents lived in urban areas, while 0.0% lived in rural areas.

The whole population lived in households. There were 84 households, of which 38 (45.2%) had children under the age of 18 living in them. Of all households, 47 (56.0%) were married-couple households, 6 (7.1%) were cohabiting couple households, 20 (23.8%) had a male householder with no partner present, and 11 (13.1%) had a female householder with no partner present. 18 households (21.4%) were one person, and 8 (9.5%) were one person aged 65 or older. The average household size was 4.07. There were 66 families (78.6% of all households).

There were 97 housing units at an average density of 687.9 units per square mile (265.6 units/km^{2}), of which 84 (86.6%) were occupied. The homeowner vacancy rate was 0.0% and the rental vacancy rate was 10.5%. Of occupied units, 50 (59.5%) were owner-occupied, and 34 (40.5%) were occupied by renters.

Racial composition as of the 2020 census
Race	Number	Percent
White	139	40.6%
Black or African American	1	0.3%
American Indian and Alaska Native	8	2.3%
Asian	4	1.2%
Native Hawaiian and Other Pacific Islander	0	0.0%
Some other race	143	41.8%
Two or more races	47	13.7%
Hispanic or Latino (of any race)	227	66.4%
