= Monterey Park Tract, California =

Monterey Park Tract
- census-designated place
- Position in California. Monterey Park Tract (the United States)
- Coordinates: 37°31′36″N 121°00′41″W
- Country: United States
- State: California
- County: Stanislaus

Area
  - Total: 0.047 sq mi (0.122 km^{2})
  - Land: 0.047 sq mi (0.122 km^{2})
  - Water: 0 sq mi (0 km^{2}) 0%
- Elevation: 62 ft (19 m)

Population (2020)
  - Total: 164
  - Density: 3,480/sq mi (1,340/km^{2})
- Time zone: UTC-8 (Pacific (PST))
  - Summer (DST): UTC-7 (PDT)
- GNIS feature ID: 2628759

Monterey Park Tract is a census-designated place (CDP) in Stanislaus County, California, United States. Monterey Park Tract sits at an elevation of 62 feet (19 m). The 2020 United States census reported Monterey Park Tract's population was 164.

== Geography ==
According to the United States Census Bureau, the CDP covers an area of 0.05 square mile (0.12 km^{2}), all land.

== Demographics ==
Historical population
Census	Pop.	Note	%±
2010	133		—
2020	164		23.3%
U.S. Decennial Census; 2010

Monterey Park Tract first appeared as a census designated place in the 2010 U.S. census.

The 2020 United States census reported that Monterey Park Tract had a population of 164. The population density was 3,489.4 inhabitants per square mile (1,347.3/km^{2}). The racial makeup of the CDP was 53 (32.3%) White, 12 (7.3%) African American, 4 (2.4%) Native American, 1 (0.6%) Asian, 0 (0.0%) Pacific Islander, 64 (39.0%) from other races, and 30 (18.3%) from two or more races. Hispanic or Latino of any race were 121 persons (73.8%).

The whole population lived in households. There were 45 households, out of which 22 (48.9%) had children under the age of 18 living in them, 26 (57.8%) were married-couple households, 4 (8.9%) were cohabiting couple households, 9 (20.0%) had a female householder with no partner present, and 6 (13.3%) had a male householder with no partner present. 7 households (15.6%) were one person, and 2 (4.4%) were one person aged 65 or older. The average household size was 3.64. There were 37 families (82.2% of all households).

The age distribution was 49 people (29.9%) under the age of 18, 26 people (15.9%) aged 18 to 24, 41 people (25.0%) aged 25 to 44, 36 people (22.0%) aged 45 to 64, and 12 people (7.3%) who were 65 years of age or older. The median age was 26.6 years. There were 79 males and 85 females.

There were 45 housing units at an average density of 957.4 units per square mile (369.7 units/km^{2}), of which 45 (100.0%) were occupied. Of these, 26 (57.8%) were owner-occupied, and 19 (42.2%) were occupied by renters.
