= Del Rio, California =

- Unincorporated community Census-designated place
- Location in Stanislaus County and the state of California

- Location within California Location within the United States
- Coordinates: 37°44′47″N 121°0′42″W
- Country: United States
- State: California
- County: Stanislaus

Area
  - Total: 2.05 sq mi (5.31 km^{2})
  - Land: 2.00 sq mi (5.17 km^{2})
  - Water: 0.054 sq mi (0.14 km^{2}) 2.57%
- Elevation: 128 ft (39 m)

Population (2020)
  - Total: 1,399
  - Density: 700.4/sq mi (270.42/km^{2})
- Time zone: UTC-8 (Pacific (PST))
  - Summer (DST): UTC-7 (PDT)
- ZIP code: 95367
- Area code: 209
- FIPS code: 06-18695
- GNIS feature ID: 1853384

Del Rio (Spanish: Del Río, meaning "Of The River") is an unincorporated community in Stanislaus County, California, United States that is located around the Del Rio Country Club. The population was 1,399 at the 2020 census, up from 1,270 at the 2010 census. For statistical purposes, the United States Census Bureau has defined the community as a census-designated place (CDP). It is part of the Modesto Metropolitan Statistical Area.

== Geography ==
According to the United States Census Bureau, the CDP has a total area of 2.05 square miles (5.3 km^{2}), of which 2.0 square miles (5.2 km^{2}) is land and 0.05 square miles (0.13 km^{2}) (2.57%) is water.

== Demographics ==
Historical population
Census	Pop.	Note	%±
2000	1,168		—
2010	1,270		8.7%
2020	1,399		10.2%
U.S. Decennial Census; 1860–1870 1880-1890; 1900 1910 1920; 1930 1940 1950; 1960 1970 1980; 1990 2000 2010

Del Rio first appeared as a census designated place in the 2000 U.S. census.

=== 2020 census ===
As of the 2020 census, Del Rio had a population of 1,399. The population density was 700.6 inhabitants per square mile (270.5/km^{2}). The age distribution was 270 people (19.3%) under the age of 18, 103 people (7.4%) aged 18 to 24, 222 people (15.9%) aged 25 to 44, 451 people (32.2%) aged 45 to 64, and 353 people (25.2%) who were 65 years of age or older. The median age was 50.7 years. For every 100 females, there were 98.2 males, and for every 100 females age 18 and over, there were 96.7 males age 18 and over.

83.5% of residents lived in urban areas, while 16.5% lived in rural areas.

The Census reported that the whole population lived in households. There were 510 households, of which 27.6% had children under the age of 18 living in them. Of all households, 69.0% were married-couple households, 3.3% were cohabiting couple households, 10.2% were households with a male householder and no spouse or partner present, and 17.5% were households with a female householder and no spouse or partner present. About 17.5% of all households were made up of individuals and 9.2% had someone living alone who was 65 years of age or older. The average household size was 2.74. There were 408 families (80.0% of all households).

There were 540 housing units at an average density of 270.4 units per square mile (104.4 units/km^{2}), of which 510 (94.4%) were occupied. Of these, 471 (92.4%) were owner-occupied, and 39 (7.6%) were occupied by renters. 5.6% of housing units were vacant. The homeowner vacancy rate was 2.5% and the rental vacancy rate was 20.4%.

Racial composition as of the 2020 census
Race	Number	Percent
White	866	61.9%
Black or African American	24	1.7%
American Indian and Alaska Native	0	0.0%
Asian	227	16.2%
Native Hawaiian and Other Pacific Islander	13	0.9%
Some other race	121	8.6%
Two or more races	148	10.6%
Hispanic or Latino (of any race)	221	15.8%

=== Income and poverty ===
In 2023, the US Census Bureau estimated that the median household income was $194,083, and the per capita income was $113,255. About 0.0% of families and 0.0% of the population were below the poverty line.

=== 2010 census ===
The 2010 United States census reported that Del Rio had a population of 1,270. The population density was 611.8 inhabitants per square mile (236.2/km^{2}). The racial makeup of Del Rio was 1,027 (80.9%) White, 25 (2.0%) African American, 5 (0.4%) Native American, 143 (11.3%) Asian, 1 (0.1%) Pacific Islander, 27 (2.1%) from other races, and 42 (3.3%) from two or more races. Hispanic or Latino of any race were 107 persons (8.4%).

The Census reported that 1,270 people (100% of the population) lived in households, 0 (0%) lived in non-institutionalized group quarters, and 0 (0%) were institutionalized.

There were 485 households, out of which 144 (29.7%) had children under the age of 18 living in them, 359 (74.0%) were opposite-sex married couples living together, 27 (5.6%) had a female householder with no husband present, 12 (2.5%) had a male householder with no wife present. There were 14 (2.9%) unmarried opposite-sex partnerships, and 1 (0.2%) same-sex married couples or partnerships. 72 households (14.8%) were made up of individuals, and 40 (8.2%) had someone living alone who was 65 years of age or older. The average household size was 2.62. There were 398 families (82.1% of all households); the average family size was 2.89.

The population was spread out, with 254 people (20.0%) under the age of 18, 72 people (5.7%) aged 18 to 24, 175 people (13.8%) aged 25 to 44, 523 people (41.2%) aged 45 to 64, and 246 people (19.4%) who were 65 years of age or older. The median age was 50.6 years. For every 100 females, there were 96.3 males. For every 100 females age 18 and over, there were 94.3 males.

There were 515 housing units at an average density of 248.1 per square mile (95.8/km^{2}), of which 454 (93.6%) were owner-occupied, and 31 (6.4%) were occupied by renters. The homeowner vacancy rate was 3.0%; the rental vacancy rate was 5.9%. 1,187 people (93.5% of the population) lived in owner-occupied housing units and 83 people (6.5%) lived in rental housing units.

== History ==
Del Rio has been subject to a number of planning activities, beginning with the 1992 analysis by Stanislaus County regarding the projected growth impacts of this area. This plan, an integral part of the county General Plan, emphasized a continuation of the low density development of the Del Rio area, with balanced uses based upon the historic residential, agricultural and open space precedent land uses. The plan included prioritization of high quality residential development and the undergrounding of all utility infrastructure.

In regard to environmental factors the 1992 plan called for extensive protection of riparian zones along the Stanislaus River. The plan also analyzed air quality impacts of future land development and transportation change; these studies were carried out in a companion document prepared by Earthmetrics, and these analyses were used to size the future roadway system and intersection controls.

== Government ==
In the California State Legislature, Del Rio is in the 4th senatorial district, represented by Republican Marie Alvarado-Gil, and the 9th Assembly district, represented by Republican Heath Flora.

In the United States House of Representatives, Del Rio is in California's 5th congressional district, represented by Republican Tom McClintock.
