= Diablo Grande, California =

- Unincorporated community Census-designated place
- Location of Diablo Grande in Stanislaus County, California.

- Position in California. Diablo Grande, California (the United States)
- Coordinates: 37°23′51″N 121°16′46″W
- Country: United States
- State: California
- County: Stanislaus

Area
  - Total: 4.31 sq mi (11.16 km^{2})
  - Land: 4.30 sq mi (11.13 km^{2})
  - Water: 0.0077 sq mi (0.02 km^{2}) 0.22%
- Elevation: 1,535 ft (468 m)

Population (2020)
  - Total: 1,669
  - Density: 388.3/sq mi (149.93/km^{2})
- Time zone: UTC-8 (Pacific (PST))
  - Summer (DST): UTC-7 (PDT)
- ZIP code: 95363
- Area code: 209
- GNIS feature ID: 2582995
- Website: www.diablogrande.com

Diablo Grande is an unincorporated community in Stanislaus County, California, United States. It is a gated bedroom community nestled in the Diablo Range, whence it gets its name. Diablo Grande sits at an elevation of 1,535 feet (468 m). It is about 9 miles (14 km) southwest of Patterson. For statistical purposes, the United States Census Bureau has defined that community as a census-designated place (CDP). The 2020 United States census reported Diablo Grande's population was 1,669.

== Background ==
The preliminary plans for a gated community and golf resort to be developed by Don Panoz were distributed in May 1990. The project was approved by the Stanislaus County Board of Supervisors in the fall of 1993. By 1999, the Stanislaus County superior court had rejected Diablo Grande's second environmental impact report with the argument that it had failed to properly protect the surrounding environment and there was no answer to where water would come from due to the area not containing adequate on-site water. In response, Diablo Grande created the Western Hills Water District to serve the community. Water transfers from former agriculture land to the community were arranged and 12,000 acres (4,900 ha) were preserved for wildlife.

Developer Donald Panoz envisioned Diablo Grande to consist of 5,000 to 10,000 homes, a resort hotel and spa, six golf courses, an equestrian center, vineyards, a winery and commercial properties, including a high-tech research park. After investing $120 million into Diablo Grande and the 2008 financial crisis occurring, the investors of the community filed for chapter 11 bankruptcy on March 10, 2008. There were more than $54 million in unpaid debts and 70 out of the 350 homes built faced foreclosure.

In October 2008, World International LLC purchased Diablo Grande for $20 million. The California Department of Health temporarily suspended new building permits in January 2009 when water tests showed trihalomethane levels at 0.103 milligrams per liter vs. the state standard of 0.080 milligrams per liter.

Diablo Grande's Legends golf course, designed by Jack Nicklaus and Gene Sarazen, was closed in March 2014 due to the drought in California.

In May 2017, the Stanislaus County Board of Supervisors approved a revised plan for the community. An additional 1,000 single-family homes could be built by reducing the number of condos and townhouses and eliminating apartments. Also, instead of building homes spread along the hillsides, residential areas were grouped together, leaving more open terrain and walking trails. The revised plan brought the total number of housing units to 2,354.

By the fall of 2019, it was announced that the remaining golf course at Diablo Grande would close in October. It was also revealed that World International has outstanding tax bills on about half of its 340 parcels at Diablo Grande, totaling more than $6 million, and is looking for a new owner.

On May 7, 2020, World International, LLC sold substantially all of its property within the Phase 1 development area of the District to Angel’s Crossing, LLC.

On August 19, 2020 at 3:00 PM Pacific Time, due to the SCU Lightning Complex fires of 2020, the California Department of Forestry and Fire Prevention issued an evacuation order of Diablo Grande. The evacuation order was lifted on August 20, 2020 at 2:00 PM.

== Geography ==
According to the United States Census Bureau, the CDP covers an area of 4.3 square miles (11.2 km^{2}), 99.78% of it land and 0.22% of it water.

== Demographics ==
Historical population
Census	Pop.	Note	%±
2010	826		—
2020	1,669		102.1%
U.S. Decennial Census

=== 2020 census ===
As of the 2020 census, Diablo Grande had a population of 1,669. The population density was 388.3 inhabitants per square mile (149.9/km^{2}). The median age was 38.4 years, and the age distribution was 426 people (25.5%) under the age of 18, 118 people (7.1%) aged 18 to 24, 432 people (25.9%) aged 25 to 44, 451 people (27.0%) aged 45 to 64, and 242 people (14.5%) who were 65 years of age or older. For every 100 females, there were 103.0 males, and for every 100 females age 18 and over, there were 100.5 males age 18 and over.

0.0% of residents lived in urban areas, while 100.0% lived in rural areas. The whole population lived in households. There were 583 households, of which 211 (36.2%) had children under the age of 18 living in them, 363 (62.3%) were married-couple households, 46 (7.9%) were cohabiting couple households, 69 (11.8%) had a female householder with no spouse or partner present, and 105 (18.0%) had a male householder with no spouse or partner present. About 102 households (17.5%) were one person, and 44 (7.5%) were one person aged 65 or older. The average household size was 2.86. There were 445 families (76.3% of all households).

There were 632 housing units at an average density of 147.0 units per square mile (56.8 units/km^{2}), of which 583 (92.2%) were occupied. Of these, 496 (85.1%) were owner-occupied and 87 (14.9%) were occupied by renters. 7.8% of housing units were vacant. The homeowner vacancy rate was 2.4% and the rental vacancy rate was 7.1%.

Racial composition as of the 2020 census
Race	Number	Percent
White	714	42.8%
Black or African American	147	8.8%
American Indian and Alaska Native	18	1.1%
Asian	212	12.7%
Native Hawaiian and Other Pacific Islander	6	0.4%
Some other race	279	16.7%
Two or more races	293	17.6%
Hispanic or Latino (of any race)	614	36.8%

=== Income and poverty ===
In 2023, the US Census Bureau estimated that the median household income was $160,741, and the per capita income was $50,331. About 4.0% of families and 2.8% of the population were below the poverty line.
