= Riverbank High School =

High school in California, United States

Location
- 6200 Claus Road; Riverbank, California 95367; United States
- Coordinates: 37.7313°N 120.9212°W

Information
- Type: Public
- School district: Riverbank Unified School District
- Teaching staff: 40.23 (FTE)
- Grades: 9–12
- Enrollment: 788 (2023–2024)
- Student to teacher ratio: 19.59
- Colors: Maroon and gray
- Athletics: CIF
- Mascot: Bruins
- Website: https://rhs.riverbank.k12.ca.us/

Riverbank High School is a public high school located in Riverbank, California, serving students in grades 9 through 12. It is part of the Riverbank Unified School District.

== Overview ==
Riverbank High School provides students with opportunities to engage in Advanced Placement (AP) courses, with a participation rate of 21%. As of the most recent data, 88% of the student body identifies as a minority, and 55% are classified as economically disadvantaged. The school has a graduation rate of 97%.

Student Demographics

- Total Enrollment: 784
- Gender Distribution: 51% female, 49% male
- Minority Enrollment: 88%
  - Hispanic: 83.4%
  - White: 12.1%
  - Other: 4.5%

== Athletics ==
Riverbank High School participates in the California Interscholastic Federation (CIF). The school’s teams are known as the Bruins. In 2008, athlete German Fernandez set a national record in the 3200-meter run and won state championships in the 1600 meters (4:00.29) and 3200 meters (8:34.23). He later broke the two-mile record at the Nike Outdoor Nationals.

== Extracurriculars ==
Riverbank High School’s Colorguard participated in the World Guard competition during the 2008–2009 season.

== See also ==
- Riverbank High School
