= Parklawn, California =

Parklawn
- census-designated place
- Position in California.
- Coordinates: 37°36′26″N 120°58′43″W
- Country: United States
- State: California
- County: Stanislaus

Area
  - Total: 0.133 sq mi (0.345 km^{2})
  - Land: 0.133 sq mi (0.345 km^{2})
  - Water: 0 sq mi (0 km^{2}) 0%
- Elevation: 92 ft (28 m)

Population (2020)
  - Total: 1,249
  - Density: 9,380/sq mi (3,620/km^{2})
- Time zone: UTC-8 (Pacific (PST))
  - Summer (DST): UTC-7 (PDT)
- GNIS feature ID: 2628771

Parklawn is a census-designated place (CDP) in Stanislaus County, California, United States. Parklawn sits at an elevation of 92 feet (28 m). The 2020 United States census reported Parklawn's population was 1,249.

== Geography ==
According to the United States Census Bureau, the CDP covers an area of 0.13 square mile (0.35 km^{2}), all land.

At the 2010 census, the CDP covered an area of 0.17 square mile (0.44 km^{2}), all land.

== Demographics ==
Historical population
Census	Pop.	Note	%±
2010	1,337		—
2020	1,249		−6.6%
U.S. Decennial Census; 2010

=== 2020 census ===
As of the 2020 census, Parklawn had a population of 1,249 and a population density of 9,391.0 inhabitants per square mile (3,625.9/km^{2}).

The census reported that 1,233 people (98.7% of the population) lived in households, 16 (1.3%) lived in non-institutionalized group quarters, and no one was institutionalized. As of the 2020 census, 100.0% of residents lived in urban areas, while 0.0% lived in rural areas.

There were 328 households, out of which 151 (46.0%) had children under the age of 18 living in them, 148 (45.1%) were married-couple households, 34 (10.4%) were cohabiting couple households, 68 (20.7%) had a female householder with no partner present, and 78 (23.8%) had a male householder with no partner present. 57 households (17.4%) were one person, and 14 (4.3%) were one person aged 65 or older. The average household size was 3.76. There were 256 families (78.0% of all households).

The age distribution was 373 people (29.9%) under the age of 18, 149 people (11.9%) aged 18 to 24, 339 people (27.1%) aged 25 to 44, 258 people (20.7%) aged 45 to 64, and 130 people (10.4%) who were 65 years of age or older. The median age was 32.0 years. For every 100 females, there were 98.3 males, and for every 100 females age 18 and over there were 96.9 males age 18 and over.

There were 343 housing units at an average density of 2,578.9 units per square mile (995.7 units/km^{2}), of which 328 (95.6%) were occupied. Of these, 151 (46.0%) were owner-occupied, and 177 (54.0%) were occupied by renters. Of all housing units, 4.4% were vacant. The homeowner vacancy rate was 0.0% and the rental vacancy rate was 6.3%.

Racial composition as of the 2020 census
Race	Number	Percent
White	302	24.2%
Black or African American	5	0.4%
American Indian and Alaska Native	20	1.6%
Asian	10	0.8%
Native Hawaiian and Other Pacific Islander	0	0.0%
Some other race	759	60.8%
Two or more races	153	12.2%
Hispanic or Latino (of any race)	1,077	86.2%

=== 2010 census ===
Parklawn first appeared as a census designated place in the 2010 U.S. census.
