= Orange Blossom, California =

- Unincorporated community Census-designated place
- Location within California Location within the United States
- Coordinates: 37°48′48″N 120°43′4″W
- Country: United States
- State: California
- County: Stanislaus

Area
  - Total: 3.97 sq mi (10.29 km^{2})
  - Land: 3.82 sq mi (9.89 km^{2})
  - Water: 0.15 sq mi (0.40 km^{2})
- Elevation: 200 ft (61 m)

Population (2020)
  - Total: 1,068
  - Density: 280/sq mi (108/km^{2})
- Time zone: UTC-8 (Pacific (PST))
  - Summer (DST): UTC-7 (PDT)
- ZIP Code: 95361 (Oakdale)
- Area code: 209
- FIPS code: 06-53987
- GNIS feature ID: 2805269

Orange Blossom is an unincorporated community and census-designated place (CDP) in Stanislaus County, California, United States. As of the 2020 census, Orange Blossom had a population of 1,068. It is located along Orange Blossom Road in the northern part of the county, on the north side of the Stanislaus River. It is bordered to the east by Knights Ferry and to the west by East Oakdale, and it is 7 miles (11 km) east of Oakdale, the nearest city.

== Demographics ==
Historical population
Census	Pop.	Note	%±
2020	1,068		—
U.S. Decennial Census; 1850–1870 1880-1890; 1900 1910 1920; 1930 1940 1950; 1960 1970 1980; 1990 2000 2010; 2020

Orange Blossom first appeared as a census designated place in the 2020 U.S. census.

=== 2020 census ===
As of the 2020 census, Orange Blossom had a population of 1,068. The median age was 51.4 years. 18.9% of residents were under the age of 18 and 22.7% of residents were 65 years of age or older. For every 100 females there were 119.3 males, and for every 100 females age 18 and over there were 120.4 males age 18 and over.

0.0% of residents lived in urban areas, while 100.0% lived in rural areas.

There were 389 households in Orange Blossom, of which 27.2% had children under the age of 18 living in them. Of all households, 57.8% were married-couple households, 14.7% were households with a male householder and no spouse or partner present, and 23.1% were households with a female householder and no spouse or partner present. About 21.1% of all households were made up of individuals and 11.6% had someone living alone who was 65 years of age or older.

There were 413 housing units, of which 5.8% were vacant. The homeowner vacancy rate was 0.0% and the rental vacancy rate was 11.5%.

Orange Blossom CDP, California – Racial and ethnic composition Note: the US Census treats Hispanic/Latino as an ethnic category. This table excludes Latinos from the racial categories and assigns them to a separate category. Hispanics/Latinos may be of any race.
Race / Ethnicity (NH = Non-Hispanic)	Pop 2020	% 2020
White alone (NH)	797	74.63%
Black or African American alone (NH)	1	0.09%
Native American or Alaska Native alone (NH)	0	0.00%
Asian alone (NH)	17	1.59%
Pacific Islander alone (NH)	0	0.00%
Other race alone (NH)	3	0.28%
Mixed race or Multiracial (NH)	79	7.40%
Hispanic or Latino (any race)	171	16.01%
Total	1,068	100.00%
