= Riverbank Unified School District =

School district in California, United States

Address
- 6715 Seventh Street Riverbank, California, 95367; United States

District information
- Type: Public
- Grades: K–12
- NCES District ID: 0600061

Students and staff
- Students: 2,940 (2020–2021)
- Teachers: 137.63 (FTE)
- Staff: 155.49 (FTE)
- Student–teacher ratio: 21.36:1

Other information
- Website: www.riverbank.k12.ca.us

Riverbank Unified School District is a public school district in Stanislaus County, California, United States.
