= Modesto City–County Airport =

Modesto City–County Airport Harry Sham Field
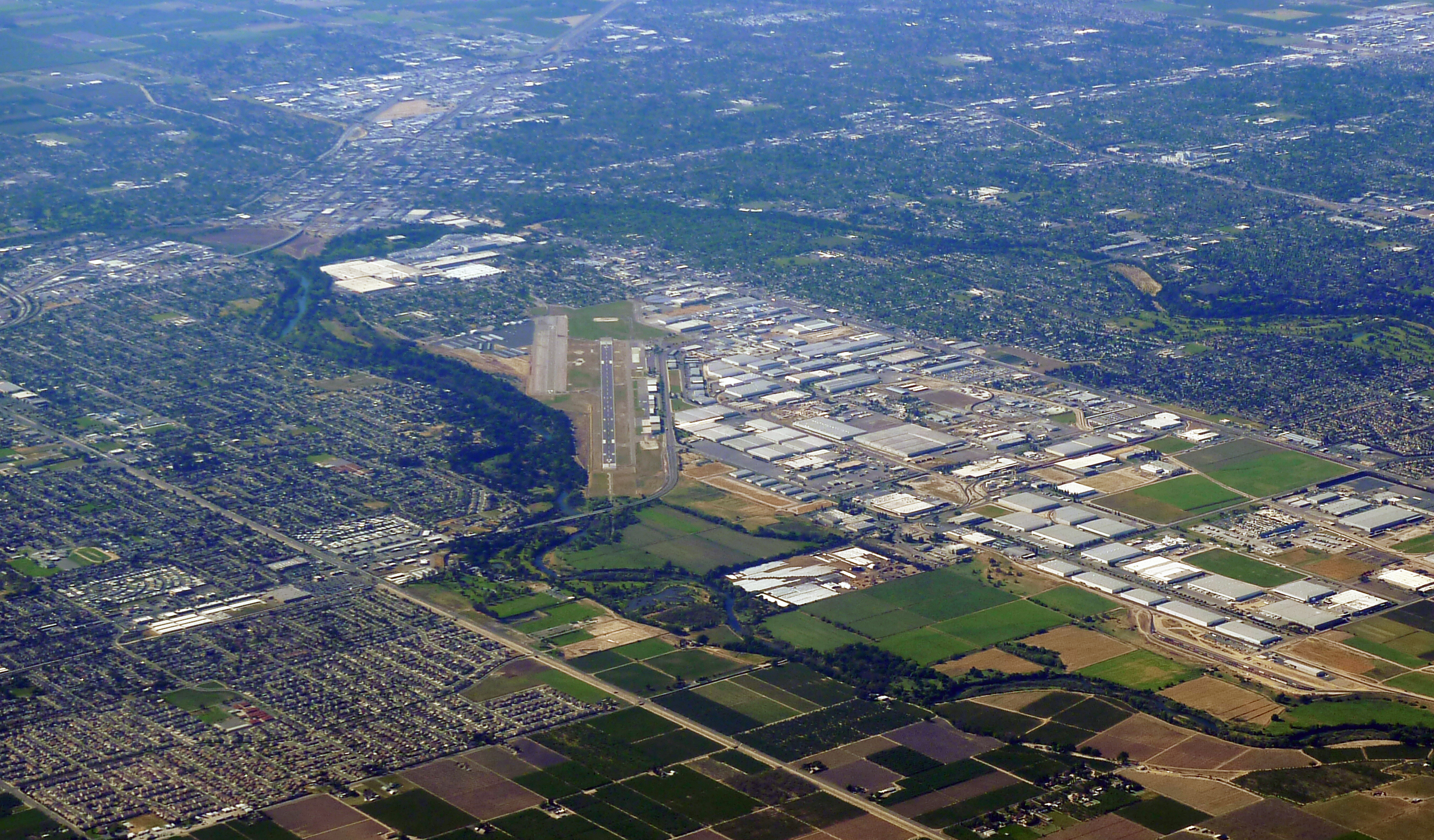
- 2015 photo

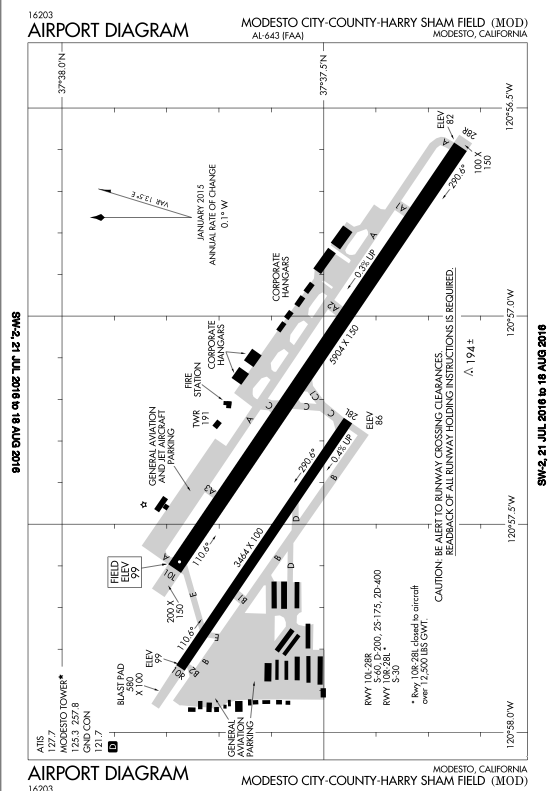
- IATA: MOD; ICAO: KMOD; FAA LID: MOD

Summary
- Airport type: Public
- Operator: City of Modesto
- Location: Modesto, California
- Elevation AMSL: 99 ft / 30 m
- Coordinates: 37°37′33″N 120°57′16″W

Map

Runways
Direction	Length		Surface
Direction	ft	m	Surface
10L/28R	5,904	1,800	Asphalt
10R/28L	3,464	1,056	Asphalt

Modesto City–County Airport (IATA: MOD, ICAO: KMOD, FAA LID: MOD) (Harry Sham Field) is two miles (3 km) southeast of Modesto in Stanislaus County, California, United States.

== History ==
Modesto City–County Airport was the nation's first municipally owned airport, opening in 1918. At first, the airport southeast of, downtown Modesto was only 82 acres (33 ha); it moved in 1929 to the current location. On February 20, 1941, the city council voted to lease more land in order to obtain $185,000 in improvements by the Federal New Deal agency the Works Progress Administration (WPA). Over the years it grew to its present size of 435 acres (176 ha). The airport started with a single runway; a second was added in the 1950s. During World War II the airport was Modesto Auxiliary Airfield (No 3), and was an auxiliary training airfield for Stockton Army Airfield.

It was named Modesto Municipal Airport. On May 25, 1955, when Stanislaus County and the City of Modesto became partners in the airport, it was renamed Modesto City–County Airport. In October 1974 Harry Sham Field was added to the name to honor the airport manager that served from 1949 to 1968.

Scheduled passenger flights started in 1946 when United Airlines opened its new terminal and began the Valley Queen service. United served Modesto with Douglas DC-3s, Convair 340s and Douglas DC-6s and began Boeing 737-200 flights in 1968. United dropped Modesto in the winter of 1979–80, after the deregulation of the airline industry. Pacific Express flew BAC One-Elevens to Modesto in the 1980s.

On October 12, 1991, the Modesto City Council and Stanislaus Board of Supervisors rededicated the remodeled passenger terminal that was enlarged to 8,900 square feet (830 m^{2}). The remodeling project upgraded the building built by United Airlines.

In the 1990s, corporate and business aviation became the fastest growing activity at the airport; in 2001, Modesto was the base for at least eight corporate jets.

In mid-2006, United Express/SkyWest Airlines added four flights a day to/from LAX and a flight to SFO, to total five flights a day to San Francisco. Passenger counts had continued to grow. In 2002, passenger counts averaged 3,035 per month; over the first six months of 2007, passengers averaged 7,739 per month. In 2007, Modesto set a record: 51,587 passengers boarded.

In June 2008, SkyWest Airlines (United Express) flights to Los Angeles ended, and, on June 4, 2014, the airline ended its flights to San Francisco, leaving the airport with no airline flights.

In 2023, the Airport hosted the Commemorative Air Force Central California Valley Squadron which showcased planes from World War II.

== Facilities ==
The airport has two runways:

- 10L/28R: 5,904 x 150 ft (1,780 x 46 m) asphalt, pavements 60/200/400, HIRL, MALSR, PCL 9:00 p.m. – 7:00 a.m. (freq 125.3) VASI – RW 10L
- 10R/28L: 3,464 x 100 ft (1,056 x 30 m) asphalt, pavements 30/-/-, MIRL, not available when tower closed, PAPI – RW 10R/28L

== See also ==
- California World War II Army Airfields
