= Juan Alanis (politician) =

American politician

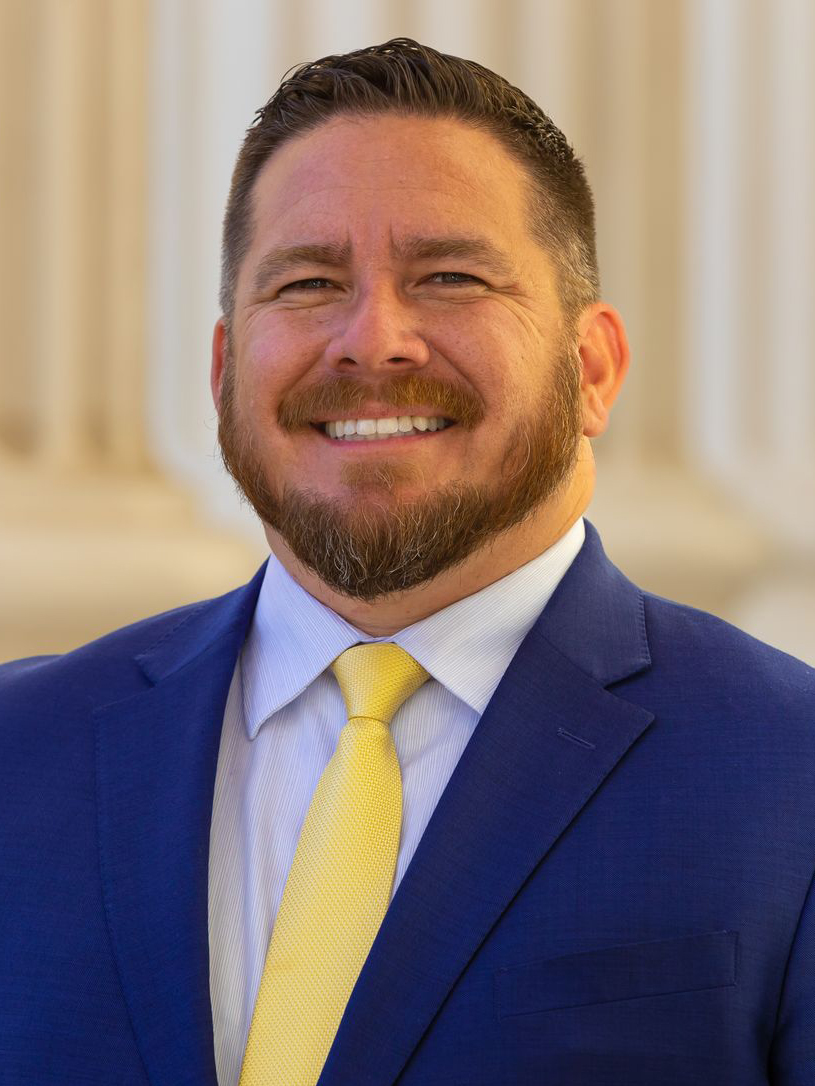
- Official portrait, 2023

Member of the California State Assembly from the 22nd district
- Incumbent
- Assumed office December 5, 2022
- Preceded by: Kevin Mullin (redistricted)

Personal details
- Born: June 17, 1978 (age 48) Modesto, California
- Party: Republican
- Spouse: Barbara Alanis
- Children: 3
- Education: California State University, Stanislaus (B.A.)
- Profession: Politician, sheriff

Juan Alanis (born June 17, 1978) is an American Republican politician who is currently serving in the California State Assembly for the 22nd district since 2022. Previously, he was a sergeant with the Stanislaus County Sheriff's Department from 1995 to 2022.

== Early life and education ==
Alanis was born on June 17, 1978, in Modesto, California, growing up in the neighboring city of Riverbank. As a sophomore at Riverbank High School, he joined the Junior Reserve Officers' Training Corps. With the help of a resource officer, he was hired as a part-time employee of the Sheriff's office as part of the Sheriff's Explorers Program. He later attended Modesto Junior College and California State University, Stanislaus, where he graduated with a bachelor's degree in 2017.

== Political career ==
In 2017, he announced his candidacy for Stanislaus County Sheriff-Coroner to succeed Adam Christianson, going against Patterson Police Chief Jeff Dirkse. In the June 5, 2018 primary Alanis lost with 48.13% to Dirkse's 51.63%; a majority in a nonpartisan California primary elects the winner and no general election is required.

In 2021, Alanis again announced his candidacy for sheriff-coroner against Dirkse, but after the newly redrawn 22nd State Assembly District brought Modesto within its boundaries, Alanis withdrew from the rematch with Dirkse and announced his candidacy for the Assembly. After winning the 2022 Republican primary, Alanis faced Democrat Jessica Self in the general election; Alanis defeated Self, 57.24%-42.76%, to win the Assembly seat. He was sworn in on December 5, 2022, and was placed on the Public Safety, Agriculture, and Water committees.

== Electoral history ==
=== Stanislaus County Sheriff ===
2018 Stanislaus County Sheriff election
Candidate	Votes	%
Jeff Dirkse	41,670	51.75
Juan Alanis	38,846	48.25
Total votes	80,516	100.00

=== California State Assembly ===
2022 California State Assembly 22nd district election
Primary election
Party	Candidate	Votes	%
Republican	Juan Alanis	23,453	36.5
Democratic	Jessica Self	17,315	27.0
Democratic	Chad M. Condit	13,015	20.3
Republican	Joel Gutierrez Campos	8,160	12.7
Republican	Lupita Salazar	2,250	3.5
Total votes		64,193	100.0
General election
Republican	Juan Alanis	60,338	58.1
Democratic	Jessica Self	43,526	41.9
Total votes		103,864	100.0
Republican gain from Democratic			

2024 California State Assembly 22nd district election
Primary election
Party	Candidate	Votes	%
Republican	Juan Alanis (incumbent)	35,392	57.6
Democratic	Jessica Self	26,015	42.4
Total votes		61,407	100.0
General election
Republican	Juan Alanis (incumbent)	86,858	56.2
Democratic	Jessica Self	67,743	43.8
Total votes		154,601	100.0
Republican hold			
