= Stanislaus County Sheriff's Department =

County law enforcement agency in California, US

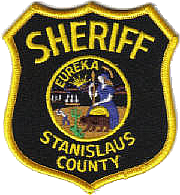
- Patch of the Stanislaus County Sheriff's Department

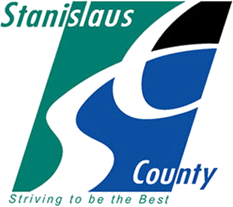
- Seal of Stanislaus County, California
- Common name: Stanislaus County Sheriff
- Abbreviation: SCSD

Jurisdictional structure
- Operations jurisdiction: Stanislaus County, California, California, U.S.
- Map of Stanislaus County Sheriff's Department's jurisdiction
- Population: 525,491
- General nature: Local civilian police

Operational structure
- Headquarters: Stanislaus County, California
- Agency executive: Jeff Dirkse, Sheriff-Coroner

Website
- www.SCSDonline.com

The Stanislaus County Sheriff's Department (SCSD) is an American law enforcement agency that is charged with law enforcement duties within the boundaries of Stanislaus County, California. As of the 2020 United States census, the county was inhabited by just under 552,880 people. (Note: Exact total: 552,878.)

== History ==
In 2012, Deputy Robert Paris and civilian locksmith Glendon David Engert were shot and killed while attempting an eviction. The shooter, James Ferrario, 45 years old, subsequently shot and killed himself.

In April 2012, a member of the sheriff's department stun-gunned and fatally shot an unarmed man suffering from mental illness.

On November 13, 2016, Deputy Dennis Wallace was murdered in Fox Grove Park near the City of Hughson by David Machado. Sheriff Adam Christianson reported the gun used was in contact with Deputy Wallace's head when it was fired. Prosecutors are seeking the death penalty for Machado.

== Line of duty deaths ==
Since the department's establishment, 6 sworn deputies have died in the line of duty, as well as 2 non-sworn members;1 Crime Scene Technician and 1 Community Service officer.

Sworn Deputies:

Name	Rank	Date of death	Cause
Harold Lee Thorton	Deputy Sheriff	23 Aug 1967	Gunfire
Billy Joe Dickens	Deputy Sheriff	27 Jan 1970	Gunfire
Robert Lee Paris, Jr.	Deputy Sheriff	12 Apr 2012	Gunfire
Dennis Randall Wallace	Deputy Sheriff	13 Nov 2016	Gunfire
Jason Allen Garner	Deputy Sheriff	13 May 2017	Automobile Accident
Tony Hinostroza,III	Deputy Sheriff	25 Nov 2018	Automobile Accident

Non-Sworn members:

Name	Rank	Date of death	Cause
Mary Ann Donahou	Crime Scene Investigation Technician	30 Dec 2011	Struck by vehicle
Raschel Johnson	Community Service Officer (CSO)	13 May 2017	Automobile Accident
