= Irwin, California =

Unincorporated community in California, United States

Irwin
- Unincorporated community
- Location in California Irwin (the United States)
- Coordinates: 37°23′49″N 120°51′00″W
- Country: United States
- State: California
- County: Merced
- Elevation: 98 ft (30 m)

Irwin is an unincorporated community in Merced County, California, United States. It is located 4.5 miles (7.2 km) west-northwest of Delhi and approximately 1 mile (1.6 km) south of Hilmar, at an elevation of 98 feet (30 m). For census purposes, Irwin is aggregated with nearby communities in the census-designated place Hilmar-Irwin, California.

A post office operated at Irwin from 1911 to 1958. The name honors W.A. Irwin, founder of the town.

In the early twentieth century, Irwin had a schoolhouse with several teachers, three churches, a hotel, and two cream shipping stations. Much of the population of the time was of Swedish descent.
