= Hilmar-Irwin, California =

- Census-designated place
- Location in Merced County, California

- Location in the United States
- Coordinates: 37°24′30″N 120°51′03″W
- Country: United States
- State: California
- County: Merced

Area
  - Total: 3.928 sq mi (10.173 km^{2})
  - Land: 3.928 sq mi (10.173 km^{2})
  - Water: 0 sq mi (0 km^{2}) 0%

Population (2020)
  - Total: 5,164
  - Density: 1,315/sq mi (507.6/km^{2})
- Time zone: UTC-8 (Pacific (PST))
  - Summer (DST): UTC-7 (PDT)
- ZIP code: 95324 (Hilmar)
- Area code: 209
- FIPS code: 06-33861

Hilmar-Irwin is a census-designated place (CDP) in Merced County, California, United States. As of the 2020 census, the population was 5,164.

== Geography ==
Hilmar-Irwin is located in northern Merced County at 37°24′30″N 120°51′3″W. It is 6 miles (10 km) west-southwest of Delhi, 8 miles (13 km) west-northwest of Livingston, and 6 miles (10 km) south of Turlock.

According to the United States Census Bureau, the CDP has a total area of 3.9 square miles (10 km^{2}), all land.

It is home to the Hilmar Cheese Company, a cheese manufacturer that offers public tours.

=== Climate ===
Hilmar-Irwin has hot, mostly dry summers and cool, wet winters. Average January temperatures are a maximum of 54.0 °F (12.2 °C) and a minimum of 40.0 °F (4.4 °C).

Climate data for Hilmar
Month	Jan	Feb	Mar	Apr	May	Jun	Jul	Aug	Sep	Oct	Nov	Dec	Year
Record high °F (°C)	75 (24)	78 (26)	87 (31)	96 (36)	102 (39)	111 (44)	114 (46)	113 (45)	105 (41)	98 (37)	84 (29)	72 (22)	114 (46)
Mean daily maximum °F (°C)	54 (12)	61 (16)	67 (19)	73 (23)	81 (27)	88 (31)	94 (34)	92 (33)	87 (31)	77 (25)	64 (18)	54 (12)	74 (23)
Daily mean °F (°C)	47.5 (8.6)	52 (11)	57 (14)	61.5 (16.4)	68 (20)	74 (23)	78.5 (25.8)	77 (25)	73.5 (23.1)	65.5 (18.6)	54.5 (12.5)	46.5 (8.1)	63.0 (17.2)
Mean daily minimum °F (°C)	40 (4)	43 (6)	46 (8)	49 (9)	55 (13)	60 (16)	63 (17)	62 (17)	59 (15)	53 (12)	44 (7)	39 (4)	51 (11)
Record low °F (°C)	18 (−8)	21 (−6)	25 (−4)	28 (−2)	34 (1)	40 (4)	43 (6)	41 (5)	37 (3)	32 (0)	22 (−6)	3 (−16)	3 (−16)
Average rainfall inches (mm)	2.47 (63)	2.36 (60)	1.93 (49)	0.87 (22)	0.52 (13)	0.06 (1.5)	0 (0)	0.01 (0.25)	0.25 (6.4)	0.68 (17)	1.32 (34)	2.03 (52)	12.5 (318.15)

== Demographics ==
Historical population
Census	Pop.	Note	%±
1980	1,706		—
1990	3,392		98.8%
2000	4,807		41.7%
2010	5,197		8.1%
2020	5,164		−0.6%
U.S. Decennial Census 1980; 1990 2000 2010

Hilmar-Irwin first appeared as a census designated place in the 1980 United States census.

=== 2020 census ===
As of the 2020 census, Hilmar-Irwin had a population of 5,164. The population density was 1,315.0 inhabitants per square mile (507.7/km^{2}). The median age was 39.4 years. 23.5% of residents were under the age of 18 and 17.5% of residents were 65 years of age or older. For every 100 females there were 93.3 males, and for every 100 females age 18 and over there were 92.2 males age 18 and over.

0.0% of residents lived in urban areas, while 100.0% lived in rural areas.

The whole population lived in households. There were 1,846 households in Hilmar-Irwin, of which 31.4% had children under the age of 18 living in them. Of all households, 55.7% were married-couple households, 5.9% were cohabiting-couple households, 14.1% were households with a male householder and no spouse or partner present, and 24.3% were households with a female householder and no spouse or partner present. About 22.4% of all households were made up of individuals and 12.2% had someone living alone who was 65 years of age or older. The average household size was 2.8. There were 1,334 families (72.3% of all households).

There were 1,905 housing units, of which 3.1% were vacant. Of occupied units, 69.5% were owner-occupied and 30.5% were occupied by renters. The homeowner vacancy rate was 0.5% and the rental vacancy rate was 1.4%.

Racial composition as of the 2020 census
Race	Number	Percent
White	3,995	77.4%
Black or African American	10	0.2%
American Indian and Alaska Native	52	1.0%
Asian	70	1.4%
Native Hawaiian and Other Pacific Islander	3	0.1%
Some other race	415	8.0%
Two or more races	619	12.0%
Hispanic or Latino (of any race)	1,099	21.3%

=== Income and poverty ===
In 2023, the US Census Bureau estimated that the median household income was $76,492, and the per capita income was $36,796. About 16.6% of families and 19.8% of the population were below the poverty line.

=== 2010 census ===
At the 2010 census Hilmar-Irwin had a population of 5,197. The population density was 1,323.1 inhabitants per square mile (510.9/km^{2}). The racial makeup of Hilmar-Irwin was 4,475 (86.1%) White, 15 (0.3%) African American, 23 (0.4%) Native American, 87 (1.7%) Asian, 1 (0.0%) Pacific Islander, 439 (8.4%) from other races, and 157 (3.0%) from two or more races. Hispanic or Latino of any race were 916 people (17.6%).

The whole population lived in households, no one lived in non-institutionalized group quarters and no one was institutionalized.

There were 1,755 households, 694 (39.5%) had children under the age of 18 living in them, 1,082 (61.7%) were opposite-sex married couples living together, 205 (11.7%) had a female householder with no husband present, 106 (6.0%) had a male householder with no wife present. There were 82 (4.7%) unmarried opposite-sex partnerships, and 15 (0.9%) same-sex married couples or partnerships. 301 households (17.2%) were one person and 158 (9.0%) had someone living alone who was 65 or older. The average household size was 2.96. There were 1,393 families (79.4% of households); the average family size was 3.32.

The age distribution was 1,390 people (26.7%) under the age of 18, 483 people (9.3%) aged 18 to 24, 1,289 people (24.8%) aged 25 to 44, 1,323 people (25.5%) aged 45 to 64, and 712 people (13.7%) who were 65 or older. The median age was 36.2 years. For every 100 females, there were 96.9 males. For every 100 females age 18 and over, there were 91.8 males.

There were 1,841 housing units at an average density of 468.7 per square mile, of the occupied units 1,288 (73.4%) were owner-occupied and 467 (26.6%) were rented. The homeowner vacancy rate was 0.9%; the rental vacancy rate was 6.8%. 3,672 people (70.7% of the population) lived in owner-occupied housing units and 1,525 people (29.3%) lived in rental housing units.

== Politics ==
In the California State Legislature, Hilmar-Irwin is located in the 4th senatorial district, represented by Republican Marie Alvarado-Gil, and in the 22nd Assembly district, represented by Republican Juan Alanis.

In the United States House of Representatives, Burbank is in California's 13th congressional district, represented by Democrat Adam Gray.

== See also ==
- Hilmar, California
- Irwin, California
