= Dos Palos Y, California =

Dos Palos Y
- Census-designated place
- Location in Merced County, California

- Location in California
- Coordinates: 37°02′56″N 120°38′08″W
- Country: United States
- State: California
- County: Merced

Area
  - Total: 1.56 sq mi (4.05 km^{2})
  - Land: 1.56 sq mi (4.05 km^{2})
  - Water: 0 sq mi (0.00 km^{2}) 0%
- Elevation: 112 ft (34 m)

Population (2020)
  - Total: 310
  - Density: 198.0/sq mi (76.46/km^{2})
- Time zone: UTC-8 (Pacific (PST))
  - Summer (DST): UTC-7 (PDT)
- ZIP Code: 93620 (Dos Palos)
- Area code: 209
- GNIS feature IDs: 1655978; 2582998

Dos Palos Y (Dos Palos, Spanish for "Two Timbers") is a census-designated place at the "Y" intersection of State Route 152 and SR 33 in Merced County, California, United States. It is located 11.5 miles (19 km) east of Los Banos and 4.8 miles (7.7 km) north of Dos Palos proper. As of the 2020 census, the population was 310.

In 1966, the local post office was moved to Dos Palos Y from Santa Rita Park, 2.3 miles (3.7 km) to the east.

== Geography ==
According to the United States Census Bureau, the CDP covers an area of 1.6 square miles (4.1 km^{2}), all land. The area has an elevation of 112 feet (34 m).

Land use in this part of the San Joaquin Valley is dominated by farms and orchards. In spring and fall, migratory birds visit Department of Fish and Wildlife sanctuary wetlands in the region.

== Demographics ==
Historical population
Census	Pop.	Note	%±
2010	323		—
2020	310		−4.0%
U.S. Decennial Census; 1850–1870 1880-1890; 1900 1910 1920; 1930 1940 1950; 1960 1970 1980; 1990 2000 2010

Dos Palos Y first appeared as a census designated place in the 2010 U.S. census.

The 2020 United States census reported that Dos Palos Y had a population of 310. The population density was 198.1 inhabitants per square mile (76.5/km^{2}). The racial makeup of Dos Palos Y was 104 (33.5%) White, 0 (0.0%) African American, 2 (0.6%) Native American, 4 (1.3%) Asian, 1 (0.3%) Pacific Islander, 164 (52.9%) from other races, and 35 (11.3%) from two or more races. Hispanic or Latino of any race were 219 persons (70.6%).

The whole population lived in households. There were 115 households, out of which 47 (40.9%) had children under the age of 18 living in them, 56 (48.7%) were married-couple households, 5 (4.3%) were cohabiting couple households, 30 (26.1%) had a female householder with no partner present, and 24 (20.9%) had a male householder with no partner present. 28 households (24.3%) were one person, and 6 (5.2%) were one person aged 65 or older. The average household size was 2.7. There were 79 families (68.7% of all households).

The age distribution was 84 people (27.1%) under the age of 18, 22 people (7.1%) aged 18 to 24, 85 people (27.4%) aged 25 to 44, 80 people (25.8%) aged 45 to 64, and 39 people (12.6%) who were 65 years of age or older. The median age was 35.0 years. For every 100 females, there were 116.8 males.

There were 122 housing units at an average density of 78.0 units per square mile (30.1 units/km^{2}), of which 115 (94.3%) were occupied. Of these, 57 (49.6%) were owner-occupied, and 58 (50.4%) were occupied by renters.
