= Delhi High School =

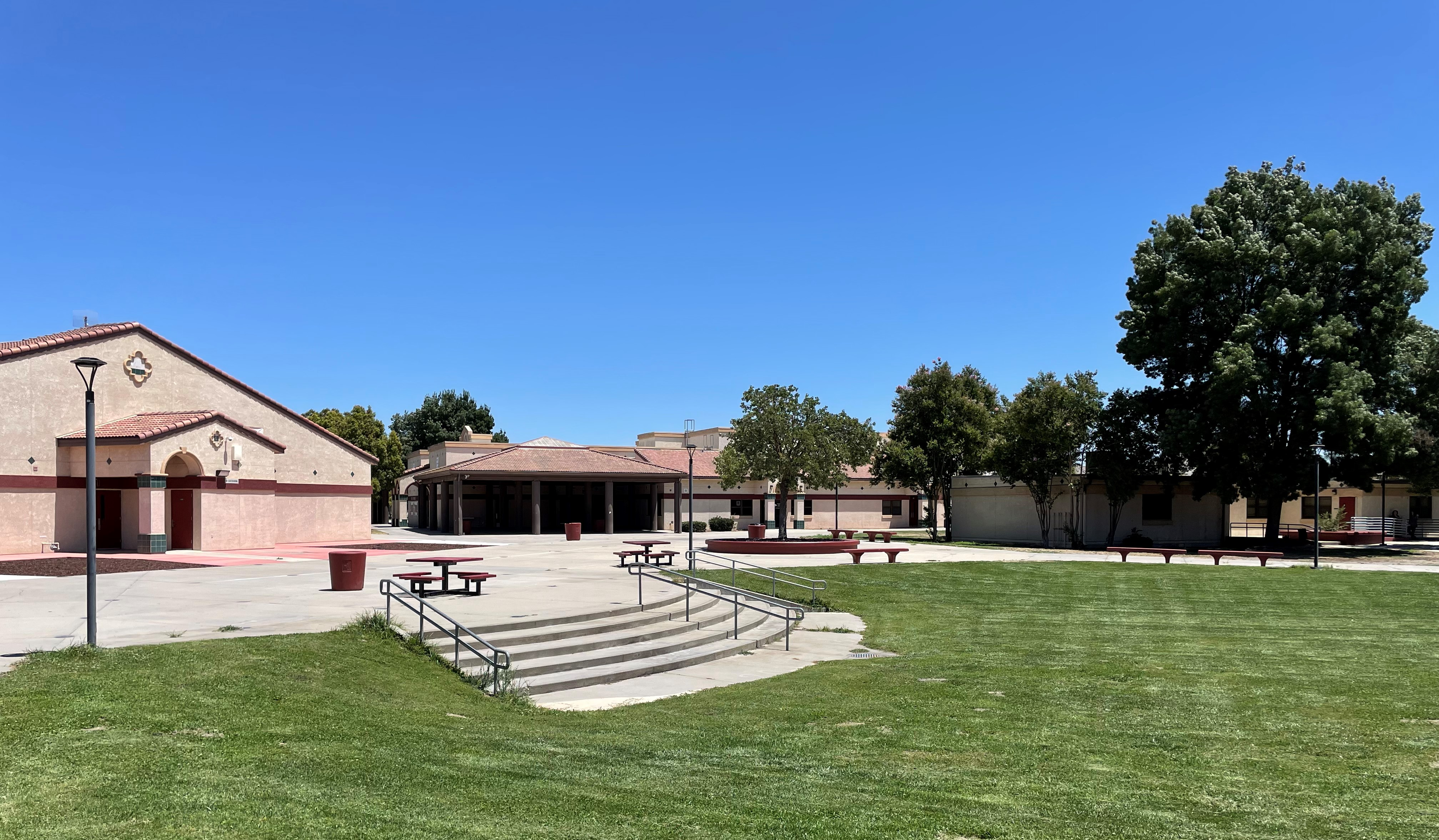
- The school in 2021

Location
- 16881 Schendel Ave; Delhi, California 95315; Delhi, Merced
- Coordinates: 37.4257°N 120.7905°W

Information
- Type: Public Coed
- Established: 1998
- School district: Delhi Unified School District
- Principal: Ed Taylor
- Teaching staff: 36.43 (FTE)
- Enrollment: 710 (2025–2026)
- Student to teacher ratio: 19.85
- Color
- Slogan: Right Here Right Now!
- Athletics conference: Southern Athletic League (SAL)
- Mascot: Hawk
- Team name: Delhi Hawks
- Website: https://www.delhi.k12.ca.us/

Delhi High School is a public high school in Delhi, Merced County, California. It was established in 1998. It is part of Delhi Unified School District, which is a K–12 rural school district along with these schools: Schendel Elementary, Harmony Elementary, El Capitain Elementary and Delhi Middle School. It has been active with the program Future Farmers of America (FFA) since 2016, and has been invited to multiple National Events.

== Statistics ==
=== Demographics ===
Enrollment by ethnicity for 2021–22
White	African American	Asian	Latino	Other.
29	1	19	716	15

=== SAT performance ===
SAT Scores for 2015–16
	Math average	Writing average	Reading average
Delhi High	423	419	434
Statewide	494	477	484

== Student activities ==
=== Athletics ===
Athletics include: baseball, boys and girls soccer, boys and girls basketball, cheerleading, boys and girls cross country, football, softball, boys and girls tennis, boys and girls track, boys and girls volleyball, and boys and girls wrestling.
