= Santa Rita Park, California =

Unincorporated community in California, United States

Santa Rita Park
- Unincorporated community
- Location in California Santa Rita Park (the United States)
- Coordinates: 37°02′51″N 120°35′43″W
- Country: United States
- State: California
- County: Merced
- Elevation: 118 ft (36 m)

Santa Rita Park (Santa Rita, Spanish for "Saint Rita") is an unincorporated community in Merced County, California, United States. It is located 2.25 miles (4 km) east of Dos Palos Y, at an elevation of 118 feet (36 m).

The Santa Rita Park post office opened in 1940. In 1966 it moved west to Dos Palos Y.
