= Delhi Unified School District =

School district in California, United States

Address
- 9716 Hinton Avenue Delhi, California, 95315; United States

District information
- Type: Public
- Grades: K–12
- NCES District ID: 0600039

Students and staff
- Students: 2,504 (2020–2021)
- Teachers: 105.29 (FTE)
- Staff: 143.0 (FTE)
- Student–teacher ratio: 23.78:1
- District mascot: Hawks
- Colors: Cardinal and Black

Other information
- Website: www.delhi.k12.ca.us

Delhi Unified School District is a public school district based in Merced County, California.

== Schools ==
The District includes:

- El Capitan Elementary
- Harmony Elementary
- Schendel Elementary
- Delhi Middle School
- Delhi High School
