= Tuttle, California =

- Census-designated place
- Location within California Location within the United States
- Coordinates: 37°17′46″N 120°22′44″W
- Country: United States
- State: California
- County: Merced

Area
  - Total: 1.759 sq mi (4.555 km^{2})
  - Land: 1.759 sq mi (4.555 km^{2})
  - Water: 0 sq mi (0 km^{2}) 0%
- Elevation: 207 ft (63 m)

Population (2020)
  - Total: 102
  - Density: 58.0/sq mi (22.4/km^{2})
- Time zone: UTC-8 (Pacific (PST))
  - Summer (DST): UTC-7 (PDT)
- ZIP Code: 95340 (Merced)
- Area code: 209
- GNIS feature IDs: 1660046; 2583170

Tuttle (formerly Turner) is an unincorporated community and census-designated place (CDP) in Merced County, California, United States. It is located on the Atchison, Topeka and Santa Fe Railroad 6 miles (10 km) east of Merced, the county seat, at an elevation of 207 feet (63 m). The population was 102 at the 2020 census.

The town was named for R.H. Tuttle, an official of the railroad.

== Geography ==
Tuttle is in eastern Merced County along California State Route 140, which leads west into Merced and northeast 31 miles (50 km) to Mariposa in the foothills of the Sierra Nevada. According to the United States Census Bureau, the Tuttle CDP covers an area of 1.8 square miles (4.7 km^{2}), all land.

== Demographics ==
Historical population
Census	Pop.	Note	%±
2010	103		—
2020	102		−1.0%
U.S. Decennial Census; 1850–1870 1880-1890; 1900 1910 1920; 1930 1940 1950; 1960 1970 1980; 1990 2000 2010

Tuttle first appeared as a census designated place in the 2010 U.S. census.

The 2020 United States census reported that Tuttle had a population of 102. The population density was 58.0 inhabitants per square mile (22.4/km^{2}). The racial makeup of Tuttle was 32 (31.4%) White, 4 (3.9%) African American, 3 (2.9%) Native American, 7 (6.9%) Asian, 0 (0.0%) Pacific Islander, 20 (19.6%) from other races, and 36 (35.3%) from two or more races. Hispanic or Latino of any race were 54 persons (52.9%).

The whole population lived in households. There were 30 households, out of which 8 (26.7%) had children under the age of 18 living in them, 18 (60.0%) were married-couple households, 3 (10.0%) were cohabiting couple households, 6 (20.0%) had a female householder with no partner present, and 3 (10.0%) had a male householder with no partner present. 3 households (10.0%) were one person, and 1 (3.3%) were one person aged 65 or older. The average household size was 3.4. There were 25 families (83.3% of all households).

The age distribution was 24 people (23.5%) under the age of 18, 14 people (13.7%) aged 18 to 24, 19 people (18.6%) aged 25 to 44, 31 people (30.4%) aged 45 to 64, and 14 people (13.7%) who were 65 years of age or older. The median age was 42.0 years. There were 57 males and 45 females.

There were 36 housing units at an average density of 20.5 units per square mile (7.9 units/km^{2}), of which 30 (83.3%) were occupied. Of these, 10 (33.3%) were owner-occupied, and 20 (66.7%) were occupied by renters.
