= South Dos Palos, California =

Census-designated place in California, US

- Census-designated place
- Location in Merced County and the state of California

- Location in the United States
- Coordinates: 36°57′52″N 120°39′12″W
- Country: United States
- State: California
- County: Merced

Area
  - Total: 1.538 sq mi (3.984 km^{2})
  - Land: 1.538 sq mi (3.984 km^{2})
  - Water: 0 sq mi (0 km^{2}) 0%
- Elevation: 118 ft (36 m)

Population (2020)
  - Total: 1,747
  - Density: 1,136/sq mi (438.5/km^{2})
- Time zone: UTC-8 (Pacific (PST))
  - Summer (DST): UTC-7 (PDT)
- ZIP code: 93665
- Area code: 209
- FIPS code: 06-72954
- GNIS feature ID: 0234957

South Dos Palos (formerly Dos Palos Station) is an unincorporated community and census-designated place (CDP) in Merced County, California, United States. It is located 2 miles (3 km) southwest of Dos Palos at an elevation of 118 feet (36 m). The population was 1,747 at the 2020 census, up from 1,620 at the 2010 census.

== Geography ==
South Dos Palos is located near the southeastern border of Merced County at 36°57′52″N 120°39′12″W. It is bordered to the north by the city of Dos Palos. California State Route 33 forms the eastern edge of the community, leading north and west 17 miles (27 km) to Los Banos and southeast 13 miles (21 km) to Firebaugh. Merced, the county seat, is 29 miles (47 km) to the northeast via State Routes 33, 152, and 59.

According to the United States Census Bureau, the South Dos Palos CDP has a total area of 1.5 square miles (3.9 km^{2}), all land.

== History ==
The South Dos Palos post office opened in 1906. It is home to Koda Farms, a Japanese rice company known for its historically innovative practices.

== Demographics ==
Historical population
Census	Pop.	Note	%±
1990	1,214		—
2000	1,385		14.1%
2010	1,620		17.0%
2020	1,747		7.8%
U.S. Decennial Census; 1990 2000 2010

=== 2020 census ===
As of the 2020 census, South Dos Palos had a population of 1,747. The population density was 1,135.9 inhabitants per square mile (438.6/km^{2}). The median age was 29.2 years. 35.5% of residents were under the age of 18 and 9.6% of residents were 65 years of age or older. For every 100 females there were 108.2 males, and for every 100 females age 18 and over there were 107.7 males age 18 and over.

86.1% of residents lived in urban areas, while 13.9% lived in rural areas.

Racial composition as of the 2020 census
Race	Number	Percent
White	716	41.0%
Black or African American	109	6.2%
American Indian and Alaska Native	51	2.9%
Asian	14	0.8%
Native Hawaiian and Other Pacific Islander	0	0.0%
Some other race	593	33.9%
Two or more races	264	15.1%
Hispanic or Latino (of any race)	1,470	84.1%

The Census reported that the whole population lived in households. There were 438 households, out of which 244 (55.7%) had children under the age of 18 living in them, 224 (51.1%) were married-couple households, 34 (7.8%) were cohabiting couple households, 103 (23.5%) had a female householder with no partner present, and 77 (17.6%) had a male householder with no partner present. 47 households (10.7%) were one person, and 24 (5.5%) were one person aged 65 or older. The average household size was 3.99. There were 369 families (84.2% of all households).

There were 465 housing units, of which 438 (94.2%) were occupied. Of these, 250 (57.1%) were owner-occupied, and 188 (42.9%) were occupied by renters. The homeowner vacancy rate was 1.6% and the rental vacancy rate was 5.1%.

=== Income and poverty ===
In 2023, the US Census Bureau estimated that the median household income was $55,288, and the per capita income was $23,153. About 36.6% of families and 35.2% of the population were below the poverty line.

=== 2010 census ===
The 2010 United States census reported that South Dos Palos had a population of 1,620. The population density was 1,055.6 inhabitants per square mile (407.6/km^{2}). The racial makeup of South Dos Palos was 809 (49.9%) White, 135 (8.3%) African American, 21 (1.3%) Native American, 36 (2.2%) Asian, 10 (0.6%) Pacific Islander, 552 (34.1%) from other races, and 57 (3.5%) from two or more races. Hispanic or Latino of any race were 1,262 persons (77.9%).

The Census reported that 1,620 people (100% of the population) lived in households, 0 (0%) lived in non-institutionalized group quarters, and 0 (0%) were institutionalized.

There were 426 households, out of which 257 (60.3%) had children under the age of 18 living in them, 228 (53.5%) were opposite-sex married couples living together, 106 (24.9%) had a female householder with no husband present, 36 (8.5%) had a male householder with no wife present. There were 36 (8.5%) unmarried opposite-sex partnerships, and 2 (0.5%) same-sex married couples or partnerships. 47 households (11.0%) were made up of individuals, and 14 (3.3%) had someone living alone who was 65 years of age or older. The average household size was 3.80. There were 370 families (86.9% of all households); the average family size was 4.02.

The population was spread out, with 601 people (37.1%) under the age of 18, 197 people (12.2%) aged 18 to 24, 403 people (24.9%) aged 25 to 44, 315 people (19.4%) aged 45 to 64, and 104 people (6.4%) who were 65 years of age or older. The median age was 25.8 years. For every 100 females, there were 100.5 males. For every 100 females age 18 and over, there were 99.4 males.

There were 488 housing units at an average density of 318.0 per square mile (122.8/km^{2}), of which 242 (56.8%) were owner-occupied, and 184 (43.2%) were occupied by renters. The homeowner vacancy rate was 3.5%; the rental vacancy rate was 10.7%. 966 people (59.6% of the population) lived in owner-occupied housing units and 654 people (40.4%) lived in rental housing units.

== Politics ==
In the state legislature, South Dos Palos is in the 14th senatorial district, represented by Democrat Anna Caballero, and in the 27th Assembly district, represented by Democrat Esmeralda Soria.

In the United States House of Representatives, South Dos Palos is in California's 13th congressional district, represented by Democrat Adam Gray.
