= Hilmar, California =

Unincorporated community in Merced County, California, United States

Hilmar, California Hilmar-Irwin
- Unincorporated community
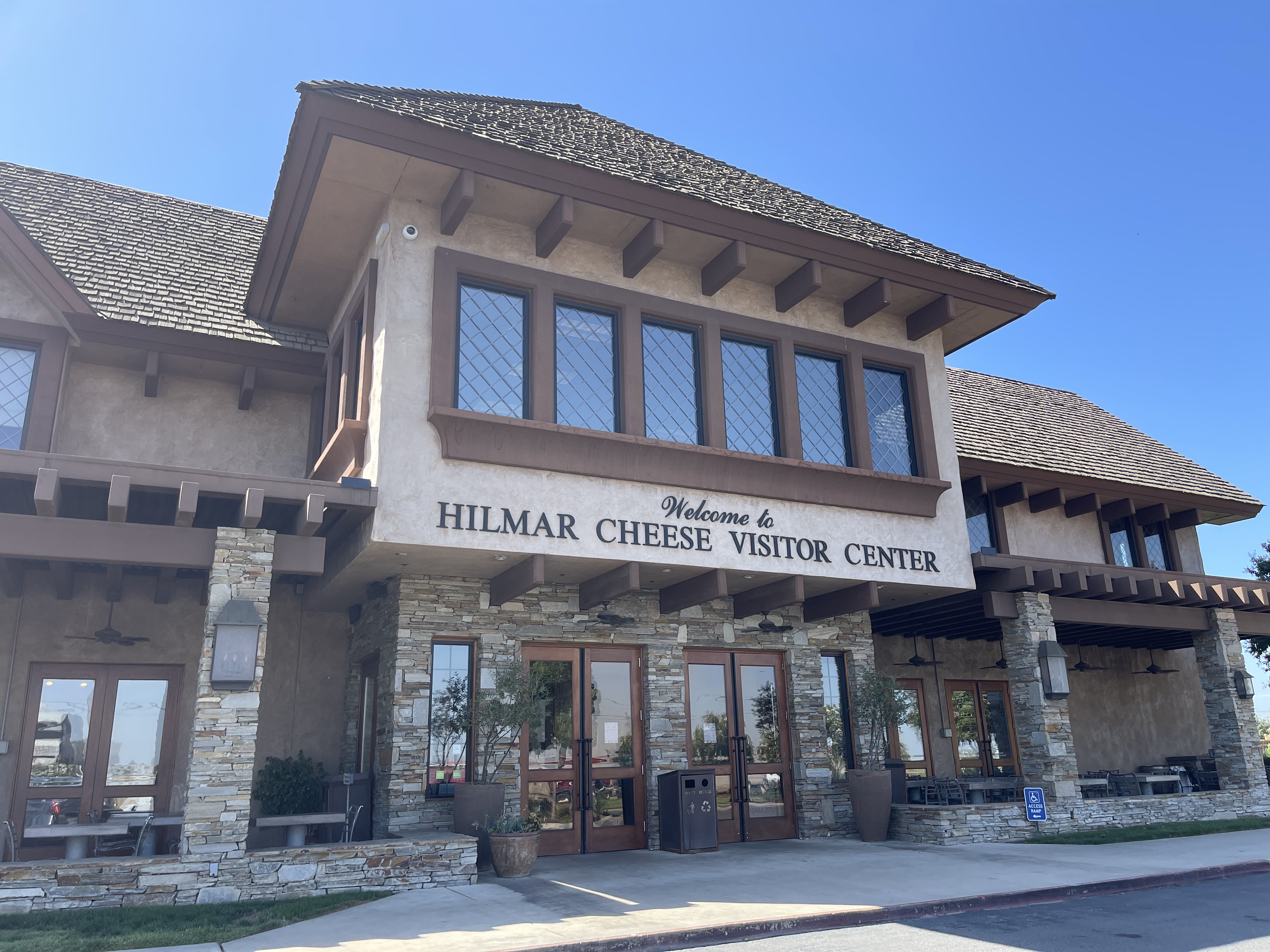
- Hilmar Cheese Company's Visitor Center in Hilmar, California.

- Location in California Hilmar, California (the United States)
- Coordinates: 37°24′31″N 120°51′01″W
- Country: United States
- State: California
- County: Merced County

Area
  - Total: 3.900 sq mi (10.101 km^{2})
- Elevation: 91.9 ft (28.0 m)

Population (2020)
  - Total: 5,164
- ZIP code: 95324
- Area code: 209

Hilmar is an unincorporated community in Merced County, California, United States. It is located 4.25 miles (6.8 km) west-southwest of Delhi, spanning 3.9 sq mi (10 km^{2}) and at an elevation of 92 ft (28 m) above sea level. For census purposes, Hilmar is aggregated with a nearby community into the Hilmar-Irwin census-designated place, which had 5,164 residents as of the 2020 census.

Hilmar began as a colony of Swedish immigrants as early as 1906. The first post office opened in 1920. It is the home of the Hilmar Cheese Company which was founded in 1984 and began production in 1985. Hilmar has five schools within its district: Elim Elementary, Merquin Elementary, Hilmar Middle School, Hilmar High School, and Irwin Continuation School.

Residents refer to the agricultural area as "Country Living at Its Best", and for people living outside the community, it is referred to as "100 Miles to Anywhere".

Hilmar has the 10th largest community of Portuguese-American people, by percentage of population. In support of the local Portuguese population, there is a Portuguese bakery and fish market, and the high school has a Portuguese club, S.E.C.A., and teaches the Portuguese Language

Hilmar was the southernmost station of the Tidewater Southern Railway. The line terminating in the town was considered the main line of the railroad and was projected to continue south toward Fresno or Bakersfield until the mid-1930s. The line into Hilmar was abandoned in the late 1950s.

In the United States House of Representatives, Hilmar is in California's 13th congressional district, represented by Democrat Adam Gray and Antonio Azevedo as of January 2025.
