= Franklin, Merced County, California =

Franklin, California
- Census-designated place
- Position in California
- Coordinates: 37°19′40″N 120°31′56″W
- Country: United States
- State: California
- County: Merced

Area
  - Total: 2.010 sq mi (5.205 km^{2})
  - Land: 2.010 sq mi (5.205 km^{2})
  - Water: 0 sq mi (0 km^{2}) 0%
- Elevation: 161 ft (49 m)

Population (2020)
  - Total: 6,919
  - Density: 3,443/sq mi (1,329/km^{2})
- Time zone: UTC-8 (Pacific (PST))
  - Summer (DST): UTC-7 (PDT)
- ZIP Code: 95348 (Merced)
- GNIS feature ID: 2583016

Franklin (also referred to as Franklin-Beachwood) is a census-designated place in Merced County, California, United States, sitting at an elevation of 161 feet (49 m). As of the 2020 census the population was 6,919, up from 6,149 in 2010.

Franklin-Beachwood is administered by Merced County as one of its unincorporated urban communities.

== Geography ==
Franklin is in east-central Merced County, bordered to the east by the city of Merced, the county seat. California State Route 99 forms the southern border of the community.

According to the United States Census Bureau, the Franklin CDP covers an area of 2.0 square miles (5.2 km^{2}), all land.

== Demographics ==
Historical population
Census	Pop.	Note	%±
2010	6,149		—
2020	6,919		12.5%
U.S. Decennial Census; 1850–1870 1880-1890; 1900 1910 1920; 1930 1940 1950; 1960 1970 1980; 1990 2000 2010

Franklin first appeared as a census designated place in the 2010 U.S. census.

The 2020 United States census reported that Franklin had a population of 6,919. The population density was 3,416.8 inhabitants per square mile (1,319.2/km^{2}). The racial makeup of Franklin was 30.7% White, 2.9% African American, 2.4% Native American, 16.6% Asian, 0.1% Pacific Islander, 29.6% from other races, and 17.7% from two or more races. Hispanic or Latino of any race were 60.0% of the population.

The whole population lived in households. There were 1,875 households, out of which 48.9% included children under the age of 18, 51.0% were married-couple households, 8.8% were cohabiting couple households, 24.6% had a female householder with no partner present, and 15.6% had a male householder with no partner present. 15.6% of households were one person, and 7.0% were one person aged 65 or older. The average household size was 3.69. There were 1,500 families (80.0% of all households).

The age distribution was 31.9% under the age of 18, 10.9% aged 18 to 24, 26.1% aged 25 to 44, 22.1% aged 45 to 64, and 9.1% who were 65 years of age or older. The median age was 30.1 years. For every 100 females, there were 98.8 males.

There were 1,980 housing units at an average density of 977.8 units per square mile (377.5 units/km^{2}), of which 1,875 (94.7%) were occupied. Of these, 64.4% were owner-occupied, and 35.6% were occupied by renters.

In 2023, the US Census Bureau estimated that 19.2% of the population were foreign-born. Of all people aged 5 or older, 51.2% spoke only English at home, 40.9% spoke Spanish, 7.7% spoke other Indo-European languages, and 0.2% spoke Asian or Pacific Islander languages. Of those aged 25 or older, 76.1% were high school graduates and 23.5% had a bachelor's degree.

The median household income was $61,071, and the per capita income was $29,141. About 22.0% of families and 23.4% of the population were below the poverty line.

In the United States House of Representatives, Franklin is in California's 13th congressional district, represented by Democrat Adam Gray as of January 2025.
