= Le Grand, California =

- Census-designated place
- Location in Merced County and the state of California

- Location in the United States
- Coordinates: 37°13′43″N 120°14′54″W
- Country: United States
- State: California
- County: Merced

Area
  - Total: 1.140 sq mi (2.953 km^{2})
  - Land: 1.140 sq mi (2.953 km^{2})
  - Water: 0 sq mi (0 km^{2}) 0%
- Elevation: 253 ft (77 m)

Population (2020)
  - Total: 1,592
  - Density: 1,396/sq mi (539.1/km^{2})
- Time zone: UTC-8 (Pacific)
  - Summer (DST): UTC-7 (PDT)
- ZIP code: 95333
- Area code: 209
- FIPS code: 06-41040
- GNIS feature IDs: 277537, 2408590

Le Grand (also Legrand) is an unincorporated community and census-designated place (CDP) in Merced County, California, United States. Le Grand is 14 miles (23 km) east-southeast of Merced, the county seat at an elevation of 253 feet (77 m). The population was 1,592 at the 2020 census, down from 1,659 at the 2010 census.

== History ==
The first post office opened in 1896. The name honors William Le Grand Dickinson, who sold the railroad (the San Francisco and San Joaquin Valley Railroad, later the Atchison, Topeka and Santa Fe Railway Valley Division) land for the town.

== Geography ==
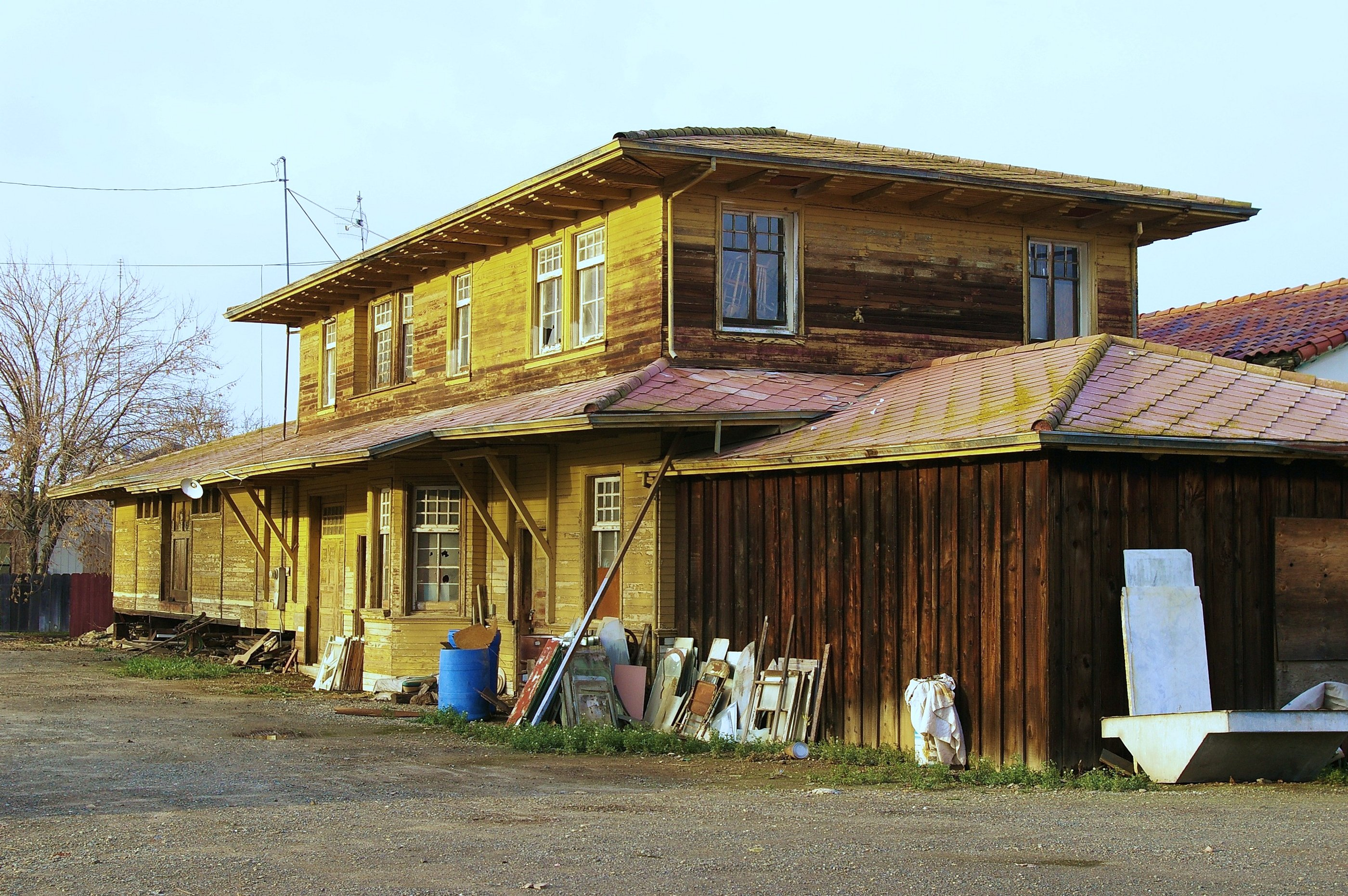
The former Le Grand station in 2008

Le Grand is located in eastern Merced County at 37°13′43″N 120°14′54″W. According to the United States Census Bureau, the CDP has a total area of 1.1 square miles (2.8 km^{2}), all land.

At the 2000 census, according to the United States Census Bureau, the CDP had a total area of 3.6 square miles (9.3 km^{2}), all land.

=== Climate ===
According to the Köppen Climate Classification system, Le Grand has a warm-summer Mediterranean climate, abbreviated "Csa" on climate maps.

Climate data for Le Grand, California (1899–1980)
Month	Jan	Feb	Mar	Apr	May	Jun	Jul	Aug	Sep	Oct	Nov	Dec	Year
Mean daily maximum °F (°C)	55.1 (12.8)	61.0 (16.1)	66.1 (18.9)	73.4 (23.0)	82.2 (27.9)	90.6 (32.6)	97.8 (36.6)	95.5 (35.3)	89.4 (31.9)	79.2 (26.2)	66.0 (18.9)	55.9 (13.3)	76.0 (24.4)
Mean daily minimum °F (°C)	35.8 (2.1)	38.7 (3.7)	40.2 (4.6)	43.4 (6.3)	49.0 (9.4)	55.4 (13.0)	60.5 (15.8)	58.4 (14.7)	54.2 (12.3)	47.3 (8.5)	39.2 (4.0)	35.5 (1.9)	46.5 (8.1)
Average precipitation inches (mm)	2.35 (60)	2.15 (55)	1.99 (51)	1.04 (26)	0.39 (9.9)	0.08 (2.0)	0.01 (0.25)	0.02 (0.51)	0.19 (4.8)	0.65 (17)	1.38 (35)	2.14 (54)	12.40 (315)
Average snowfall inches (cm)	0.1 (0.25)	0.0 (0.0)	0.0 (0.0)	0.0 (0.0)	0.0 (0.0)	0.0 (0.0)	0.0 (0.0)	0.0 (0.0)	0.0 (0.0)	0.0 (0.0)	0.0 (0.0)	0.0 (0.0)	0.1 (0.25)
Average precipitation days (≥ 0.01 in)	7	7	6	3	2	1	0	0	1	2	4	6	39
Source: WRCC

== Demographics ==
Historical population
Census	Pop.	Note	%±
1990	1,205		—
2000	1,760		46.1%
2010	1,659		−5.7%
2020	1,592		−4.0%
U.S. Decennial Census; 1990 2000 2010

Le Grand first appeared as a census designated place in the 1990 U.S. census.

=== 2020 census ===
As of the 2020 census, Le Grand had a population of 1,592. The population density was 1,396.5 inhabitants per square mile (539.2/km^{2}). The median age was 35.3 years. The age distribution was 442 people (27.8%) under the age of 18, 176 people (11.1%) aged 18 to 24, 382 people (24.0%) aged 25 to 44, 385 people (24.2%) aged 45 to 64, and 207 people (13.0%) who were 65 years of age or older. For every 100 females, there were 109.7 males, and for every 100 females age 18 and over there were 102.8 males age 18 and over.

The whole population lived in households. There were 472 households, of which 43.9% had children under the age of 18 living in them. Of all households, 49.8% were married-couple households, 7.6% were cohabiting couple households, 15.0% were households with a male householder and no spouse or partner present, and 27.5% were households with a female householder and no spouse or partner present. About 16.3% of all households were made up of individuals and 7.0% had someone living alone who was 65 years of age or older. The average household size was 3.37. There were 369 families (78.2% of all households).

There were 502 housing units, of which 6.0% were vacant. Of the occupied housing units, 64.4% were owner-occupied and 35.6% were occupied by renters. The homeowner vacancy rate was 0.0% and the rental vacancy rate was 9.1%.

0.0% of residents lived in urban areas, while 100.0% lived in rural areas.

Racial composition as of the 2020 census
Race	Number	Percent
White	531	33.4%
Black or African American	11	0.7%
American Indian and Alaska Native	30	1.9%
Asian	9	0.6%
Native Hawaiian and Other Pacific Islander	1	0.1%
Some other race	645	40.5%
Two or more races	365	22.9%
Hispanic or Latino (of any race)	1,330	83.5%

=== Income and poverty ===
In 2023, the US Census Bureau estimated that the median household income was $53,750, and the per capita income was $19,620. About 12.3% of families and 14.6% of the population were below the poverty line.

=== 2010 census ===
At the 2010 census Le Grand had a population of 1,659. The population density was 1,455.0 inhabitants per square mile (561.8/km^{2}). The racial makeup of Le Grand was 869 (52.4%) White, 19 (1.1%) African American, 35 (2.1%) Native American, 17 (1.0%) Asian, 1 (0.1%) Pacific Islander, 659 (39.7%) from other races, and 59 (3.6%) from two or more races. Hispanic or Latino of any race were 1,357 persons (81.8%).

The whole population lived in households, no one lived in non-institutionalized group quarters and no one was institutionalized.

There were 458 households, 246 (53.7%) had children under the age of 18 living in them, 290 (63.3%) were opposite-sex married couples living together, 74 (16.2%) had a female householder with no husband present, 27 (5.9%) had a male householder with no wife present. There were 24 (5.2%) unmarried opposite-sex partnerships, and 0 (0%) same-sex married couples or partnerships. 59 households (12.9%) were one person and 32 (7.0%) had someone living alone who was 65 or older. The average household size was 3.62. There were 391 families (85.4% of households); the average family size was 3.96.

The age distribution was 534 people (32.2%) under the age of 18, 178 people (10.7%) aged 18 to 24, 418 people (25.2%) aged 25 to 44, 367 people (22.1%) aged 45 to 64, and 162 people (9.8%) who were 65 or older. The median age was 31.5 years. For every 100 females, there were 99.4 males. For every 100 females age 18 and over, there were 94.3 males.

There were 503 housing units at an average density of 441.1 per square mile, of the occupied units 315 (68.8%) were owner-occupied and 143 (31.2%) were rented. The homeowner vacancy rate was 1.9%; the rental vacancy rate was 10.0%. 1,145 people (69.0% of the population) lived in owner-occupied housing units and 514 people (31.0%) lived in rental housing units.

== Government ==
In the California State Legislature, Le Grand is in the 14th senatorial district, represented by Democrat Anna Caballero, and in the 27th Assembly district, represented by Democrat Esmeralda Soria.

In the United States House of Representatives, Le Grand is in California's 13th congressional district, represented by Democrat Adam Gray.
