= Dos Palos-Oro Loma Joint Unified School District =

School district in California, United States

Address
- 2041 Almond Street Dos Palos, California, 93620; United States

District information
- Type: Public
- Grades: K–12
- NCES District ID: 0600033

Students and staff
- Students: 2,292 (2020–2021)
- Teachers: 107.51 (FTE)
- Staff: 144.82 (FTE)
- Student–teacher ratio: 21.32:1

Other information
- Website: www.dpol.net

Dos Palos Oro-Loma Joint Unified is a public school district based in Merced County, California, United States.

== Notable alumni ==
- Dave Henderson, baseball player
- Cody Martin, baseball player
