= Bear Creek, Merced County, California =

Bear Creek
- census-designated place
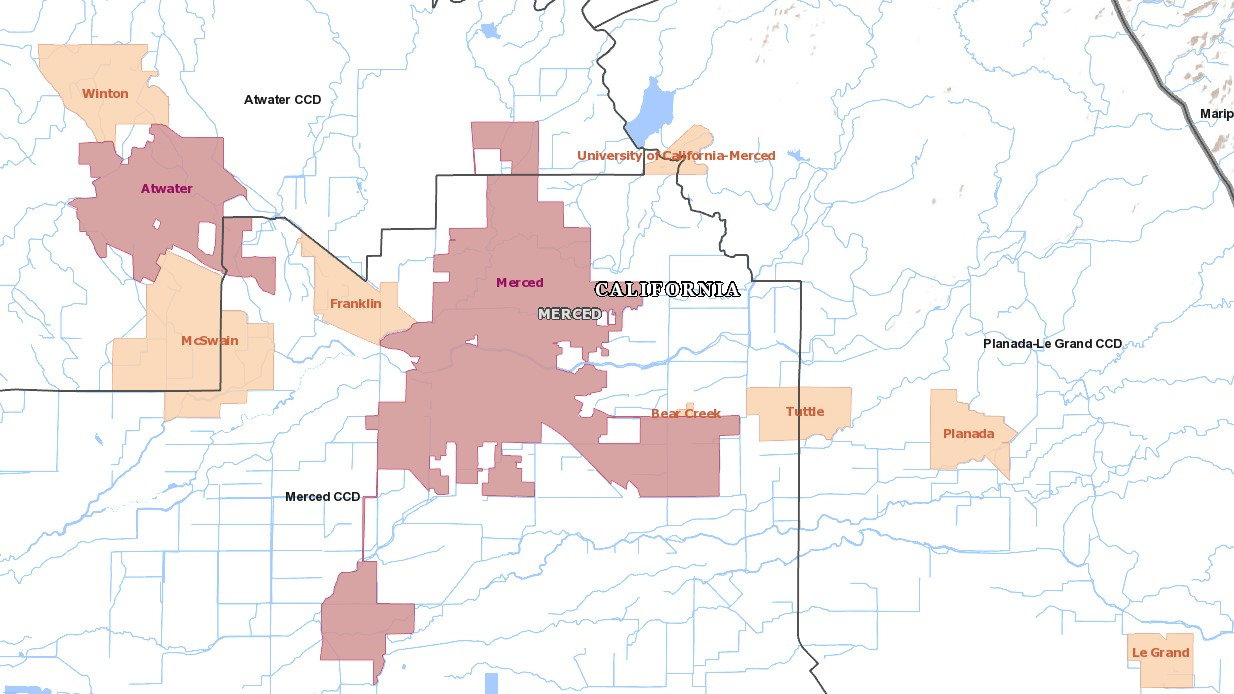

- Location in California
- Coordinates: 37°17′50″N 120°25′03″W
- Country: United States
- State: California
- County: Merced

Area
  - Total: 0.058 sq mi (0.15 km^{2})
  - Land: 0.058 sq mi (0.15 km^{2})
  - Water: 0 sq mi (0.00 km^{2}) 0%
- Elevation: 190 ft (58 m)

Population (2020)
  - Total: 273
  - Density: 4,764.3/sq mi (1,839.49/km^{2})
- Time zone: UTC-8 (Pacific (PST))
  - Summer (DST): UTC-7 (PDT)
- ZIP Code: 95340
- Area code: 209
- FIPS Code: 06-04632
- GNIS feature ID: 1659692; 2629759

Bear Creek is a census-designated place in Merced County, California, United States. It is located 3.5 miles (5.6 km) east of Merced, at an elevation of 190 feet (58 m). The population was 273 at the 2020 United States census, down from 290 at the 2010 census.

== History ==
A post office operated at Bear Creek from 1871 to 1872.

== Geography ==
According to the United States Census Bureau, the CDP covers an area of 0.1 square mile (0.1 km^{2}), all land.

== Demographics ==
Historical population
Census	Pop.	Note	%±
2010	290		—
2020	273		−5.9%
U.S. Decennial Census; 1850–1870 1880-1890; 1900 1910 1920; 1930 1940 1950; 1960 1970 1980; 1990 2000 2010

Bear Creek first appeared as a census designated place in the 2010 U.S. census.

The 2020 United States census reported that Bear Creek had a population of 273. The population density was 4,789.5 inhabitants per square mile (1,849.2/km^{2}). The racial makeup of Bear Creek was 54 (19.8%) White, 7 (2.6%) African American, 7 (2.6%) Native American, 13 (4.8%) Asian, 2 (0.7%) Pacific Islander, 92 (33.7%) from other races, and 98 (35.9%) from two or more races. Hispanic or Latino of any race were 195 people (71.4%).

The whole population lived in households. There were 82 households, out of which 28 (34.1%) had children under the age of 18 living in them, 30 (36.6%) were married-couple households, 6 (7.3%) were cohabiting couple households, 28 (34.1%) had a female householder with no partner present, and 18 (22.0%) had a male householder with no partner present. 26 (31.7%) of households were one person, and 12 (14.6%) were one person aged 65 or older. The average household size was 3.33. There were 50 families (61.0% of all households).

The age distribution was 76 people (27.8%) under the age of 18, 18 people (6.6%) aged 18 to 24, 72 people (26.4%) aged 25 to 44, 60 people (22.0%) aged 45 to 64, and 47 people (17.2%) who were 65 years of age or older. The median age was 33.9 years. For every 100 females, there were 96.4 males.

There were 87 housing units at an average density of 1,526.3 units per square mile (589.3 units/km^{2}), of which 82 (94.3%) were occupied. Of these, 31 (37.8%) were owner-occupied, and 51 (62.2%) were occupied by renters.
