= McSwain, California =

- Census-designated place
- Location within California Location within the United States
- Coordinates: 37°18′52″N 120°35′12″W
- Country: United States
- State: California
- County: Merced

Area
  - Total: 6.027 sq mi (15.609 km^{2})
  - Land: 6.027 sq mi (15.609 km^{2})
  - Water: 0 sq mi (0 km^{2}) 0%
- Elevation: 144 ft (44 m)

Population (2020)
  - Total: 4,480
  - Density: 743/sq mi (287/km^{2})
- Time zone: UTC-8 (Pacific (PST))
  - Summer (DST): UTC-7 (PDT)
- ZIP Code: 95301 (Atwater)
- GNIS feature ID: 2583069

McSwain is an unincorporated community and census-designated place (CDP) in Merced County, California, United States. McSwain sits at an elevation of 144 feet (44 m). As of the 2020 census, the population was 4,480, up from 4,171 in 2010.

== Geography ==
McSwain is in central Merced County and is bordered to the north by the city of Atwater. California State Route 99 forms the northern boundary of the community. Merced, the county seat, is 5 miles (8 km) to the east via State Route 140, which also leads west 25 miles (40 km) to Gustine.

According to the United States Census Bureau, the McSwain CDP covers an area of 6.0 square miles (15.5 km^{2}), all land.

== Demographics ==
Historical population
Census	Pop.	Note	%±
2010	3,704		—
2020	4,480		21.0%
U.S. Decennial Census; 1850–1870 1880-1890; 1900 1910 1920; 1930 1940 1950; 1960 1970 1980; 1990 2000 2010

=== 2020 census ===
As of the 2020 census, McSwain had a population of 4,480. The population density was 743.3 inhabitants per square mile (287.0/km^{2}). The median age was 42.2 years. The age distribution was 24.7% under the age of 18, 7.7% aged 18 to 24, 21.0% aged 25 to 44, 29.2% aged 45 to 64, and 17.5% aged 65 or older. For every 100 females, there were 101.7 males, and for every 100 females age 18 and over, there were 97.3 males age 18 and over.

The census reported that 99.8% of the population lived in households, 9 people (0.2%) lived in non-institutionalized group quarters, and no one was institutionalized. There were 1,465 households, of which 36.0% had children under the age of 18 living in them. Of all households, 67.8% were married-couple households, 3.7% were cohabiting couple households, 15.2% had a female householder with no spouse or partner present, and 13.3% had a male householder with no spouse or partner present. About 14.5% of households were made up of individuals, and 7.5% had someone living alone who was 65 years of age or older. The average household size was 3.05. There were 1,196 families (81.6% of all households).

There were 1,500 housing units at an average density of 248.9 units per square mile (96.1 units/km^{2}), of which 1,465 (97.7%) were occupied and 2.3% were vacant. Of occupied units, 88.2% were owner-occupied and 11.8% were occupied by renters. The homeowner vacancy rate was 0.6%, and the rental vacancy rate was 3.9%. 86.1% of residents lived in urban areas, while 13.9% lived in rural areas.

Racial composition as of the 2020 census
Race	Number	Percent
White	2,797	62.4%
Black or African American	55	1.2%
American Indian and Alaska Native	87	1.9%
Asian	325	7.3%
Native Hawaiian and Other Pacific Islander	3	0.1%
Some other race	542	12.1%
Two or more races	671	15.0%
Hispanic or Latino (of any race)	1,414	31.6%

=== 2010 census ===
McSwain first appeared as a census designated place in the 2010 U.S. census.
