= Winton, California =

- Census-designated place
- Interactive map of Winton, California
- Location in the United States
- Coordinates: 37°23.3′N 120°36.8′W
- Country: United States
- State: California
- County: Merced

Area
  - Total: 3.041 sq mi (7.876 km^{2})
  - Land: 3.041 sq mi (7.876 km^{2})
  - Water: 0 sq mi (0 km^{2}) 0%
- Elevation: 177 ft (54 m)

Population (2020)
  - Total: 11,709
  - Density: 3,850/sq mi (1,487/km^{2})
- Time zone: UTC-8 (Pacific (PST))
  - Summer (DST): UTC-7 (PDT)
- ZIP code: 95388
- Area code: 209
- FIPS code: 06-86076
- GNIS feature ID: 1660195

Winton (formerly Merced Colony No. 1, Merced Colony No. 2, and Windfield) is an unincorporated community and census-designated place (CDP) in Merced County, California, United States. Winton is located 2.5 miles (4 km) north of Atwater, California. and 10 miles (16 km) northwest of Merced, the county seat. Winton was established along the original Santa Fe Railroad. At one time, passenger trains would stop at this location.

As of the 2020 census, the population of Winton was 11,709, up from 10,613 in 2010.

== Geography ==
Winton is located in northern Merced County at 37°23.3′N 120°36.8′W.

According to the United States Census Bureau, the CDP has a total area of 3.0 square miles (7.8 km^{2}), all land.

== History ==
In the 1910, Atwater businessman H. A. Logue tried to establish a small settlement named Yam at the crossroads of the Santa Fe line by building the Yam Hotel and a store built there as the center of the new colony. At about the same time, the Crocker-Huffman interests sold roughly twelve square miles of nearby land to the Co-operative Land and Trust Company of San Francisco, which laid out a planned farming community along the railroad. This development, originally associated with the Winn Ranch and known as Winfield, included a garage and a centralized water system with a well and elevated tank.

When the railroad chose a location for a depot, it placed the station at Winfield rather than at Yam, ending the colony. With the backing of the land company and the railroad, the new community grew as its farmland was divided into small plots and sold to migrants attracted by low land prices.

The townsite was formally surveyed in April 1912 by A. E. Cowell, W. E. Bedesen, and G. E. Winton, and the map was recorded soon afterward. The settlement was first called Winfield, but because the railroad already had another station with that name in Arizona, the name was modified by dropping "-field” and adding “-ton,” producing the present name, Winton.

The community was home to the Winton Wrestling Alliance (WWA), a prominent Backyard Wrestling Federation in the late 1990s to mid 2000s.

== Demographics ==
Historical population
Census	Pop.	Note	%±
1990	7,559		—
2000	8,832		16.8%
2010	10,613		20.2%
2020	11,709		10.3%
2023 (est.)	11,640	▼	−0.6%

=== 2020 census ===
As of the 2020 census, Winton had a population of 11,709. The median age was 28.6 years. 33.1% of residents were under the age of 18 and 9.0% of residents were 65 years of age or older. For every 100 females there were 100.0 males, and for every 100 females age 18 and over there were 99.1 males age 18 and over.

99.2% of residents lived in urban areas, while 0.8% lived in rural areas.

There were 3,115 households in Winton, of which 53.0% had children under the age of 18 living in them. Of all households, 52.8% were married-couple households, 16.2% were households with a male householder and no spouse or partner present, and 22.6% were households with a female householder and no spouse or partner present. About 12.5% of all households were made up of individuals and 4.5% had someone living alone who was 65 years of age or older.

There were 3,203 housing units, of which 2.7% were vacant. The homeowner vacancy rate was 0.7% and the rental vacancy rate was 2.1%.

Racial composition as of the 2020 census
Race	Number	Percent
White	3,544	30.3%
Black or African American	180	1.5%
American Indian and Alaska Native	524	4.5%
Asian	518	4.4%
Native Hawaiian and Other Pacific Islander	13	0.1%
Some other race	4,801	41.0%
Two or more races	2,129	18.2%
Hispanic or Latino (of any race)	9,294	79.4%

=== Demographic estimates ===
The five largest ethnic groups in Winton, CA are Other (Hispanic) (49%), White (Hispanic) (23%), White (Non-Hispanic) (17.7%), Asian (Non-Hispanic) (3.69%), and Two+ (Hispanic) (3.57%). As of 2020, 74.5% of residents are citizens and 37% of Winton, CA residents were born outside of the country (4.3k people).

=== 2010 census ===
The 2010 United States census reported that Winton had a population of 10,613. The population density was 3,490.1 inhabitants per square mile (1,347.5/km^{2}). The racial makeup of Winton was 5,696 (53.7%) White, 175 (1.6%) African American, 140 (1.3%) Native American, 701 (6.6%) Asian, 8 (0.1%) Pacific Islander, 3,455 (32.6%) from other races, and 438 (4.1%) from two or more races. Hispanic or Latino of any race were 7,566 persons (71.3%).

The Census reported that 10,613 people (100% of the population) lived in households, 0 (0%) lived in non-institutionalized group quarters, and 0 (0%) were institutionalized.

There were 2,718 households, out of which 1,645 (60.5%) had children under the age of 18 living in them, 1,563 (57.5%) were opposite-sex married couples living together, 472 (17.4%) had a female householder with no husband present, 266 (9.8%) had a male householder with no wife present. There were 203 (7.5%) unmarried opposite-sex partnerships, and 24 (0.9%) same-sex married couples or partnerships. 316 households (11.6%) were made up of individuals, and 137 (5.0%) had someone living alone who was 65 years of age or older. The average household size was 3.90. There were 2,301 families (84.7% of all households); the average family size was 4.19.

The population was spread out, with 3,934 people (37.1%) under the age of 18, 1,261 people (11.9%) aged 18 to 24, 2,823 people (26.6%) aged 25 to 44, 1,926 people (18.1%) aged 45 to 64, and 669 people (6.3%) who were 65 years of age or older. The median age was 25.6 years. For every 100 females, there were 100.9 males. For every 100 females age 18 and over, there were 99.7 males.

There were 3,056 housing units at an average density of 1,005.0 per square mile (388.0/km^{2}), of which 1,450 (53.3%) were owner-occupied, and 1,268 (46.7%) were occupied by renters. The homeowner vacancy rate was 4.3%; the rental vacancy rate was 10.4%. 5,366 people (50.6% of the population) lived in owner-occupied housing units and 5,247 people (49.4%) lived in rental housing units.

=== 2000 census ===
As of the census of 2000, there were 8,832 people, 2,343 households, and 1,949 families residing in the CDP. The population density was 3,073.8 inhabitants per square mile (1,186.8/km^{2}). There were 2,514 housing units at an average density of 875.0 per square mile (337.8/km^{2}). The racial makeup of the CDP was 44.28% White, 2.33% African American, 1.08% Native American, 5.36% Asian, 0.34% Pacific Islander, 41.00% from other races, and 5.62% from two or more races. Hispanic or Latino of any race were 62.19% of the population.

There were 2,343 households, out of which 54.5% had children under the age of 18 living with them, 60.4% were married couples living together, 15.5% had a female householder with no husband present, and 16.8% were non-families. 12.6% of all households were made up of individuals, and 4.7% had someone living alone who was 65 years of age or older. The average household size was 3.77 and the average family size was 4.11.

In the CDP, the population was spread out, with 39.1% under the age of 18, 12.0% from 18 to 24, 27.6% from 25 to 44, 15.3% from 45 to 64, and 6.0% who were 65 years of age or older. The median age was 24 years. For every 100 females, there were 100.2 males. For every 100 females age 18 and over, there were 100.1 males.

The median income for a household in the CDP was $19,787, and the median income for a family was $19,834. Males had a median income of $16,832 versus $11,676 for females. The per capita income for the CDP was $10,451. About 23.5% of families and 28.8% of the population were below the poverty line, including 38.8% of those under age 18 and 13.5% of those age 65 or over.

== Politics ==
In the state legislature Winton is located in the 14th Senate District, represented by Democrat Anna Caballero, and in the 27th Assembly District, represented by Democrat Esmeralda Soria.

In the United States House of Representatives, Winton is in California's 13th congressional district, represented by Democrat Adam Gray.

== Education ==
Winton is served by the Winton School District. The schools within this district are Frank Sparkes Elementary, Sybil N. Crookham Elementary, Winfield Elementary, and Winton Middle.

== Notable person ==
- Bernard Berrian, NFL receiver for the Chicago Bears and Minnesota Vikings
