= Cody Martin (baseball) =

American baseball player (born 1989)

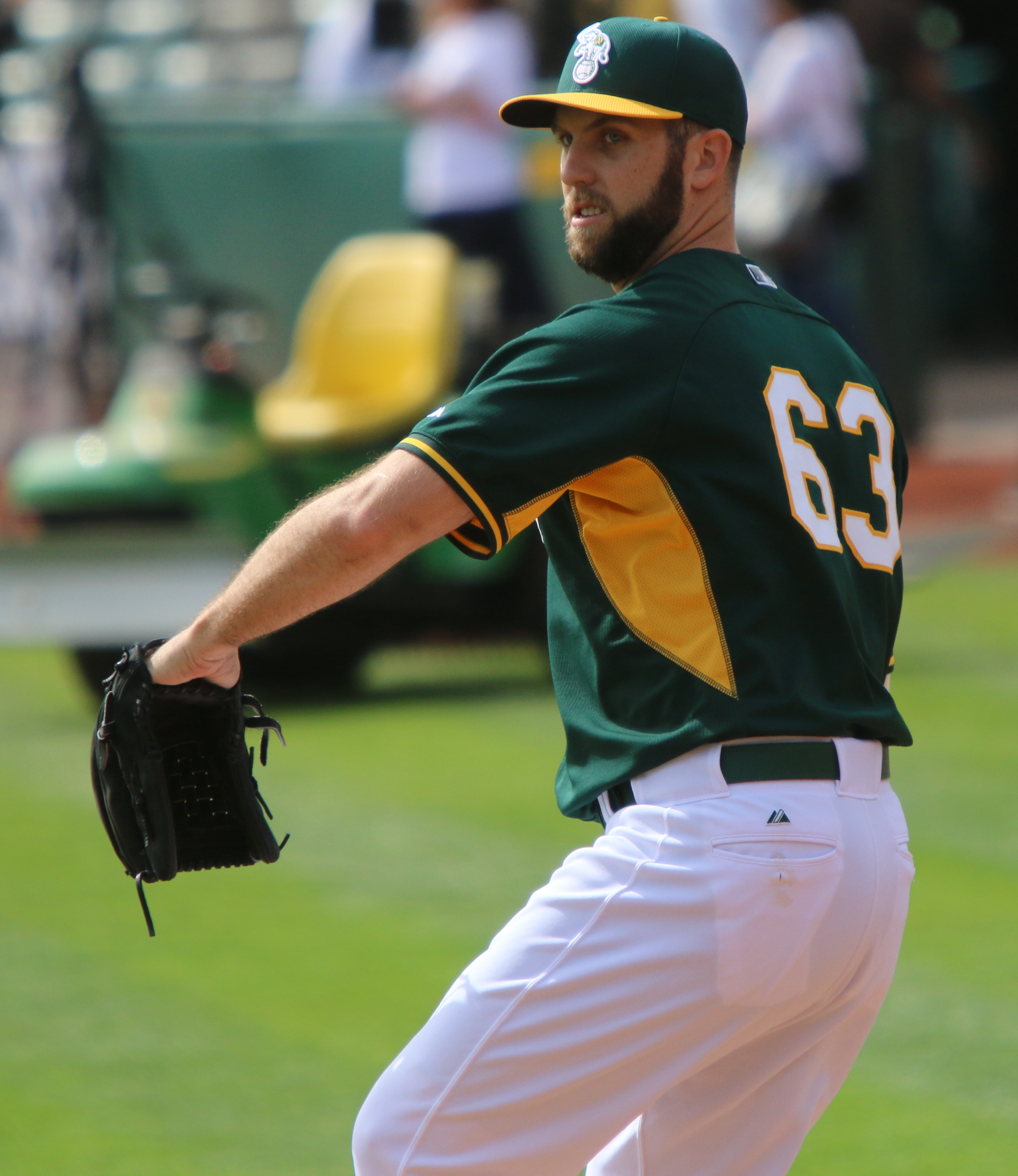
- Martin with the Oakland Athletics in 2015
- Pitcher
- Born: September 4, 1989 (age 36); Dos Palos, California, U.S.
- Batted: Right Threw: Right

MLB debut
- April 7, 2015, for the Atlanta Braves

Last MLB appearance
- October 2, 2017, for the Seattle Mariners

MLB statistics
- Win–loss record: 3–7
- Earned run average: 6.33
- Strikeouts: 42
- Stats at Baseball Reference

Teams
- Atlanta Braves (2015); Oakland Athletics (2015); Seattle Mariners (2016–2017)

Cody Matthew Martin (born September 4, 1989) is an American former professional baseball pitcher. He played in Major League Baseball (MLB) for the Atlanta Braves, Oakland Athletics, and Seattle Mariners. Prior to being drafted by the Braves, Martin played college baseball at Gonzaga University, where he was named a First Team All-American.

== Early life ==
Cody Martin was born on September 4, 1989, to Debbie (Bonds) and Chuck Martin. Chuck was a minor league baseball player in the Atlanta Braves organization from 1984 to 1985.

== Amateur career ==
Martin went to Dos Palos High School in Dos Palos, California. He played for the school's baseball team, and appeared in the Fresno City/County All-Star Game. He also played for the school's football team, but stopped playing football after his junior season to focus on baseball.

Martin attended Gonzaga University, where he played college baseball for the Gonzaga Bulldogs baseball team in the West Coast Conference of the National Collegiate Athletic Association's (NCAA) Division I. He recorded 15 saves as a relief pitcher for Gonzaga in his freshman and sophomore seasons, setting the Gonzaga single-season record with nine in his freshman year. As a junior, Martin served as a starting pitcher, leading Gonzaga with five wins. The Minnesota Twins selected Martin in the 20th round (615th overall) of the 2010 Major League Baseball (MLB) Draft, but he did not sign, returning to Gonzaga for his senior season in 2011. Returning to relief, Martin was named a First Team All-American by Baseball America and Second Team American Baseball Coaches Association All-American after his senior season, in which he led NCAA's Division I in earned run average and batting average against.

== Professional career ==
=== Atlanta Braves ===
The Atlanta Braves selected Martin in the seventh round (236th overall) of the 2011 Major League Baseball draft. He signed with the Braves and made his professional debut that season with the Danville Braves of the Rookie-level Appalachian League. He was promoted to the Rome Braves of the Single-A South Atlantic League later that season. He began the 2012 season with the Lynchburg Hillcats of the High-A Carolina League. Transitioning back into a starting pitcher, Martin was named the Carolina League's player of the week in consecutive weeks, for the weeks ending July 1 and 8.

In 2013, Martin pitched for the Mississippi Braves of the Double-A Southern League and the Gwinnett Braves of the Triple-A International League. He played for Gwinnett in the 2014 season. Martin was invited to spring training in 2015, and made the Braves' Opening Day roster. He was optioned to Gwinnett on May 19, and recalled on June 1. In 21 total appearances for Atlanta, Martin compiled a 2–3 record and 5.40 ERA with 24 strikeouts across 21 2/3 innings pitched.

=== Oakland Athletics ===
On July 2, 2015, the Braves traded Martin to the Oakland Athletics in exchange for international slot number 53, worth $388,400. He was assigned to the Nashville Sounds of the Triple-A Pacific Coast League (PCL). Martin made his Athletics' debut on September 1, and was optioned back to Nashville the next day.

=== Seattle Mariners ===
On October 19, 2015, Martin was claimed off waivers by the Seattle Mariners. He began the 2016 season with the Tacoma Rainiers of the PCL and was promoted to the major leagues on June 2. The Mariners returned Martin to the minors two days later, before recalling him on July 30. He was optioned to the Rainiers on August 7. Martin made his first major league start of the season on August 16, and was sent to the minors on August 23. Martin finished the year at the major league level after he was recalled on September 12, upon the end of the Tacoma Rainiers season. In 9 total appearances for Seattle in 2016, he posted a 1–2 record and 3.86 ERA with 15 strikeouts across 25 2/3 innings pitched.

Martin was designated for assignment on January 11, 2017, and was sent outright to Triple-A Tacoma on January 14. On July 28, the Mariners selected Martin's contract, adding him to their active roster. He made one appearance for Seattle, allowing four runs (three earned) on five hits over two innings pitched. On August 9, Martin was removed from the 40-man roster and sent outright to Tacoma. Martin elected free agency on October 2.

=== New York Mets ===
On March 26, 2018, Martin signed with the Sugar Land Skeeters of the Atlantic League of Professional Baseball. On April 24, he was traded to the Kansas City T-Bones of the American Association.

On May 19, the New York Mets purchased his contract from the T-Bones. In 17 starts for the Triple-A Las Vegas 51s, Martin posted a 3–4 record and 7.03 ERA with 70 strikeouts across 80 2/3 innings of work. He elected free agency following the season on November 2.

== Post-playing career ==
On December 6, 2018, Martin announced his retirement from playing professional baseball, and that he had accepted a position as a northwest area scout for the Atlanta Braves. In the 2024 Major League Baseball draft, the Braves selected Mason Guerra in the fourteenth round based on Martin's recommendation.
