= Dos Palos, California =

City in California, United States

- City
- City of Dos Palos
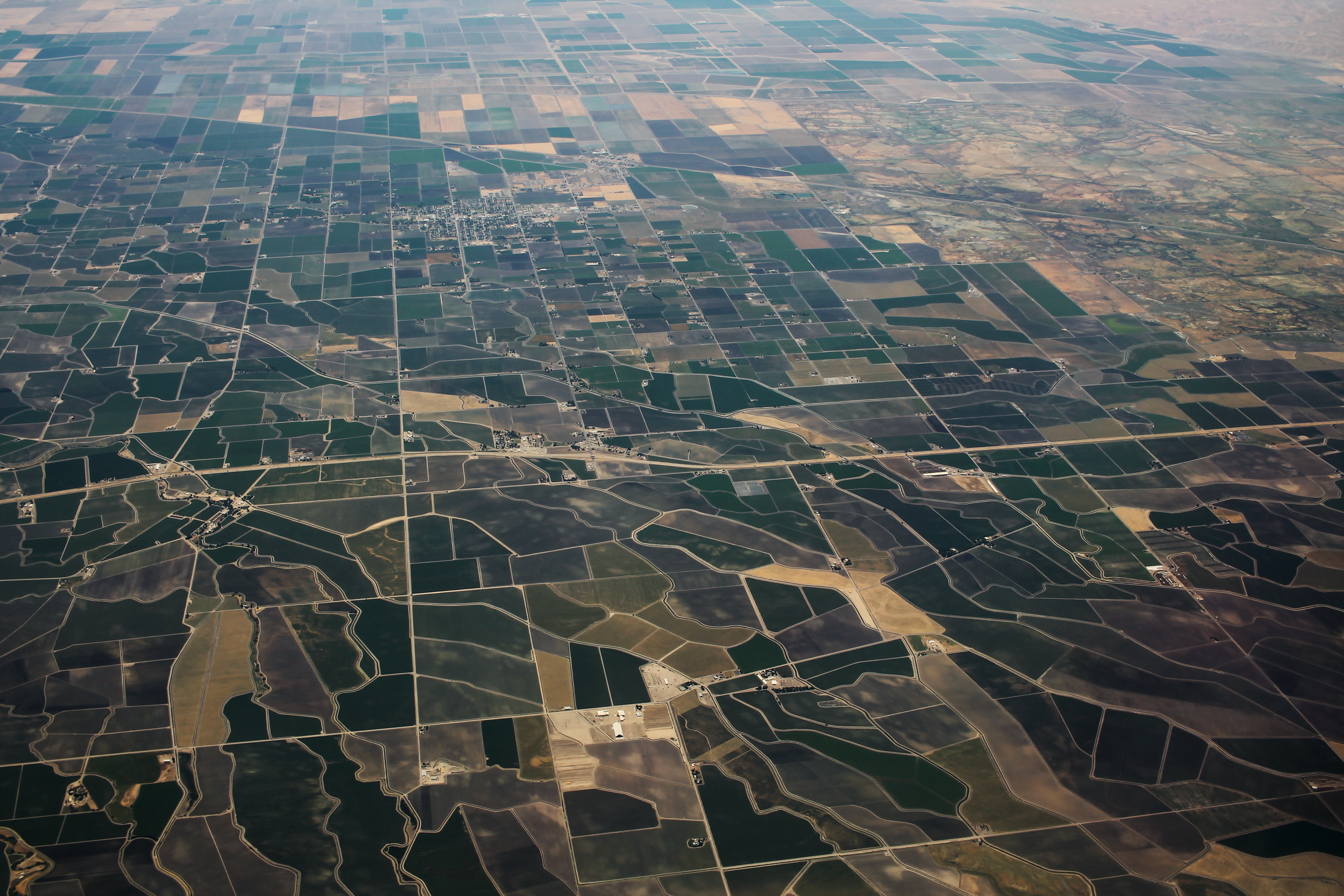
- Aerial view of Dos Palos

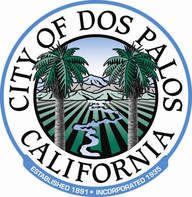
- Seal
- Interactive map of Dos Palos, California
- Location within California Location within the United States
- Coordinates: 36°59′N 120°38′W
- Country: United States
- State: California
- County: Merced
- Incorporated: May 24, 1935

Government
  - City Manager: Darrell Fonseca

Area
  - Total: 1.35 sq mi (3.5 km^{2})
  - Land: 1.35 sq mi (3.5 km^{2})
  - Water: 0.00 sq mi (0 km^{2}) 0%
- Elevation: 118 ft (36 m)

Population (2020)
  - Total: 5,798
  - Density: 4,298/sq mi (1,659/km^{2})
- Time zone: UTC-8 (Pacific)
  - Summer (DST): UTC-7 (PDT)
- ZIP code: 93620
- Area code: 209
- FIPS code: 06-19612
- GNIS feature IDs: 277604, 2410348
- Website: dospalos.gov

Dos Palos (Spanish for "Two Timbers") is a city in southern Merced County, California, United States. Dos Palos is located 27 miles (43 km) south-southwest of Merced, the county seat, at an elevation of 118 feet (36 m). The population was 5,798 at the 2020 census, up from 4,950 at the 2010 census.

== Geography ==
Dos Palos is located in southern Merced County at 36°59′N 120°38′W. It is 17 miles (27 km) southeast of Los Banos and 40 miles (64 km) by road west of Madera.

According to the United States Census Bureau, the city covers an area of 1.35 square miles (3.5 km^{2}), all land.

== History ==
In one of his expeditions during the 1820s along the west side of the San Joaquin Valley, explorer Gabriel Moraga reported the location of two large, isolated poplar trees, which he called "Dos Palos". In 19th-century Spanish usage, palos was used to describe tall pole-like trees or "timbers". Twenty-first century usage often translates it as "sticks". The "Rancho Sanjon de Santa Rita" Mexican land grant cites "Los Dos Palos" or "The Two Trees" as a boundary marker.

In 1891, former school superintendent Bernhard Marks convinced cattle ranch king Henry Miller to develop a small town nearby. They gave it the name "Dos Palos Colony" but pronounced it with their ethnic accents (Marks a Polish Jew and Miller an Alsatian German) as "Dahce Palace". This pronunciation remained for over one hundred years until a recent Spanish pronunciation revival. Marks brought forty pioneer families west from Iowa and Nebraska to establish the community. In 1892, unable to find good water, many of the settlers left. Marks convinced Miller to establish another town two miles away on land unsuitable for farming and ranching due to swamps and unsettling soils. Some of the settlers relocated. This new town was named "Colony Center". In 1906, Dos Palos Colony was renamed South Dos Palos and Colony Center was renamed Dos Palos. The Post Office was briefly misspelled as one word, "Dospalos" but this was changed within a year. Approximately one dozen of the colony's original families still reside locally. Through the years, people from many other locations joined the community. Dos Palos incorporated in 1935.

On January 1, 2008, 6.52 square miles (16.89 km^{2}) surrounding the community of Dos Palos were transferred from Fresno County to Merced County.

== Demographics ==
Historical population
Census	Pop.	Note	%±
1940	978		—
1950	1,394		42.5%
1960	2,028		45.5%
1970	2,496		23.1%
1980	3,121		25.0%
1990	4,196		34.4%
2000	4,581		9.2%
2010	4,950		8.1%
2020	5,798		17.1%
U.S. Decennial Census

=== 2020 census ===
As of the 2020 census, Dos Palos had a population of 5,798. The population density was 4,298.0 inhabitants per square mile (1,659.5/km^{2}). The median age was 32.1 years. The age distribution was 29.8% under the age of 18, 10.0% aged 18 to 24, 26.3% aged 25 to 44, 21.8% aged 45 to 64, and 12.0% who were 65 years of age or older. For every 100 females, there were 96.5 males, and for every 100 females age 18 and over, there were 95.8 males age 18 and over. 99.8% of residents lived in urban areas, while 0.2% lived in rural areas.

The whole population lived in households. There were 1,723 households, of which 50.0% had children under the age of 18 living in them. Of all households, 51.8% were married-couple households, 9.3% were cohabiting couple households, 15.3% were households with a male householder and no spouse or partner present, and 23.6% were households with a female householder and no spouse or partner present. About 14.9% of all households were made up of individuals and 7.5% had someone living alone who was 65 years of age or older. The average household size was 3.37. There were 1,390 families (80.7% of all households).

There were 1,803 housing units at an average density of 1,336.5 units per square mile (516.0 units/km^{2}), of which 1,723 (95.6%) were occupied. Of these, 62.2% were owner-occupied and 37.8% were occupied by renters. Of all housing units, 4.4% were vacant. The homeowner vacancy rate was 1.4% and the rental vacancy rate was 3.6%.

Racial composition as of the 2020 census
Race	Number	Percent
White	2,363	40.8%
Black or African American	143	2.5%
American Indian and Alaska Native	140	2.4%
Asian	56	1.0%
Native Hawaiian and Other Pacific Islander	16	0.3%
Some other race	2,131	36.8%
Two or more races	949	16.4%
Hispanic or Latino (of any race)	4,184	72.2%

=== Demographic estimates ===
In 2023, the US Census Bureau estimated that 32.5% of the population were foreign-born. Of all people aged 5 or older, 46.1% spoke only English at home, 46.6% spoke Spanish, 4.7% spoke other Indo-European languages, and 2.6% spoke Asian or Pacific Islander languages. Of those aged 25 or older, 68.1% were high school graduates and 11.5% had a bachelor's degree.

=== Income and poverty ===
The median household income was $50,556, and the per capita income was $23,385. About 7.8% of families and 14.7% of the population were below the poverty line.

=== 2010 census ===
At the 2010 census Dos Palos had a population of 4,950. The population density was 3,667.3 inhabitants per square mile (1,416.0/km^{2}). The racial makeup of Dos Palos was 3,377 (68.2%) White, 167 (3.4%) African American, 62 (1.3%) Native American, 37 (0.7%) Asian, 4 (0.1%) Pacific Islander, 1,075 (21.7%) from other races, and 228 (4.6%) from two or more races. Hispanic or Latino of any race were 3,075 persons (62.1%).

The census reported that 4,922 people (99.4% of the population) lived in households, no one lived in non-institutionalized group quarters and 28 (0.6%) were institutionalized.

There were 1,501 households, 731 (48.7%) had children under the age of 18 living in them, 816 (54.4%) were opposite-sex married couples living together, 232 (15.5%) had a female householder with no husband present, 130 (8.7%) had a male householder with no wife present. There were 119 (7.9%) unmarried opposite-sex partnerships, and 7 (0.5%) same-sex married couples or partnerships. 261 households (17.4%) were one person and 116 (7.7%) had someone living alone who was 65 or older. The average household size was 3.28. There were 1,178 families (78.5% of households); the average family size was 3.69.

The age distribution was 1,571 people (31.7%) under the age of 18, 532 people (10.7%) aged 18 to 24, 1,199 people (24.2%) aged 25 to 44, 1,114 people (22.5%) aged 45 to 64, and 534 people (10.8%) who were 65 or older. The median age was 31.3 years. For every 100 females, there were 96.1 males. For every 100 females age 18 and over, there were 96.1 males.

There were 1,700 housing units at an average density of 1,259.5 per square mile, of the occupied units 929 (61.9%) were owner-occupied and 572 (38.1%) were rented. The homeowner vacancy rate was 3.2%; the rental vacancy rate was 8.9%. 2,955 people (59.7% of the population) lived in owner-occupied housing units and 1,967 people (39.7%) lived in rental housing units.

== Government ==
In the California State Legislature, Dos Palos is in the 14th senatorial district, represented by Democrat Anna Caballero, and the 27th Assembly district, represented by Democrat Esmeralda Soria.

In the United States House of Representatives, Dos Palos is in California's 13th congressional district and is represented by Democrat Adam Gray.

Members of the Dos Palos City Council serve four year terms. The 92nd and current panel consists of:

- Mayor April Hogue, term ends November 20, 2024
- Mayor Pro Tem Debbie Orlando, term ends November 15, 2022
- Councilmember Armando Bravo, term ends November 20, 2024
- Councilmember Thomas Pigg, term ends November 15, 2022
- Councilmember Marcus Porter, term ends November 20, 2024.

== Notable people ==
- Ana de Alba, lawyer and judge
- Myron Joseph Cotta, bishop, Diocese of Stockton
- Malcolm "Ike" Frankian, NFL football player with New York Giants, coach of Los Angeles Bulldogs, coach at Dos Palos High School
- Dave Henderson, MLB baseball outfielder for Oakland A's and four other teams
- Shawn Hillegas, MLB baseball pitcher for Oakland A's and four other teams
- Cody Martin, MLB pitcher for the Oakland A's and two other teams
