= Delhi, California =

- Census designated place
- Interactive map of Delhi, California
- Location in the United States
- Coordinates: 37°25′56″N 120°46′43″W
- Country: United States
- State: California
- County: Merced

Area
  - Total: 3.51 sq mi (9.09 km^{2})
  - Land: 3.51 sq mi (9.09 km^{2})
  - Water: 0 sq mi (0.00 km^{2}) 0%
- Elevation: 118 ft (36 m)

Population (2020)
  - Total: 10,656
  - Density: 3,035.5/sq mi (1,172.01/km^{2})
- Time zone: UTC-8 (Pacific)
  - Summer (DST): UTC-7 (PDT)
- ZIP code: 95315
- Area code: 209
- FIPS code: 06-18464
- GNIS feature IDs: 1658404, 2408654

Delhi (/ˈdɛlhaɪ/ DEL-hy) is a census-designated place (CDP) in Merced County in the U.S. state of California. Delhi is 18 miles (29 km) west-northwest of Merced, at an elevation of 118 feet (36 m). According to the 2020 census, the population was 10,656.

== Geography ==
Delhi is located in northern Merced County at 37°25′56″N 120°46′43″W. It lies northwest across the Merced River from Livingston. Hilmar is to the west, Turlock is to the north, and Ballico is to the east.

According to the United States Census Bureau, the Delhi CDP has a total area of 3.5 square miles (9.1 km^{2}), all land.

== Government ==
Delhi is the largest unincorporated town in Merced County. The Delhi Municipal Advisory Council advises the Merced County Board of Supervisors concerning any services which are or may be provided within the boundaries of the Delhi School District by the County or other local governmental agencies. It has its own unified school district with three K-through-8th schools, (El Capitan Elementary, Schendel Elementary, and Harmony School), and one high school, (Delhi Educational Park). Delhi's Harmony School opened in 2005. Delhi is in the Turlock Irrigation District, which provides farm water and electrical service. The Delhi County Water District provides drinking water and sewer service.

=== State and federal representation ===
In the California State Legislature, Delhi is in the 4th senatorial district, represented by Republican Marie Alvarado-Gil, and in the 27th Assembly district, represented by Democrat Esmeralda Soria.

In the United States House of Representatives, Delhi is in California's 13th congressional district, represented by Democrat Adam Gray.

== Education and Government ==
Delhi High School, part of the Delhi Unified School District, offers the DMAS (Delhi Medical Academy of Science) program. The DMAS program provides students with insights into the medical field, helping them become more prepared for potential careers in healthcare. California State University, Stanislaus works with the program to provide college level learning experiences.

In the United States House of Representatives, Delhi is in California's 13th congressional district, represented by Democrat Adam Gray as of January 2025.

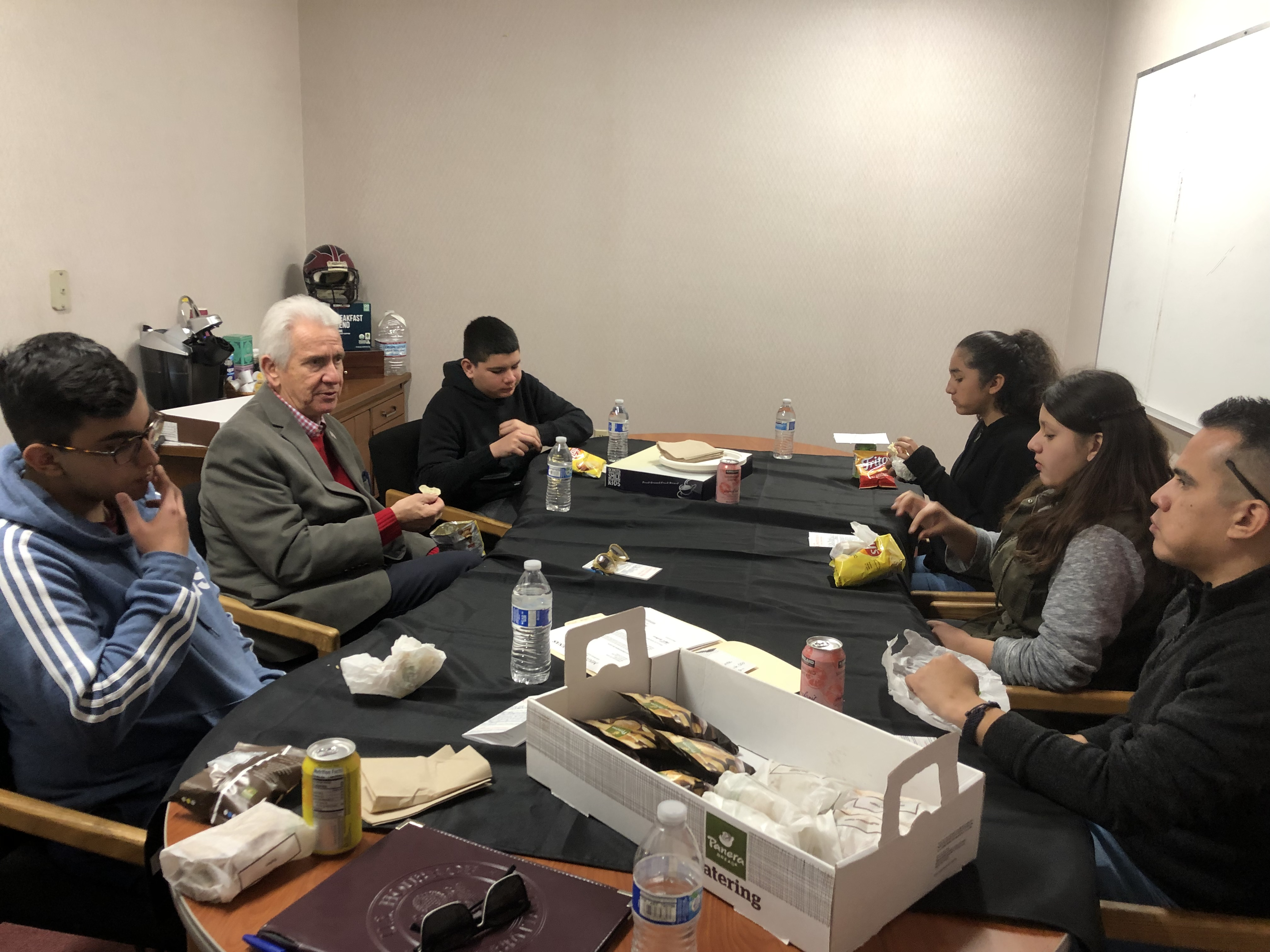
Congressman Jim Costa meeting with students from Delhi Middle School in 2020

== History ==
The Delhi post office opened in 1912, closed in 1918, and reopened in 1920.

The building housing the New Beginnings Christian Center, a Delhi church, was built for display at the World's Fair in San Francisco, in 1939. The building was to be torn down after the fair, but Enoch Christoffersen, who was a mayor of Turlock, California, said it was too nice a church so it was bought and the structure was disassembled and shipped by train to Delhi, where it was re-assembled at its current location at 9711 N. Stephens Street.

== Demographics ==
Historical population
Census	Pop.	Note	%±
1960	1,175		—
1970	2,063		75.6%
1980	2,832		37.3%
1990	3,280		15.8%
2000	8,022		144.6%
2010	10,755		34.1%
2020	10,656		−0.9%
U.S. Decennial Census; 1960 1970 1980; 1990 2000 2010

=== 2020 census ===
As of the 2020 census, Delhi had a population of 10,656. The population density was 3,035.9 inhabitants per square mile (1,172.2/km^{2}). The median age was 30.8 years. The age distribution was 30.1% under the age of 18, 11.1% aged 18 to 24, 27.3% aged 25 to 44, 22.5% aged 45 to 64, and 9.0% who were 65 years of age or older. For every 100 females there were 103.6 males, and for every 100 females age 18 and over there were 101.1 males age 18 and over. 95.6% of residents lived in urban areas, while 4.4% lived in rural areas.

The whole population lived in households. There were 2,757 households, out of which 52.2% included children under the age of 18. Of all households, 61.3% were married-couple households, 5.9% were cohabiting couple households, 14.5% had a male householder with no spouse or partner present, and 18.2% had a female householder with no spouse or partner present. About 10.6% of households were one person, and 4.0% were one person aged 65 or older. The average household size was 3.87. There were 2,354 families (85.4% of all households).

There were 2,840 housing units at an average density of 809.1 units per square mile (312.4 units/km^{2}), of which 2,757 (97.1%) were occupied and 2.9% were vacant. Of occupied housing units, 70.4% were owner-occupied and 29.6% were occupied by renters. The homeowner vacancy rate was 0.9%, and the rental vacancy rate was 3.4%.

Racial composition as of the 2020 census
Race	Number	Percent
White	2,936	27.6%
Black or African American	49	0.5%
American Indian and Alaska Native	303	2.8%
Asian	383	3.6%
Native Hawaiian and Other Pacific Islander	22	0.2%
Some other race	4,938	46.3%
Two or more races	2,025	19.0%
Hispanic or Latino (of any race)	8,497	79.7%

=== 2023 estimates ===
In 2023, the US Census Bureau estimated that 37.7% of the population were foreign-born. Of all people aged 5 or older, 21.3% spoke only English at home, 70.5% spoke Spanish, 5.8% spoke other Indo-European languages, 1.0% spoke Asian or Pacific Islander languages, and 1.3% spoke other languages. Of those aged 25 or older, 63.8% were high school graduates and 14.1% had a bachelor's degree.

The median household income was $66,306, and the per capita income was $24,906. About 12.9% of families and 16.5% of the population were below the poverty line.
