= Hilmar Cheese Company =

California cheese company

Hilmar Cheese Company, Inc.
- Industry: Dairy
- Founded: 1984; 42 years ago
- Headquarters: Hilmar, California, United States
- Products: Cheese, Whey
- Website: hilmarcheese.com

Hilmar Cheese Company is a cheese and whey products manufacturer headquartered in Hilmar, California, United States. The privately owned company has over 1000 employees and specializes in the mass production of a variety of soft and hard cheeses. As of 2011, Hilmar Cheese produced over two million pounds of cheese per day. The company's Hilmar facility produces more cheese per year from a single site than any other cheese manufacturer in the world.

== History ==
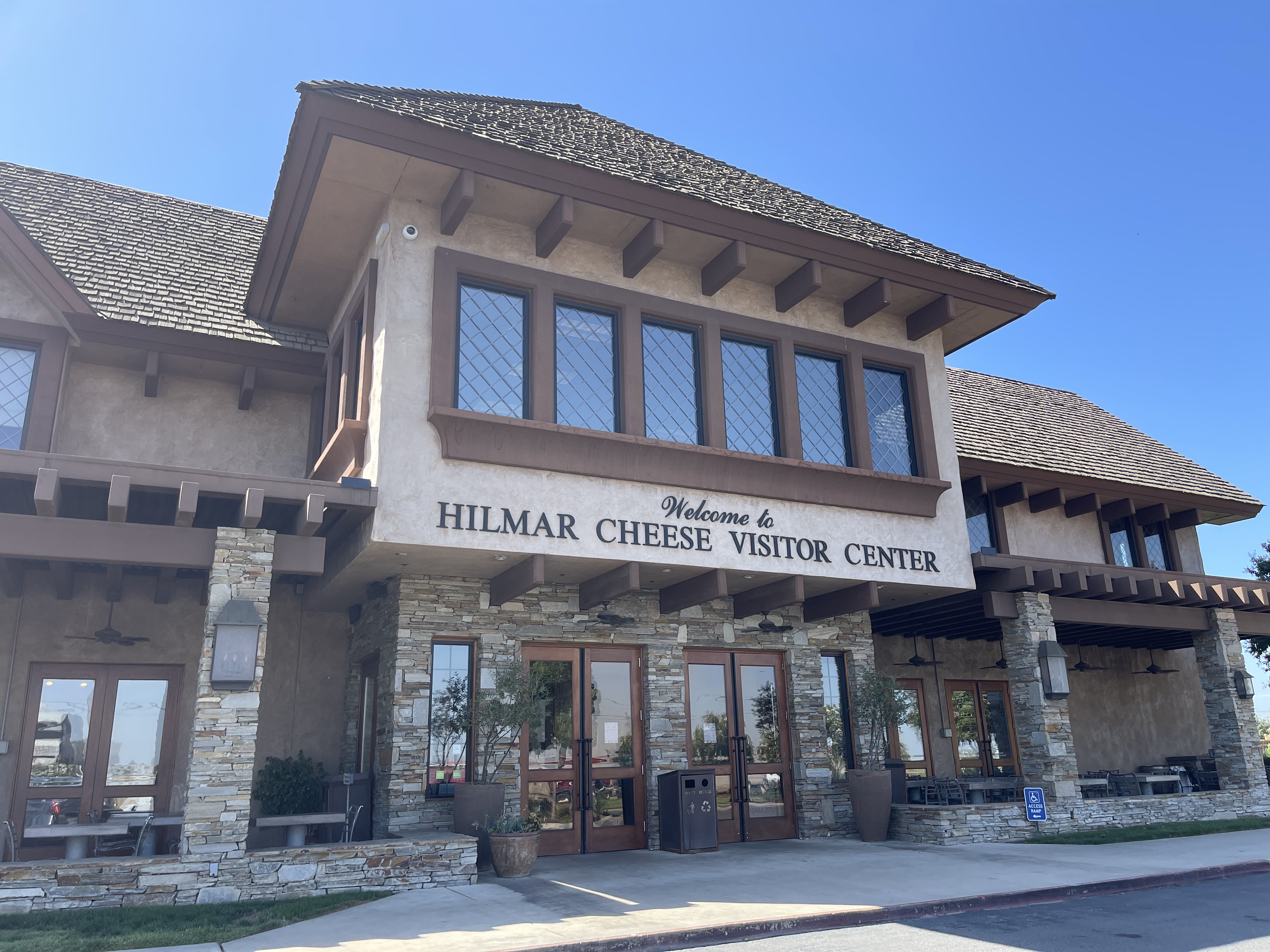
Hilmar Cheese Company Visitor Center on September 8, 2023.

=== Founding ===
The company was founded in 1984 by 12 families located in Hilmar, California; it began production in 1985. Hilmar Ingredients, a division of Hilmar Cheese Company, was founded in 2004 to market the company's whey products to the world. It currently produces over half a million pounds of whey protein and lactose per day and ships to over 40 countries worldwide.

=== Expansion ===
In 2007, Hilmar Cheese opened a cheese and whey protein processing plant in Dalhart, Texas. This plant is the company's first processing plant outside its Hilmar, California, facility and corporate headquarters.

In 2014, Hilmar Cheese opened a milk powder processing plant in Turlock, California. This plant is the company's second processing plant outside its Hilmar, California, facility and corporate headquarters. On April 17, 2019, Hilmar Cheese entered into an agreement with California Dairies, Inc., to sell its Turlock milk powder processing plant.

Ribbon-cutting on the more than $600 million Dodge City, Kansas manufacturing facility was held in March of 2025.

== Pollution Issues ==
In 2004, the Sacramento Bee published a California State Water Resources Control Board report, alleging Hilmar had been polluting the environment by spreading waste byproduct on to farmland since 1989. The report revealed that Hilmar Cheese had been violating state water quality regulations by disposing of whey and other byproducts directly onto land, far above permissible levels, saving millions of dollars in potential waste treatment and disposal costs.

The Water Board was criticized for its reticence to take enforcement action. For 15 years, the Fresno division of the Central Valley Regional Water Quality Control Board had recorded over 4,000 violations of clean water laws:

- In March 1990, regulators noted the waste flow of leftover whey and other untreated cheese wastes had grown to 140,000 gallons a day, more than double the permitted limit.
- In 1997, after years of continuing to violate the limit, the company built a $15 million filtration system. The system worked intermittently and did not produce a profitable whey byproduct as expected.
- Between April 2001 and January 2003, with the filtration system breaking down, Hilmar dumped 10.4 million gallons of high-saline water that was supposed to be hauled away.
- In 2002, following complaints of nearby residents, Hilmar agreed to begin pumping wastewater to a nearby sewage treatment plant. The plan was abandoned when costs for the company came in higher than expected.

This discharge had multiple effects on the local water table, including the drinking water. By 1997, neighbors complained of water smelling foul and causing burning sensations to their skin. In 2004, testing showed the salinity of the groundwater had grown to five times the natural level. Local wells reported rates of arsenic at 1.3x the federal EPA maximum level, and nitrates more than twice the maximum.

Regulators continued to raise the limit on wastewater volume as Hilmar ramped up production. Board records show regulators agreed to increases four times between 1990 and 1997, each time counting on company promises to cut pollution.

The board was criticized for creating a culture in which "we only take cases where we are 100 percent sure we are going to win," says former Water Board engineer Boris Trgovcich. "We only go after the guys who aren't going to fight us. They know Hilmar is going to fight it. This is why it pays to pollute."

Regulatory action was brought against the company following the 2004 Sacramento Bee report. In 2005, the company was ordered to pay a $4 million fine, a record for the Water Board. In 2006, this was negotiated down to a $1 million fine and $1.8 million toward environmental studies.

Hilmar installed underground injection wells in 2006 and again in 2009. In 2023, the company was fined $92,000 for permit violations related to these wells. The violations included failing to maintain a minimum pressure of 100 psi in the annular space of one of its injection wells, and failing to report data as required by the facility permit over a two-month period.
