= Merced County, California =

County in California, United States

Merced County
- County
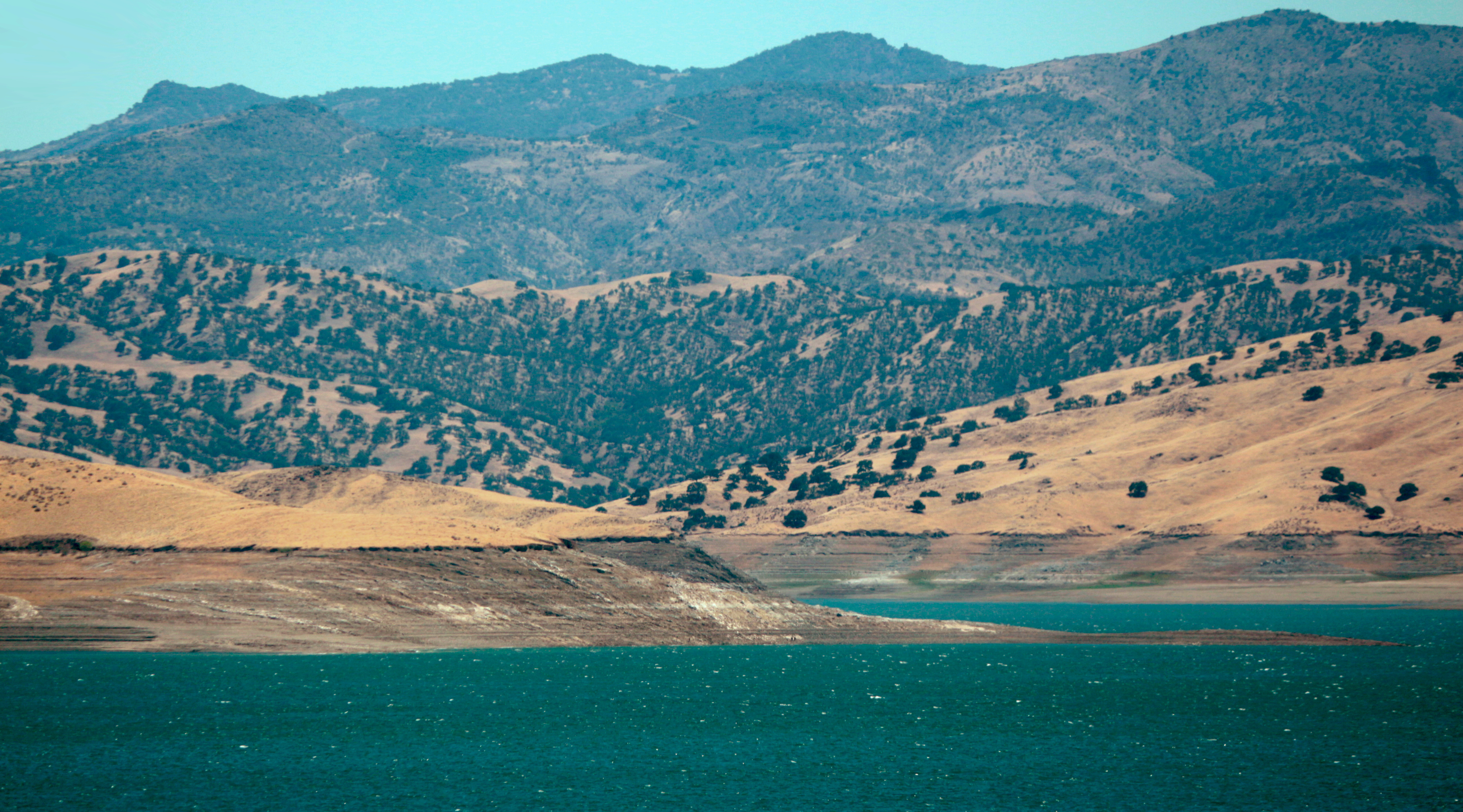
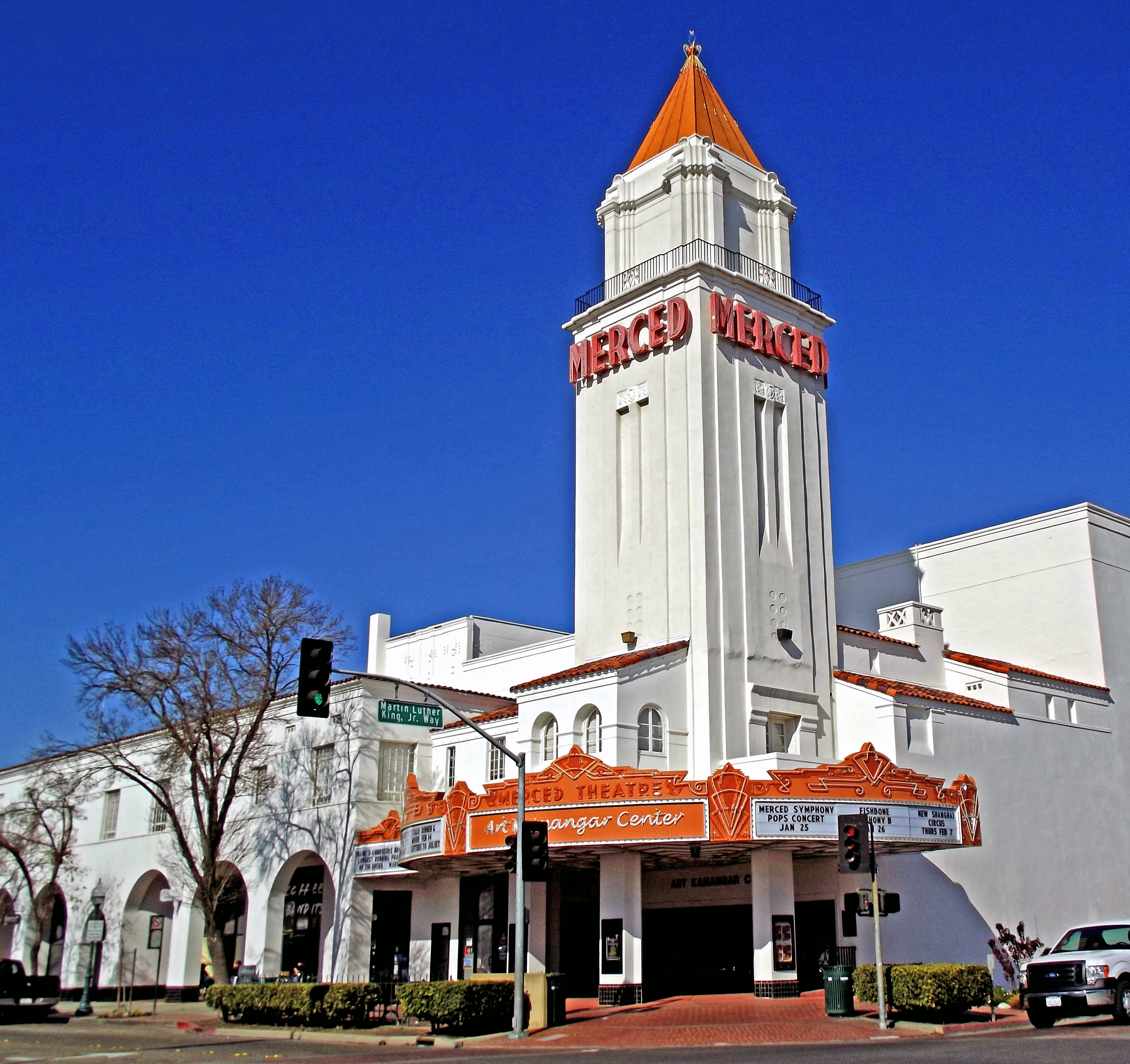
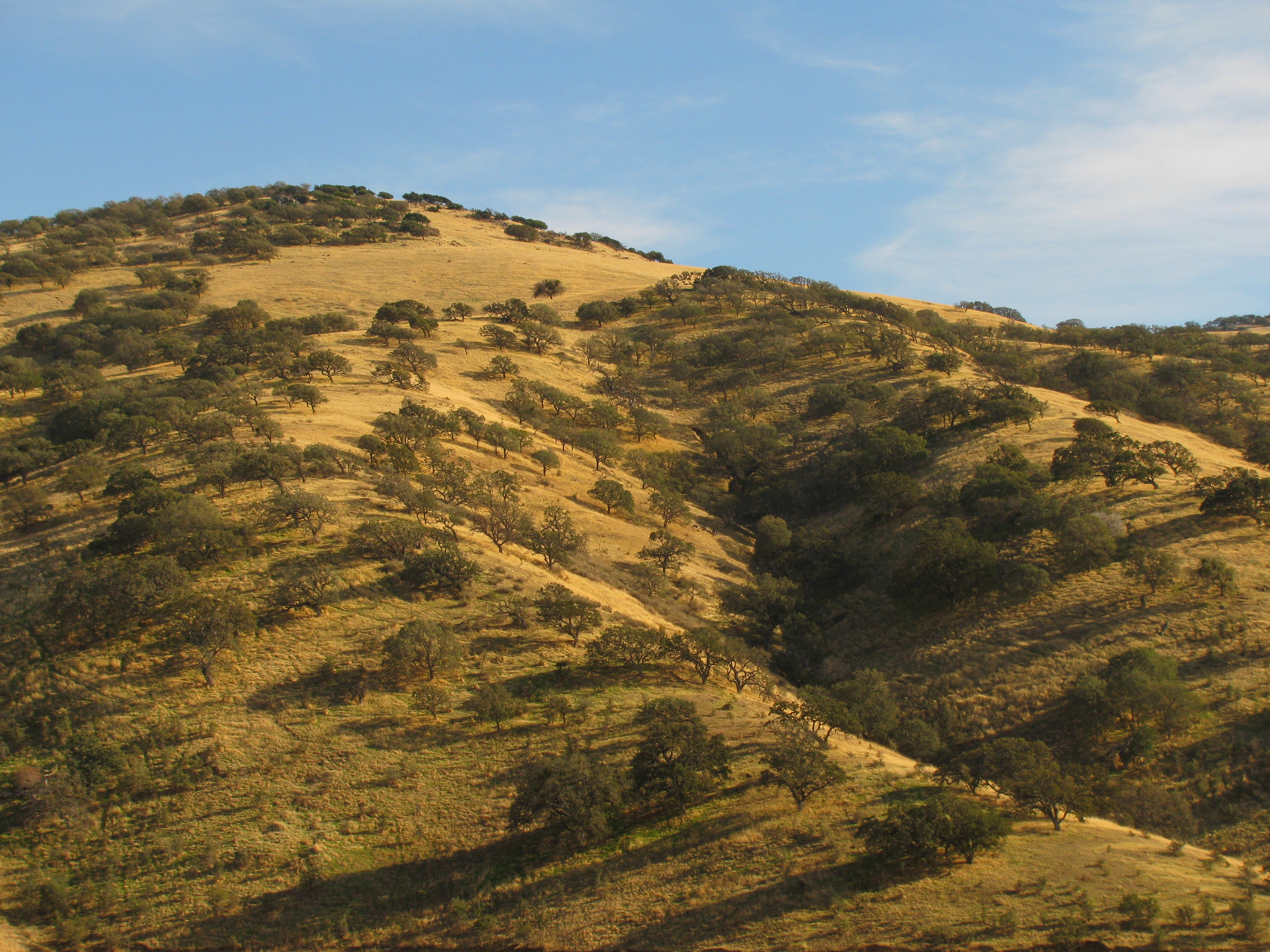
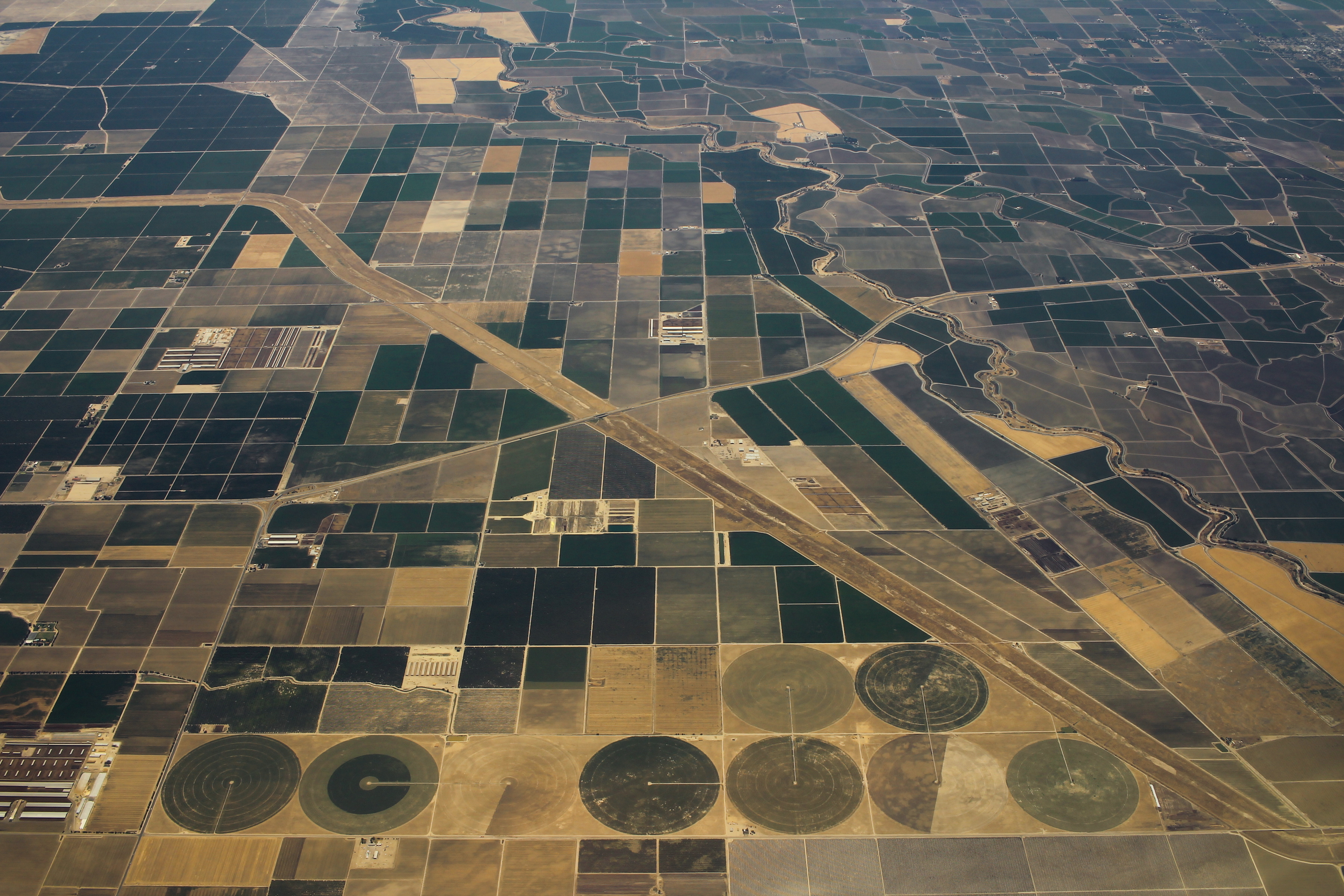
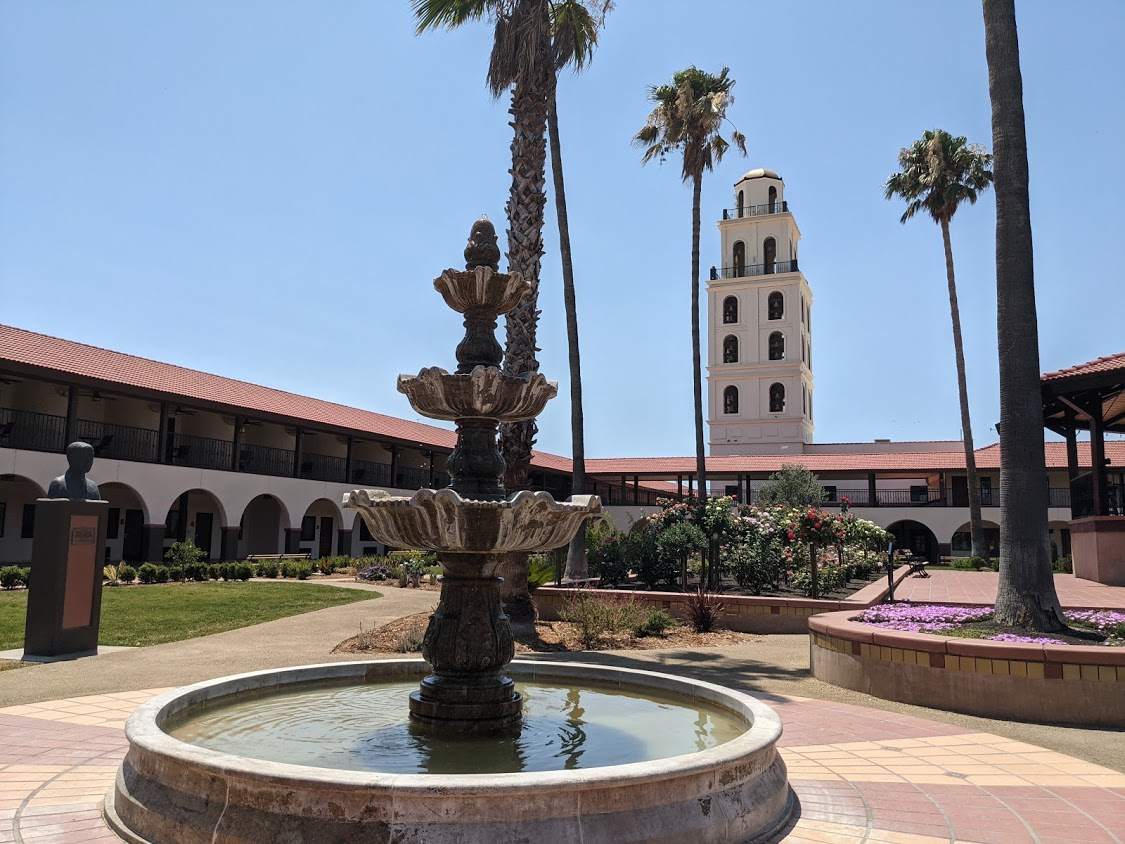
- San Luis Reservoir in the Diablo Range Merced Pacheco State Park El Nido Santa Nella

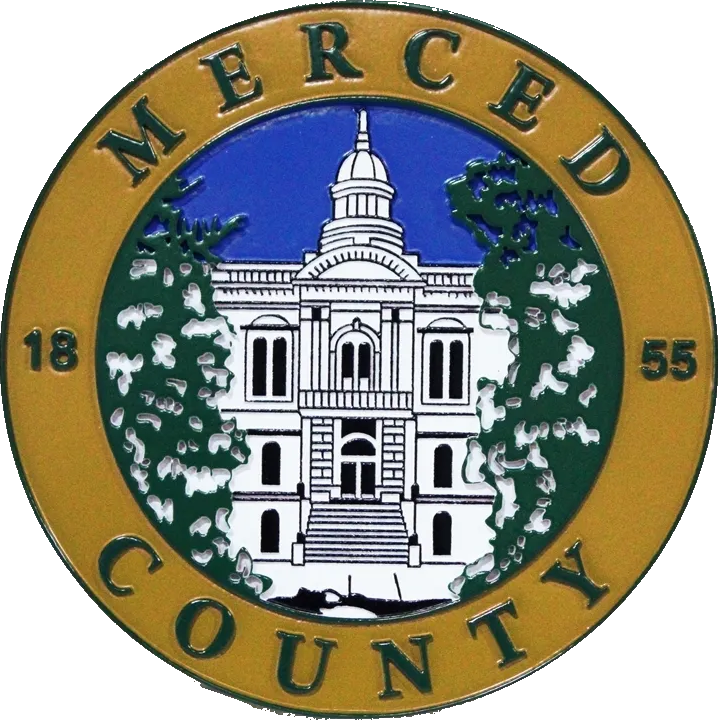
- Seal
- Interactive map of Merced County
- Location in the state of California
- Coordinates: 37.19°N 120.71°W
- Country: United States
- State: California
- Region: San Joaquin Valley
- Incorporated: April 19, 1855
- Named for: Merced River, originally El Río de Nuestra Señora de la Merced ("River of Our Lady of Mercy" in Spanish).
- County seat: Merced
- Largest city: Merced

Government
  - Type: Council–CEO
  - Body: Board of Supervisors
  - Chair: Daron McDaniel
  - Vice Chair: Lloyd Pareira, Jr
  - Board of Supervisors: Supervisors: Jim Pacheco; Josh Pedrozo; Daron McDaniel; Lloyd Pareira, Jr; Scott Silveira
  - Chief executive officer: Raul Lomeli Mendez

Area
  - Total: 1,979 sq mi (5,130 km^{2})
  - Land: 1,935 sq mi (5,010 km^{2})
  - Water: 44 sq mi (110 km^{2})
- Highest elevation: 3,801 ft (1,159 m)

Population (2020)
  - Total: 281,202
  - Estimate (2025): 297,260 ▲
  - Density: 145.3/sq mi (56.11/km^{2})

GDP
  - Total: $11.560 billion (2022)
- Time zone: UTC−8 (Pacific Time Zone)
  - Summer (DST): UTC−7 (Pacific Daylight Time)
- ZIP code: 93620, 93635, 93661, 93665, 95301, 95303, 95312, 95315, 95317, 95322, 95324, 95333, 95334, 95388, 95340, 95341, 95343, 95344, 95348, 95365, 95369, 95374
- Area code: 209
- FIPS code: 06-047
- GNIS feature ID: 277288
- Congressional district: 13th
- Website: www.co.merced.ca.us

Merced County (/mɜːr.ˈsɛd/ mur-SED; Merced, Spanish for "Mercy") is a county located in the northern San Joaquin Valley section of the Central Valley, in the U.S. state of California.

As of the 2020 census, the population was 281,202. The county seat is Merced. The county is named after the Merced River.

Merced County comprises the Merced, California metropolitan statistical area, which is included in the San Jose–San Francisco–Oakland combined statistical area. It is located north of Fresno County and Fresno, and southeast of Santa Clara County and San Jose.

== History ==
The county derives its name from the Merced River, or El Río de Nuestra Señora de la Merced (River of Our Lady of Mercy), named in 1806 by an expedition headed by Gabriel Moraga, which came upon it at the end of a hot dusty ride on the El Camino Viejo across the San Joaquin Valley in Spanish colonial Las Californias Province.

Between 1841 and 1844, during the period when Alta California was a territory of independent Mexico, four Mexican land grants were made in what became Merced County: Rancho Orestimba y Las Garzas, Rancho Panoche de San Juan y Los Carrisolitos, Rancho San Luis Gonzaga, and Rancho Sanjon de Santa Rita

Merced County was formed in 1855 from parts of Mariposa County. Parts of its territory were given to Fresno County in 1856.

== Geography ==
According to the U.S. Census Bureau, the county has a total area of 1,979 square miles (5,130 km^{2}), of which 1,935 square miles (5,010 km^{2}) is land and 44 square miles (110 km^{2}) (2.2%) is water.

=== National protected areas ===
- Merced National Wildlife Refuge
- San Luis National Wildlife Refuge

== Demographics ==
Historical population
Census	Pop.	Note	%±
1860	1,141		—
1870	2,807		146.0%
1880	5,656		101.5%
1890	8,085		42.9%
1900	9,215		14.0%
1910	15,148		64.4%
1920	24,579		62.3%
1930	36,748		49.5%
1940	46,988		27.9%
1950	69,780		48.5%
1960	90,446		29.6%
1970	104,629		15.7%
1980	134,560		28.6%
1990	178,403		32.6%
2000	210,554		18.0%
2010	255,793		21.5%
2020	281,202		9.9%
2025 (est.)	297,260	▲	5.7%
U.S. Decennial Census; 1790–1960 1900–1990; 1990–2000 2010 2020

=== 2020 census ===
As of the 2020 census, the county had a population of 281,202. The median age was 32.0 years. 28.8% of residents were under the age of 18 and 11.9% of residents were 65 years of age or older. For every 100 females there were 99.6 males, and for every 100 females age 18 and over there were 97.7 males age 18 and over.

The racial makeup of the county was 37.2% White, 3.3% Black or African American, 2.7% American Indian and Alaska Native, 7.4% Asian, 0.3% Native Hawaiian and Pacific Islander, 31.7% from some other race, and 17.6% from two or more races. Hispanic or Latino residents of any race comprised 61.8% of the population.

83.2% of residents lived in urban areas, while 16.8% lived in rural areas.

There were 83,464 households in the county, of which 45.1% had children under the age of 18 living with them and 25.2% had a female householder with no spouse or partner present. About 17.2% of all households were made up of individuals and 7.9% had someone living alone who was 65 years of age or older.

There were 87,783 housing units, of which 4.9% were vacant. Among occupied housing units, 54.7% were owner-occupied and 45.3% were renter-occupied. The homeowner vacancy rate was 1.1% and the rental vacancy rate was 3.9%.

=== Racial and ethnic composition ===
Merced County, California – Racial and ethnic composition Note: the US Census treats Hispanic/Latino as an ethnic category. This table excludes Latinos from the racial categories and assigns them to a separate category. Hispanics/Latinos may be of any race.
Race / Ethnicity (NH = Non-Hispanic)	Pop 1980	Pop 1990	Pop 2000	Pop 2010	Pop 2020	% 1980	% 1990	% 2000	% 2010	% 2020
White alone (NH)	89,006	96,701	85,585	81,599	68,729	66.15%	54.20%	40.65%	31.90%	24.44%
Black or African American alone (NH)	6,618	7,889	7,594	8,785	8,191	4.92%	4.42%	3.61%	3.43%	2.91%
Native American or Alaska Native alone (NH)	1,091	1,135	1,115	1,126	1,164	0.81%	0.64%	0.53%	0.44%	0.41%
Asian alone (NH)	2,891	14,109	14,041	18,183	19,824	2.15%	7.91%	6.67%	7.11%	7.05%
Native Hawaiian or Pacific Islander alone (NH)	x	x	281	476	617	0.13%	0.19%	0.13%	0.19%	0.22%
Other race alone (NH)	900	462	410	439	1,242	0.67%	0.26%	0.19%	0.17%	0.44%
Mixed race or Multiracial (NH)	x	x	6,062	4,700	7,578	x	x	2.88%	1.84%	2.69%
Hispanic or Latino (any race)	34,054	58,107	95,466	140,485	173,857	25.31%	32.57%	45.34%	54.92%	61.83%
Total	134,560	178,403	210,554	255,793	281,202	100.00%	100.00%	100.00%	100.00%	100.00%

=== American Community Survey 2025 data ===
The United States Census Bureau estimated that in 2025, Merced County’s population was 297.260. It was also estimated that the county's population was 21,59% Non-Hispanic White, 64,88% Hispanic or Latino, 2,95% Non-Hispanic Black, 7,53% Asian, 0,41% Native American, 0,24% Pacific Islander, and 2,39% Multiracial.

Total	Population	Percentage
Non-Hispanic White	64.175	21,59%
Hispanic or Latino	192.856	64,88%
Non-Hispanic Black	8.772	2,95%
Asian	22.389	7,53%
Native American	1.229	0,41%
Pacific Islander	724	0,24%
Non-Hispanic Multiracial	7.115	2,39%

=== 2010 census ===
The 2010 United States census reported that Merced County had a population of 255,793. The racial makeup of Merced County was 148,381 (58.0%) White, 9,926 (3.9%) African American, 3,473 (1.4%) Native American, 18,836 (7.4%) Asian, 583 (0.2%) Pacific Islander, 62,665 (24.5%) from other races, and 11,929 (4.7%) from two or more races. Hispanic or Latino of any race were 140,485 persons (54.9%).

Population reported at 2010 United States census
The County	Total; Population	White	African; American	Native; American	Asian	Pacific; Islander	other races	two or more races	Hispanic or Latino (of any race)
Merced County	255,793	148,381	9,926	3,473	18,836	583	62,665	11,929	140,485
Incorporated city	Total; Population	White	African; American	Native; American	Asian	Pacific; Islander	other races	two or more races	Hispanic or Latino (of any race)
Atwater	28,168	18,410	1,225	364	1,416	76	5,300	1,377	14,808
Dos Palos	4,950	3,377	167	62	37	4	1,075	228	3,075
Gustine	5,520	3,875	73	54	95	8	1,191	224	2,769
Livingston	13,058	5,263	106	348	2,223	18	4,547	553	9,547
Los Banos	35,972	20,846	1,354	512	1,162	134	10,123	1,841	23,346
Merced	78,958	41,177	4,958	1,153	9,342	174	17,804	4,350	39,140
Census-designated place	Total; Population	White	African; American	Native; American	Asian	Pacific; Islander	other races	two or more races	Hispanic or Latino (of any race)
Ballico	406	237	2	3	11	2	128	23	210
Bear Creek	290	156	4	2	14	0	93	21	170
Cressey	394	253	1	3	15	1	95	26	195
Delhi	10,755	5,655	118	157	405	30	3,930	460	7,706
Dos Palos Y	323	225	1	8	1	0	82	6	197
El Nido	330	162	0	7	9	0	147	5	245
Franklin	6,149	3,455	273	77	931	12	1,072	329	3,250
Hilmar-Irwin	5,197	4,475	15	23	87	1	439	157	916
Le Grand	1,659	869	19	35	17	1	659	59	1,357
McSwain	4,171	3,196	56	34	282	9	422	172	1,081
Planada	4,584	1,681	22	23	46	1	2,725	86	4,347
Santa Nella	1,380	832	22	25	31	0	433	37	968
Snelling	231	206	0	3	6	0	13	3	33
South Dos Palos	1,620	809	135	21	36	10	552	57	1,262
Stevinson	313	228	4	0	0	0	73	8	133
Tuttle	103	77	6	0	6	0	9	5	31
University of California, Merced	0	0	0	0	0	0	0	0	0
Volta	246	201	7	0	1	4	29	4	132
Winton	10,613	5,696	175	140	701	8	3,455	438	7,566
Other unincorporated areas	Total; Population	White	African; American	Native; American	Asian	Pacific; Islander	other races	two or more races	Hispanic or Latino (of any race)
All others not CDPs (combined)	40,403	27,020	1,183	419	1,962	90	8,269	1,460	18,001

=== 2000 ===
As of the census of 2000, there were 210,554 people, 63,815 households, and 49,775 families residing in the county. The population density was 109 people per square mile (42 people/km^{2}). There were 68,373 housing units at an average density of 36 units per square mile (14 units/km^{2}). The racial makeup of the county was 56.2% White, 3.8% Black or African American, 1.2% Native American, 6.8% Asian, 0.2% Pacific Islander, 26.1% from other races, and 5.7% from two or more races. 45.3% of the population were Hispanic or Latino of any race. 6.6% were of Portuguese and 6.0% German ancestry according to Census 2000. 55.1% spoke English, 35.3% Spanish, 3.2% Hmong, 2.9% Portuguese and 1.0% Punjabi as their first language.

There were 63,815 households, out of which 45.4% had children under the age of 18 living with them, 57.8% were married couples living together, 14.1% had a female householder with no husband present, and 22.0% were non-families. 17.7% of all households were made up of individuals, and 7.4% had someone living alone who was 65 years of age or older. The average household size was 3.25 and the average family size was 3.69.

In the county, the population was spread out, with 34.5% under the age of 18, 10.3% from 18 to 24, 27.9% from 25 to 44, 17.8% from 45 to 64, and 9.5% who were 65 years of age or older. The median age was 29 years. For every 100 females there were 99.3 males. For every 100 females age 18 and over, there were 96.6 males.

The median income for a household in the county was $35,532, and the median income for a family was $38,009. Males had a median income of $31,721 versus $23,911 for females. The per capita income for the county was $14,257. About 16.9% of families and 21.7% of the population were below the poverty line, including 28.4% of those under age 18 and 10.7% of those age 65 or over.

As of 2008, according to the Lao Family Community, a nonprofit organization, about 8,000 Hmong lived in Merced County.

== Government and policing ==
=== County government ===
Merced County is a California Constitution defined general law county and is governed by an elected Board of Supervisors. The Board consists of five members, elected by districts, who serve four-year staggered terms.

=== Merced County Sheriff's Office ===
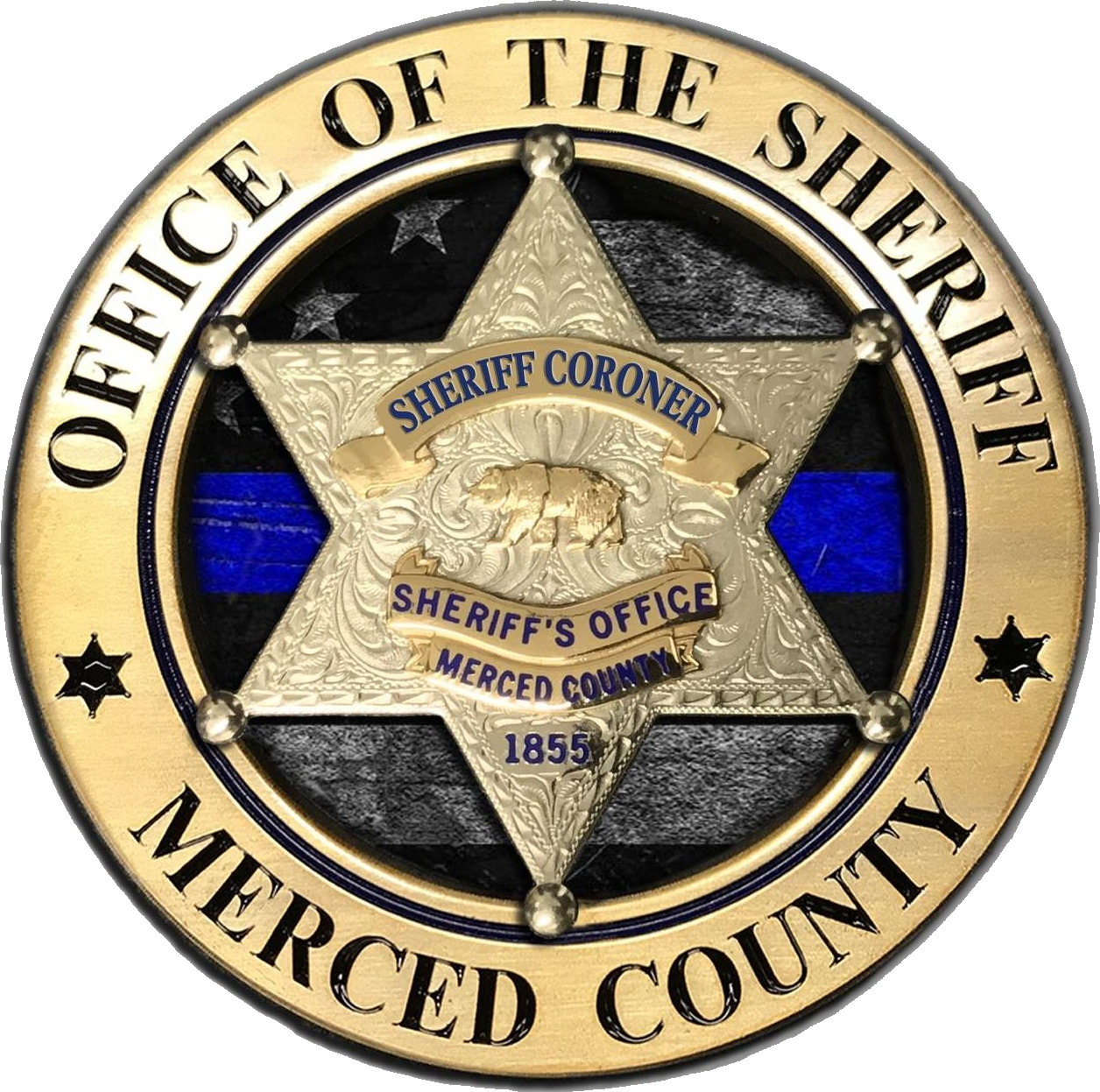
The seal of the Merced County Sheriff's Office.

The Merced County Sheriff's Office provides court protection, jail administration, and coroner service for the entire county. It provides patrol, detective, and other police services for the unincorporated parts of the county. The main sheriff station and offices are at Merced. There are two sheriff's substations. A Grand Jury report in 2010 stated that the Sheriff processed 12,746 average jail bookings per year with an average daily jail population of 1,123.

=== Municipal police departments ===
Municipal police departments in the county are: Merced, population 83,000; Los Banos, population 38,000; Atwater, population 30,000; Livingston, population 13,000; Gustine, population 6,000; Dos Palos, population 5,500.

=== State and federal representation ===
In the United States House of Representatives, Merced County is in California's 13th congressional district, represented by Democrat Adam Gray.

In the California State Senate, Merced County is divided between the 4th senatorial district, represented by Republican Marie Alvarado-Gil, and the 14th senatorial district, represented by Democrat Anna Caballero. In the California State Assembly, the county is divided between the 22nd Assembly district, represented by Republican Juan Alanis, and the 27th Assembly district, represented by Democrat Esmeralda Soria.

== Politics ==
=== Voter registration statistics ===
Population and registered voters
Total population	253,606	
Registered voters (Note: Percentage of registered voters with respect to total population. Percentages of party members with respect to registered voters follow.)	98,874	39.0%
Democratic	43,981	44.5%
Republican	32,767	33.1%
Democratic–Republican spread	+11,214	+11.4%
Independent	3,016	3.1%
Green	568	0.6%
Libertarian	483	0.5%
Peace and Freedom	318	0.3%
Americans Elect	2	0.0%
Other	180	0.2%
No party preference	17,559	17.8%

==== Cities by population and voter registration ====
Cities by population and voter registration
City	Population	Registered voters	Democratic	Republican	D–R spread	Other	No party preference
Atwater	27,922	41.0%	39.4%	37.4%	+2.0%	8.2%	18.3%
Dos Palos	4,940	38.0%	44.4%	35.0%	+9.4%	9.9%	14.9%
Gustine	5,484	38.3%	48.2%	30.3%	+17.9%	7.7%	17.0%
Livingston	12,899	34.6%	62.2%	15.9%	+46.3%	4.9%	18.9%
Los Banos	35,252	37.6%	50.1%	27.6%	+22.5%	7.8%	17.7%
Merced	78,111	41.0%	46.4%	30.2%	+16.2%	8.2%	18.3%

=== Overview ===
Merced County has been somewhat of a bellwether county for presidential elections. Since 1916, it has voted for the winner in each election except in 1956 when it voted for Adlai Stevenson II instead of Dwight D. Eisenhower, 1968 when it voted for Hubert Humphrey instead of Richard Nixon, and 2016 when it voted for Hillary Clinton instead of Donald Trump. In 2024, Donald Trump won the county in a slim victory, continuing the county's bellwether county status.

Trump's win in Merced County made it one of ten counties in California to flip from Biden to Trump, as well as making Merced one of six counties to vote for the Republican presidential candidate for the first time in 20 years since George W. Bush in 2004. Democrat Barack Obama won a majority in the county in both 2008 and 2012. Before that, Republican George W. Bush won a majority in the county in both 2000 and 2004.

United States presidential election results for Merced County, California (Note: This total comprised 1,571 votes for Progressive Theodore Roosevelt (who was official Republican nominee in California), 441 votes for Socialist Eugene V. Debs and 228 votes for Prohibition Party nominee Eugene W. Chafin.)
Year	Republican		Democratic		Third party(ies)	
Year	No.	%	No.	%	No.	%
1880	516	41.08%	736	58.60%	4	0.32%
1884	809	45.47%	953	53.57%	17	0.96%
1888	773	43.04%	972	54.12%	51	2.84%
1892	782	39.66%	995	50.46%	195	9.89%
1896	653	36.24%	1,117	61.99%	32	1.78%
1900	811	41.59%	1,081	55.44%	58	2.97%
1904	972	49.07%	863	43.56%	146	7.37%
1908	1,107	44.58%	1,100	44.30%	276	11.12%
1912	10	0.24%	1,978	46.78%	2,240	52.98%
1916	2,132	40.72%	2,637	50.36%	467	8.92%
1920	3,457	62.99%	1,537	28.01%	494	9.00%
1924	3,573	52.94%	710	10.52%	2,466	36.54%
1928	4,644	60.17%	2,970	38.48%	104	1.35%
1932	2,920	27.20%	7,202	67.10%	612	5.70%
1936	3,230	25.50%	9,208	72.69%	230	1.82%
1940	6,101	36.35%	10,501	62.57%	182	1.08%
1944	6,518	41.31%	9,192	58.25%	69	0.44%
1948	7,721	42.60%	9,959	54.95%	444	2.45%
1952	13,512	53.26%	11,639	45.88%	219	0.86%
1956	11,430	45.99%	13,366	53.78%	56	0.23%
1960	11,990	43.37%	15,545	56.23%	111	0.40%
1964	8,814	31.18%	19,431	68.74%	24	0.08%
1968	11,595	40.90%	14,453	50.98%	2,301	8.12%
1972	17,737	54.33%	13,914	42.62%	997	3.05%
1976	14,842	46.08%	16,637	51.65%	729	2.26%
1980	18,043	48.77%	15,886	42.94%	3,067	8.29%
1984	24,997	58.85%	17,012	40.05%	468	1.10%
1988	21,717	51.20%	20,105	47.40%	592	1.40%
1992	17,981	36.48%	20,133	40.85%	11,170	22.66%
1996	20,847	44.41%	21,786	46.41%	4,305	9.17%
2000	26,102	51.77%	22,726	45.08%	1,590	3.15%
2004	32,773	56.54%	24,491	42.26%	696	1.20%
2008	28,704	44.98%	34,031	53.33%	1,073	1.68%
2012	27,581	44.44%	33,005	53.18%	1,471	2.37%
2016	28,725	40.58%	37,317	52.72%	4,747	6.71%
2020	39,397	43.51%	48,991	54.10%	2,166	2.39%
2024	43,955	50.87%	40,190	46.51%	2,266	2.62%

According to the California Secretary of State, as of October 20, 2008, there were 97,179 registered voters in Merced County. Of those, 44,704 (46.0%) are registered Democratic, 35,955 (37.0%) are registered Republican, 3,090 (3.2%) are registered with other political parties, and 13,430 (13.8%) declined to state a political party. Atwater and the county's unincorporated areas have Republican plurality registration advantages. All of the other cities and towns in the county have Democratic pluralities or majorities in voter registration. Merced County has seen a rightward tilt in recent years, voting "Yes" in the 2021 gubernatorial recall election despite voting for Governor Gavin Newsom by a margin of 4% in 2018. The county then voted for Republican nominee Brian Dahle in 2022 over Newsom, as well as for all Republican nominees for statewide office.

Merced County voted in favor of Proposition 8 in 2008 (which banned same-sex marriage by constitutional amendment) and voted against Proposition 3 in 2024 (which repealed Proposition 8). The level of support in the county for retaining the ban shrank from 70.8% in 2008 to 50.2% in 2024.

== Crime ==
The following table includes the number of incidents reported and the rate per 1,000 persons for each type of offense.

Population and crime rates
Population	253,606	
Violent crime	1,658	6.54
Homicide	26	0.10
Forcible rape	78	0.31
Robbery	276	1.09
Aggravated assault	1,278	5.04
Property crime	4,390	17.31
Burglary	2,318	9.14
Larceny-theft	5,089	20.07
Motor vehicle theft	903	3.56
Arson	90	0.35

=== Cities by population and crime rates ===
Cities by population and crime rates
City	Population	Violent crimes	Violent crime rate per 1,000 persons	Property crimes	Property crime rate per 1,000 persons
Atwater	28,891	180	6.23	1,400	48.46
Dos Palos	5,079	59	11.62	162	31.90
Gustine	5,663	24	4.24	120	21.19
Livingston	13,394	74	5.52	306	22.85
Los Banos	36,897	142	3.85	1,210	32.79
Merced	80,976	810	10.00	4,111	50.77

== Economy ==
According to America's Labor Market Information System 2014 report, the companies with the largest employment in Merced are, in alphabetical order:

- Anberry Rehabilitation Hospital
- Atwater Elementary Teachers
- Bianchi & Sons Packing Co (produce)
- E & J Gallo Winery
- Foster Farms
- Golden Valley Health Center
- Hilmar Cheese Company
- J. Marchini & Son (farming)
- Liberty Packing Co
- Live Oak Farms (produce)
- Livingston District Office (education)
- Malibu Boats West Inc
- McLane Pacific (wholesale food services)
- Merced County Human Services
- Mercy Medical Center Merced
- Pacific Gas and Electric Company
- Quad/Graphics (printing)
- Sensient Dehydrated Flavors
- University of California, Merced
- Walmart
- Werner Co (ladders)
- Western Marketing & Sales (farming)
- Yosemite Wholesale Warehouse

Merced County grows 90% of California's sweet potato crop, due in part to the efforts of John Buttencourt Avila, called "the father of the sweet potato industry".

== Transportation ==
=== Major highways ===
- Interstate 5
- State Route 33
- State Route 59
- State Route 99
- State Route 140
- State Route 152
- State Route 165

=== Public transportation ===
- Merced County Transit, or "The Bus", provides local service in Merced as well as connecting service between most cities in Merced County.
- The University of California, Merced, operates its own transit system, Cat Tracks. This system connects with Merced County Transit.
- Yosemite Area Regional Transportation System, or YARTS, connects Merced with Yosemite National Park.
- Greyhound buses and Amtrak trains provide long-distance intercity service.

=== Airports ===
Merced Regional Airport, located two miles (3.2 km) southwest of downtown Merced, provides passenger air service. General aviation airports in the county include Castle Airport, Gustine Airport, and Los Banos Municipal Airport.

== Communities ==
=== Cities ===
- Atwater
- Dos Palos
- Gustine
- Livingston
- Los Banos
- Merced (county seat)

=== Census-designated places ===
- Ballico
- Bear Creek
- Cressey
- Delhi
- Dos Palos Y
- El Nido
- Franklin
- Hilmar-Irwin
- Le Grand
- McSwain
- Planada
- Santa Nella
- Snelling
- South Dos Palos
- Stevinson
- Tuttle
- University of California Merced
- Volta
- Winton

=== Population ranking ===
The population ranking of the following table is based on the 2020 census of Merced County.

† county seat

Rank	City/Town/etc.	Municipal type	Population (2020 census)
1	† Merced	City	86,333
2	Los Banos	City	45,532
3	Atwater	City	31,970
4	Livingston	City	14,172
5	Winton	CDP	11,709
6	Delhi	CDP	10,656
7	Franklin-Beachwood	CDP	6,919
8	Gustine	City	6,110
9	Dos Palos	City	5,798
10	Hilmar-Irwin	CDP	5,164
11	McSwain	CDP	4,480
12	Planada	CDP	4,164
13	Santa Nella	CDP	2,211
14	South Dos Palos	CDP	1,747
15	Le Grand	CDP	1,592
16-T	Cressey	CDP	366
16-T	Volta	CDP	366
18	Ballico	CDP	347
19	El Nido	CDP	331
20	Dos Palos Y	CDP	310
21	Stevinson	CDP	275
22	Bear Creek	CDP	273
23	Snelling	CDP	238
24	Tuttle	CDP	102
25	University of California Merced	CDP	0

== Education ==
School districts include:

K-12:

- Dos Palos-Oro Loma Joint Unified School District
- Delhi Unified School District
- Gustine Unified School District
- Hilmar Unified School District
- Los Banos Unified School District
- Turlock Unified School District

Secondary:

- Le Grand Union High School District
- Merced Union High School District

Elementary:

- Atwater Elementary School District
- Ballico-Cressey Elementary School District
- El Nido Elementary School District
- Le Grand Union Elementary School District
- Livingston Union School District
- McSwain Union Elementary School District
- Merced City Elementary School District
- Merced River Union Elementary School District
- Plainsburg Union Elementary School District
- Planada Elementary School District
- Snelling-Merced Falls Union Elementary School District
- Weaver Union Elementary School District
- Winton School District

University of California Merced is in the county.

== Places of interest ==
The former Castle Air Force Base and the United States Penitentiary, Atwater are located in an unincorporated area near Atwater.

== See also ==
- List of California Historical Landmarks
- List of museums in the San Joaquin Valley
- List of school districts in Merced County, California
- National Register of Historic Places listings in Merced County, California
