= List of California communities with Hispanic majority populations in the 2010 census =

The following is a list of California cities, towns, and census-designated places in which a majority (over 50%) of the population is Hispanic or Latino, according to data from the 2010 Census.

Note: Although Hispanics or Latinos form 50% or more of the population, they are still outnumbered by non Hispanics in terms of population. The following places highlighted in bold Indicates that Hispanics or Latinos both form 50% or more of the population and where Hispanics outnumber any specific non-Hispanic racial group.

== Places with over 100,000 people ==
- **Anaheim** (52.8%)
- **Chula Vista** (58.2%)
- **Downey** (70.7%)
- **East Los Angeles** (97.1%)
- **El Monte** (69.0%)
- **Escondido** (51.7%)
- **Fontana** (66.8%)
- **Inglewood** (50.6%)
- **Jurupa Valley** (71.4%)
- **Moreno Valley** (54.4%)
- **Norwalk** (70.1%)
- **Ontario** (69.0%)
- **Oxnard** (73.5%)
- **Palmdale** (54.4%)
- **Pomona** (70.5%)
- **Riverside** (53.7%)
- **Salinas** (75.0%)
- **San Bernardino** (60.0%)
- **Santa Ana** (78.2%)
- **Santa Maria** (72.9%)
- **West Covina** (53.2%)

== Places with between 25,000 and 100,000 people ==
- **Adelanto** (58.3%)
- Atwater (52.6%)
- **Azusa** (67.6%)
- **Baldwin Park** (80.1%)
- **Bellflower** (52.3%)
- **Bell Gardens** (95.7%)
- **Bell** (93.1%)
- **Calexico** (96.8%)
- Cathedral City (58.8%)
- Ceres (56.0%)
- Chino (53.8%)
- **Coachella** (96.4%)
- **Colton** (71.0%)
- **Compton** (65.0%)
- Covina (52.4%)
- **Delano** (71.5%)
- Desert Hot Springs (52.6%)
- **East Palo Alto** (64.5%)
- **El Centro** (81.6%)
- **Florence-Graham** (90.0%)
- Gilroy (57.8%)
- **Hawthorne** (52.9%)
- **Hollister** (65.7%)
- **Huntington Park** (97.1%)
- **Indio** (67.8%)
- La Habra (57.2%)
- **La Puente** (85.1%)
- **Lawndale** (61.0%)
- Lompoc (50.8%)
- **Los Banos** (64.9%)
- **Lynwood** (86.6%)
- **Madera** (76.7%)
- **Maywood** (97.4%)
- **Montclair** (70.2%)
- **Montebello** (79.3%)
- **National City** (63.0%)
- **Paramount** (78.6%)
- **Perris** (71.8%)
- **Pico Rivera** (91.2%)
- **Porterville** (61.9%)
- **Rialto** (67.6%)
- **Rubidoux** (Jurupa Valley) (68.0%)
- San Jacinto (52.3%)
- **San Pablo** (56.5%)
- **Santa Paula** (79.5%)
- **Soledad** (71.1%)
- **South Gate** (94.8%)
- **South Whittier** (77.1%)
- **Stanton** (50.8%)
- Tulare (57.5%)
- **Wasco** (76.7%)
- **Watsonville** (81.4%)
- **West Whittier-Los Nietos** (87.6%)
- **Whittier** (65.7%)
- **Willowbrook** (63.9%)

== Places with between 10,000 and 25,000 people ==
- **Alum Rock** (70.7%)
- **Arvin** (92.7%)
- **Avenal** (71.8%)
- **Avocado Heights** (82.1%)
- **Bay Point** (54.9%)
- **Bloomington** (81.0%)
- Blythe (53.2%)
- **Brawley** (81.5%)
- **Cherryland** (54.0%)
- **Citrus** (72.8%)
- Coalinga (53.5%)
- **Commerce** (94.5%)
- **Corcoran** (62.6%)
- **Cudahy** (96.0%)
- **Delhi** (71.7%)
- **Dinuba** (84.4%)
- **East Rancho Dominguez (East Compton)** (82.0%)
- **Fillmore** (74.7%)
- **Garden Acres** (68.9%)
- **Glen Avon** (Jurupa Valley) (68.2%)
- **Greenfield** (91.3%)
- **Hawaiian Gardens** (77.2%)
- **Home Gardens** (73.7%)
- **Imperial** (74.8%)
- **Kerman** (65.0%)
- **King City** (87.5%)
- Lake Los Angeles (53.6%)
- **Lamont** (94.5%)
- **La Quinta** (est. 50%)
- **Lennox** (93.0%)
- **Lindsay** (85.5%)
- **Livingston** (73.1%)
- **Mead Valley** (72.4%)
- **Mendota** (96.6%)
- **McFarland** (91.5%)
- **Mira Loma** (Jurupa Valley) (67.7%)
- **Muscoy** (82.9%)
- Newman (61.6%)
- **North Fair Oaks** (73.1%)
- **Parlier** (97.5%)
- **Patterson** (58.6%)
- Pedley (Jurupa Valley) (53.4%)
- Port Hueneme (52.3%)
- **Reedley** (76.3%)
- Riverbank (52.1%)
- **San Fernando** (92.5%)
- **Sanger** (80.5%)
- **Santa Fe Springs** (81.0%)
- **Selma** (77.6%)
- **Shafter** (80.3%)
- **South El Monte** (84.9%)
- **South San Jose Hills** (86.2%)
- **Sun Village** (63.2%)
- **Valinda** (78.8%)
- **Vincent** (74.9%)
- **Walnut Park** (97.4%)
- **West Puente Valley** (85.5%)
- **Winton** (71.3%)

== Places with between 5,000 and 10,000 people ==
- **Alondra Park** (50.1%)
- **August** (70.3%)
- **Bret Harte** (82.9%)
- **Calipatria** (64.1%)
- **Castroville** (90.1%)
- Colusa (52.4%)
- **Cutler** (96.6%)
- **Earlimart** (91.4%)
- East Whittier(East La Mirada) (50.3%)
- **East Porterville** (72.9%)
- El Cerrito (Riverside County) (52.1%)
- **El Rio** (86.0%)
- **Farmersville** (83.8%)
- **Firebaugh** (91.2%)
- **Fowler** (66.2%)
- **Good Hope** (79.6%)
- **Gonzales** (88.9%)
- **Guadalupe** (86.2%)
- Gustine (50.2%)
- **Holtville** (81.8%)
- Homeland (52.1%)
- **Huron** (96.6%)
- **Interlaken** (71.9%)
- **Keyes** (57.7%)
- **Linnell Camp** (98.0%)
- **Madera Acres** (65.3%)
- **Mecca** (98.7%)
- North Palm Springs (est. 50%)
- Nuevo (54.5%)
- **Orange Cove** (92.7%)
- **Oasis (Riverside County)** (97.7%)
- **Orosi** (86.7%)
- **South Monrovia Island** (74.0%)
- **Roseland** (59.7%)
- **Sunnyslope** (Jurupa Valley) (70.4%)
- Thousand Palms (52.5%)
- **West Modesto** (62.1%)
- **Williams** (76.0%)
- Winters (52.4%)
- **Woodlake** (87.7%)

== Places with fewer than 5,000 people ==
- **Acampo** (58.4%)
- **Airport** (63.6%)
- **Allensworth** (92.6%)
- **Alpaugh** (84.5%)
- **Amesti** (65.4%)
- **Arbuckle** (69.9%)
- **Armona** (67.0%)
- Avalon (55.8%)
- **Baker** (68.3%)
- Ballico (51.7%)
- **Bear Creek (Merced County)** (58.6%)
- **Biola** (73.7%)
- Boonville (50.2%)
- **Boronda** (85.2%)
- **Buena Vista (Santa Clara County)** (65.9%)
- Burbank (Santa Clara County) (50.9%)
- **Buttonwillow** (78.4%)
- **Bystrom** (76.2%)
- **Calwa** (90.1%)
- **Cantua Creek** (98.9%)
- **Caruthers** (63.7%)
- **Cherokee Strip** (82.4%)
- **Chualar** (96.7%)
- Coronita (51.7%)
- Courtland (56.3%)
- Cowan (50.6%)
- **Crestmore Heights** (68.5%)
- **Crows Landing** (69.9%)
- **Cuyama** (70.2%)
- **Del Rey** (93.6%)
- **Delft Colony** (94.3%)
- **Desert Shores** (76.8%)
- Desert View Highlands (53.1%)
- Dos Palos (62.1%)
- Dos Palos Y (61.0%)
- **Ducor** (82.0%)
- **East Orosi** (94.1%)
- East Tulare Villa (55.0%)
- **Easton** (62.8%)
- **Edmundson Acres** (80.6%)
- **El Nido** (74.2%)
- **El Rancho** (94.4%)
- **Empire** (54.3%)
- **Fairmead** (68.0%)
- Franklin, San Joaquin County, California (52.9%)
- **Freedom** (70.7%)
- **French Camp** (51.8%)
- **Fuller Acres** (77.5%)
- **Goshen** (82.6%)
- **Grayson** (86.0%)
- Greenfield (Kern County) (56.7%)
- Grimes (66.0%)
- **Hamilton City** (84.7%)
- **Hardwick** (62.3%)
- **Heber** (98.2%)
- **Highgrove** (65.3%)
- **Home Garden** (67.5%)
- **Hood** (50.6%)
- **Indio Hills** (67.6%)
- Industry (52.5%)
- **Irwindale** (90.6%)
- **Ivanhoe** (83.5%)
- **Kennedy** (77.2%)
- **Kettleman City** (96.1%)
- Kings Beach (55.7%)
- **Knights Landings** (64.7%)
- **Lakeview** (64.2%)
- **Lanare** (88.1%)
- **La Vina** (95.0%)
- **Las Lomas** (89.2%)
- **Laton** (76.4%)
- **Le Grand** (81.8%)
- Littlerock (54.1%)
- **London** (92.9%)
- **Lost Hills** (97.6%)
- **Macdoel** (58.6%)
- **Madison** (76.3%)
- **Malaga** (94.1%)
- **Matheny** (73.4%)
- Maxwell (51.7%)
- **Mayfair (Fresno County)** (65.6%)
- Meadowbrook (55.4%)
- **Mesa Verde** (69.9%)
- **Mettler** (80.1%)
- **Mexican Colony** (80.8%)
- **Montalvin Manor** (62.6%)
- **Monmouth** (70.4%)
- **Monson** (78.2)
- **Monterey Park Tract** (84.2%)
- Mountain View Acres (52.6%)
- **Newell** (60.4%)
- **Niland** (61.4%)
- **North Richmond** (50.1%)
- **North Shore** (95.3%)
- **Oakville** (63.4%)
- **Pajaro** (94.1%)
- **Parklawn** (81.5%)
- **Parksdale** (86.9%)
- **Parkwood** (78.7%)
- **Patterson Tract**(64.7%)
- **Pescadero** (62.5%)
- **Philo** (58.5%)
- Pine Canyon (54.0%)
- **Piru** (84.7%)
- **Pixley** (80.8%)
- **Plainview** (91.5%)
- **Planada** (94.8%)
- **Poplar-Cotton Center** (73.2%)
- **Potrero** (76.1%)
- **Raisin City** (81.1%)
- **Richgrove** (93.9%)
- **Ripley** (77.6%)
- **Riverdale Park** (62.1%)
- **Riverdale** (66.8%)
- Robbins (56.0%)
- **Rodriguez Camp** (96.8%)
- **Rollingwood** (61.8%)
- Romoland (51.4%)
- **Rose Hills** (58.8%)
- **Rouse** (63.8%)
- **Salton City** (62.9%)
- Salton Sea Beach (54.3%)
- **San Ardo** (70.2%)
- **San Joaquin** (95.6%)
- **San Lucas** (83.3%)
- San Miguel (San Luis Obispo County) (51.2%)
- San Simeon (55.8%)
- **Santa Nella** (70.1%)
- **Saticoy** (87.0%)
- **Seeley** (85.6%)
- **Seven Trees** (68.0%)
- **Seville** (95.4%)
- **Shackelford** (79.7%)
- Shandon (53.5%)
- **Smith Corner** (84.0%)
- **South Dos Palos** (77.9%)
- **Stratford** (83.7%)
- **Strathmore** (79.4%)
- **Sultana** (89.7%)
- **Sunol-Midtown** (64.3%)
- **Taft Mosswood** (71.8%)
- **Terra Bella** (87.4%)
- **Teviston** (85.6%)
- **Thornton** (68.1%)
- **Thermal** (95.3%)
- **Three Rocks** (95.5%)
- **Tipton** (84.4%)
- **Tooleville** (82.3%)
- **Tonyville** (90.5%)
- **Tranquillity** (79.7%)
- **Traver** (77.3%)
- **Tulelake** (59.5%)
- **Val Verde** (61.1%)
- **Vista Santa Rosa** (85.0%)
- Victor (51.2%)
- Volta (53.7%)
- **Weedpatch** (93.5%)
- **Westley** (96.0%)
- **Westmorland** (87.1%)
- **West Goshen** (70.1%)
- West Indio (unincorporated Indio (70%)
- **West Park** (76.0%)
- **Winterhaven** (66.2%)
- **Woodville** (88.8%)
- **Yettem** (94.3%)
- **Yolo** (65.1%)

== See also ==
- List of U.S. communities with Hispanic-majority populations in the 2010 census
- List of Texas communities with Hispanic majority populations in the 2000 census
- List of U.S. counties with Hispanic- or Latino-majority populations
