= Metropolitan Fresno =

Metropolitan Fresno Greater Fresno
- Combined Statistical Area
- Fresno–Hanford–Corcoran, CA CSA
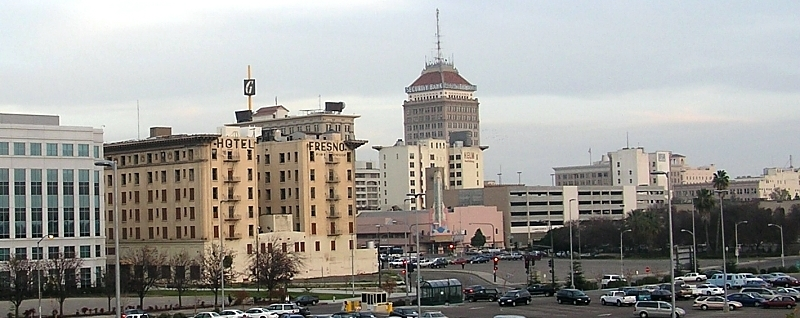
- Downtown Fresno skyline
Map of Fresno–Hanford–Corcoran, CA CSA
Fresno, CA MSA
Hanford–Corcoran, CA MSA
City of Fresno
City of Madera
City of Hanford
City of Corcoran
- Coordinates: 37°N 120°W
- Country: United States
- State: California
- Largest city: Fresno
- Other cities: Clovis; Madera; Chowchilla; Hanford; Corcoran

Area
  - Total: 8,099 sq mi (20,980 km^{2})
- Highest elevation: 14,249 ft (4,343 m)
- Lowest elevation: 180.0 ft (54.86 m)

Population
  - Total: 1,171,617 (2020 census)
  - Rank: 49th in the U.S.
  - Density: 164.4/sq mi (63.49/km^{2})

GDP
  - Total: $60.151 billion (2023)
- Time zone: UTC-8 (PST)
  - Summer (DST): UTC-7 (PDT)

Metropolitan Fresno, officially Fresno–Hanford–Corcoran, CA CSA, is a metropolitan area in the San Joaquin Valley, in the United States, consisting of Fresno and Madera counties. It is the third-largest metropolitan region in Northern California, behind the San Francisco Bay Area and Greater Sacramento. It is also the 49th-largest CSA in the U.S. as of 2010 census.

Metropolitan Fresno is anchored by Fresno, the fifth-largest city in California and the 34th-largest in the United States. The metropolitan area is located in the Central Valley, which is one of the world's most productive agricultural regions. It has a large agricultural economy despite being increasingly urbanized. In more recent years, statewide droughts in California have further strained both the Fresno metropolitan area's and the entire Central Valley's water security.

== Counties ==
County	Seat	2025 estimate	2020 Census	Change	Area	Density
Fresno	Fresno	1,035,456	1,008,654	+2.66%	6,011 sq mi (15,570 km^{2})	172/sq mi (67/km^{2})
Madera	Madera	167,927	156,255	+7.47%	2,153 sq mi (5,580 km^{2})	78/sq mi (30/km^{2})
Total		1,203,383	1,164,909	+3.30%	8,164 sq mi (21,140 km^{2})	147/sq mi (57/km^{2})

== Overview ==
Metropolitan Fresno, unlike the other metropolitan regions of California, is still largely agricultural, contains a large rural land area and is centered in the San Joaquin Valley. The metropolitan area is located between the larger metropolitan areas of California, bordering the southernmost boundaries of the San Francisco Bay Area in the west and separated from the Greater Sacramento and Greater Los Angeles Areas to the north and south respectively by long distances of rural areas and farmland. Additionally, the lifestyle and culture of Metropolitan Fresno does not reflect the San Francisco or Sacramento influence as other areas have in Northern California due to distance from the state capital and bordering an unpopulated area of the outskirts of the Bay Area. Instead, Metropolitan Fresno is more influenced by the interior valley region of California although as the area becomes more urbanized, it has become slightly more influenced by the other metropolitan areas of Northern California, particularly the Bay Area.

Fresno is the largest city in the area and in the Central Valley. Along with Sacramento, it is the economic center of California's interior and is one of the fastest-growing cities in the United States, with the region having a growth of over 20% since 2000. Fresno is a major transportation hub for visitors heading to Yosemite, Kings Canyon and Sequoia National Parks, which are 60 mi (97 km) and 75 mi (121 km) away from Fresno respectively with Fresno being the nearest major city from the parks. The United States Military has a heavy presence in the Fresno area and numerous divisions are based in Metropolitan Fresno, including the 40th Aviation Brigade and 144th Fighter Wing. Fresno County is the largest agricultural county and has the largest concentration of agriculture of any county in the United States.

Madera County is primarily an agricultural county as well, but its cities serve as suburbs of Fresno. Since 2010, statewide droughts in California have further strained both the Fresno metropolitan area's and the entire Central Valley's water security.

== Geography and climate ==
=== Geography ===
Metropolitan Fresno is primarily located in the San Joaquin Valley, which in turn is a part of the larger Central Valley region of California, one of the world's most important agricultural areas. The eastern portions of the area border the Sierra Nevada mountains and the western portions border the Coast Ranges, thus giving the edges of the area higher elevations than the inner valley areas. Several waterways traverse the region, including the San Joaquin and Kings rivers, the Delta-Mendota and Madera canals, and the California Aqueduct, providing water to crops. The California Aqueduct is one of the world's longest artificial aqueducts.

=== Climate ===
Metropolitan Fresno has a Mediterranean climate (Köppen Csa) with some semi-arid factors due to its interior location (Köppen Bsh), with mild, moderately wet winters and hot and dry summers. December is the coolest month, with an average of 53.4 °F (11.9 °C) during the day in downtown Fresno while summer temperatures can reach 110 °F (43.3 °C) or more. Thick tule fog is present in the valley areas during the winter. Rainfall is most common between December and April while snowfall is sometimes experienced in the higher mountain elevations.

== Cities ==
County seat

City	County	Population (January 1, 2010)	Land area
Chowchilla	Madera	18,698	7.1 sq mi (18 km^{2})
Clovis	Fresno	97,218	22.03 sq mi (57.1 km^{2})
Coalinga	Fresno	19,065	5.9 sq mi (15 km^{2})
Firebaugh	Fresno	6,941	2.8 sq mi (7.3 km^{2})
Fowler	Fresno	5,764	2 sq mi (5.2 km^{2})
Fresno	Fresno	502,303	104.4 sq mi (270 km^{2})
Huron	Fresno	8,062	1.3 sq mi (3.4 km^{2})
Kerman	Fresno	14,381	2.2 sq mi (5.7 km^{2})
Kingsburg	Fresno	11,504	2.3 sq mi (6.0 km^{2})
Madera	Madera	58,243	12.3 sq mi (32 km^{2})
Mendota	Fresno	9,966	1.9 sq mi (4.9 km^{2})
Orange Cove	Fresno	11,089	1.5 sq mi (3.9 km^{2})
Parlier	Fresno	13,658	1.6 sq mi (4.1 km^{2})
Reedley	Fresno	26,227	4.4 sq mi (11 km^{2})
Sanger	Fresno	25,664	4.7 sq mi (12 km^{2})
San Joaquin	Fresno	4,071	1 sq mi (2.6 km^{2})
Selma	Fresno	23,435	4.3 sq mi (11 km^{2})

== Census-designated places ==
- Auberry
- Biola
- Bonadelle Ranchos-Madera Ranchos
- Bowles
- Calwa
- Cantua Creek
- Caruthers
- Del Rey
- Easton
- Friant
- Lanare

- Laton
- Madera Acres
- Oakhurst
- Parksdale
- Parkwood
- Raisin City
- Riverdale
- Shaver Lake
- Squaw Valley
- Tranquillity
- Yosemite Lakes

== Transportation ==
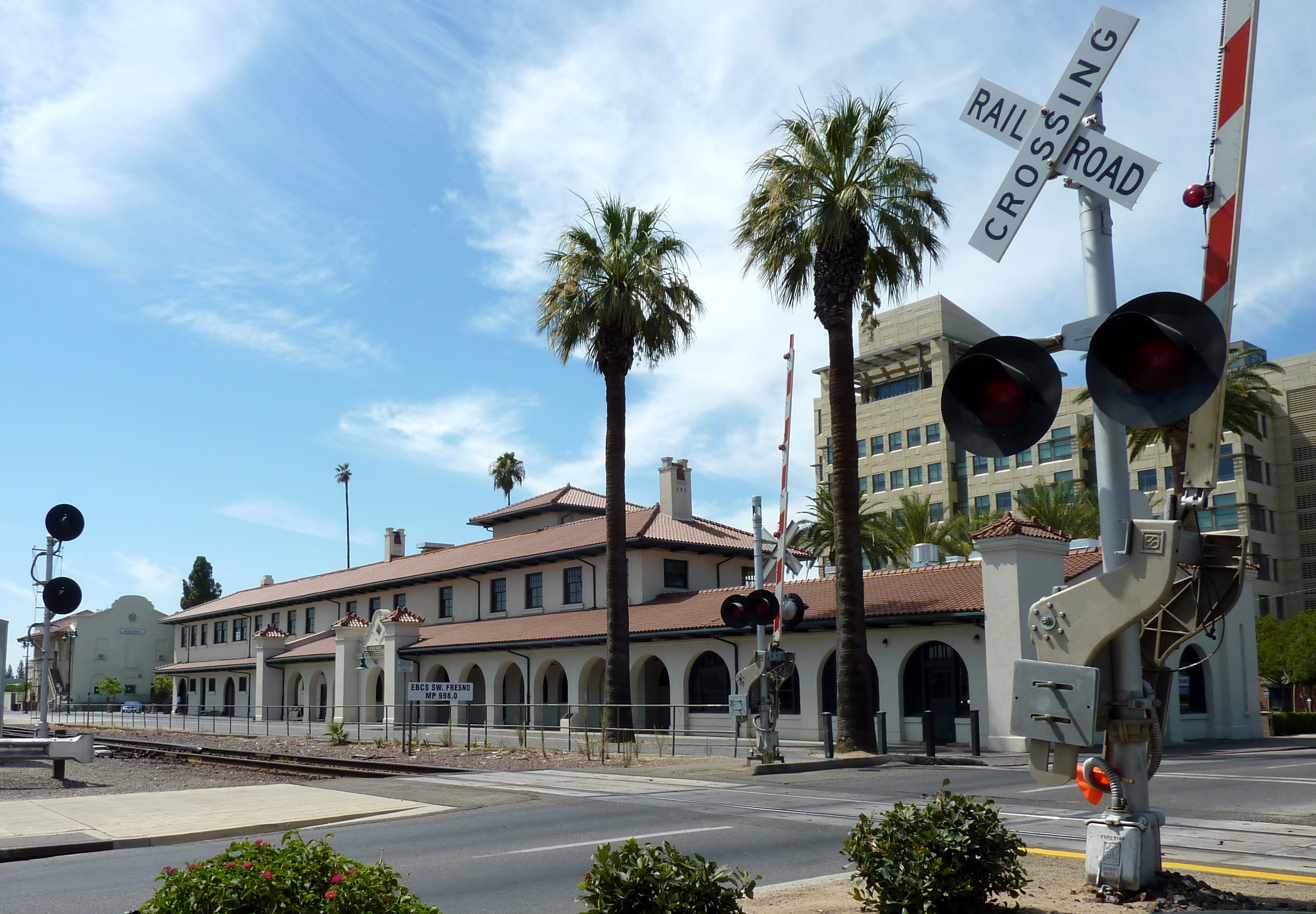
The Santa Fe Passenger Depot is the largest train station in Metropolitan Fresno.

Owing to its gateway location to numerous national parks as well as being in between the larger Greater Los Angeles and San Francisco Bay Area and Greater Sacramento regions, Metropolitan Fresno serves as a transportation hub in the California interior. However, unlike the larger metropolitan areas of California, Metropolitan Fresno does not have a large public transit system but is served by numerous freeways and highways.

=== Highways and freeways ===
Metropolitan Fresno is served by a large number of highways and freeways that are vital in linking the rest of Northern California with Southern California and its location in between the three larger metropolitan areas of the state allows for a large trucking industry as well as services to travelers. Highways and freeways in Metropolitan Fresno include:

- Interstate 5
- State Route 33
- State Route 41
- State Route 43
- State Route 49
- State Route 63
- State Route 99

- State Route 145
- State Route 152
- State Route 168
- State Route 180
- State Route 198
- State Route 201
- State Route 269

=== Air ===
The Fresno Yosemite International Airport is the only commercial airport in the region and is the major gateway into Yosemite National Park, Sequoia National Park, and Kings Canyon National Park. Additionally, there are several general aviation airports in the area, including Fresno Chandler Executive Airport, Firebaugh Airport, Sierra Sky Park Airport and Madera Municipal Airport.

=== Public transit ===
Metropolitan Fresno's central California location allows it to be a large rail transport center. Two Amtrak rail stations are located in the area, Santa Fe Passenger Depot and Madera which are on the Gold Runner line. Fresno Area Express and Madera County Express serve as bus transit lines connecting to downtown Fresno. Greyhound and Orange Belt Stages provide long-distance bus travel to the area. California High Speed Rail, a currently under-construction high speed rail line, will connect Los Angeles and San Francisco via a station in Fresno and Madera.

== Politics ==
Metropolitan Fresno vote by party in presidential elections
Year	GOP	DEM	Others
2024	52.08% 198,268	45.34% 172,609	2.58% 9,804
2020	46.30% 193,842	51.64% 216,193	2.06% 8,614
2016	44.59% 147,406	47.91% 158,370	7.50% 24,793
2012	49.17% 147,342	48.44% 145,147	2.38% 7,141
2008	48.93% 154,598	48.95% 154,658	2.11% 6,670
2004	58.28% 166,859	40.74% 116,635	0.98% 2,819
2000	54.13% 137,625	41.97% 106,709	3.89% 9,896
1996	48.24% 115,323	44.22% 105,702	7.54% 18,030
1992	40.98% 102,203	41.41% 103,281	17.61% 43,922
1988	50.47% 108,090	48.23% 103,277	1.30% 2,784
1984	54.91% 118,711	44.09% 95,309	1.00% 2,157

Unlike the other metropolitan areas of California, Metropolitan Fresno has historically been a strong Republican stronghold and the region reflects the Coastal California and interior California divide in which coastal areas and urbanized areas of California tend to lean Democratic while interior areas tend to lean Republican. Exceptions to this are Orange County in Greater Los Angeles, which has been a Republican stronghold since the 1940s, and most of Greater Sacramento, which is a politically competitive area where the major parties are often divided in pluralities although recently there have been Democratic majorities. Metropolitan Fresno has begun to become a politically competitive region as well, as in the 2008 presidential election, the region was split with Fresno County going for Barack Obama with the majority of the votes, while John McCain carried Madera County with a comfortable margin. Locally, Democratic concentrations are found in much of Fresno and most non-agricultural suburbs while Republican concentrations are found in Madera County and most rural towns.
