= South Modesto =

South Modesto is the area south of the Tuolumne River, in Modesto, California, United States. The region consists of the census-designated places of Bret Harte, Shackelford, and Bystrom; as well as the county "islands" amidst them. The area is highly influenced by its residents of Mexican descent, hence the supermarkets, businesses, and nickname "Little Mexico". With the remodel of the regionally known flea market "El Rematito", South Modesto has attracted more residents from other towns.

== History ==
In 1917, the city of Modesto built a two lane bridge connecting the city on the north bank to the then undeveloped south bank of the Tuolumne River. This was done to create a road link to areas south of the river (particularly Ceres) and for development south of the river.

In 1918, the Modesto Tallow Company opened along a then-lonely Crows Landing Road. The company was a rendering plant that processed dead animal carcasses and fleshy leftovers (meats, fats, bones) from area restaurants and butchers to make tallow, an important ingredient in animal feed, toothpaste, soap, and glue, among other household products. Since then, the plant has ceased operation and has been torn down.
