= Q49 =

Q49 may refer to:

- Q49 (New York City bus)
- Al-Hujurat, the 49th surah of the Quran
- Firebaugh Airport, in Fresno County, California, United States
