= Cherokee Strip (disambiguation) =

Cherokee Outlet often referred to as the Cherokee Strip, is in what is now the state of Oklahoma.

Cherokee Strip may also refer to:

- Cherokee Strip (Kansas), a disputed strip of land on the southern border of Kansas
- Cherokee Strip, California, a census-designated place in Kern County, California
- The Cherokee Strip, a 1937 American western film
- Cherokee Strip (film), a 1940 American Western
