= Shackelford, California =

Shackelford
- Neighbourhood
- Nickname: Little Mexico
- Location in Stanislaus County and the state of California

- Location in the United States
- Coordinates: 37°36′54″N 120°59′27″W
- Country: United States
- State: California
- County: Stanislaus
- City: Modesto

Area
  - Total: 0.681 sq mi (1.765 km^{2})
  - Land: 0.671 sq mi (1.739 km^{2})
  - Water: 0.010 sq mi (0.026 km^{2}) 1.47%
- Elevation: 85 ft (26 m)

Population (2010)
  - Total: 3,371
  - Density: 5,021/sq mi (1,938/km^{2})
- Time zone: UTC-8 (Pacific (PST))
  - Summer (DST): UTC-7 (PDT)
- ZIP code: 95351
- Area code: 209
- FIPS code: 06-71084
- GNIS feature ID: 1853416

Shackelford is a southern neighbourhood of the city of Modesto in Stanislaus County, California, United States, which was officially annexed on June 1, 2012. The population was 3,371 at the 2010 census, down from 5,170 at the 2000 census. It is part of the Modesto Metropolitan Statistical Area. Prior to its annexation, the neighbourhood was a census-designated place (CDP).

== History ==
In 1916, the Lion Bridge which was built over the Tuolumne River to improve the access between the cities of Modesto and Ceres. It was constructed at the cost of $111,000.

The city of Modesto finally annexed the "Shackelford annexation area" in 2012, regarding the event as "the culmination of a multi-year effort". The area is bordered by California State Route 99 on the north, Crows Landing Road on the west, Main Street on the east, and Hatch Road on the south

== Geography ==
Shackelford is located at 37°36′54″N 120°59′27″W (37.615082, -120.990969) in South Modesto. According to the United States Census Bureau, the CDP has a total area of 0.7 square miles (1.8 km^{2}), of which 0.7 square miles (1.8 km^{2}) is land and 1.47% is water.

== Demographics ==
Historical population
Census	Pop.	Note	%±
2000	5,170		—
2010	3,371		−34.8%
U.S. Decennial Census; 1860–1870 1880-1890; 1900 1910 1920; 1930 1940 1950; 1960 1970 1980; 1990 2000 2010

Shackelford first appeared as a census designated place in the 2000 U.S. census. Part of its geography was taken to form the Parklawn CDP prior to the 2020 U.S. census. The remainder was annexed to the city of Modesto in 2012.

=== 2010 ===
The 2010 United States census reported that Shackelford had a population of 3,371. The population density was 4,945.7 inhabitants per square mile (1,909.5/km^{2}). The racial makeup of Shackelford was 1,560 (46.3%) White, 27 (0.8%) African American, 63 (1.9%) Native American, 59 (1.8%) Asian, 1 (0.0%) Pacific Islander, 1,496 (44.4%) from other races, and 165 (4.9%) from two or more races. Hispanic or Latino of any race were 2,685 persons (79.6%).

The Census reported that 3,371 people (100% of the population) lived in households, 0 (0%) lived in non-institutionalized group quarters, and 0 (0%) were institutionalized.

There were 898 households, out of which 499 (55.6%) had children under the age of 18 living in them, 376 (41.9%) were opposite-sex married couples living together, 215 (23.9%) had a female householder with no husband present, 112 (12.5%) had a male householder with no wife present. There were 119 (13.3%) unmarried opposite-sex partnerships, and 8 (0.9%) same-sex married couples or partnerships. 139 households (15.5%) were made up of individuals, and 46 (5.1%) had someone living alone who was 65 years of age or older. The average household size was 3.75. There were 703 families (78.3% of all households); the average family size was 4.06.

The population was spread out, with 1,175 people (34.9%) under the age of 18, 363 people (10.8%) aged 18 to 24, 1,002 people (29.7%) aged 25 to 44, 611 people (18.1%) aged 45 to 64, and 220 people (6.5%) who were 65 years of age or older. The median age was 27.4 years. For every 100 females, there were 103.9 males. For every 100 females age 18 and over, there were 105.0 males.

There were 1,059 housing units at an average density of 1,553.7 per square mile (599.9/km^{2}), of which 336 (37.4%) were owner-occupied, and 562 (62.6%) were occupied by renters. The homeowner vacancy rate was 2.0%; the rental vacancy rate was 13.4%. 1,299 people (38.5% of the population) lived in owner-occupied housing units and 2,072 people (61.5%) lived in rental housing units.

=== 2000 ===
As of the census of 2000, there were 5,170 people, 1,363 households, and 1,053 families residing in the CDP. The population density was 6,106.4 inhabitants per square mile (2,357.7/km^{2}). There were 1,454 housing units at an average density of 1,717.3 per square mile (663.1/km^{2}). The racial makeup of the CDP was 50.14% White, 1.41% African American, 2.13% Native American, 0.95% Asian, 0.14% Pacific Islander, 38.63% from other races, and 6.62% from two or more races. Hispanic or Latino of any race were 68.12% of the population.

There were 1,363 households, out of which 49.5% had children under the age of 18 living with them, 49.3% were married couples living together, 18.0% had a female householder with no husband present, and 22.7% were non-families. 15.1% of all households were made up of individuals, and 5.8% had someone living alone who was 65 years of age or older. The average household size was 3.79 and the average family size was 4.25.

In the CDP, the population was spread out, with 37.6% under the age of 18, 11.6% from 18 to 24, 28.4% from 25 to 44, 15.4% from 45 to 64, and 7.0% who were 65 years of age or older. The median age was 26 years. For every 100 females, there were 108.8 males. For every 100 females age 18 and over, there were 104.8 males.

The median income for a household in the CDP was $23,289, and the median income for a family was $24,541. Males had a median income of $23,365 versus $15,903 for females. The per capita income for the CDP was $7,250. About 33.6% of families and 36.1% of the population were below the poverty line, including 39.1% of those under age 18 and 13.9% of those age 65 or over.

== Politics ==
In the state legislature Shackelford is located is in the 4th senatorial district, represented by Republican Marie Alvarado-Gil, and in the 22nd Assembly district, represented by Republican Juan Alanis.

In the United States House of Representatives, Shackelford is in California's 13th congressional district, represented by Democrat Adam Gray.
