= Seventh Street Bridge =

Seventh Street Bridge may refer to:

- Lion Bridge, Modesto, California
- Andy Warhol Bridge, Pittsburgh, Pennsylvania
