= Lions Bridge =

Lions Bridge may refer to one:

- Lions Gate Bridge, a suspension bridge in Vancouver, Canada
- Lions' Bridge, Sofia (Lavov most), a bridge in Sofia, Bulgaria
- Lion Bridge, a bridge in Modesto, California
- Bridge of Four Lions (Lviny most), a footbridge in Saint Petersburg, Russia
- Bridge of Lions, a bascule bridge in St. Augustine, Florida, United States
- Chain Bridge (Budapest), a suspension bridge in Budapest, Hungary
- Lions Bridge, Franklin, Ohio, United States
- Lions Bridge, a former railway bridge in Arles, France
