= F34 =

F34, F-34 or F.34 may refer to:

- F-34 tank gun, a gun used in the Soviet T-34 tank of World War II
- INS Himgiri (F34), a Nilgiri-class frigate of the Indian Navy decommissioned in 2005
- HMS Jaguar (F34), a United Kingdom Royal Navy destroyer which saw service during World War II
- HMS Puma (F34), a United Kingdom Royal Navy anti-aircraft frigate which saw service during the 1950s
- BMW 3 Series Gran Turismo (F34)
- Firebaugh Airport (FAA LID F34)
- F-34, JP-8 jet fuel NATO designation
- Persistent mood (affective) disorders ICD-10 code
