= California's 13th congressional district =

U.S. House district for California

Coordinates: 37.8°N 122.25°W

- Interactive map of district boundaries
- Representative: Adam Gray; D–Merced
- Population (2025): 799,059
- Median household income: $72,960
- Ethnicity: 65.9% Hispanic; 22.5% White; 6.2% Asian; 2.8% Black; 2.5% Two or more races; 1.2% other
- Cook PVI: R+1

California's 13th congressional district is a congressional district in the U.S. state of California. Adam Gray, a Democrat, has represented this district since January 2025.

The 13th district is located in the San Joaquin Valley, comprising all of Merced County; most of the population of Madera County; and parts of Stanislaus, Fresno, and San Joaquin counties. Cities in the district include Merced, Madera, Ceres, Patterson, Lathrop, Chowchilla, Atwater, Coalinga, and Mendota; as well as the southern parts of both Modesto and Turlock. The 13th is considered a swing district and was one of 13 congressional districts that voted for Donald Trump in the 2024 presidential election while simultaneously electing a Democrat in the 2024 House of Representatives elections.

Prior to the 2022 redistricting, the 13th district contained cities in the northwestern portion of Alameda County including Alameda, Albany, Berkeley, Emeryville, Oakland, Piedmont, and San Leandro. This area is now covered by the 12th district.

== Recent election results from statewide races ==
=== 2023–2027 boundaries ===
Year	Office	Results
2008	President	Obama 54% - 45%
2010	Governor	Whitman 47.0% - 46.5%
2010	Lt. Governor	Maldonado 51% - 39%
2010	Secretary of State	Bowen 46% - 45%
2010	Attorney General	Cooley 50% - 41%
2010	Treasurer	Lockyer 51% - 41%
2010	Controller	Chiang 52% - 40%
2012	President	Obama 55% - 45%
2014	Governor	Brown 51% - 49%
2016	President	Clinton 53% - 41%
2018	Governor	Newsom 52% - 48%
2018	Attorney General	Becerra 55% - 45%
2020	President	Biden 54% - 43%
2022	Senate (Reg.)	Meuser 51% - 49%
2022	Governor	Dahle 54% - 46%
2022	Lt. Governor	Underwood Jacobs 53% - 47%
2022	Secretary of State	Bernosky 52% - 48%
2022	Attorney General	Hochman 53% - 47%
2022	Treasurer	Guerrero 53% - 47%
2022	Controller	Chen 55% - 45%
2024	President	Trump 51% - 46%
2024	Senate (Reg.)	Garvey 52% - 48%

== Composition ==
FIPS County Code	County	Seat	Population
19	Fresno	Fresno	1,017,162
39	Madera	Madera	162,858
47	Merced	Merced	291,920
77	San Joaquin	Stockton	800,965
99	Stanislaus	Modesto	551,430

Due to the 2020 redistricting, California's 13th congressional district has been moved geographically to the San Joaquin Valley. It encompasses Merced County, and parts of San Joaquin, Stanislaus, Madera, and Fresno Counties. The area in San Joaquin County includes the city of Lathrop. The area in Stanislaus County includes the southern halves of the cities of Modesto and Turlock; the cities of Ceres, Patterson, and Newman; and the census-designated places Empire, Airport, Rouse, Bystrom, Parklawn, Bret Harte, Riverdale Park, West Modesto, Keyes, Cowan, Monterey Park Tract, Grayson, Westley, Crows Landing, and Diablo Grande. The area in Madera County includes the cities of Chowchilla and Madera and the census-designated places Fairmead, Madera Acres, Parksdale, Parkwood, La Vina, Bonadelle Ranchos, and Madera Ranchos. The area in Fresno County includes the cities of Coalinga, Mendota, Kerman, Firebaugh, San Joaquin, and Huron; and the census-designated places Biola, Raisin City, Caruthers, Laton, Riverdale, Lanare, Tranquillity, Three Rocks, Cantua Creek, and Westside.

San Joaquin County is split between this district and the 9th district. They are partitioned by Union Pacific, Highway 380, S Tracy Blvd, the California Aqueduct, S Banta Rd, Highway 5, Paradise Cut, S Manthey Rd, Walthall Slough, E West Ripon Rd, Kincaid Rd, Hutchinson Rd, and Stanislaus River.

Stanislaus County is split between this district and the 5th district. They are partitioned by S Golden State Blvd, Highway J14, Union Pacific, Highway 99, N Golden State Blvd, Faith Home Rd, Rohde Rd, Moore Rd, Tuolumne River, Burlington Northern Santa Fe, Lateral No 2 Park, Viola St, Roble Ave, N Conejo Ave, N Carpenter Rd, Kansas Ave, Morse Rd, and Stanislaus River.

Madera County is split between this district and the 5th district. They are partitioned by Road 35, Road 36, Road 38, Madera Equalization Reservoir, River Rd, Avenue 21, Road 23, Avenue 27, Road 22 1/2, and Berenda Slough.

Fresno County is split between this district and the 21st district. They are partitioned by N Dickenson Ave, Highway 180, S Garfield Ave, W California Ave, S Grantland Ave, W Jensen Ave, S Chateau Fresno Ave, W North Ave, W American Ave, S Westlawn Ave, W Lincoln Ave, Shayes Ave, W Sumner Ave, S Cornelia Ave, W South Ave, S East Ave, E Mountain View Ave, S Sunnyside Ave, E Clemenceau Ave, S Fowler Ave, E Elkhorn Ave.

=== Cities and CDPs of 10,000 or more people ===
- Modesto – 218,464
- Merced – 86,333
- Turlock – 72,740
- Madera – 66,224
- Ceres – 49,302
- Los Banos – 45,532
- Atwater – 31,970
- Lathrop – 28,701
- Patterson – 23,781
- Chowchilla – 19,039
- Coalinga – 17,590
- Kerman – 16,016
- Mendota – 15,595
- Livingston – 14,172
- Newman – 12,351
- Winton – 11,709
- Delhi – 10,656

=== 2,500 – 10,000 people ===
- Madera Acres – 9,162
- Firebaugh – 8,096
- Franklin – 6,919
- Huron – 6,206
- Gustine – 6,110
- West Modesto – 5,965
- Dos Palos – 5,798
- Keyes – 5,672
- Bonadelle Ranchos – 5,497
- Hilmar-Irwin – 5,164
- Bret Harte – 5,135
- McSwain – 4,480
- Empire – 4,202
- Planada – 4,164
- Bystrom – 3,957
- San Joaquin – 3,701
- Madera Ranchos – 3,623
- Riverdale – 3,477
- Parksdale – 3,234
- Caruthers – 2,613

== Future composition ==
Beginning with the 2026 election, the 13th district will consist of the following counties:

- Fresno (part)
- Madera (part)
- Merced
- San Joaquin (part)
- Stanislaus (part)

== List of members representing the district ==
Member	Party	Dates	Cong ress	Electoral history	Counties
District created March 4, 1933
Charles Kramer (Los Angeles)	Democratic	March 4, 1933 – January 3, 1943	73rd 74th 75th 76th 77th	Elected in 1932. Re-elected in 1934. Re-elected in 1936. Re-elected in 1938. Re-elected in 1940. Lost re-election.	1933–1943 [data missing]
Norris Poulson (Los Angeles)	Republican	January 3, 1943 – January 3, 1945	78th	Elected in 1942. Lost re-election.	1943–1953 [data missing]
Ned R. Healy (Los Angeles)	Democratic	January 3, 1945 – January 3, 1947	79th	Elected in 1944. Lost re-election.	1943–1953 [data missing]
Norris Poulson (Los Angeles)	Republican	January 3, 1947 – January 3, 1953	80th 81st 82nd	Elected again in 1946. Re-elected in 1948. Re-elected in 1950. Redistricted to the 24th district.	1943–1953 [data missing]
Ernest K. Bramblett (Pacific Grove)	Republican	January 3, 1953 – January 3, 1955	83rd	Redistricted from the 11th district and re-elected in 1952. Retired.	1953–1963; Monterey, San Luis Obispo, Santa Barbara, Ventura
Charles M. Teague (Santa Paula)	Republican	January 3, 1955 – January 1, 1974	84th 85th 86th 87th 88th 89th 90th 91st 92nd 93rd	Elected in 1954. Re-elected in 1956. Re-elected in 1958. Re-elected in 1960. Re-elected in 1962. Re-elected in 1964. Re-elected in 1966. Re-elected in 1968. Re-elected in 1970. Re-elected in 1972. Died.	1953–1963; Monterey, San Luis Obispo, Santa Barbara, Ventura
Charles M. Teague (Santa Paula)	Republican	January 3, 1955 – January 1, 1974	84th 85th 86th 87th 88th 89th 90th 91st 92nd 93rd	Elected in 1954. Re-elected in 1956. Re-elected in 1958. Re-elected in 1960. Re-elected in 1962. Re-elected in 1964. Re-elected in 1966. Re-elected in 1968. Re-elected in 1970. Re-elected in 1972. Died.	1963–1967; Santa Barbara, Ventura
Charles M. Teague (Santa Paula)	Republican	January 3, 1955 – January 1, 1974	84th 85th 86th 87th 88th 89th 90th 91st 92nd 93rd	Elected in 1954. Re-elected in 1956. Re-elected in 1958. Re-elected in 1960. Re-elected in 1962. Re-elected in 1964. Re-elected in 1966. Re-elected in 1968. Re-elected in 1970. Re-elected in 1972. Died.	1967–1973; Southwestern Los Angeles, Santa Barbara, Ventura
Charles M. Teague (Santa Paula)	Republican	January 3, 1955 – January 1, 1974	84th 85th 86th 87th 88th 89th 90th 91st 92nd 93rd	Elected in 1954. Re-elected in 1956. Re-elected in 1958. Re-elected in 1960. Re-elected in 1962. Re-elected in 1964. Re-elected in 1966. Re-elected in 1968. Re-elected in 1970. Re-elected in 1972. Died.	1973–1975; Most of Santa Barbara and Ventura
Vacant		January 1, 1974 – March 5, 1974	93rd		1973–1975; Most of Santa Barbara and Ventura
Robert J. Lagomarsino (Ojai)	Republican	March 5, 1974 – January 3, 1975	93rd	Elected to finish Teague's term. Redistricted to the 19th district.	1973–1975; Most of Santa Barbara and Ventura
Norman Mineta (San Jose)	Democratic	January 3, 1975 – January 3, 1993	94th 95th 96th 97th 98th 99th 100th 101st 102nd	Elected in 1974. Re-elected in 1976. Re-elected in 1978. Re-elected in 1980. Re-elected in 1982. Re-elected in 1984. Re-elected in 1986. Re-elected in 1988. Re-elected in 1990. Redistricted to the 15th district.	1975–1983; Santa Clara
Norman Mineta (San Jose)	Democratic	January 3, 1975 – January 3, 1993	94th 95th 96th 97th 98th 99th 100th 101st 102nd	Elected in 1974. Re-elected in 1976. Re-elected in 1978. Re-elected in 1980. Re-elected in 1982. Re-elected in 1984. Re-elected in 1986. Re-elected in 1988. Re-elected in 1990. Redistricted to the 15th district.	1983–1993; Santa Clara (western San Jose)
Pete Stark (Fremont)	Democratic	January 3, 1993 – January 3, 2013	103rd 104th 105th 106th 107th 108th 109th 110th 111th 112th	Redistricted from the 9th district and re-elected in 1992. Re-elected in 1994. Re-elected in 1996. Re-elected in 1998. Re-elected in 2000. Re-elected in 2002. Re-elected in 2004. Re-elected in 2006. Re-elected in 2008. Re-elected in 2010. Redistricted to the 15th district and lost re-election.	1993–2003; Western Alameda, small part of northern Santa Clara
Pete Stark (Fremont)	Democratic	January 3, 1993 – January 3, 2013	103rd 104th 105th 106th 107th 108th 109th 110th 111th 112th	Redistricted from the 9th district and re-elected in 1992. Re-elected in 1994. Re-elected in 1996. Re-elected in 1998. Re-elected in 2000. Re-elected in 2002. Re-elected in 2004. Re-elected in 2006. Re-elected in 2008. Re-elected in 2010. Redistricted to the 15th district and lost re-election.	2003–2013 Southwestern Alameda
Barbara Lee (Oakland)	Democratic	January 3, 2013 – January 3, 2023	113th 114th 115th 116th 117th	Redistricted from the 9th district and re-elected in 2012. Re-elected in 2014. Re-elected in 2016. Re-elected in 2018. Re-elected in 2020. Redistricted to the 12th district.	2013–2023 Northern Alameda
John Duarte (Modesto)	Republican	January 3, 2023 – January 3, 2025	118th	Elected in 2022. Lost re-election.	2023–present San Joaquin Valley, all of Merced County; including all of Madera parts of Stanislaus, Fresno, and San Joaquin
Adam Gray (Merced)	Democratic	January 3, 2025 – present	119th	Elected in 2024. Re-elected in 2026.	2023–present San Joaquin Valley, all of Merced County; including all of Madera parts of Stanislaus, Fresno, and San Joaquin

== Election results ==
=== 1932 ===
1932 United States House of Representatives elections in California
Party	Candidate	Votes	%
Democratic	Charles Kramer	65,261	52.7
Republican	Charles H. Randall	53,449	43.1
Liberty	George D. Higgins	5,237	4.2
Total votes		123,947	100.0
Turnout			
Democratic win (new seat)			

=== 1934 ===
1934 United States House of Representatives elections in California
Party	Candidate	Votes	%
Democratic	Charles Kramer (Incumbent)	83,384	62.5
Republican	Thomas K. Case	27,993	21.0
Prohibition	Charles H. Randall	18,760	14.1
Socialist	Michael S. Kerrigan	2,113	1.6
Communist	John J. Graham	1,268	0.9
Total votes		133,518	100.0
Turnout			
Democratic hold			

=== 1936 ===
1936 United States House of Representatives elections in California
Party	Candidate	Votes	%
Democratic	Charles Kramer (Incumbent)	119,251	90.0
No party	Floyd Seaman (write-in)	6,946	5.2
Communist	Emma Cutler	6,362	4.8
Total votes		132,559	100.0
Turnout			
Democratic hold			

=== 1938 ===
1938 United States House of Representatives elections in California
Party	Candidate	Votes	%
Democratic	Charles Kramer (Incumbent)	96,258	65.9
Republican	K. L. Stockton	44,808	30.7
Communist	Louis Baron	5,104	3.4
Total votes		146,170	100.0
Turnout			
Democratic hold			

=== 1940 ===
1940 United States House of Representatives elections in California
Party	Candidate	Votes	%
Democratic	Charles Kramer (Incumbent)	127,167	75.7
Prohibition	Charles H. Randall	36,406	21.7
Communist	Celeste Strack	4,434	2.6
Total votes		168,007	100.0
Turnout			
Democratic hold			

=== 1942 ===
1942 United States House of Representatives elections in California
Party	Candidate	Votes	%
Republican	Norris Poulson	38,577	49.5
Democratic	Charles Kramer (Incumbent)	33,060	42.4
Townsend	Calvert S. Wilson	6,306	8.1
Total votes		77,943	100.0
Turnout			
Republican gain from Democratic			

=== 1944 ===
1944 United States House of Representatives elections in California
Party	Candidate	Votes	%
Democratic	Ned R. Healy	66,854	55
Republican	Norris Poulson (Incumbent)	54,792	45
Total votes		121,646	100
Turnout			
Democratic gain from Republican			

=== 1946 ===
1946 United States House of Representatives elections in California
Party	Candidate	Votes	%
Republican	Norris Poulson	48,071	51.8
Democratic	Ned R. Healy (Incumbent)	44,712	48.2
Total votes		92,783	100.0
Turnout			
Republican gain from Democratic			

=== 1948 ===
1948 United States House of Representatives elections in California
Party	Candidate	Votes	%
Republican	Norris Poulson (Incumbent)	62,951	52.6
Democratic	Ned R. Healy	56,624	47.4
Total votes		119,575	100.0
Turnout			
Republican hold			

=== 1950 ===
1950 United States House of Representatives elections in California
Party	Candidate	Votes	%
Republican	Norris Poulson (Incumbent)	83,296	84.9
Progressive	Ellen P. Davidson	14,789	15.1
Total votes		98,085	100.0
Turnout			
Republican hold			

=== 1952 ===
1952 United States House of Representatives elections in California
Party	Candidate	Votes	%
Republican	Ernest K. Bramblett (Incumbent)	79,496	51
Democratic	Will Hays	76,516	49
Total votes		156,012	100
Turnout			
Republican hold			

=== 1954 ===
1954 United States House of Representatives elections in California
Party	Candidate	Votes	%
Republican	Charles M. Teague	69,287	52.5
Democratic	Timothy I. O'Reilly	62,786	47.5
Total votes		132,073	100.0
Turnout			
Republican hold			

=== 1956 ===
1956 United States House of Representatives elections in California
Party	Candidate	Votes	%
Republican	Charles M. Teague (Incumbent)	104,009	59.6
Democratic	William Kirk Stewart	70,567	40.4
Total votes		174,576	100.0
Turnout			
Republican hold			

=== 1958 ===
1958 United States House of Representatives elections in California
Party	Candidate	Votes	%
Republican	Charles M. Teague (Incumbent)	98,381	57
Democratic	William Kirk Stewart	74,160	43
Total votes		172,541	100
Turnout			
Republican hold			

=== 1960 ===
1960 United States House of Representatives elections in California
Party	Candidate	Votes	%
Republican	Charles M. Teague (Incumbent)	146,072	65
Democratic	George J. Holgate	78,597	35
Total votes		224,669	100
Turnout			
Republican hold			

=== 1962 ===
1962 United States House of Representatives elections in California
Party	Candidate	Votes	%
Republican	Charles M. Teague (Incumbent)	84,743	64.9
Democratic	George J. Holgate	45,746	35.1
Total votes		130,489	100.0
Turnout			
Republican hold			

=== 1964 ===
1964 United States House of Representatives elections in California
Party	Candidate	Votes	%
Republican	Charles M. Teague (Incumbent)	104,744	57.4
Democratic	George E. Taylor	77,763	42.6
Total votes		182,507	100.0
Turnout			
Republican hold			

=== 1966 ===
1966 United States House of Representatives elections in California
Party	Candidate	Votes	%
Republican	Charles M. Teague (Incumbent)	116,701	67.5
Democratic	Charles A. Storke	56,240	32.5
Total votes		172,941	100.0
Turnout			
Republican hold			

=== 1968 ===
1968 United States House of Representatives elections in California
Party	Candidate	Votes	%
Republican	Charles M. Teague (Incumbent)	148,357	65.9
Democratic	Stanley K. Sheinbaum	76,928	34.1
Total votes		225,285	100.0
Turnout			
Republican hold			

=== 1970 ===
1970 United States House of Representatives elections in California
Party	Candidate	Votes	%
Republican	Charles M. Teague (Incumbent)	125,507	58.2
Democratic	Gary K. Hart	87,980	40.8
American Independent	Maude I. Jordet	2,339	1.0
Total votes		215,826	100.0
Turnout			
Republican hold			

=== 1972 ===
1972 United States House of Representatives elections in California
Party	Candidate	Votes	%
Republican	Charles M. Teague (Incumbent)	153,723	73.9
Democratic	Lester Dean Cleveland	54,237	27.1
Total votes		207,960	100.0
Turnout			
Republican hold			

=== 1974 (Special) ===
1974 California's 13th congressional district special election
Party	Candidate	Votes	%
Republican	Robert J. Lagomarsino		53.7
Democratic	James D. Loebl		18.8
Democratic	James A. Browning Jr.		7.8
Democratic	Roger A. Ikola		6.3
Democratic	E.T. "Tom" Jolicoeur		6.0
Democratic	David H. Miller		3.2
Democratic	R.W. Handley		2.4
Democratic	F. Joe Deauchamp		1.9
Total votes			100.0
Turnout			
Republican hold			

=== 1974 ===
1974 United States House of Representatives elections in California
Party	Candidate	Votes	%
Democratic	Norm Mineta	78,649	52.6
Republican	George W. Milias	63,381	42.4
Peace and Freedom	Elizabeth Cervantes Barron	3,846	2.6
American Independent	Floyd S. Stancliffe	3,738	2.5
Total votes		149,614	100.0
Turnout			
Democratic gain from Republican			

=== 1976 ===
1976 United States House of Representatives elections in California
Party	Candidate	Votes	%
Democratic	Norm Mineta (Incumbent)	135,291	66.8
Republican	Ernie Konnyu	63,130	31.2
American Independent	William Pollock Herrell	4,190	2.1
Total votes		202,611	100.0
Turnout			
Democratic hold			

=== 1978 ===
1978 United States House of Representatives elections in California
Party	Candidate	Votes	%
Democratic	Norm Mineta (Incumbent)	100,809	57.5
Republican	Dan O'Keefe	69,306	39.5
Peace and Freedom	Robert Goldsborough III	5,246	3.0
Total votes		175,361	100.0
Turnout			
Democratic hold			

=== 1980 ===
1980 United States House of Representatives elections in California
Party	Candidate	Votes	%
Democratic	Norm Mineta (Incumbent)	132,246	58.9
Republican	W. E. "Ted" Gagne	79,766	35.5
Libertarian	Ray Strong	8,806	3.9
Peace and Freedom	Robert Goldsborough	3,791	1.7
Total votes		224,609	100.0
Turnout			
Democratic hold			

=== 1982 ===
1982 United States House of Representatives elections in California
Party	Candidate	Votes	%
Democratic	Norm Mineta (Incumbent)	110,805	65.9
Republican	Tom Kelly	52,806	31.4
Libertarian	Al Hinkle	4,553	2.7
Total votes		168,164	100.0
Turnout			
Democratic hold			

=== 1984 ===
1984 United States House of Representatives elections in California
Party	Candidate	Votes	%
Democratic	Norm Mineta (Incumbent)	139,851	65.2
Republican	John D. "Jack" Williams	70,666	33.0
Libertarian	John R. Redding	3,836	1.8
Total votes		214,353	100.0
Turnout			
Democratic hold			

=== 1986 ===
1986 United States House of Representatives elections in California
Party	Candidate	Votes	%
Democratic	Norm Mineta (Incumbent)	107,696	69.7
Republican	Bob Nash	46,754	30.3
Total votes		154,450	100.0
Turnout			
Democratic hold			

=== 1988 ===
1988 United States House of Representatives elections in California
Party	Candidate	Votes	%
Democratic	Norm Mineta (Incumbent)	143,980	67.1
Republican	Luke Somner	63,959	29.8
Libertarian	John H. Webster	6,583	3.1
Total votes		214,522	100.0
Turnout			
Democratic hold			

=== 1990 ===
1990 United States House of Representatives elections in California
Party	Candidate	Votes	%
Democratic	Norm Mineta (Incumbent)	97,286	58.0
Republican	David E. Smith	59,773	35.7
Libertarian	John H. Webster	10,587	6.3
Total votes		167,646	100.0
Turnout			
Democratic hold			

=== 1992 ===
1992 United States House of Representatives elections in California
Party	Candidate	Votes	%
Democratic	Pete Stark (Incumbent)	123,795	60.2
Republican	Verne W. Teyler	64,953	31.6
Peace and Freedom	Roslyn A. Allen	16,768	8.2
Total votes		205,516	100.0
Turnout			
Democratic hold			

=== 1994 ===
1994 United States House of Representatives elections in California
Party	Candidate	Votes	%
Democratic	Pete Stark (Incumbent)	97,344	64.62
Republican	Larry Molton	45,555	30.24
Libertarian	Robert "Bob" Gough	7,743	5.14
Total votes		150,642	100.00
Turnout			
Democratic hold			

=== 1996 ===
1996 United States House of Representatives elections in California
Party	Candidate	Votes	%
Democratic	Pete Stark (Incumbent)	114,408	65.2
Republican	James Fay	53,385	30.4
Libertarian	Terry Savage	7,746	4.4
Total votes		176,539	100.0
Turnout			
Democratic hold			

=== 1998 ===
1998 United States House of Representatives elections in California
Party	Candidate	Votes	%
Democratic	Pete Stark (Incumbent)	101,671	71.20
Republican	James R. Goetz	38,050	26.65
Natural Law	Karnig Beylikjian	3,066	2.15
Total votes		142,787	100.0
Turnout			
Democratic hold			

=== 2000 ===
2000 United States House of Representatives elections in California
Party	Candidate	Votes	%
Democratic	Pete Stark (Incumbent)	129,012	70.5
Republican	James R. "Jim" Goetz	44,499	24.3
Libertarian	Howard Mora	4,623	2.6
Natural Law	Timothy R. Hoehner	2,647	1.4
American Independent	Don J. Grundmann	2,365	1.2
Total votes		183,146	100.0
Turnout			
Democratic hold			

=== 2002 ===
2002 United States House of Representatives elections in California
Party	Candidate	Votes	%
Democratic	Pete Stark (Incumbent)	86,495	71.1
Republican	Syed R. Mahmoud	26,852	22.1
Libertarian	Mark R. Stroberg	3,703	3.1
American Independent	Don J. Grundmann	2,772	2.2
Reform	John J. Bambey	1,901	1.5
Total votes		121,723	100.0
Turnout			
Democratic hold			

=== 2004 ===
2004 United States House of Representatives elections in California
Party	Candidate	Votes	%
Democratic	Pete Stark (Incumbent)	144,605	71.7
Republican	George I. Bruno	48,439	28.2
Libertarian	Mark R. Stroberg	8,877	4.3
Total votes		201,921	100.0
Turnout			
Democratic hold			

=== 2006 ===
2006 United States House of Representatives elections in California
Party	Candidate	Votes	%
Democratic	Pete Stark (Incumbent)	144,409	74.9
Republican	George I. Bruno	27,141	25.1
Total votes		171,500	100.0
Turnout			
Democratic hold			

=== 2008 ===
2008 United States House of Representatives elections in California
Party	Candidate	Votes	%
Democratic	Pete Stark (Incumbent)	166,829	76.5
Republican	Raymond Chui	51,447	23.5
Total votes		218,276	100.0
Turnout			
Democratic hold			

=== 2010 ===
2010 United States House of Representatives elections in California
Party	Candidate	Votes	%
Democratic	Pete Stark (Incumbent)	118,278	72.19
Republican	Forest Baker	45,545	27.81
Democratic hold			

=== 2012 ===
2012 United States House of Representatives elections in California
Party	Candidate	Votes	%
Democratic	Barbara Lee (Incumbent)	250,436	87%
No party preference	Marilyn M. Singleton	38,146	13%
Total votes		288,582	100.0%
Democratic hold			

=== 2014 ===
2014 United States House of Representatives elections in California
Party	Candidate	Votes	%
Democratic	Barbara Lee (Incumbent)	168,491	89%
Republican	Dakin Sundeen	21,940	11%
Total votes		190,431	100.0%
Democratic hold			

=== 2016 ===
2016 United States House of Representatives elections in California
Party	Candidate	Votes	%
Democratic	Barbara Lee (Incumbent)	293,117	91%
Republican	Sue Caro	29,754	9%
Total votes		322,871	100.0%
Democratic hold			

=== 2018 ===
2018 United States House of Representatives elections in California
Party	Candidate	Votes	%
Democratic	Barbara Lee (Incumbent)	260,580	88%
Green	Laura Wells	34,257	11%
Total votes		294,837	100.0%
Democratic hold			

=== 2020 ===
2020 United States House of Representatives elections in California
Party	Candidate	Votes	%
Democratic	Barbara Lee (incumbent)	327,863	90.4
Republican	Nikka Piterman	34,955	9.6
Total votes		362,818	100.0
Democratic hold			

=== 2022 ===
2022 United States House of Representatives elections in California
Party	Candidate	Votes	%
Republican	John Duarte	67,060	50.2
Democratic	Adam Gray	66,496	49.8
Total votes		133,556	100.0
Republican gain from Democratic			

=== 2024 ===
2024 United States House of Representatives elections in California
Party	Candidate	Votes	%
Democratic	Adam Gray	105,554	50.0
Republican	John Duarte (incumbent)	105,367	50.0
Total votes		210,921	100.0
Democratic gain from Republican			

== See also ==
- List of United States congressional districts
- California's congressional districts
