= Lanare, California =

Lanare
- Unincorporated Community; Census Designated Place
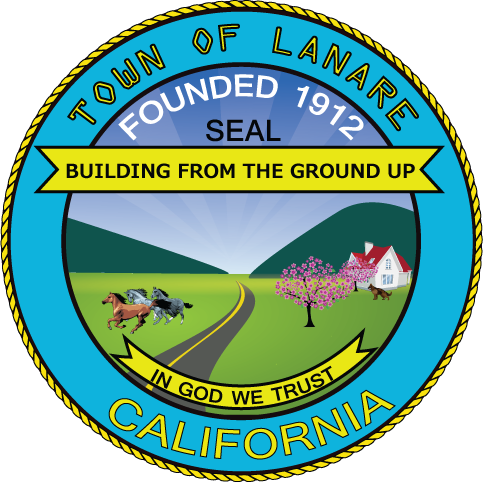
- Seal

- Location in Fresno County and the state of California

- Location in the United States
- Coordinates: 36°25′50″N 119°55′52″W
- Country: United States
- State: California
- County: Fresno

Government
  - State Senator: Anna Caballero (D)
  - State Assembly: Joaquin Arambula (D)
  - U. S. Congress: Adam Gray (D)

Area
  - Total: 2.020 sq mi (5.232 km^{2})
  - Land: 2.020 sq mi (5.232 km^{2})
  - Water: 0 sq mi (0 km^{2}) 0%
- Elevation: 207 ft (63 m)

Population (2020)
  - Total: 540
  - Density: 270/sq mi (100/km^{2})
- Time zone: UTC-8 (PST)
  - Summer (DST): UTC-7 (PDT)
- ZIP code: 93656
- Area code: 559
- FIPS code: 06-40116
- GNIS feature IDs: 1660887, 2408570

Lanare is a community and census-designated place (CDP) in Fresno County, California, United States. The population was 540 at the 2020 census, down from 589 at the 2010 census. Lanare is located 24 miles (39 km) south-southwest of Fresno, at an elevation of 207 feet (63 m). The name is derived from Llewellyn A. Nares, the community developer. Lanare is currently served by the Riverdale Post Office, zip code 93656, and students attend public school in Riverdale.

== Geography ==
According to the United States Census Bureau, the CDP has a total area of 2.0 square miles (5.2 km^{2}), all land.

== History ==
The name honors Llewellyn A. Nares, who owned the Rancho Laguna de Tache Mexican land grant. A post office operated at Lanare from 1912 to 1925. The Laton and Western Railway was built to Lanare in 1911.

== Demographics ==
Historical population
Census	Pop.	Note	%±
2000	540		—
2010	589		9.1%
2020	540		−8.3%
U.S. Decennial Census; 1860–1870 1880-1890; 1900 1910 1920; 1930 1940 1950; 1960 1970 1980; 1990 2000 2010

Lanare first appeared as a census designated place in the 2000 U.S. census.

=== 2020 ===
The 2020 United States census reported that Lanare had a population of 540. The population density was 267.3 inhabitants per square mile (103.2/km^{2}). The racial makeup of Lanare was 90 (16.7%) White, 26 (4.8%) African American, 7 (1.3%) Native American, 4 (0.7%) Asian, 1 (0.2%) Pacific Islander, 312 (57.8%) from other races, and 100 (18.5%) from two or more races. Hispanic or Latino of any race were 496 persons (91.9%).

The whole population lived in households. There were 142 households, out of which 63 (44.4%) had children under the age of 18 living in them, 73 (51.4%) were married-couple households, 11 (7.7%) were cohabiting couple households, 22 (15.5%) had a female householder with no partner present, and 36 (25.4%) had a male householder with no partner present. 23 households (16.2%) were one person, and 8 (5.6%) were one person aged 65 or older. The average household size was 3.8. There were 110 families (77.5% of all households).

The age distribution was 156 people (28.9%) under the age of 18, 57 people (10.6%) aged 18 to 24, 129 people (23.9%) aged 25 to 44, 132 people (24.4%) aged 45 to 64, and 66 people (12.2%) who were 65 years of age or older. The median age was 33.7 years. For every 100 females, there were 108.5 males.

There were 149 housing units at an average density of 73.8 units per square mile (28.5 units/km^{2}), of which 142 (95.3%) were occupied. Of these, 72 (50.7%) were owner-occupied, and 70 (49.3%) were occupied by renters.

=== 2010 ===
The 2010 United States census reported that Lanare had a population of 589. The population density was 291.8 inhabitants per square mile (112.7/km^{2}). The racial makeup of Lanare was 181 (30.7%) White, 57 (9.7%) African American, 5 (0.8%) Native American, 2 (0.3%) Asian, 0 (0.0%) Pacific Islander, 300 (50.9%) from other races, and 44 (7.5%) from two or more races. Hispanic or Latino of any race were 519 persons (88.1%).

The Census reported that 589 people (100% of the population) lived in households, 0 (0%) lived in non-institutionalized group quarters, and 0 (0%) were institutionalized.

There were 140 households, out of which 89 (63.6%) had children under the age of 18 living in them, 83 (59.3%) were opposite-sex married couples living together, 28 (20.0%) had a female householder with no husband present, 15 (10.7%) had a male householder with no wife present. There were 14 (10.0%) unmarried opposite-sex partnerships, and 0 (0%) same-sex married couples or partnerships. 11 households (7.9%) were made up of individuals, and 5 (3.6%) had someone living alone who was 65 years of age or older. The average household size was 4.21. There were 126 families (90.0% of all households); the average family size was 4.32.

The age distribution was 199 people (33.8%) under the age of 18, 62 people (10.5%) aged 18 to 24, 164 people (27.8%) aged 25 to 44, 115 people (19.5%) aged 45 to 64, and 49 people (8.3%) who were 65 years of age or older. The median age was 28.5 years. For every 100 females, there were 95.0 males. For every 100 females age 18 and over, there were 107.4 males.

There were 147 housing units at an average density of 72.8 per square mile (28.1/km^{2}), of which 140 were occupied, of which 87 (62.1%) were owner-occupied, and 53 (37.9%) were occupied by renters. The homeowner vacancy rate was 0%; the rental vacancy rate was 1.8%. 374 people (63.5% of the population) lived in owner-occupied housing units and 215 people (36.5%) lived in rental housing units.

== Education ==
Lanare is served by the Riverdale Joint Unified School District.
