= Parksdale, California =

Parksdale
- Census-designated place
- Location in Madera County and the state of California

- Location in the United States
- Coordinates: 36°56′50″N 120°01′23″W
- Country: United States
- State: California
- County: Madera

Area
  - Total: 1.74 sq mi (4.5 km^{2})
  - Land: 1.74 sq mi (4.5 km^{2})
  - Water: 0 sq mi (0 km^{2})
- Elevation: 279 ft (85 m)

Population (2020)
  - Total: 3,234
  - Density: 1,860/sq mi (718/km^{2})
- Time zone: UTC-8 (Pacific (PST))
  - Summer (DST): UTC-7 (PDT)
- ZIP code: 93638 (Madera)
- Area code: 559
- FIPS code: 06-55751
- GNIS feature ID: 1867048

Parksdale is a census-designated place (CDP) in Madera County, California, United States. It is part of the Madera Metropolitan Statistical Area. The population was 3,234 at the 2020 census, up from 2,621 in 2010.

== Geography ==
Parksdale is located in the Central Valley of California at 36°56′50″N 120°01′23″W. It is bordered to the northwest by the city of Madera, the county seat.

According to the United States Census Bureau, the CDP has a total area of 1.7 square miles (4.4 km^{2}), all land.

== Demographics ==
=== 2020 census ===
As of the 2020 census, Parksdale had a population of 3,234 and a population density of 1,860.8 inhabitants per square mile (718.5/km^{2}). The median age was 27.8 years. 35.4% of residents were under the age of 18, 10.2% were aged 18 to 24, 26.7% were aged 25 to 44, 19.2% were aged 45 to 64, and 8.6% were 65 years of age or older. For every 100 females, there were 100.5 males, and for every 100 females age 18 and over, there were 98.0 males age 18 and over.

The census reported that 99.5% of the population lived in households, 0.5% lived in non-institutionalized group quarters, and no one was institutionalized. 98.0% of residents lived in urban areas, while 2.0% lived in rural areas.

There were 759 households, out of which 58.6% had children under the age of 18 living in them. Of all households, 52.4% were married-couple households, 11.1% were cohabiting couple households, 23.5% had a female householder with no spouse or partner present, and 13.0% had a male householder with no spouse or partner present. 9.5% of households were one person, and 3.4% had someone living alone who was 65 years of age or older. The average household size was 4.24. There were 655 families (86.3% of all households).

There were 784 housing units at an average density of 451.1 units per square mile (174.2 units/km^{2}), of which 3.2% were vacant. Of the 759 occupied units, 55.7% were owner-occupied and 44.3% were occupied by renters. The homeowner vacancy rate was 0.5% and the rental vacancy rate was 1.7%.

Racial composition as of the 2020 census
Race	Number	Percent
White	686	21.2%
Black or African American	55	1.7%
American Indian and Alaska Native	278	8.6%
Asian	17	0.5%
Native Hawaiian and Other Pacific Islander	3	0.1%
Some other race	1,615	49.9%
Two or more races	580	17.9%
Hispanic or Latino (of any race)	2,912	90.0%

=== Income and poverty ===
In 2023, the US Census Bureau estimated that the median household income was $55,395, and the per capita income was $17,215. About 17.1% of families and 23.4% of the population were below the poverty line.

=== 2010 census ===
The 2010 United States census reported that Parksdale had a population of 2,621. The population density was 1,447.2 inhabitants per square mile (558.8/km^{2}). The racial makeup of Parksdale was 1,155 (44.1%) White, 56 (2.1%) African American, 65 (2.5%) Native American, 18 (0.7%) Asian, 3 (0.1%) Pacific Islander, 1,231 (47.0%) from other races, and 93 (3.5%) from two or more races. Hispanic or Latino of any race were 2,278 persons (86.9%).

The Census reported that 2,621 people (100% of the population) lived in households, 0 (0%) lived in non-institutionalized group quarters, and 0 (0%) were institutionalized.

There were 569 households, out of which 347 (61.0%) had children under the age of 18 living in them, 345 (60.6%) were opposite-sex married couples living together, 104 (18.3%) had a female householder with no husband present, 51 (9.0%) had a male householder with no wife present. There were 52 (9.1%) unmarried opposite-sex partnerships, and 4 (0.7%) same-sex married couples or partnerships. 48 households (8.4%) were made up of individuals, and 13 (2.3%) had someone living alone who was 65 years of age or older. The average household size was 4.61. There were 500 families (87.9% of all households); the average family size was 4.76.

The population was spread out, with 959 people (36.6%) under the age of 18, 335 people (12.8%) aged 18 to 24, 651 people (24.8%) aged 25 to 44, 502 people (19.2%) aged 45 to 64, and 174 people (6.6%) who were 65 years of age or older. The median age was 25.4 years. For every 100 females, there were 111.2 males. For every 100 females age 18 and over, there were 113.9 males.

There were 614 housing units at an average density of 339.0 per square mile (130.9/km^{2}), of which 366 (64.3%) were owner-occupied, and 203 (35.7%) were occupied by renters. The homeowner vacancy rate was 1.3%; the rental vacancy rate was 3.8%. 1,596 people (60.9% of the population) lived in owner-occupied housing units and 1,025 people (39.1%) lived in rental housing units.

== Government ==
In the California State Legislature, Parksdale is in the 14th senatorial district, represented by Democrat Anna Caballero, and the 27th Assembly district, represented by Democrat Esmeralda Soria.

In the United States House of Representatives, Parksdale is in California's 13th congressional district, represented by Democrat Adam Gray as of January 2025.
