= Parkwood, California =

Parkwood
- Census-designated place
- Location in Madera County and the state of California

- Location in the United States
- Coordinates: 36°55′37″N 120°02′41″W
- Country: United States
- State: California
- County: Madera

Area
  - Total: 0.697 sq mi (1.81 km^{2})
  - Land: 0.697 sq mi (1.81 km^{2})
  - Water: 0 sq mi (0 km^{2}) 0%
- Elevation: 260 ft (80 m)

Population (2020)
  - Total: 2,307
  - Density: 3,310/sq mi (1,280/km^{2})
- Time zone: UTC-8 (Pacific (PST))
  - Summer (DST): UTC-7 (PDT)
- ZIP code: 93637 (Madera)
- Area code: 559
- FIPS code: 06-55842
- GNIS feature ID: 1867049

Parkwood is a census-designated place (CDP) in Madera County, California, United States. It is part of the Madera Metropolitan Statistical Area. The population was 2,307 at the 2020 census.

== Geography ==
Parkwood is located at 36°55′37″N 120°02′41″W. It is bordered to the north by the city of Madera, the county seat.

According to the United States Census Bureau, the CDP has a total area of 0.7 square miles (1.8 km^{2}), all land.

== Demographics ==
=== 2020 census ===
As of the 2020 census, Parkwood had a population of 2,307, with a population density of 3,309.9 inhabitants per square mile (1,278.0/km^{2}). The Census reported that the whole population lived in households.

The median age was 29.2 years. The age distribution was 32.4% under the age of 18, 11.3% aged 18 to 24, 26.9% aged 25 to 44, 19.6% aged 45 to 64, and 9.8% who were 65 years of age or older. For every 100 females, there were 99.1 males, and for every 100 females age 18 and over there were 98.5 males age 18 and over.

There were 582 households in Parkwood, of which 51.9% had children under the age of 18 living in them. Of all households, 46.7% were married-couple households, 10.1% were cohabiting-couple households, 14.9% were households with a male householder and no spouse or partner present, and 28.2% were households with a female householder and no spouse or partner present. About 12.1% of all households were made up of individuals, and 5.5% had someone living alone who was 65 years of age or older. The average household size was 3.96. There were 481 families (82.6% of all households).

There were 603 housing units at an average density of 865.1 units per square mile (334.0 units/km^{2}), of which 582 (96.5%) were occupied. Of occupied units, 52.6% were owner-occupied and 47.4% were occupied by renters. Of all housing units, 3.5% were vacant. The homeowner vacancy rate was 1.0% and the rental vacancy rate was 3.8%.

98.0% of residents lived in urban areas, while 2.0% lived in rural areas.

Racial composition as of the 2020 census
Race	Number	Percent
White	592	25.7%
Black or African American	88	3.8%
American Indian and Alaska Native	203	8.8%
Asian	26	1.1%
Native Hawaiian and Other Pacific Islander	3	0.1%
Some other race	1,011	43.8%
Two or more races	384	16.6%
Hispanic or Latino (of any race)	1,929	83.6%

=== Income and poverty ===
In 2023, the US Census Bureau estimated that the median household income was $78,194, and the per capita income was $20,355. About 21.6% of families and 21.7% of the population were below the poverty line.

=== 2010 census ===
The 2010 United States census reported that Parkwood had a population of 2,268. The population density was 3,251.2 inhabitants per square mile (1,255.3/km^{2}). The racial makeup of Parkwood was 1,138 (50.2%) White, 123 (5.4%) African American, 48 (2.1%) Native American, 22 (1.0%) Asian, 0 (0.0%) Pacific Islander, 814 (35.9%) from other races, and 123 (5.4%) from two or more races. Hispanic or Latino of any race were 1,784 persons (78.7%).

The Census reported that 2,259 people (99.6% of the population) lived in households, 9 (0.4%) lived in non-institutionalized group quarters, and 0 (0%) were institutionalized.

There were 564 households, out of which 317 (56.2%) had children under the age of 18 living in them, 295 (52.3%) were opposite-sex married couples living together, 130 (23.0%) had a female householder with no husband present, 53 (9.4%) had a male householder with no wife present. There were 58 (10.3%) unmarried opposite-sex partnerships, and 5 (0.9%) same-sex married couples or partnerships. 61 households (10.8%) were made up of individuals, and 28 (5.0%) had someone living alone who was 65 years of age or older. The average household size was 4.01. There were 478 families (84.8% of all households); the average family size was 4.24.

The population was spread out, with 793 people (35.0%) under the age of 18, 277 people (12.2%) aged 18 to 24, 592 people (26.1%) aged 25 to 44, 438 people (19.3%) aged 45 to 64, and 168 people (7.4%) who were 65 years of age or older. The median age was 26.9 years. For every 100 females, there were 102.3 males. For every 100 females age 18 and over, there were 96.9 males.

There were 601 housing units at an average density of 861.5 per square mile (332.6/km^{2}), of which 316 (56.0%) were owner-occupied, and 248 (44.0%) were occupied by renters. The homeowner vacancy rate was 1.6%; the rental vacancy rate was 7.1%. 1,175 people (51.8% of the population) lived in owner-occupied housing units and 1,084 people (47.8%) lived in rental housing units.

== Government ==
In the California State Legislature, Parkwood is in the 14th senatorial district, represented by Democrat Anna Caballero, and the 27th Assembly district, represented by Democrat Esmeralda Soria.

In the United States House of Representatives, Parkwood is in California's 13th congressional district, represented by Democrat Adam Gray.

== Infrastructure ==
In 2014 during the drought, Parkwood was one of 28 small California communities that cycled onto and off of a list of "critical water systems" that the State Water Resources Control Board determined could run dry within 60 days.
