= Madera Acres, California =

Madera Acres
- Census-designated place
- Location in Madera County and the state of California

- Location in the United States
- Coordinates: 37°01′09″N 120°04′01″W
- Country: United States
- State: California
- County: Madera

Area
  - Total: 7.28 sq mi (18.86 km^{2})
  - Land: 7.28 sq mi (18.86 km^{2})
  - Water: 0 sq mi (0 km^{2}) 0%
- Elevation: 292 ft (89 m)

Population (2020)
  - Total: 9,162
  - Density: 1,258/sq mi (485.8/km^{2})
- Time zone: UTC-8 (Pacific (PST))
  - Summer (DST): UTC-7 (PDT)
- ZIP code: 93638 (Madera)
- Area code: 559
- FIPS code: 06-45050
- GNIS feature ID: 1867039

Madera Acres (Madera, Spanish for "wood") is a census-designated place (CDP) in Madera County, California, United States. It is part of the Madera Metropolitan Statistical Area. The population was 9,162 at the 2020 census, virtually unchanged from 2010.

== Geography ==
Madera Acres is located at 37°01′09″N 120°04′01″W. It is bordered to the south by the city of Madera, the county seat.

According to the United States Census Bureau, the CDP has a total area of 7.3 square miles (19 km^{2}), all land.

== Demographics ==
Historical population
Census	Pop.	Note	%±
2000	7,741		—
2010	9,163		18.4%
2020	9,162		0.0%
U.S. Decennial Census; 1860–1870 1880-1890; 1900 1910 1920; 1930 1940 1950; 1960 1970 1980; 1990 2000 2010

=== 2020 census ===
As of the 2020 census, Madera Acres had a population of 9,162 and a population density of 1,258.2 inhabitants per square mile (485.8/km^{2}). 95.7% of residents lived in urban areas, while 4.3% lived in rural areas.

The age distribution was 28.4% under the age of 18, 10.3% aged 18 to 24, 25.3% aged 25 to 44, 22.5% aged 45 to 64, and 13.5% who were 65 years of age or older. The median age was 34.0 years. For every 100 females, there were 99.4 males, and for every 100 females age 18 and over there were 95.9 males age 18 and over.

The census reported that 99.8% of the population lived in households, 17 people (0.2%) lived in non-institutionalized group quarters, and no one was institutionalized.

There were 2,473 households, out of which 47.1% had children under the age of 18 living in them. Of all households, 65.8% were married-couple households, 5.5% were cohabiting couple households, 15.7% had a female householder with no spouse or partner present, and 13.0% had a male householder with no spouse or partner present. 10.7% of households were one person, and 5.0% had someone living alone who was 65 years of age or older. The average household size was 3.7. There were 2,126 families (86.0% of all households).

There were 2,554 housing units at an average density of 350.7 units per square mile (135.4 units/km^{2}), of which 2,473 (96.8%) were occupied. Of these, 84.1% were owner-occupied and 15.9% were occupied by renters. Overall, 3.2% of housing units were vacant, with a homeowner vacancy rate of 0.5% and a rental vacancy rate of 4.6%.

Racial composition as of the 2020 census
Race	Number	Percent
White	3,271	35.7%
Black or African American	192	2.1%
American Indian and Alaska Native	336	3.7%
Asian	119	1.3%
Native Hawaiian and Other Pacific Islander	0	0.0%
Some other race	3,449	37.6%
Two or more races	1,795	19.6%
Hispanic or Latino (of any race)	6,837	74.6%

=== Demographic estimates ===
In 2023, the US Census Bureau estimated that 26.1% of the population were foreign-born. Of all people aged 5 or older, 41.1% spoke only English at home, 57.3% spoke Spanish, 1.4% spoke other Indo-European languages, 0.1% spoke Asian or Pacific Islander languages, and 0.1% spoke other languages. Of those aged 25 or older, 69.1% were high school graduates and 11.2% had a bachelor's degree.

=== Income and poverty ===
The median household income in 2023 was $76,033, and the per capita income was $29,491. About 11.1% of families and 15.3% of the population were below the poverty line.

=== 2010 census ===
The 2010 United States census reported that Madera Acres had a population of 9,163. The population density was 1,259.0 inhabitants per square mile (486.1/km^{2}). The racial makeup of Madera Acres was 5,838 (63.7%) White, 241 (2.6%) African American, 161 (1.8%) Native American, 114 (1.2%) Asian, 5 (0.1%) Pacific Islander, 2,448 (26.7%) from other races, and 356 (3.9%) from two or more races. Hispanic or Latino of any race were 5,985 persons (65.3%).

The Census reported that 9,154 people (99.9% of the population) lived in households, 9 (0.1%) lived in non-institutionalized group quarters, and 0 (0%) were institutionalized.

There were 2,411 households, out of which 1,246 (51.7%) had children under the age of 18 living in them, 1,668 (69.2%) were opposite-sex married couples living together, 273 (11.3%) had a female householder with no husband present, 192 (8.0%) had a male householder with no wife present. There were 136 (5.6%) unmarried opposite-sex partnerships, and 14 (0.6%) same-sex married couples or partnerships. 204 households (8.5%) were made up of individuals, and 82 (3.4%) had someone living alone who was 65 years of age or older. The average household size was 3.80. There were 2,133 families (88.5% of all households); the average family size was 3.95.

The population was spread out, with 2,906 people (31.7%) under the age of 18, 934 people (10.2%) aged 18 to 24, 2,265 people (24.7%) aged 25 to 44, 2,279 people (24.9%) aged 45 to 64, and 779 people (8.5%) who were 65 years of age or older. The median age was 31.0 years. For every 100 females, there were 101.1 males. For every 100 females age 18 and over, there were 101.4 males.

There were 2,540 housing units at an average density of 349.0 per square mile (134.7/km^{2}), of which 1,967 (81.6%) were owner-occupied, and 444 (18.4%) were occupied by renters. The homeowner vacancy rate was 1.9%; the rental vacancy rate was 5.5%. 7,149 people (78.0% of the population) lived in owner-occupied housing units and 2,005 people (21.9%) lived in rental housing units.

== Government ==
In the California State Legislature, Madera Acres is in the 14th senatorial district, represented by Democrat Anna Caballero, and the 27th Assembly district, represented by Democrat Esmeralda Soria.

In the United States House of Representatives, Madera Acres is in California's 13th congressional district, represented by Democrat Adam Gray.
