= Westside, Fresno County, California =

Unincorporated community in California, United States

Westside
- Unincorporated community Census designated place
- Location in Fresno County and the state of California

- Location in California Westside (the United States)
- Coordinates: 36°24′02″N 120°08′21″W
- Country: United States
- State: California
- County: Fresno
- Elevation: 249 ft (76 m)

Population (2020)
  - Total: 143

Westside (formerly O'Neill) is an unincorporated community and census designated place (CDP) in Fresno County, California, United States. It is located 22 miles (35 km) northeast of Coalinga, at an elevation of 249 feet (76 m).

== Demographics ==
Historical population
Census	Pop.	Note	%±
2020	143		—
U.S. Decennial Census; 1860–1870 1880-1890; 1900 1910 1920; 1930 1940 1950; 1960 1970 1980; 1990 2000 2010; 2020

Westside first appeared as a census designated place in the 2020 U.S. census.

Westside CDP, California – Racial and ethnic composition Note: the US Census treats Hispanic/Latino as an ethnic category. This table excludes Latinos from the racial categories and assigns them to a separate category. Hispanics/Latinos may be of any race.
Race / Ethnicity (NH = Non-Hispanic)	Pop 2020	2020
White alone (NH)	3	2.10%
Black or African American alone (NH)	0	0.00%
Native American or Alaska Native alone (NH)	0	0.00%
Asian alone (NH)	1	0.70%
Native Hawaiian or Pacific Islander alone (NH)	0	0.00%
Other race alone (NH)	0	0.00%
Mixed race or Multiracial (NH)	2	1.40%
Hispanic or Latino (any race)	137	95.80%
Total	143	100.00%

== Education ==
Westside is served by the Westside Elementary School District and by the Riverdale Joint Unified School District for grades 9–12.
