= Raisin City, California =

Raisin City
- Unincorporated Community; Census Designated Place
- Location in Fresno County and the state of California

- Location in the United States
- Coordinates: 36°36′09″N 119°54′15″W
- Country: United States
- State: California
- County: Fresno

Government
  - State Senator: Anna Caballero (D)
  - State Assembly: Esmeralda Soria (D)
  - U. S. Congress: Adam Gray (D)

Area
  - Total: 0.759 sq mi (1.967 km^{2})
  - Land: 0.759 sq mi (1.967 km^{2})
  - Water: 0 sq mi (0 km^{2}) 0%
- Elevation: 236 ft (72 m)

Population (2020)
  - Total: 303
  - Density: 399/sq mi (154/km^{2})
- Time zone: UTC-8 (PST)
  - Summer (DST): UTC-7 (PDT)
- ZIP code: 93652
- Area code: 559
- FIPS code: 06-59290
- GNIS feature IDs: 1659457, 2409124

Raisin City (formerly, Raisin) is a census-designated place (CDP) in Fresno County, California, United States. The population was 303 at the 2020 census, down from 380 at the 2010 census. Raisin City is located 13 miles (21 km) south-southwest of downtown Fresno, at an elevation of 236 feet (72 m).

== Geography ==
According to the United States Census Bureau, the CDP has a total area of 0.8 square miles (2.1 km^{2}), all land.

== History ==
The first post office was established in 1907.

== Demographics ==
Historical population
Census	Pop.	Note	%±
2000	165		—
2010	380		130.3%
2020	303		−20.3%
U.S. Decennial Census; 1860–1870 1880-1890; 1900 1910 1920; 1930 1940 1950; 1960 1970 1980; 1990 2000 2010

Raisin City first appeared as a census designated place in the 2000 U.S. census.

=== 2020 ===
The 2020 United States census reported that Raisin City had a population of 303. The population density was 398.7 inhabitants per square mile (153.9/km^{2}). The racial makeup of Raisin City was 56 (18.5%) White, 2 (0.7%) African American, 11 (3.6%) Native American, 14 (4.6%) Asian, 0 (0.0%) Pacific Islander, 182 (60.1%) from other races, and 38 (12.5%) from two or more races. Hispanic or Latino of any race were 266 persons (87.8%).

The whole population lived in households. There were 80 households, out of which 32 (40.0%) had children under the age of 18 living in them, 37 (46.3%) were married-couple households, 5 (6.3%) were cohabiting couple households, 17 (21.3%) had a female householder with no partner present, and 21 (26.3%) had a male householder with no partner present. 24 households (30.0%) were one person, and 9 (11.2%) were one person aged 65 or older. The average household size was 3.79. There were 53 families (66.2% of all households).

The age distribution was 96 people (31.7%) under the age of 18, 49 people (16.2%) aged 18 to 24, 72 people (23.8%) aged 25 to 44, 42 people (13.9%) aged 45 to 64, and 44 people (14.5%) who were 65 years of age or older. The median age was 26.5 years. For every 100 females, there were 91.8 males.

There were 84 housing units at an average density of 110.5 units per square mile (42.7 units/km^{2}), of which 80 (95.2%) were occupied. Of these, 44 (55.0%) were owner-occupied, and 36 (45.0%) were occupied by renters.

=== 2010 ===
The 2010 United States census reported that Raisin City had a population of 380. The population density was 500.3 inhabitants per square mile (193.2/km^{2}). The racial makeup of Raisin City was 123 (32.4%) White, 5 (1.3%) African American, 31 (8.2%) Native American, 6 (1.6%) Asian, 0 (0.0%) Pacific Islander, 203 (53.4%) from other races, and 12 (3.2%) from two or more races. Hispanic or Latino of any race were 308 persons (81.1%).

The Census reported that 380 people (100% of the population) lived in households, 0 (0%) lived in non-institutionalized group quarters, and 0 (0%) were institutionalized.

There were 81 households, out of which 48 (59.3%) had children under the age of 18 living in them, 42 (51.9%) were opposite-sex married couples living together, 15 (18.5%) had a female householder with no husband present, 13 (16.0%) had a male householder with no wife present. There were 7 (8.6%) unmarried opposite-sex partnerships, and 0 (0%) same-sex married couples or partnerships. 8 households (9.9%) were made up of individuals, and 3 (3.7%) had someone living alone who was 65 years of age or older. The average household size was 4.69. There were 70 families (86.4% of all households); the average family size was 4.90.

The population age distribution is 138 people (36.3%) under the age of 18, 53 people (13.9%) aged 18 to 24, 103 people (27.1%) aged 25 to 44, 61 people (16.1%) aged 45 to 64, and 25 people (6.6%) who were 65 years of age or older. The median age was 24.8 years. For every 100 females, there were 128.9 males. For every 100 females age 18 and over, there were 124.1 males.

There were 91 housing units at an average density of 119.8 per square mile (46.3/km^{2}), of which 81 were occupied, of which 41 (50.6%) were owner-occupied, and 40 (49.4%) were occupied by renters. The homeowner vacancy rate was 0%; the rental vacancy rate was 8.9%. 175 people (46.1% of the population) lived in owner-occupied housing units and 205 people (53.9%) lived in rental housing units.

=== 2000 ===
As of the census of 2000, the median income for a household in the CDP was $24,167, and the median income for a family was $23,958. Males had a median income of $12,083 versus $25,000 for females. The per capita income for the CDP was $11,544. About 17.6% of families and 21.3% of the population were below the poverty line, including 47.1% of those under the age of eighteen and none of those 65 or over.

== Education ==
The CDP is served by the Raisin City Elementary School District and by the Caruthers Unified School District for grades 9–12.
