= Caruthers, California =

Caruthers
- census-designated place
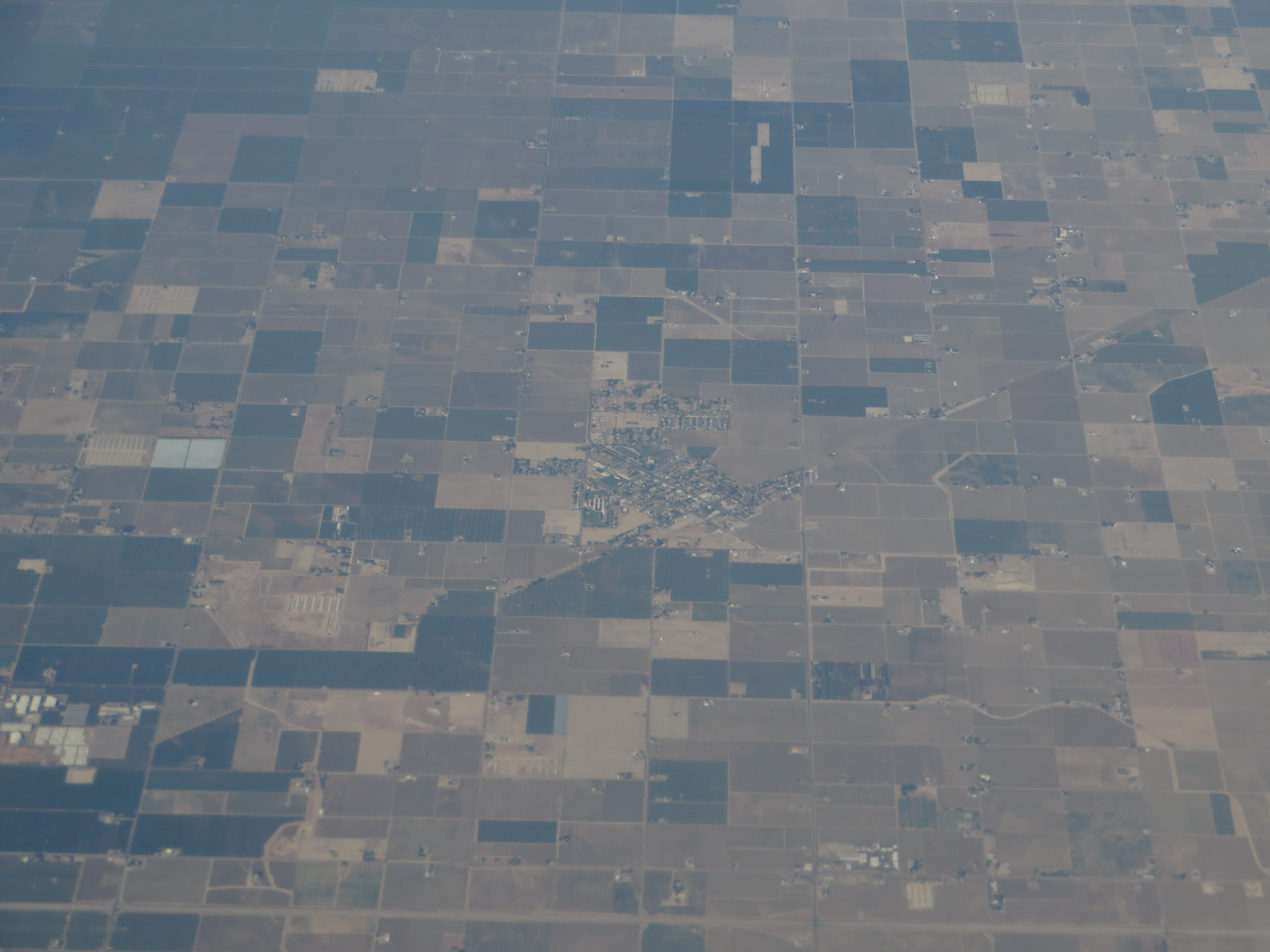
- Aerial view of Caruthers

- Location in Fresno County and the state of California

- Location in the United States
- Coordinates: 36°32′34″N 119°50′00″W
- Country: United States
- State: California
- County: Fresno

Government
  - State Senator: Anna Caballero (D)
  - State Assembly: Esmeralda Soria (D)
  - U. S. Congress: Adam Gray (D)

Area
  - Total: 2.02 sq mi (5.24 km^{2})
  - Land: 2.02 sq mi (5.24 km^{2})
  - Water: 0 sq mi (0.00 km^{2}) 0%
- Elevation: 246 ft (75 m)

Population (2020)
  - Total: 2,613
  - Density: 1,291.9/sq mi (498.82/km^{2})
- Time zone: UTC-8 (PST)
  - Summer (DST): UTC-7 (PDT)
- ZIP code: 93609
- Area code: 559
- FIPS code: 06-11614
- GNIS feature IDs: 277485, 2407976

Caruthers (/kəˈrʌðərz/) is a census-designated place (CDP) in Fresno County, California, United States. The population was 2,613 at the 2020 census, up from 2,497 at the 2010 census. Caruthers is located 15 miles (24 km) south of downtown Fresno, at an elevation of 246 feet (75 m).

== Geography ==
According to the United States Census Bureau, the CDP has a total area of 2.0 square miles (5.2 km^{2}), all land.

== History and Government ==
The first post office in Caruthers opened in 1891. The name of the town honors W.A. Caruthers, a local farmer. Fresno County Public Library opened a branch in Caruthers in 1911, in the town's hotel. After moving to multiple locations, it occupied its current home in 2003, which is designed to emulate the look of a tank house and barn.

In the United States House of Representatives, Caruthers is in California's 13th congressional district, represented by Democrat Adam Gray as of January 2025.

== Demographics ==
Historical population
Census	Pop.	Note	%±
1980	1,514		—
1990	1,603		5.9%
2000	2,103		31.2%
2010	2,497		18.7%
2020	2,613		4.6%
U.S. Decennial Census; 1860–1870 1880-1890; 1900 1910 1920; 1930 1940 1950; 1960 1970 1980; 1990 2000 2010; 2020

Caruthers first appeared as a census designated place in the 1980 U.S. census.

=== Racial and ethnic composition ===
Caruthers CDP, California – Racial and ethnic composition Note: the US Census treats Hispanic/Latino as an ethnic category. This table excludes Latinos from the racial categories and assigns them to a separate category. Hispanics/Latinos may be of any race.
Race / Ethnicity (NH = Non-Hispanic)	Pop 2000	Pop 2010	Pop 2020	% 2000	% 2010	% 2020
White alone (NH)	768	651	489	36.52%	26.07%	18.71%
Black or African American alone (NH)	5	3	3	0.24%	0.12%	0.11%
Native American or Alaska Native alone (NH)	5	2	5	0.24%	0.08%	0.19%
Asian alone (NH)	127	213	130	6.04%	8.53%	4.98%
Native Hawaiian or Pacific Islander alone (NH)	0	0	0	0.00%	0.00%	0.00%
Other race alone (NH)	8	5	10	0.38%	0.20%	0.38%
Mixed race or Multiracial (NH)	70	32	46	3.33%	1.28%	1.76%
Hispanic or Latino (any race)	1,120	1,591	1,930	53.26%	63.72%	73.86%
Total	2,103	2,497	2,613	100.00%	100.00%	100.00%

=== 2020 census ===
As of the 2020 census, Caruthers had a population of 2,613 and a population density of 1,291.6 inhabitants per square mile (498.7/km^{2}).

The age distribution was 32.0% under the age of 18, 10.1% aged 18 to 24, 25.9% aged 25 to 44, 20.7% aged 45 to 64, and 11.3% who were 65 years of age or older. The median age was 30.6 years. For every 100 females, there were 96.2 males, and for every 100 females age 18 and over there were 93.1 males age 18 and over.

The whole population lived in households. There were 687 households, out of which 49.3% included children under the age of 18, 62.4% were married-couple households, 3.5% were cohabiting couple households, 21.1% had a female householder with no partner present, and 13.0% had a male householder with no partner present. 14.4% of households were one person, and 6.7% were one person aged 65 or older. The average household size was 3.8. There were 575 families (83.7% of all households).

There were 719 housing units at an average density of 355.4 units per square mile (137.2 units/km^{2}), of which 687 (95.5%) were occupied. Of these, 60.7% were owner-occupied, and 39.3% were occupied by renters. The homeowner vacancy rate was 0.0% and the rental vacancy rate was 3.9%. 0.0% of residents lived in urban areas, while 100.0% lived in rural areas.

=== Income and poverty ===
In 2023, the US Census Bureau estimated that the median household income was $64,722, and the per capita income was $25,236. About 14.1% of families and 16.6% of the population were below the poverty line.

=== 2010 census ===
At the 2010 census Caruthers had a population of 2,497. The population density was 1,234.6 inhabitants per square mile (476.7/km^{2}). The racial makeup of Caruthers was 1,224 (49.0%) White, 14 (0.6%) African American, 38 (1.5%) Native American, 221 (8.9%) Asian, 0 (0.0%) Pacific Islander, 904 (36.2%) from other races, and 96 (3.8%) from two or more races. Hispanic or Latino of any race were 1,591 persons (63.7%).

The census reported that 2,486 people (99.6% of the population) lived in households, 11 (0.4%) lived in non-institutionalized group quarters, and no one was institutionalized.

There were 639 households, 345 (54.0%) had children under the age of 18 living in them, 409 (64.0%) were opposite-sex married couples living together, 106 (16.6%) had a female householder with no husband present, 39 (6.1%) had a male householder with no wife present. There were 35 (5.5%) unmarried opposite-sex partnerships, and 3 (0.5%) same-sex married couples or partnerships. 72 households (11.3%) were one person and 36 (5.6%) had someone living alone who was 65 or older. The average household size was 3.89. There were 554 families (86.7% of households); the average family size was 4.16.

The age distribution was 793 people (31.8%) under the age of 18, 302 people (12.1%) aged 18 to 24, 631 people (25.3%) aged 25 to 44, 528 people (21.1%) aged 45 to 64, and 243 people (9.7%) who were 65 or older. The median age was 29.7 years. For every 100 females, there were 101.0 males. For every 100 females age 18 and over, there were 96.5 males.

There were 680 housing units at an average density of 336.2 per square mile (129.8/km^{2}), of which 639 were occupied, 426 (66.7%) by the owners and 213 (33.3%) by renters. The homeowner vacancy rate was 1.6%; the rental vacancy rate was 3.2%. 1,617 people (64.8% of the population) lived in owner-occupied housing units and 869 people (34.8%) lived in rental housing units.

== Education ==
The CDP is served by the Caruthers Unified School District.

== Caruthers fair ==
Well-known events in the area include the Caruthers District Fair. It was started in 1923, after some hesitation by community members as work and expenses increased. One of the first programs at the fair involved a football game between Caruthers and Fresno State, in which Caruthers lost 41–0. In early years, the fair hosted races on sheep. Every year a fair queen is chosen, who is selected based on ticket sales. A group of girls sell them during the summer to support the fair.
