= Lion Bridge =

- Coordinates: 37°37′37″N 120°59′38″W
- Carries: Cars and pedestrians
- Crosses: Tuolumne River
- Locale: Modesto, Shackelford, and Bystrom, California
- Other name: 7th Street Bridge

History
- Construction cost: $111,000
- Opened: March 17, 1916

Location
- Interactive map of Lion Bridge

The Lion Bridge was a historic cantilever bridge built over the Tuolumne River in central Stanislaus County which connects the city of Modesto, California on the north with the census-designated places of Shackelford and Bystrom on the south.

On March 16, 2026, the bridge was closed for traffic, and construction started to demolish the bridge. Construction for a replacement is estimated to be finished by late 2027, or early 2028. The total cost of the project is $134 million.

== See also ==
- Lions' Bridge, Sofia, Bulgaria.
