= Riverdale, California =

Riverdale
- census-designated place
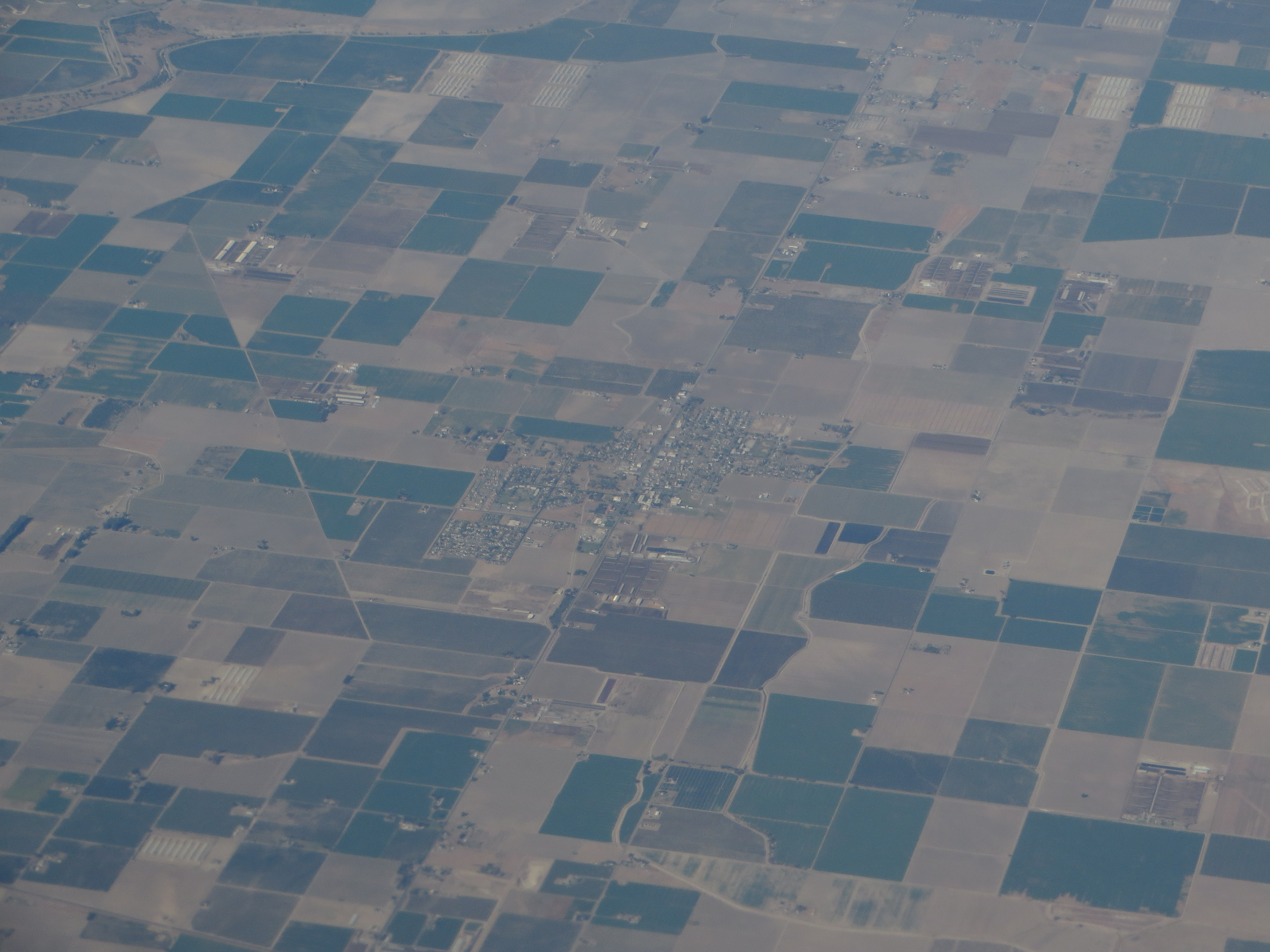
- Aerial view of Riverdale

- Location in Fresno County and the state of California

- Location in the United States
- Coordinates: 36°25′52″N 119°51′34″W
- Country: United States
- State: California
- County: Fresno

Government
  - State Senator: Anna Caballero (D)
  - State Assembly: Joaquin Arambula (D)
  - U. S. Congress: Adam Gray (D)

Area
  - Total: 3.925 sq mi (10.165 km^{2})
  - Land: 3.925 sq mi (10.165 km^{2})
  - Water: 0 sq mi (0 km^{2}) 0%
- Elevation: 223 ft (68 m)

Population (2020)
  - Total: 3,477
  - Density: 885.9/sq mi (342.1/km^{2})
- Time zone: UTC-8 (PST)
  - Summer (DST): UTC-7 (PDT)
- ZIP codes: 93607, 93656
- Area code: 559
- FIPS code: 06-61096
- GNIS feature IDs: 1661314, 2409186

Riverdale (formerly, Liberty Settlement) is a census-designated place (CDP) in Fresno County, California, United States. Its population was 3,477 at the 2020 census, up from 3,153 at the 2010 census. Riverdale is located 23 miles (37 km) south of Fresno, at an elevation of 223 ft (68 m) above mean sea level.

== Geography ==
According to the United States Census Bureau, the CDP has a total area of 3.9 square miles (10 km^{2}), all land.

== History ==
The first post office at Riverdale opened in 1875. The place was originally called Liberty Settlement, but was renamed due to its proximity to the Kings River.

Riverdale has a primary school, an elementary school, and a high school.

== Demographics ==
Historical population
Census	Pop.	Note	%±
1960	1,012		—
1970	1,722		70.2%
1980	1,866		8.4%
1990	1,980		6.1%
2000	2,416		22.0%
2010	3,153		30.5%
2020	3,477		10.3%
U.S. Decennial Census; 1860–1870 1880-1890; 1900 1910 1920; 1930 1940 1950; 1960 1970 1980; 1990 2000 2010; 2020

Riverdale first appeared as an unincorporated place in the 1960 U.S. census; and as a census designated place in the 1980 United States census.

=== Racial and ethnic composition ===
Riverdale CDP, California – Racial and ethnic composition Note: the US Census treats Hispanic/Latino as an ethnic category. This table excludes Latinos from the racial categories and assigns them to a separate category. Hispanics/Latinos may be of any race.
Race / Ethnicity (NH = Non-Hispanic)	Pop 2000	Pop 2010	Pop 2020	% 2000	% 2010	% 2020
White alone (NH)	977	920	720	40.44%	29.18%	20.71%
Black or African American alone (NH)	28	30	24	1.16%	0.95%	0.69%
Native American or Alaska Native alone (NH)	15	14	13	0.62%	0.44%	0.37%
Asian alone (NH)	43	22	17	1.78%	0.70%	0.49%
Native Hawaiian or Pacific Islander alone (NH)	3	4	1	0.12%	0.13%	0.03%
Other race alone (NH)	6	4	13	0.25%	0.13%	0.37%
Mixed race or Multiracial (NH)	110	53	98	4.55%	1.68%	2.82%
Hispanic or Latino (any race)	1,234	2,106	2,591	51.08%	66.79%	74.52%
Total	2,416	3,153	3,477	100.00%	100.00%	100.00%

=== 2020 census ===
As of the 2020 census, Riverdale had a population of 3,477 and a population density of 885.9 inhabitants per square mile (342.0/km^{2}). The whole population lived in households. 0.0% of residents lived in urban areas, while 100.0% lived in rural areas.

The racial makeup of Riverdale was 34.3% White, 1.2% African American, 1.5% Native American, 0.5% Asian, 0.1% Pacific Islander, 40.8% from other races, and 21.7% from two or more races. Hispanic or Latino of any race were 74.5% of the population.

There were 947 households, out of which 49.4% included children under the age of 18, 63.8% were married-couple households, 5.3% were cohabiting couple households, 18.3% had a female householder with no partner present, and 12.7% had a male householder with no partner present. About 12.1% of households were one person, and 5.9% had someone living alone who was 65 years of age or older. The average household size was 3.67. There were 801 families (84.6% of all households).

The age distribution was 32.5% under the age of 18, 10.4% aged 18 to 24, 26.6% aged 25 to 44, 20.4% aged 45 to 64, and 10.1% who were 65 years of age or older. The median age was 29.8 years. For every 100 females, there were 101.7 males, and for every 100 females age 18 and over, there were 100.0 males age 18 and over.

There were 980 housing units at an average density of 249.7 units per square mile (96.4 units/km^{2}), of which 947 (96.6%) were occupied. Of these, 60.7% were owner-occupied, and 39.3% were occupied by renters. 3.4% of housing units were vacant. The homeowner vacancy rate was 0.7% and the rental vacancy rate was 3.1%.

=== Income and poverty ===
In 2023, the US Census Bureau estimated that the median household income was $54,250, and the per capita income was $18,737. About 8.7% of families and 12.3% of the population were below the poverty line.

=== 2010 census ===
The 2010 United States census reported that Riverdale had a population of 3,153. The population density was 803.3 inhabitants per square mile (310.2/km^{2}). The racial makeup of Riverdale was 1,826 (57.9%) White, 33 (1.0%) African American, 59 (1.9%) Native American, 27 (0.9%) Asian, 5 (0.2%) Pacific Islander, 1,051 (33.3%) from other races, and 152 (4.8%) from two or more races. Hispanics or Latinos of any race were 2,106 persons (66.8%).

The census reported that 3,153 people (100% of the population) lived in households, none (0%) lived in noninstitutionalized group quarters, and none (0%) were institutionalized.

Of the 845 households, 482 (57.0%) had children under 18 living in them, 552 (65.3%) were opposite-sex married couples living together, 116 (13.7%) had a female householder with no husband present, 46 (5.4%) had a male householder with no wife present, 52 (6.2%) were unmarried opposite-sex partnerships, and 2 (0.2%) were same-sex married couples or partnerships; 104 households (12.3%) were made up of individuals, and 63 (7.5%) had someone living alone who was 65 or older. The average household size was 3.73. There were 714 families (84.5% of all households); the average family size was 4.09.

The age distribution was 1,111 people (35.2%) were under 18, 352 people (11.2%) were 18 to 24, 814 people (25.8%) were 25 to 44, 614 people (19.5%) were 45 to 64, and 262 people (8.3%) were 65 or older. The median age was 27.6 years. For every 100 females, there were 99.7 males. For every 100 females 18 and over, there were 95.6 males.

The 918 housing units had an average density of 233.9 per square mile (90.3/km^{2}), of which 845 were occupied and 509 (60.2%) were owner-occupied, and 336 (39.8%) were occupied by renters. The homeowner vacancy rate was 3.4%; the rental vacancy rate was 9.9%. In total, 1,879 people (59.6% of the population) lived in owner-occupied housing units and 1,274 people (40.4%) lived in rental housing units.

== Education and Government ==
The Riverdale Joint Unified School District is the school district for Riverdale CDP.

In the United States House of Representatives, Riverdale is in California's 13th congressional district, represented by Democrat Adam Gray as of January 2025.

== Notable person ==
- Alan Autry, a former Green Bay Packers quarterback, cast member of the television series In the Heat of the Night, and former mayor of Fresno, California, moved to Riverdale in the mid-1960s.
