= Cherokee Strip, California =

Cherokee Strip
- Census-designated place
- Location of Cherokee Strip in Kern County, California.

- Location in California
- Coordinates: 35°28′02″N 119°15′38″W
- Country: United States
- State: California
- County: Kern

Area
  - Total: 0.089 sq mi (0.23 km^{2})
  - Land: 0.089 sq mi (0.23 km^{2})
  - Water: 0 sq mi (0.00 km^{2}) 0%
- Elevation: 331 ft (101 m)

Population (2020)
  - Total: 206
  - Density: 2,300/sq mi (900/km^{2})
- Time zone: UTC-8 (Pacific (PST))
  - Summer (DST): UTC-7 (PDT)
- GNIS feature IDs: 1660475; 2629760

Cherokee Strip is a census-designated place in Kern County, California, United States. It is located 2.5 miles (4 km) south-southeast of Shafter, at an elevation of 331 feet (101 m). The population was 206 at the 2020 census.

== Demographics ==
Historical population
Census	Pop.	Note	%±
2010	227		—
2020	206		−9.3%
U.S. Decennial Census; 1860–1870 1880-1890; 1900 1910 1920; 1930 1940 1950; 1960 1970 1980; 1990 2000 2010; 2020

Cherokee Strip first appeared as a census designated place in the 2010 U.S. census.

=== Racial and ethnic composition ===
Cherokee Strip CDP, California – Racial and ethnic composition Note: the US Census treats Hispanic/Latino as an ethnic category. This table excludes Latinos from the racial categories and assigns them to a separate category. Hispanics/Latinos may be of any race.
Race / Ethnicity (NH = Non-Hispanic)	Pop 2010	Pop 2020	% 2010	% 2020
White alone (NH)	38	33	16.74%	16.02%
Black or African American alone (NH)	0	1	0.00%	0.49%
Native American or Alaska Native alone (NH)	0	0	0.00%	0.00%
Asian alone (NH)	0	3	0.00%	1.46%
Native Hawaiian or Pacific Islander alone (NH)	0	0	0.00%	0.00%
Other race alone (NH)	0	4	0.00%	1.94%
Mixed race or Multiracial (NH)	2	1	0.88%	0.49%
Hispanic or Latino (any race)	187	164	82.38%	79.61%
Total	227	206	100.00%	100.00%

=== 2020 census ===
As of the 2020 census, Cherokee Strip had a population of 206. The population density was 2,263.7 inhabitants per square mile (874.0/km^{2}). The racial makeup of Cherokee Strip was 61 (29.6%) White, 2 (1.0%) African American, 4 (1.9%) Native American, 3 (1.5%) Asian, 0 (0.0%) Pacific Islander, 109 (52.9%) from other races, and 27 (13.1%) from two or more races. Hispanic or Latino of any race were 164 persons (79.6%).

100.0% of residents lived in urban areas, while 0.0% lived in rural areas.

The age distribution was 65 people (31.6%) under the age of 18, 19 people (9.2%) aged 18 to 24, 56 people (27.2%) aged 25 to 44, 55 people (26.7%) aged 45 to 64, and 11 people (5.3%) who were 65 years of age or older. The median age was 34.6 years. For every 100 females, there were 87.3 males, and for every 100 females age 18 and over there were 90.5 males age 18 and over.

The whole population lived in households. There were 47 households, out of which 18 (38.3%) had children under the age of 18 living in them, 31 (66.0%) were married-couple households, 4 (8.5%) were cohabiting couple households, 1 (2.1%) had a female householder with no partner present, and 11 (23.4%) had a male householder with no partner present. 6 households (12.8%) were one person, and 3 (6.4%) were one person aged 65 or older. The average household size was 4.38. There were 39 families (83.0% of all households).

There were 57 housing units at an average density of 626.4 units per square mile (241.9 units/km^{2}), of which 47 (82.5%) were occupied. Of these, 22 (46.8%) were owner-occupied, and 25 (53.2%) were occupied by renters. The homeowner vacancy rate was 0.0% and the rental vacancy rate was 10.7%.
