= Bystrom, California =

Bystrom
- Unincorporated Community; Census Designated Place
- Location in Stanislaus County and the state of California
- Coordinates: 37°37′12″N 120°58′47″W
- Country: United States
- State: California
- County: Stanislaus

Area
  - Total: 0.56 sq mi (1.44 km^{2})
  - Land: 0.54 sq mi (1.41 km^{2})
  - Water: 0.012 sq mi (0.03 km^{2}) 1.99%
- Elevation: 89 ft (27 m)

Population (2020)
  - Total: 3,957
  - Density: 7,275.1/sq mi (2,808.92/km^{2})
- Time zone: UTC-8 (Pacific (PST))
  - Summer (DST): UTC-7 (PDT)
- ZIP code: 95351
- Area code: 209
- FIPS code: 06-09353
- GNIS feature ID: 1853380

Bystrom is a census-designated place (CDP) in Stanislaus County, California, United States. The population was 3,957 at the 2020 census, down from 4,008 at the 2010 census. It is part of the Modesto Metropolitan Statistical Area.

== Geography ==
Bystrom is located at 37°37′12″N 120°58′47″W (37.619981, -120.979790) in South Modesto, CA.

According to the United States Census Bureau, the CDP has a total area of 5.5 square miles (14 km^{2}), of which 5.4 square miles (14 km^{2}) is land and 0.1 square miles (0.26 km^{2}) (1.99%) is water.

== Demographics ==
Historical population
Census	Pop.	Note	%±
2000	4,518		—
2010	4,008		−11.3%
2020	3,957		−1.3%
U.S. Decennial Census; 1850–1870 1880-1890; 1900 1910 1920; 1930 1940 1950; 1960 1970 1980; 1990 2000 2010

Bystrom first appeared as a census designated place in the 2000 U.S. census.

=== 2020 census ===
As of the 2020 census, Bystrom had a population of 3,957. The population density was 7,273.9 inhabitants per square mile (2,808.5/km^{2}). The median age was 31.3 years. 29.8% of residents were under the age of 18, 11.4% were aged 18 to 24, 26.0% were aged 25 to 44, 21.9% were aged 45 to 64, and 11.0% were 65 years of age or older. For every 100 females there were 106.1 males, and for every 100 females age 18 and over there were 106.8 males age 18 and over.

Racial composition as of the 2020 census
Race	Number	Percent
White	969	24.5%
Black or African American	33	0.8%
American Indian and Alaska Native	103	2.6%
Asian	80	2.0%
Native Hawaiian and Other Pacific Islander	8	0.2%
Some other race	2,220	56.1%
Two or more races	544	13.7%
Hispanic or Latino (of any race)	3,256	82.3%

The census reported that 99.2% of the population lived in households, 0.8% lived in non-institutionalized group quarters, and no one was institutionalized. 100.0% of residents lived in urban areas, while 0.0% lived in rural areas.

There were 1,119 households, of which 45.0% had children under the age of 18 living in them. Of all households, 42.9% were married-couple households, 8.7% were cohabiting couple households, 26.3% were households with a female householder and no spouse or partner present, and 22.2% were households with a male householder and no spouse or partner present. About 20.1% of households were made up of individuals, and 6.0% had someone living alone who was 65 years of age or older. The average household size was 3.51. There were 842 families (75.2% of all households).

There were 1,150 housing units at an average density of 2,114.0 units per square mile (816.2 units/km^{2}), of which 1,119 (97.3%) were occupied. Of these, 48.7% were owner-occupied, and 51.3% were occupied by renters. The vacancy rate was 2.7%, with a homeowner vacancy rate of 0.0% and a rental vacancy rate of 2.4%.

=== Income and poverty ===
In 2023, the US Census Bureau estimated that the median household income was $42,212, and the per capita income was $15,991. About 35.8% of families and 30.5% of the population were below the poverty line.

=== 2010 census ===
At the 2010 census Bystrom had a population of 4,008. The population density was 5,512.5 inhabitants per square mile (2,128.4/km^{2}). The racial makeup of Bystrom was 2,006 (50.0%) White, 79 (2.0%) African American, 62 (1.5%) Native American, 91 (2.3%) Asian, 18 (0.4%) Pacific Islander, 1,580 (39.4%) from other races, and 172 (4.3%) from two or more races. Hispanic or Latino of any race were 3,053 persons (76.2%).

The census reported that 3,978 people (99.3% of the population) lived in households, 30 (0.7%) lived in non-institutionalized group quarters, and no one was institutionalized.

There were 1,072 households, 557 (52.0%) had children under the age of 18 living in them, 489 (45.6%) were opposite-sex married couples living together, 217 (20.2%) had a female householder with no husband present, 120 (11.2%) had a male householder with no wife present. There were 123 (11.5%) unmarried opposite-sex partnerships, and 5 (0.5%) same-sex married couples or partnerships. 172 households (16.0%) were one person and 55 (5.1%) had someone living alone who was 65 or older. The average household size was 3.71. There were 826 families (77.1% of households); the average family size was 4.14.

The age distribution was 1,335 people (33.3%) under the age of 18, 443 people (11.1%) aged 18 to 24, 1,128 people (28.1%) aged 25 to 44, 825 people (20.6%) aged 45 to 64, and 277 people (6.9%) who were 65 or older. The median age was 28.3 years. For every 100 females, there were 110.0 males. For every 100 females age 18 and over, there were 110.5 males.

There were 1,156 housing units at an average density of 1,589.9 per square mile, of the occupied units 529 (49.3%) were owner-occupied and 543 (50.7%) were rented. The homeowner vacancy rate was 0.2%; the rental vacancy rate was 8.9%. 1,909 people (47.6% of the population) lived in owner-occupied housing units and 2,069 people (51.6%) lived in rental housing units.

== Government ==
In the California State Legislature, Bystrom is in the 4th senatorial district, represented by Republican Marie Alvarado-Gil, and the 22nd Assembly district, represented by Republican Juan Alanis.

In the United States House of Representatives, Bystrom is in California's 13th congressional district, represented by Democrat Adam Gray as of January 2025.
