= Firebaugh Airport =

- IATA: none; ICAO: none; FAA LID: F34

Summary
- Airport type: Public
- Operator: City of Firebaugh
- Location: Firebaugh, California
- Elevation AMSL: 157 ft (48 m)
- Coordinates: 36°51′36″N 120°27′52″W
- Interactive map of Firebaugh Airport

Runways
Direction	Length		Surface
Direction	ft	m	Surface
12/30	3,102	945	Asphalt

Firebaugh Airport (FAA LID: F34), formerly Q49, is a public airport located one mile (1.6 km) west of Firebaugh, serving Fresno County, California, United States. It is mostly used for general aviation.

== Facilities ==
Firebaugh Airport covers 37 acres and has one runway:

- Runway 12/30: 3,102 x 60 ft (945 x 18 m), surface: asphalt
