= Adam Gray =

American politician (born 1977)

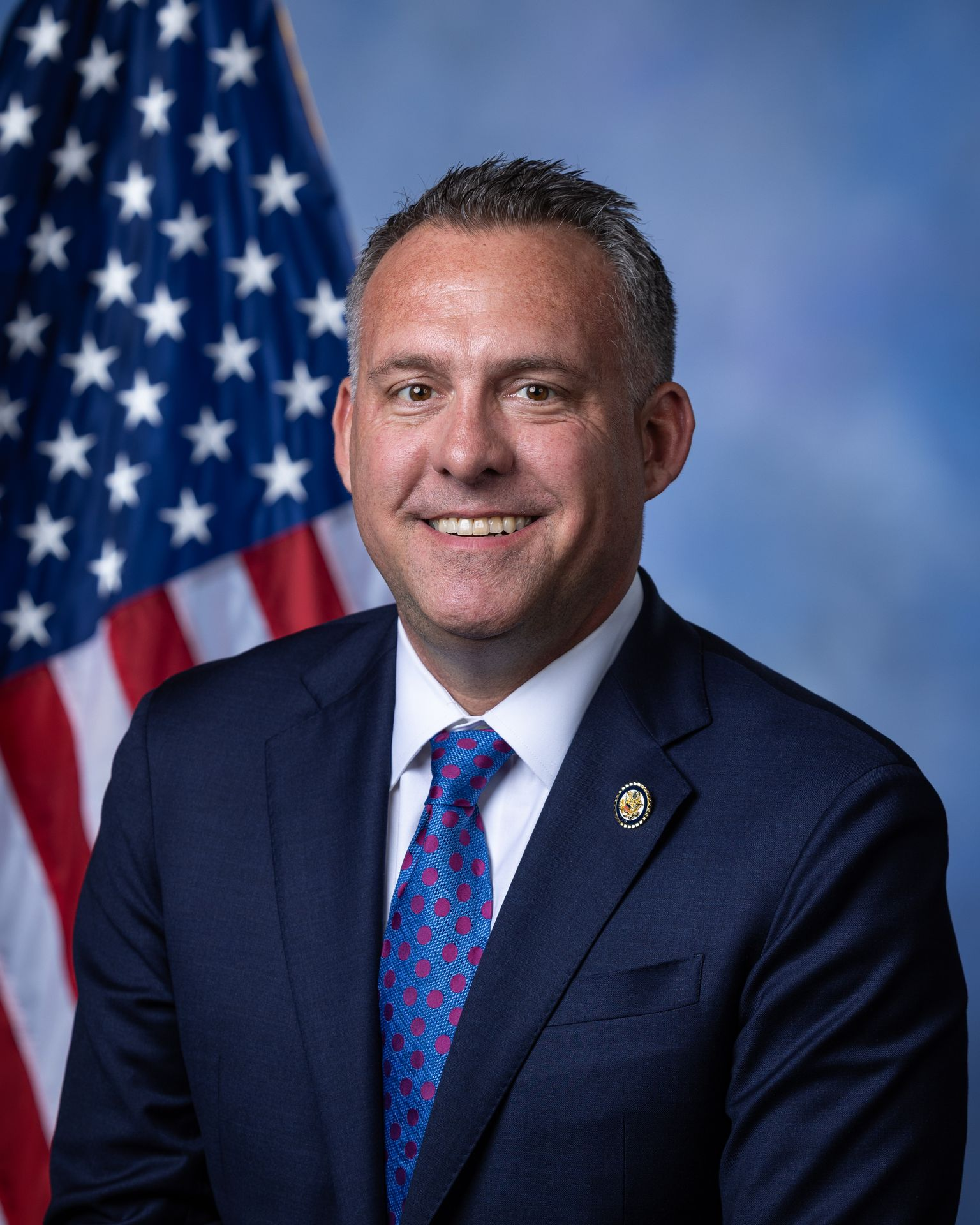
- Official portrait, 2025

Member of the U.S. House of Representatives from California's 13th district
- Incumbent
- Assumed office January 3, 2025
- Preceded by: John Duarte

Member of the California State Assembly from the 21st district
- In office December 3, 2012 – December 5, 2022
- Preceded by: Bill Berryhill (redistricted)
- Succeeded by: Esmeralda Soria (redistricted)

Personal details
- Born: Adam Channing Gray; September 23, 1977 (age 49) Merced, California, U.S.
- Party: Democratic
- Spouse: Cadee Condit (divorced)
- Children: 1
- Education: Merced College (attended); University of California, Santa Barbara (BA)
- Website: House website Campaign website

Adam Channing Gray (born September 23, 1977) is an American politician who has served as the U.S. representative for California's 13th congressional district since 2025. A member of the Democratic Party, he previously served in the California State Assembly from 2012 to 2022, representing the 21st district, which included all of Merced County and portions of Stanislaus County.

Gray is the whip of the Blue Dog Coalition. He lost his first bid for his congressional district in 2022 by a few hundred votes but won the seat in 2024 by a similar narrow margin. His district is in the San Joaquin Valley, including all of Merced County and parts of Madera, Stanislaus, Fresno, and San Joaquin counties.

== Early life and education ==
Adam Channing Gray was born on September 23, 1977, in Merced, California. He grew up working in his family's dairy supply and feed store, and went to Golden Valley High School in Merced and graduated in its first class.

Gray attended Merced College and earned a bachelor's degree in political science from the University of California, Santa Barbara while interning for Gary Condit.

== Early career ==
After college, Gray worked in the district office of state assemblymember Dennis Cardoza and later served as a staffer for assemblymembers Herb Wesson, Fabian Núñez, and Jerome Horton. He later joined the staff of state senator Ron Calderon. In 2015, he testified as a witness in connection with Calderon's federal corruption trial.

== California State Assembly ==
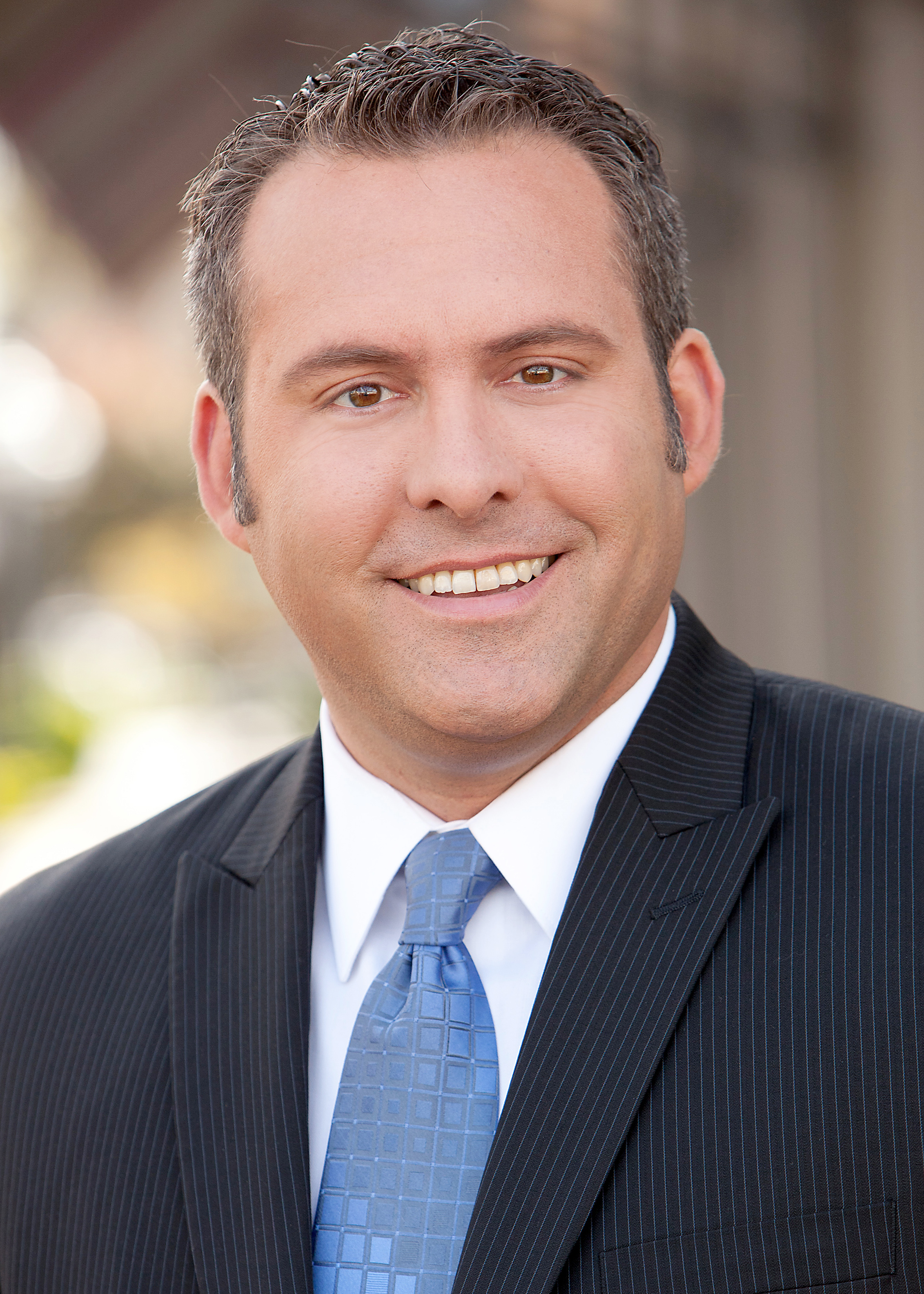
Official portrait of Gray in the California State Assembly, 2012

Gray was elected to the California State Assembly in November 2012, receiving 58.2% of the vote. In the 2014 primary election, He received 95.3% of the vote and was reelected in 2016 with 66.8% of the vote and again in 2018 with 71.3% of the vote. In 2020, he received 59.6% of the vote.

He was on the Committee for Accountability and Administrative Review, the Agriculture Committee, the Revenue and Taxation Committee and the Select Committee on Health Care Access in Rural Communities. Gray was also a member of the Joint Legislative Committee on Emergency Management and chairman of the Governmental Organization Committee.

While in the state assembly, Gray founded the bipartisan Problem Solvers Caucus which worked across party lines to pass legislation. He was involved in securing $3 billion for water storage in the Central Valley and helped bring funding for a new medical school at UC Merced. Gray broke with his party on several water policy issues, pushing back against Democratic proposals to cut water supplies to irrigation districts in the San Joaquin Valley. As a result of his opposition to proposed limits on water flows, he was removed from his chairmanship of the Government Organization Committee by the assembly leader.

In 2014, Gray supported Merced and Stanislaus counties as a potential site for Tesla Motors' multibillion-dollar "Giga-Factory".

== U.S. House of Representatives ==
=== Elections ===
==== 2022 ====
California's 13th congressional district since 2023

On January 18, 2022, Gray announced that he would be a candidate for California's 13th congressional district in the 2022 election for the United States House of Representatives. The 13th district is located in the Central Valley, and includes Merced County and parts of Madera, Stanislaus, Fresno, and San Joaquin counties. Gray advanced from the June primary and faced Republican pistachio farmer John Duarte in the November general election. He conceded the race on December 2, shortly after the race was called by the Associated Press. It was one of the last U.S. House races in the country to be decided; Gray lost by only 564 votes.

==== 2024 ====
In August 2023, Gray announced his candidacy against Duarte again in the 2024 election.

In August 2024, the Los Angeles Times reported that Gray bought real estate shortly before a $50 million state-funded redevelopment of 70 acres of the former Castle Air Force Base. Gray had disclosed the investments to state officials, but not on his federal disclosure forms after 2022. A former state ethics official noted that the timing of Gray's investment could raise concerns about the appearance of a conflict of interest. Gray's campaign manager denied any impropriety.

Following weeks of counting, Gray eventually took the lead over Duarte on November 26, by a margin of 182 votes, with the race being called on December 4. It was the last congressional race to be called in the 2024 election.

==== 2026 ====
Gray began the election cycle as one of the most vulnerable House incumbents due to the closeness of his 2024 election. In November 2025, California voters approved Proposition 50, which temporarily redrew the state's district maps. The redrawn 13th district extended north to take in the southern half of Stockton, a change that shifted the district slightly toward Democrats. The redrawn district would have favored Kamala Harris over Donald Trump by half a percentage point in the 2024 presidential election.

Days after Proposition 50 passed, Kevin Lincoln, the Republican former mayor of Stockton, abandoned a planned rematch against Democrat Josh Harder in the 9th district where he lost by 4% in 2024, and announced a campaign against Gray in the 13th, which now included his home city. Ceres mayor Javier Lopez, the first Republican to enter the race, had been backed by Duarte. After Trump endorsed Lincoln in December 2025, Duarte switched his support to Lincoln and Lopez said "the writing is on the wall" and stepped back from his campaign. Gray formally launched his reelection campaign in March 2026, highlighting his bipartisanship and Central Valley water and agriculture priorities.

Gray finished first in the first-round primary with 42% of the vote to Lincoln's 27.7%, and the two advanced to the November 3 general election. The Cook Political Report rated the general election Lean Democratic and Inside Elections rated it Tilt Democratic. The seat has been described as one of the few House races in California that remained competitive after the Proposition 50 redraw and has also been described as a top priority for both parties.

=== Tenure ===
Gray took office on January 3, 2025. He was appointed to the House Committees on Agriculture and Natural Resources and was named whip of the centrist Blue Dog Coalition.

Early in his term, Gray sought Republican allies on water issues important to the San Joaquin Valley. As a member of the Natural Resources Committee, Gray co-sponsored two bipartisan bills to expand federal support for groundwater storage and recharge efforts in California. He also introduced the Valley Water Protection Act, which would limit the implementation of the Endangered Species Act in cases where it could pose a national security risk or causes significant regional economic harm. With Republican Young Kim, he introduced legislation to establish a standardized rapid response system for wildfires on federal land. He later introduced legislation to establish a standardized rapid response system for wildfires.

Gray has often joined Republicans on key votes and is seen as a centrist. He was one of 46 House Democrats who joined all Republicans to vote for the Laken Riley Act in January 2025. He and Republican David Valadao were the two San Joaquin Valley cosponsors of the bipartisan Dignity Act of 2025, which would offer certain undocumented immigrants who arrived before 2021 a route to legal status if they pass background checks and pay restitution over seven years, while mandating E-Verify for all employers and expanding border security funding. In July 2026, Gray was one of the six House Democrats to vote for the National Defense Authorization Act for Fiscal Year 2027, which passed 216 to 212. He was the only San Joaquin Valley Democrat to support it.

On November 12, 2025, Gray was one of the six House Democrats who voted to end the longest federal government shutdown in U.S. history. The measure passed 222 to 209 and was signed by Trump shortly afterward. Gray said he voted for it because it funded SNAP food assistance for a full year, nothing that more than 47,000 households in his district receive benefits from the program. The vote drew praise from local officials including Merced mayor Matt Serratto and got criticism from progressive Democrats in the district.

Gray opposed the 2026 Iran war, and voted for a June 2026 war powers resolution intended to limit it. Gray also voted against the One Big Beautiful Bill Act, the Republican budget reconciliation package that passed the House 218 to 214, saying the bill "harms our most vulnerable neighbors" while providing "tax breaks to the ultra-wealthy".

In June 2026, Gray and Tom Suozzi launched a pro-capitalist, anti-socialist initiative, Promise to America, in response to three candidates backed by the Democratic Socialists of America winning Democratic primary elections.

=== Committee assignments ===
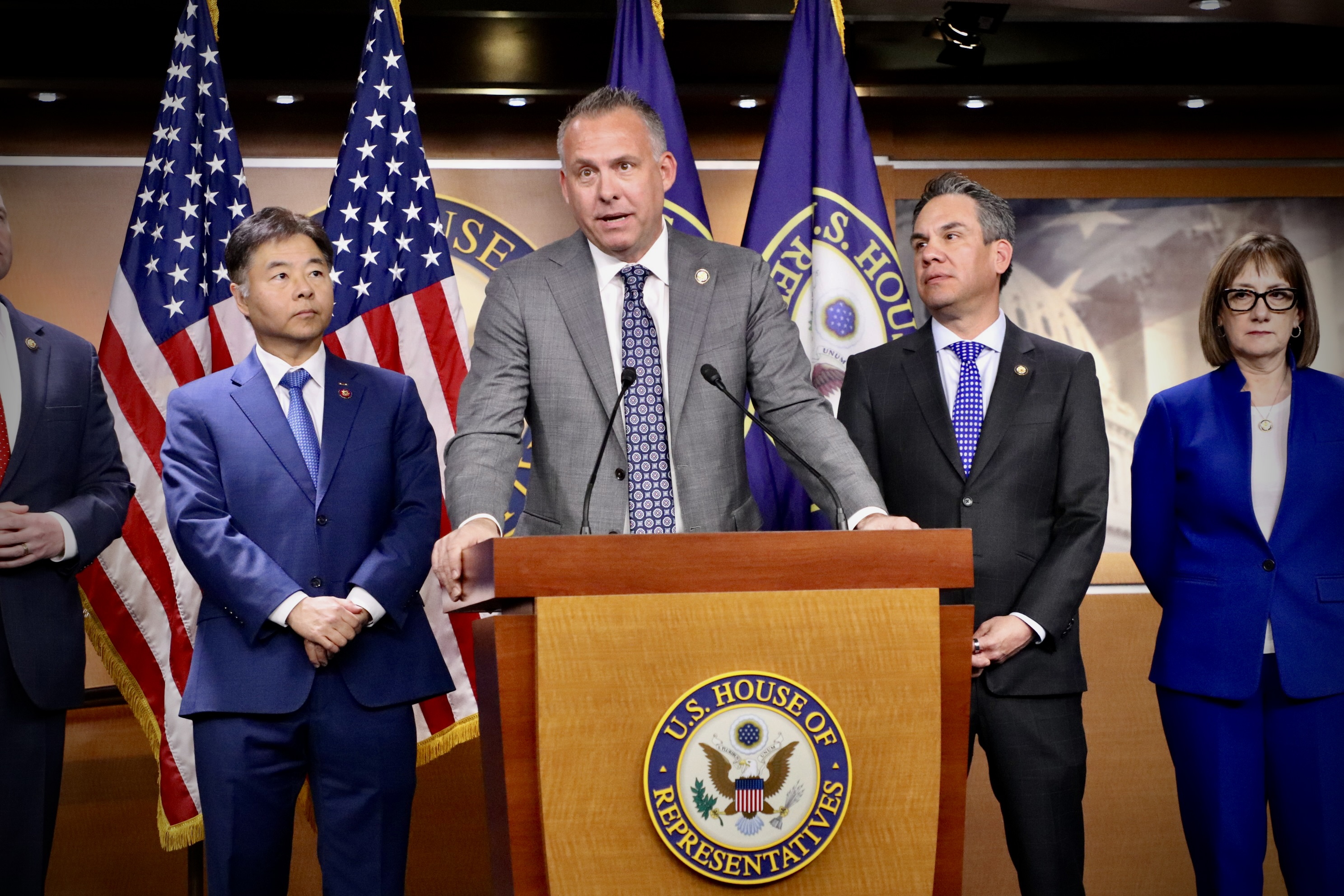
Gray discusses the risks of blanket tariffs on agriculture exports, 2025

For the 119th Congress:

- Committee on Agriculture
  - Subcommittee Commodity Markets, Digital Assets, and Rural Development
  - Subcommittee Forestry and Horticulture
  - Subcommittee Livestock, Dairy, and Poultry (Vice Ranking Member)
- Committee on Natural Resources
  - Subcommittee Oversight and Investigations
  - Subcommittee Water, Wildlife and Fisheries

=== Caucus memberships ===
Gray's caucus memberships include:

- Blue Dog Coalition (whip)
- New Democrat Coalition
- Future Forum

== Personal life ==
Gray was previously married to Cadee Condit, the daughter of Gary Condit. They have one child.

== Electoral history ==
Electoral history of Adam Gray
Year	Office		Party	Primary			General			Result	Swing	Ref.
Year	Office		Party	Total	%	P.	Total	%	P.	Result	Swing	Ref.
2012	State Assembly	21st	Democratic	14,391	32.45	2nd	63,349	58.18	1st	Won	Win	
2014	State Assembly	21st	Democratic	26,015	95.29	1st	34,931	53.39	1st	Won	Hold	
2016	State Assembly	21st	Democratic	43,874	66.82	1st	85,990	69.79	1st	Won	Hold	
2018	State Assembly	21st	Democratic	43,023	99.89	1st	74,320	71.34	1st	Won	Hold	
2020	State Assembly	21st	Democratic	54,987	99.00	1st	93,816	59.63	1st	Won	Hold	
2022	U.S. House	13th	Democratic	23,784	31.13	2nd	66,496	49.79	2nd	Lost	Win	
2024	U.S. House	13th	Democratic	38,754	45.08	2nd	105,554	50.04	1st	Won	Gain	
2026	U.S. House	13th	Democratic	41,086	41.97	1st	TBD					
Source: Secretary of State of California | Statewide Election Results

U.S. House of Representatives
Preceded by John Duarte	Member of the U.S. House of Representatives from California's 13th congressional district 2025–present	Incumbent
U.S. order of precedence (ceremonial)
Preceded by Maggie Goodlander	United States representatives by seniority 385th	Succeeded by Abraham Hamadeh
