= National Register of Historic Places listings in Stanislaus County, California =

Location of Stanislaus County in California

This is a list of the National Register of Historic Places listings in Stanislaus County, California.

This is intended to be a complete list of the properties and districts on the National Register of Historic Places in Stanislaus County, California, United States. Latitude and longitude coordinates are provided for many National Register properties and districts; these locations may be seen together in a Google map.

There are 24 properties and districts listed on the National Register in the county, including 1 National Historic Landmark.

This National Park Service list is complete through NPS recent listings posted September 4, 2026.

== Current listings ==
	Name on the Register	Image	Date listed	Location	City or town	Description
1	Bald Eagle Ranch House		January 15, 2014 (#13001069)	511 Crawford Rd. 37°43′08″N 120°59′15″W	Modesto	
2	First National Bank of Oakdale Building	First National Bank of Oakdale Building	April 6, 2000 (#00000320)	338 East F St. 37°46′01″N 120°50′48″W	Oakdale	
3	Gold Dredge	Gold Dredge	December 16, 1971 (#71000208)	South of La Grange; 37°38′00″N 120°28′35″W	La Grange	
4	Hotel Covell		December 29, 1994 (#94001501)	1023 J St. 37°38′28″N 120°59′58″W	Modesto	
5	Kingen Hotel	Kingen Hotel	August 24, 1979 (#79003465)	30054 Yosemite Blvd. 37°39′49″N 120°27′45″W	La Grange	
6	Knights Ferry	Knights Ferry	April 23, 1975 (#75000490)	On the Stanislaus River, north of CA 108/120 and 12 miles (19 km) northeast of Oakdale; 37°49′08″N 120°40′19″W	Knights Ferry	
7	Knight's Ferry Bridge	Knight's Ferry Bridge	October 16, 2012 (#12001014)	Spanning Stanislaus River at bypassed section of Sonora Rd., about .75 mile (1.21 km) north of CA 108/120; 37°49′10″N 120°39′49″W	Knights Ferry	
8	Louie's Place	Louie's Place	August 24, 1979 (#79003466)	30048 Yosemite Blvd. 37°39′49″N 120°27′46″W	La Grange	
9	McHenry Mansion	McHenry Mansion	April 4, 1978 (#78000805)	906 15th St. 37°38′37″N 120°59′40″W	Modesto	
10	Odd Fellows Hall	Odd Fellows Hall	August 24, 1979 (#79003467)	30018 Yosemite Blvd. 37°39′49″N 120°27′49″W	La Grange	
11	Old Adobe Barn	Old Adobe Barn	August 24, 1979 (#79003462)	30173 Yosemite Blvd. 37°39′50″N 120°27′37″W	La Grange	
12	Old La Grange Schoolhouse	Old La Grange Schoolhouse	August 24, 1979 (#79003461)	30171 Floto St. 37°39′44″N 120°27′46″W	La Grange	
13	Patterson Branch Library	Patterson Branch Library	December 10, 1990 (#90001812)	355 W. Las Palmas Ave. 37°28′16″N 121°08′31″W	Patterson	
14	Plaza Building	Plaza Building	January 6, 2004 (#03001359)	Plaza #2; 37°28′17″N 121°07′44″W	Patterson	
15	Riverbank Branch Library	Riverbank Branch Library	October 10, 1996 (#96001077)	3237 Santa Fe St. 37°44′11″N 120°56′05″W	Riverbank	
16	Shell Gas Station	Shell Gas Station	August 24, 1979 (#79003464)	Yosemite Blvd. at S. Old La Grange Rd. 37°39′49″N 120°27′44″W	La Grange	
17	St. Louis Catholic Church	St. Louis Catholic Church	August 24, 1979 (#79003460)	S. Old La Grange Rd. and Floto St. 37°39′46″N 120°27′41″W	La Grange	
18	Stage Stop	Stage Stop	August 24, 1979 (#79003463)	30178 Yosemite Blvd. 37°39′49″N 120°27′37″W	La Grange	
19	Turlock Carnegie Library	Turlock Carnegie Library	January 7, 1993 (#92001753)	250 N. Broadway; 37°29′43″N 120°50′57″W	Turlock	
20	Turlock High School Auditorium and Gymnasium	Turlock High School Auditorium and Gymnasium	January 11, 1991 (#90002141)	1574 E. Canal Dr. 37°29′54″N 120°49′52″W	Turlock	
21	U.S. Post Office	U.S. Post Office	February 10, 1983 (#83001246)	Twelfth and I Sts. 37°38′28″N 120°59′48″W	Modesto	
22	Dr. Robert and Mary Walton House		December 14, 2006 (#06001133)	417 Hogue Dr. 37°44′55″N 120°59′36″W	Modesto	
23	Daniel Whitmore House	Daniel Whitmore House	April 5, 1989 (#89000230)	2928 Fifth St. 37°35′28″N 120°57′03″W	Ceres	
24	Walter B. Wood House	Walter B. Wood House	May 20, 1988 (#88000551)	814 Twelfth St. 37°38′27″N 120°59′44″W	Modesto	Moved to 143 Nebraska Ave. Modesto, CA

== See also ==
- List of National Historic Landmarks in California
- National Register of Historic Places listings in California
- California Historical Landmarks in Stanislaus County, California
