= List of churches in the Diocese of Stockton =

This is a list of current and former Roman Catholic churches in the Roman Catholic Diocese of Stockton. The diocese consists of eight deaneries in the Central Valley and Mother Lode region of California. The mother church of the diocese is the Cathedral of the Annunciation in Stockton, California.

== Deanery I ==
Name	Image	Location	Description/Notes
Cathedral of the Annunciation		400 W Rose St, Stockton	Modified Gothic church built 1942
Church of the Presentation of the Blessed Virgin Mary		6715 Leesburg Pl, Stockton	Established 1952
St. Bernadette's		2544 Plymouth Rd, Stockton	
St. Luke		3847 N Sutter St, Stockton	Parish founded 1951; current church completed 1965
University of the Pacific Newman Center		Sears Hall #220, 3601 Pacific Ave, Stockton	

== Deanery II ==
Name	Image	Location	Description/Notes
Good Shepherd Mission		305 French Camp Rd, French Camp	
St. Edward		731 S Cardinal Ave, Stockton	
St. George		120 W 5th St, Stockton	
St. Gertrude		1663 E Main St, Stockton	
St. Linus		2620 S B St, Stockton	Original parish built in 1950s and destroyed by fire in 1978; current church built 1980
St. Mary of the Assumption		203 Washington St, Stockton	

== Deanery III ==
Name	Image	Location	Description/Notes
Holy Cross		18633 E Front St, Linden	
St. Anne		215 W Walnut St, Lodi	
St. Joachim		13392 E Lockeford Ranch Rd #9407, Lockeford	Parish formed 1876
St. Michael		5882 N Ashley Ln, Stockton	

== Deanery IV ==
Name	Image	Location	Description/Notes
Our Lady of Guadalupe		16200 Cambridge Dr, Lathrop	
St. Anthony's		505 E North St, Manteca	Parish dates to 1914
St. Bernard		165 W Eaton Ave, Tracy	Parish formed 1908; current church built 1951

== Deanery V ==
Name	Image	Location	Description/Notes
Holy Family		4212 Dale Rd, Modesto	
Our Lady of San Juan de Los Lagos Chapel		4643 Flint Ave, Salida	
St. Frances of Rome		2827 Topeka St, Riverbank	
St. Mary of the Annunciation		1225 Olive St, Oakdale	
St. Patrick		19399 CA-120, Ripon	

== Deanery VI ==
Name	Image	Location	Description/Notes
All Saints University Parish		4040 McKenna Dr, Turlock	
Church of the Immaculate Heart of Mary		22031 H St, Crows Landing	
Our Lady of the Assumption of the Portuguese Church		2602 S Walnut Rd, Turlock	
Sacred Heart		529 I St, Patterson	Established as a mission in 1902 and as an independent parish in 1925; current church dedicated 1949
Sacred Heart		1301 Cooper Ave, Turlock	
St. Joachim		1121 Main St, Newman	

== Deanery VII ==
Name	Image	Location	Description/Notes
Our Lady of Fatima		Modesto	
St. Anthony		7820 Fox Rd, Hughson	Parish dates to 1918
St. Joseph		1813 Oakdale Rd, Modesto	Parish formed 1967
St. Jude		3824 Mitchell Rd, Ceres	
St. Louis		30201 Floto St, La Grange	Vernacular Greek Revival built in 1854, list on the National Register of Historic Places in 1979
St. Stanislaus		1200 Maze Blvd, Modesto	

== Deanery VIII ==
Name	Image	Location	Description/Notes
All Saints		18674 Cherokee Dr, Twain Harte	
Infant of Prague		74396 US-395, Bridgeport	
Our Lady of Fatima Mission		22581 Westpoint Pioneer, West Point	
Our Lady of Mount Carmel		1700 Catholic Cemetery Rd, Big Oak Flat	
Our Lady of the Sierra Mission		1301 Linebaugh Rd, Arnold	
Our Savior of the Mountains Mission		85 Mono Lake Ave, Lee Vining	
Pinecrest Station Mission		Pinecrest	
St. Andrew		162 Church Hill Rd, San Andreas	Parish dates to 1848 Gold Rush
St. Ignatius Mission		385 O`Brynes Ferry Rd, Copperopolis	
St. Joseph		58 Ranch Rd, Mammoth Lakes	
St. Joseph Mission		18473 Gardner Ave, Tuolumne City	
St. Patrick		820 S Main St, Angels Camp	
St. Patrick		116 Bradford St, Sonora	
St. Patrick Mission		619 Sheep Ranch Rd, Murphys	
St. Thomas Aquinas Mission		8398 Lafayette St, Mokelumne Hill	
