= California Historical Landmarks in Stanislaus County =

This list includes properties and districts listed on the California Historical Landmark listing in Stanislaus County, California. Click the "Map of all coordinates" link to the right to view a Google map of all properties and districts with latitude and longitude coordinates in the table below.

| Image | | Landmark name | Location | City or town | Summary |
|---|---|---|---|---|---|
| Empire City | 418 | Empire City | Empire Community Park; 37°38′14″N 120°54′10″W | Empire | |
| Knights Ferry | 347 | Knights Ferry | Historic district 37°49′08″N 120°40′19″W | Knights Ferry | Also on the NRHP list as NPS-75000490 |
| La Grange | 414 | La Grange | Historic district 37°39′49″N 120°27′49″W | La Grange | |
| Turlock Assembly Center | 934 | Turlock Assembly Center | Stanislaus County Fairgrounds; 37°30′06″N 120°51′28″W | Turlock | |
| Willms Ranch | 415 | Willms Ranch | Willms Rd, 1.3 mi S of State Hwy 120; 37°48′01″N 120°38′44″W | Knights Ferry | |

== See also ==
- List of California Historical Landmarks
- National Register of Historic Places listings in Stanislaus County, California
