= Shell Gas Station (La Grange, California) =

- U.S. National Register of Historic Places
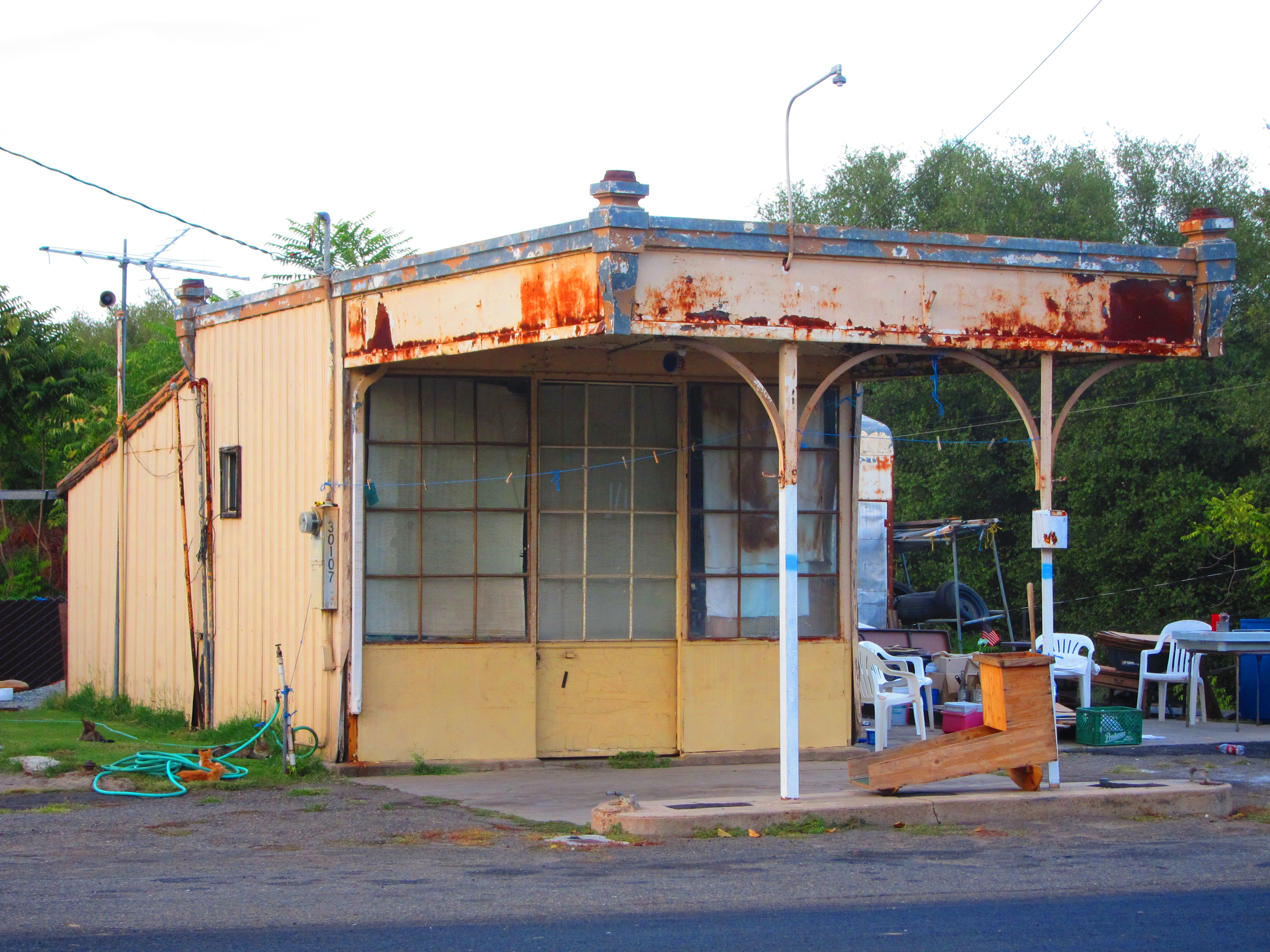

- Location within California
- Location: Yosemite Blvd., La Grange, California
- Coordinates: 37°39′50″N 120°27′41″W
- Area: 0 acres (0 ha)
- Built: 1925
- Architectural style: Moderne, Streamline
- MPS: La Grange MRA
- NRHP reference No.: 79003464
- Added to NRHP: August 24, 1979

The Shell Gas Station on Yosemite Blvd. in La Grange, California, was built in 1925 by Shell USA.

It was asserted to be "A rare vernacular example of this architectural type and period" and was described succinctly:

Prefabricated tin service station comprised of main building, projecting covered service area and separate restroom unit. Finials decorate the four corners of the flat-roofed service area. Poignantly distinctive restroom unit also prefabricated tin; completely free standing, with rounded lines reflective of nascent Moderne.
