= Old La Grange Schoolhouse =

- U.S. National Register of Historic Places
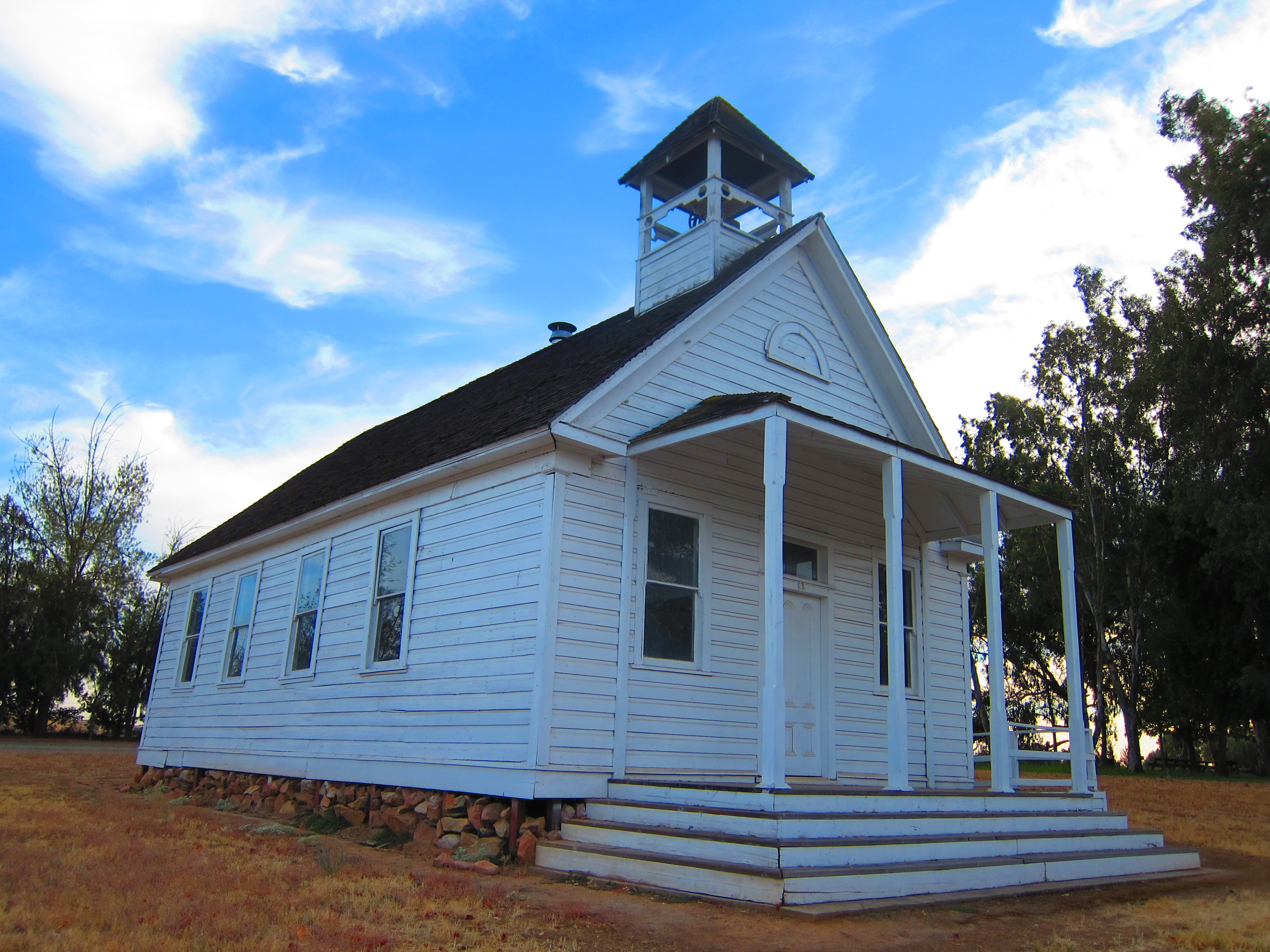

- Location within California Location within the United States
- Location: La Grange Rd. and Floto St., La Grange, California
- Coordinates: 37°39′44″N 120°27′35″W
- Area: 1 acre (0.40 ha)
- Built: 1875, c.1900
- Architectural style: Greek Revival, Vernacular Greek Revival
- MPS: La Grange MRA
- NRHP reference No.: 79003461
- Added to NRHP: August 24, 1979

The Old La Grange Schoolhouse in La Grange, California is a Vernacular Greek Revival architecture building built in 1875 and modified in c. 1900, when its tower and porch were added. It was LaGrange's first school. "Both the 1875 Greek Revival and the ca.1900 picturesque details present on the building's exterior are indicative of major stylistic trends in California at these periods."

It was listed on the National Register of Historic Places in 1979.
