= Gold Dredge =

- U.S. National Register of Historic Places
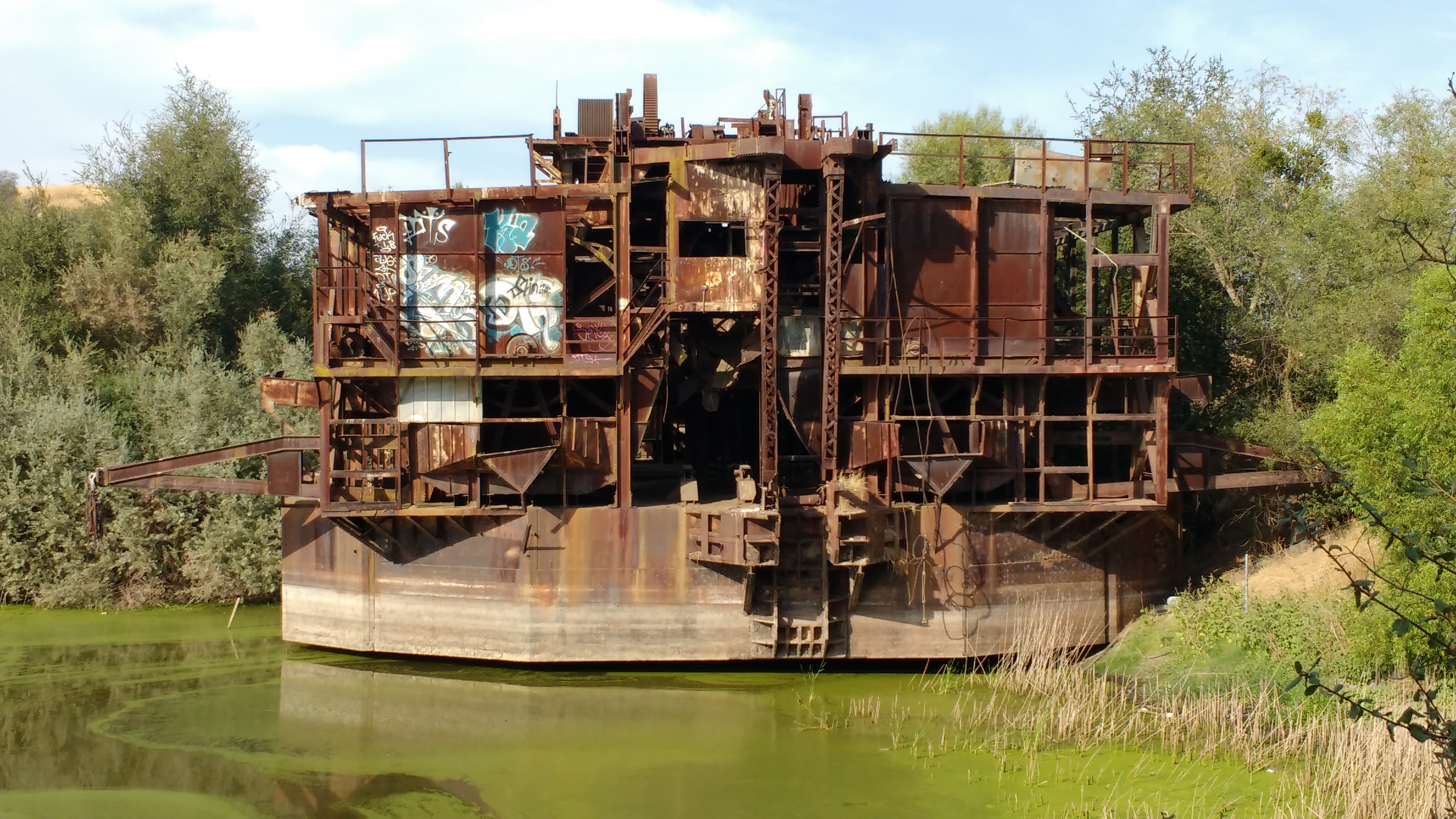

- Location within California
- Nearest city: La Grange, California
- Coordinates: 37°38′00″N 120°28′35″W
- Area: 2.5 acres (1.0 ha)
- Built: 1937
- Built by: Johnson, Walter W.
- NRHP reference No.: 71000208
- Added to NRHP: December 16, 1971

The Gold Dredge, near La Grange, California, also known as the Tuolumne Gold Dredging Company Dredge, was built in 1937. It was listed on the National Register of Historic Places in 1971.

It was designed and built by Walter W. Johnson, who later bought the dredge himself.
