= Odd Fellows Hall (La Grange, California) =

- U.S. National Register of Historic Places
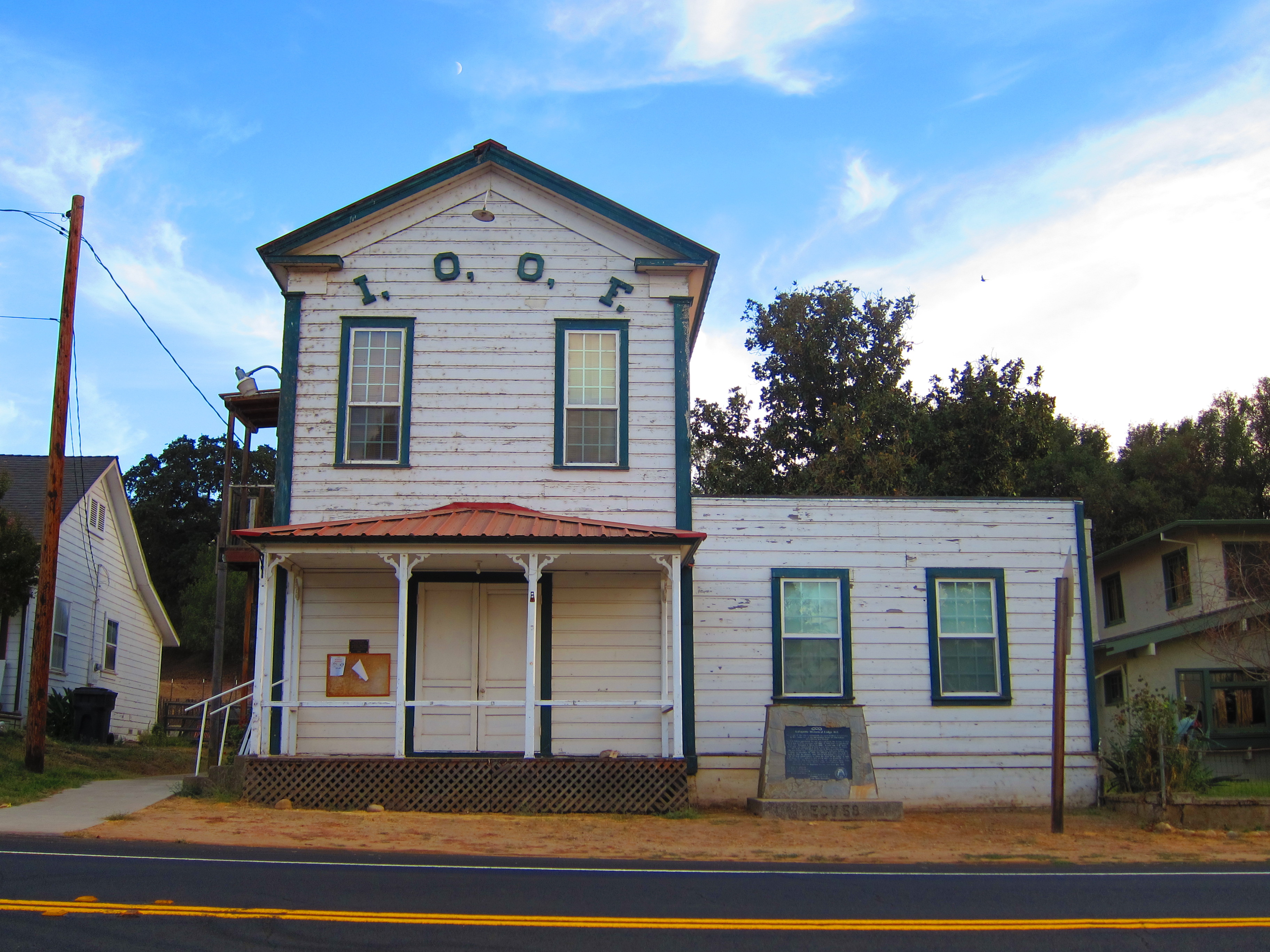

- Location within California Location within the United States
- Location: 30018 Yosemite Blvd., La Grange, California
- Coordinates: 37°39′48″N 120°27′41″W
- Area: 0.2 acres (0.081 ha)
- Built: 1880
- Architectural style: Vernacular Greek Revival
- MPS: La Grange MRA
- NRHP reference No.: 79003467
- Added to NRHP: August 24, 1979

The Odd Fellows Hall in La Grange, California, was built in 1880. Also known as the I.O.O.F. Building, it was listed on the National Register of Historic Places in 1979. It served historically as a clubhouse and as a meeting hall.

It is described as a "good example of the vernacular Greek Revival–style found in 1850s California" and "Significant also for its social function as the I.O.O.F. hall for the pioneer community."

It has a porch, likely added later in the century, decorated with jigsaw work.

It is a tall two-story wood building on a rubble stone foundation. The slope of its roof, together with its front-facing gable with box cornice returns, gives the impression of a pediment; this is one of its vernacular Greek Revival elements. Other such elements are its narrow pilasters and its three bay front with a central doorway. Its trim, which a photo shows is now painted blue, seems to have been originally painted green, contrasting with white for the building's clapboard siding, in a New England–style color scheme often used in California in the mid-1800s.
