= Stanislaus County Fair =

Annual event in California, United States

Coordinates: 37.5020°N 120.8592°W

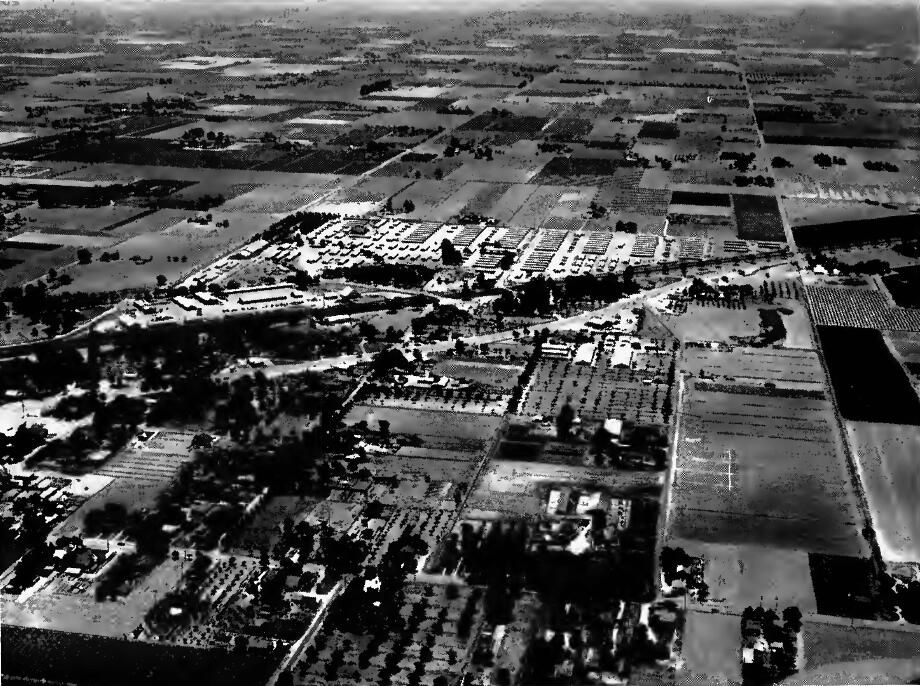
Stanislaus County Fairgrounds

The Stanislaus County Fair, located in Turlock, California, opens every year in mid-July. It is the largest event in Stanislaus County. For 10 days, more than 220,000 visitors attend the 72-acre (290,000 m^{2}) fairgrounds. There are nightly celebrity concerts, performances on five stages, and over 30 food concessionaires. The fair shows over 30,000 local talent exhibits, over 1,750 animals, and more than 35 carnival rides.

== History ==
In 1911, the Turlock Melon Carnival took place for the first time, sponsored by the Turlock Chamber of Commerce. The Turlock Melon Carnival was an effort to promote and market the local melon industry and shipping business. A group of musicians was organized to become the Melon City Band.

Other than 1917–18, the Melon Carnival lasted only a few years, and in 1924 the American Legion Rex Ish Post 88 organized a Fourth of July celebration for largely the same purpose. In 1925 the American Legion resurrected the name Turlock Melon Carnival for the mid-summer festival, and in 1927 a seven-acre plot of land was purchased to give the Carnival a permanent home. By the early 1940s, the fairgrounds had grown to 37 acres.

The 4H and Future Farmers of America livestock shows were instituted in 1933, and in 1935 the State of California issued a charter that established the 38th District Agriculture Association (DAA), which remains today. The “fair” was run jointly by the American Legion post and the DAA until 1944, when the American Legion sold the site and buildings to the DAA, which has had sole responsibility for its operation ever since.

No fairs were held during World War II, although the carnivals and horse pulling events continued in the downtown area. The fairgrounds were turned over to the Wartime Civilian Control Administration, which oversaw the "evacuation" of Japanese Americans from the West Coast under the provisions of Executive Order 9066. The Turlock Assembly Center was one of fifteen temporary camps where Japanese Americans were held while the more permanent War Relocation Authority concentration camps were being constructed. Turlock opened on April 30, 1942, and a total of 3,669 Japanese Americans from the Sacramento River Delta and Los Angeles areas passed through the camp before it closed on August 12. As in several other WCCA sites, many of the inmates were housed in "apartments" that had been converted from livestock stalls, while others lived in military-style barracks.

After the assembly center shut down, the site was converted into a Rehabilitation Center for the U.S. Army Ninth Service Command, from 1942 to 1945. The Turlock Rehabilitation Center was used to discipline and rehabilitate soldiers who had violated military orders and prepare them for reinstatement, the Turlock Rehabilitation Center was the first of these facilities to be established and ultimately became the largest, with a peak population of 1,500.

The fair resumed operation in 1946, and in 1956 the name "Stanislaus County Fair" was used for the first time on the marquee. In 1960, the fairgrounds became the original home of California State University, Stanislaus.

On the March 15, 1999, the Stanislaus County Fair Board of Directors of the 38th District Agricultural Association, with support of the Turlock American Legion, resolved that the Stanislaus County Fair Arch Gate be recognized as a California State Point of Historical Interest. A marker was unveiled in an opening night ceremony during the 1999 fair and is on public view just inside the historic Arch Gate.

The Stanislaus County Fair celebrated its centennial fair in 2011.

Tastes of the Valley Wine & Cheese is put on by the Stanislaus State Agriculture Department and Friends of the Fair Foundation.

There had been fair interruptions in 1917–18 because of World War I, 1942–45 due to World War II; and 2020 due to the COVID-19 pandemic. There was an online event in 2020.

== Mission statement ==
The mission of the Stanislaus County Fair is to provide a family and community oriented experience promoting agriculture, entertainment and technology.

== Arena events ==
- Tuff Trucks – more than 50 competitors compete on an obstacle course filled with bumps and jumps – with two rotations around the track. Three classes compete for the quickest time: (1) Local Tuff Trucks, (2) Pro-Arena Trucks and (3) Quads (four-wheel motorcycles).
- Truck and Tractor Pulls – around 150 competitors test engines and power in as many as 15 different weight classes for tractors and four different weight classes for trucks.
- Destruction Derby I Traditional Turmoil – consists of three preliminary rounds and one consolation round. Drivers are judged simply on the number of hits made to other vehicles. The top five scoring contenders in each heat qualify for The Main Event.
- Destruction Derby II Metal Mayhem – consists of four separate “one-shot” classes including subcompacts, powder puff (females only), lightweight (1980 and newer) and ‘60’s and ‘70’s heavyweights.
- Quad Drags and Motorcycle Jumpers – two quad racers compete at a time. They pair up in a lane and at the sound of “go” each racer drags as fast as they can on a 200’ long track. The first to cross the finish line moves up to the next round of competition. To open the show a freestyle air stunt exhibition features the best of the best stunt jumpers in the area.
- CCPRA – The California Cowboys Professional Rodeo Association. Contestants compete in bull riding, team roping, breakaway roping, steer wrestling, calf roping, barrel racing, bareback, saddle bronc and all-around.
- QuadCross and Pee Wee Bikes – at least 150 riders compete. There are over 10 classes racing, including beginners, intermediate and expert riders. Quad sizes, from 50 cubic centimeters up to 300 cc, will also be considered in each racing class accordingly. Following the QuadCross event, the Pee Wee bikes compete. There will be at least 15 pee wee participants, all the age of 10 years or younger. Motorcycles size will be 50 cc. Winners of each heat will go on to the next round until a winner is declared.
- Motocross – close to 300 competitors compete. It is divided into 20 classes based on age, bike size and rider ability. Competitors will attempt five laps around the track, which is filled with jumps, turns, bumps and even a rhythm section, which is a series of small jumps. The first rider to finish is the winner.
- Mud Bog – competitors line up side by side and drive their vehicles as fast as they can into a mud pit that is 30’ wide at least 2’ deep and at least 100’ long.

== Timeline ==
- 1850s*

Stanislaus County was formed from part of Tuolumne County in 1854.

The county is named for the Stanislaus River, first discovered by a European in 1806, and later named Rio Estanislao in honor of Estanislao, a Native American chief. Estanislao was his baptismal name, the Spanish rendition of Stanislaus, the name of an 11th-century Catholic Saint Stanislaus the Martyr.

- 1870s*

Turlock was founded on December 22, 1871, by John William Mitchell. Construction of the Central Pacific Railroad at that time had reached a station designated to be named after Mitchell, but he declined the honor and suggested instead it be named after Turlough in County Mayo, Ireland. Thus, the new railroad town was named Turlock.

- 1890s*

The first annual fair of the Stanislaus County Agricultural District Number 38 was held in 1891 in Modesto. This is an early form of our current formal title, Stanislaus County Fair District Agricultural Association 38. This fair was held for several years in the nearby town but was discontinued. 1902 marked the last fair in Modesto

- 1910s*

Turlock's first ever Melon Carnival was held in 1911. It is this fair that modern-day Stanislaus County Fair attributes its start. This carnival was organized to promote trade and public relations for the community. At the time, Turlock had become known for its burgeoning melon growing and shipping businesses. The carnival was held in Turlock's downtown on Main Street where watermelons were donated by farmers and served free in a big tent. Activities included: band music, melon rolling contest, acrobatic contest, baseball games with Turlock vs. Oakdale, a parade, horse cart race between fire departments and a merry-go-round.

The Carnival was not held once the U.S. entered World War I in 1917, and for the remainder of the war. It returned in 1919.

- 1920s*

In 1925 the first Melon Carnival to be sponsored by the American Legion was held. It moved a couple times until finally for the 1927 carnival a seven-acre plot of ground was acquired at $500 per acre as a permanent location, along with an old circus tent to house commercial exhibits.

In 1929, the Fairgrounds’ ever present Arch Gate was constructed using smoothed over river boulders.

- 1930s*

1932 paid admissions 21,893. In 1935, the Stanislaus District Fair succeeded the melon carnivals and the first annual Fair horse show was held. In 1937 a nearby ranch was purchased to add to the seven acre field. 1939 The District Agriculture Association assumed sole responsibility for the operation of the fair from American Legion.

1935 was the first Kiddie Kapers Parade, where youth from Turlock paraded in costumes and on bikes, and community clubs and businesses provided floats. This parade became a popular event that some considered to be the highlight of the Fair.

- 1940s*

Additional land was purchased to grow the grounds to a total of 37 acres. In 1941 the name “Stanislaus District Fair” was used for the first time. paid admissions: 31,581

1942, the Fair was cancelled due to the outbreak of World War II. Japanese-Americans were stationed at the fairgrounds for 3 ½ months before being evacuated to inland areas of the U.S. For the remainder of the war, the grounds were used by the Army as a Rehabilitation Center. An annual carnival was still held downtown from 1942 to 1944, sponsored by a citizens committee for the purpose of aiding wartime relief. 1946, following the conclusion of the war, the Fair was resumed with 46,555 attendees and the Fair managers announced that the fairground facilities were to be available year-round.

- 1940*

August 12-August 17, Price of season Ticket - $1,

- 1941*

August 11–16, paid attendance 31,581

- 1942–1945*

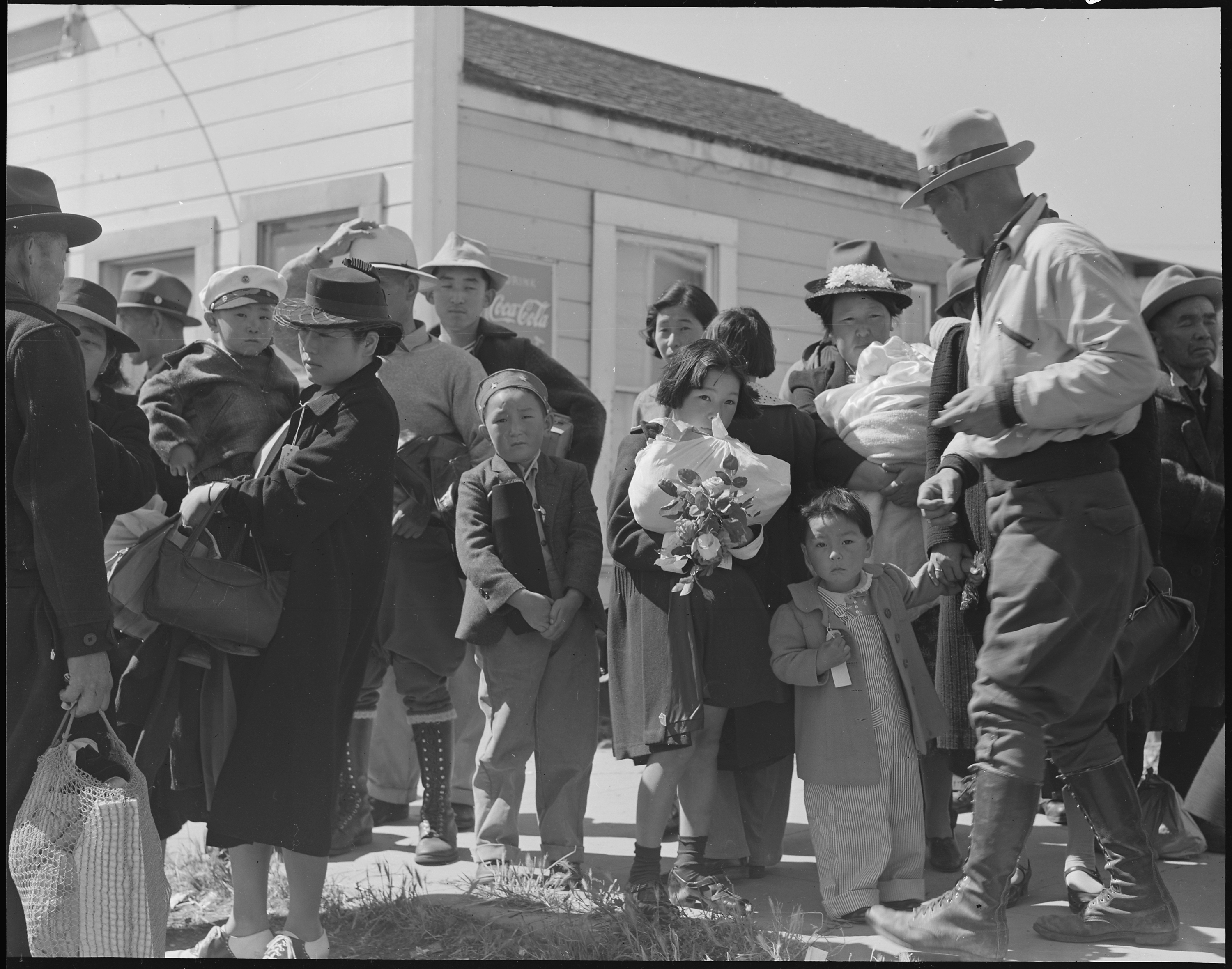
Families of Japanese ancestry arrived at the Turlock Assembly Center.

The fair was suspended during the war years, grounds were used as an assembly center for people of Japanese Ancestry for 4 months, the remainder of the war time it was used as an army rehabilitation center

- Date of first arrival to Turlock Assembly Center 4/30/42, date of last departure 8/12/42, Primary Destination Gila River Camp in Arizona which was open for 3 years

The relocation itself was ordered by the then President of the United States, Franklin D. Roosevelt, and by an act of Congress. The Japanese-American (Nisei) and the Japanese aliens (Issei) on the West Coast were rounded up and moved to assembly centers and then to relocation centers.

- Army rehabilitation center:

Captain Isidore Weiss, camp psychiatrist stated that Turlock had “restored more soldiers than perhaps half all the other RCs [Rehabilitation Centers] put together! …A number received good ratings; some made the supreme sacrifice in various theatres of war; a few were decorated for valor.” “But most important of all was the less exciting but more significant contribution toward salvaging manpower during the critical war emergency. By this means a few thousand young men were remodeled into better soldiers and citizens…It is therefore not extravagant to state that the new but proven concept of rehabilitation of military offenders should be considered one of the major social contributions of World War II.

Two months later, in the height of war panic, President Roosevelt authorized the exclusion of Japanese Americans on the west coast to various camps in response to Japan’s attack. At this time nearly a dozen fairgrounds, including Turlock’s, were recruited to duty as Assembly Centers for receiving local Japanese Americans before they were sent to various camps. More than 3,000 people came through the Turlock Assembly Center during the 3 ½ months it was in use in 1942. The Japanese Americans who were temporarily held at the Turlock Assembly Center were memorialized with a monument earlier this year. It is with hope that anyone who passes the monument will take the time to read it, and learn about Turlock Assembly Center.

After these 3 ½ months, the Turlock Fairgrounds became an army rehabilitation center for the remaining 3 ½ years of the war. Here, troubled soldiers were rehabilitated so that they may rejoin the ranks as fully functioning soldiers. During this time, approximately 10,000 soldiers came through this center. America’s entrance into World War II prompted the drafting of men to fill the military’s soldier needs as soon as possible. Unfortunately, some of these men had difficulty in adapting to military life, leading to outbreaks of AWOL (Absent Without Leave) and insubordinate soldiers. A center was needed to “rehabilitate” these men and return them to duty. This was accomplished with additional basic training as well as a camp psychiatrist and sociologist.

- 1945 – additional land was purchased
- 1946*

August 5–11, Fair purchased additional 21 acres from the federal government, 46,555 attendees, Fair facilities now became available year-round

- 1947*

August 12–14, 1950s

Clyde (C.A.) Rigsbee was appointed Fair Manager and maintained this position until his death in 1968. In 1952 the popular Kiddie Kapers Parade was held for the last time, discontinued due to lack of leadership interest. The grandstands in the arena were constructed in 1953. The present name, Stanislaus County Fair, was officially used for the first time in 1956. In 1957 a Roller Rink opened in the Arts and Crafts Building. The 1959 Fair featured a Hawaiian theme in honor of the new state, entertainers were flown in directly from Hawaii for special performances.

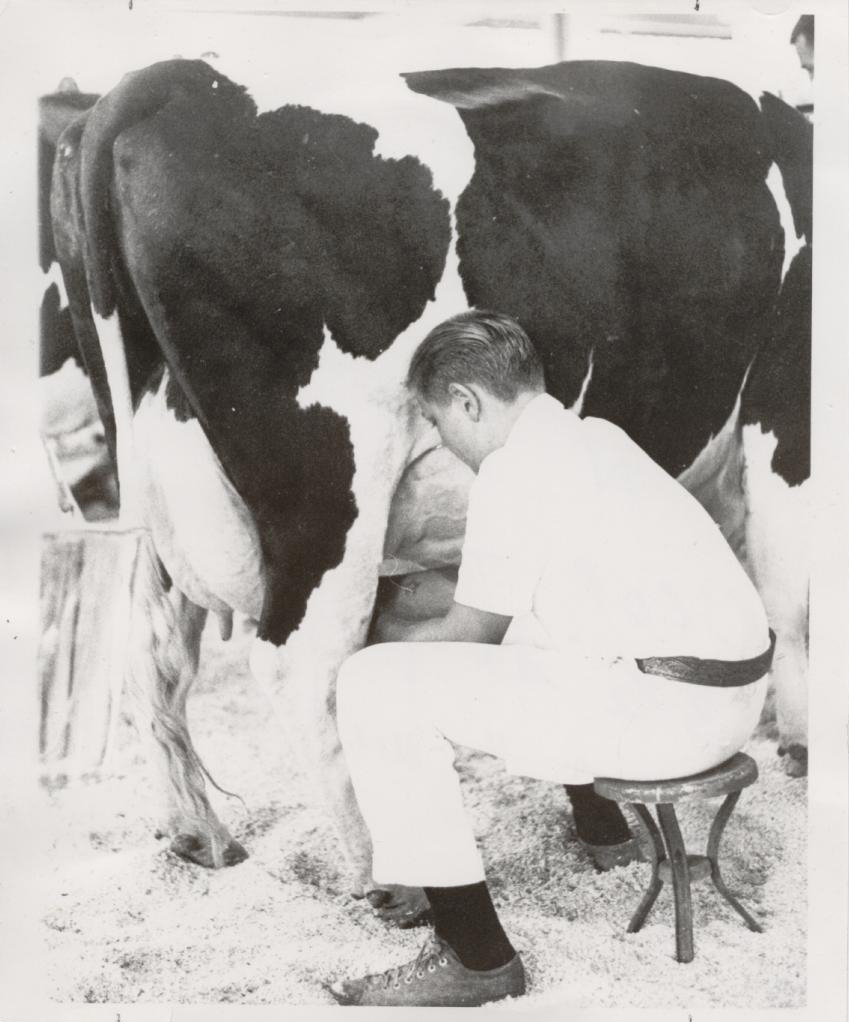
A 4-H member milks his cow, 1954.

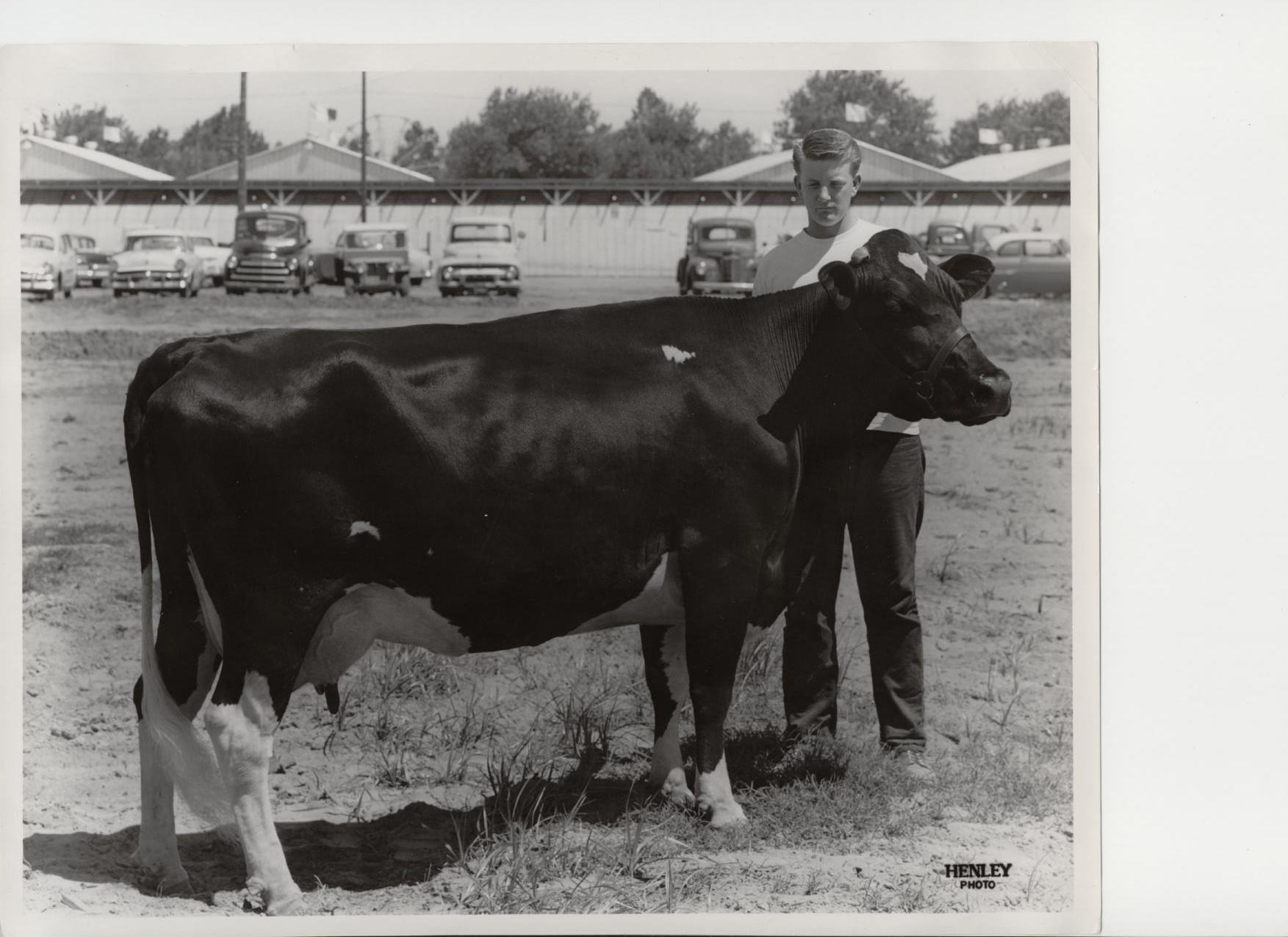
Exhibitor with cow

- 1960s*

Classes for the newly established Stanislaus State College began on the Stanislaus County Fairgrounds in September, 1960. The college moved to its current location five years later, and was awarded university status.

In 1960, The Floriculture building was completed.

1965, the first livestock auction was held to replace the Oakdale Fat Stock Sale.

1968, the first woman appointed to Board of Directors, Patricia Gaard and the first replacement heifer sale was staged. 1964 Long-time Fair manager Clyde Rigsbee died, John Lovel took over the reins as Fair manager at this time.

- 1970s*

The fair expanded to seven days in 1975. 1970, August 3–8 1971, 119,454 (August 2–7) 1974, Adult admission $1, Children 6-12 $0.50 1975, Fair adds another day, becoming a 7-day event

- 1980s*

The fair expanded to nine days in 1981. The 1984 Fair featured such acts as Paul Revere & The Raiders with Adult admission being $2 and Child admission $.50.

In 1989, a Fair attendance record was made when 261,089 persons attended – this record is still undefeated.

- 1990s*

The Fair expanded to its current 10-day length by 1994. In 1999 The Stanislaus County Fair Board of Directors with support of the Turlock American Legion resolved that the Stanislaus County Fair Arch Gate be recognized as a California State Point of Historical Interest. A marker was unveiled during an opening night ceremony during the 1999 Fair and is on public view just inside the historic Arch Gate.

- 2010s*

Prior to the 2010 Fair, a dedication ceremony honoring the Japanese Americans involved in the Turlock Assembly Center of 1941 was held and a memorial was erected near the Floriculture building.

There have been many uses made of the Fairground facilities all year round for a near 100 years now including the temporary campus of the California State University Stanislaus. With humble beginnings as a 7-acre location, it has grown over 10 times that size into a 72-acre grounds.

- 2020s*

With 2020 being canceled for the first time in 75 years, the 103rd was deferred to 2021.

Annual attendance - past 10 years*

2020 – 0
2015 - 249,000+
2012 – 221,000+
2011 – 245,000+
2010 – 224,382

== Recent fairs ==
- 2021

The fair returned following last year's hiatus caused by COVID-19 pandemic, with strict measures.

- 2013

The 102nd Stanislaus County Fair ran from July 12 to July 21, 2013. The free concert performances on the Budweiser Stage included Friday July 12 - Clay Walker, Weird Al Yankovic, Creedence Clearwater Revisited, 38 Special, Hinder, Huey Lewis and The News, Tower of Power, Morris Day & the Time, and Gloriana

- 2012

The 101st Stanislaus County Fair ran from July 13 to July 22, 2012. The free concert performances included Foreigner, Kellie Pickler, The Wiggles, Peking Acrobats of Beijing, Bret Michaels, LeAnn Rimes, and Diego Verdaguer & Amanda Miguel. This year introduced its newest brand theme “Imagine the Fun!”

Kids Club

The Stanislaus County Fair began its award-winning Kids Club Educational Program (formally known as Kidz Club), which offers both children and parents the educational opportunity to learn more about the Fair's rich agricultural heritage and tradition that is unique to the Central Valley.

- 2011

The centennial Stanislaus County Fair ran from July 15 to July 24, 2011. The free concert performances included Clint Black, Boyz II Men, America, MercyMe, Clay Walker, Big Time Rush, Bob & Time Comedy All-Stars, Joan Jett & The Blackhearts, Joe Nicols & Heidi Newfield, La Original Banda el Limon de Salvador Lizarraga. The Fair celebrated with a fair theme of "100 Years of Fair Fun", which started featured a centennial exhibit which contained 100 years of fair history and fun. The Fair also sold over 40 of the once-in-a-lifetime 100-Year Pass, good for 100 years of Fair admission.

- 2010

The 99th Stanislaus County Fair ran from July 16 to July 25, 2010. The free concert performances included WAR, KC & The Sunshine Band, Bill Engvall, Natalie Grant and Tenth Avenue North, The Beach Boys, Jack Ingram and Chuck Wicks, Boys Like Girls, Blake Shelton, Terri Clark, Los Tucanes. The Fair theme was "Flavors of the Valley" which focused on our local valley food processors and manufacturers. There was exhibit on the fairgrounds that showcased some of the processor and manufacturers by providing taste tests for visitors to the exhibit.

- 2009

The 98th Stanislaus County Fair ran from July 31 to August 9, 2009. The free concert performances included Grand Funk Railroad, Mark Chesnutt and Trailer Choir, The Four Tops, newsboys, Rick Springfield, Gretchen Wilson, Nat & Alex Wolff, Josh Turner, Huey Lewis and the News, and Pablo Montero plus Noelia. The Fair theme was “Renewable Fun” which focused on staying eco-friendly and making a difference in creating a better, cleaner earth. There was an area on the fairgrounds that was dedicated to local organizations to offer tips on how to live “green” lifestyle called the “Clean & Green Expo”.

Rainforest Adventure

New to 2009 was the interactive and educational Rainforest Adventure exhibit. The exhibit was 8,000 square feet (740 m^{2}) filled with animals that inhabit a real rainforest. There were toucans, anacondas, snapping turtles, sloths, porcupines and many other animals. Along with animal life there was plant life growing from the ground to the canopy.

Park ‘N Ride

A new program was implemented in 2009, the Park ‘N Ride shuttle service. Fair guests could park at either California State University Stanislaus or Pitman High School and ride free to and from the Stanislaus County Fair’s arch gate entrance. The shuttle ran all 10 days of the Fair from 4:30 until 11 p.m.

- 2008

The 97th Stanislaus County Fair ran from July 25 to August 3. The free concert performances included Clay Walker, Bowling For Soup, Sawyer Brown, Building 429 and Mathew West, Little Big Town, The Doobie Brothers, Raven-Symoné, The Beach Boys, The Temptations and Mariachi Vargas. The Budweiser Clydesdales were part of a parade through the fairgrounds and performed a show in the FoodMaxx Arena. Jurassic Journey was part of the Kids Zone. The exhibit featured 40 individual, full-size replicas of dinosaurs, ice-age mammal and fossils. The Fair theme was “Nuts Are Dino-Mite.”

- 2007

The 96th Stanislaus County Fair ran from July 27 to August 5. The free concert performances included Three Dog Night, LeAnn Rimes, Tanya Tucker and The Bellamy Brothers, Mark Schultz and Big Daddy Weave, Triple Threat Tour: Restless Heart, Blackhawk and Little Texas, Blake Shelton, Reo Speedwagon, The Guess Who, Adbacadabra, and Ana Bárbara. The Kids Zone included the Wildlife Experience Show and pigs from Ham Bone Express. The pigs raced around a track against each other. The Fair theme was “Summer Safari.”

== Turf Club ==
The Turlock Turf Club is located on the Stanislaus County Fairgrounds. All races are broadcast live via satellite. There are up to six tracks per day that are shown featuring races from selected county fairs every June through October. The Turf Club also broadcasts races year round from tracks across the United States.

== Awards ==
- 2012

The Stanislaus County Fair received 14 Western Fairs Association (WFA) Achievement Awards, of which six were 1st place wins in “Website,” “Magazine Ad,” “Any Other Printed Piece” in reference to the Turlock Living Magazine Fair Special, “New Featured Event/Exhibit or Program” for the “Everybody Walk” campaign with Kaiser Permanente, “New Children’s Program” for the Kids (née z) Club Educational Program and “New Community Outreach Program” for Christmas in July with The Salvation Army. The Fair also earned several 2nd place wins in “Viral or Video Documentation” for the flashmob video of a marriage proposal, “Sponsorship” with Yonan's Jewelers and Yonan's Floral, “E-blasts,” “Fairtime Innovative Marketing Strategy/Concept” for its new brand image: Imagine the fun! and a 3rd place win in “Fair Program/Schedule.”

- 2011

The Fair received four 1st place awards from the Western Fair Association Achievement Awards in the categories of “Our Best New Idea This Year, Marketing,” “Social Media Campaign,” Community Outreach Program,” and “Printed Competitive Exhibit Handbook;” also placing 2nd in “Pamphlets, Brochures Flyer & Direct Mail,” “Fair Programs/Schedule,” “Overall Children’s Program” and 3rd in “Outdoor Advertising.”

- 2010

The Fair received three awards from the WFA, a 1st place award for their "Social Media Campaign," a 2nd place award for "Pamphlets, Brochures, Flyers and Direct Mail" and a 3rd place award for "Outdoor Advertising."

- 2009

The Fair's Company Picnics Program was awarded 1st place by WFA in the "Non-Traditional Revenue Generating Program" category.

- 2008

WFA presented The Fair with a 1st place award for "Best Overall Children’s Program."

== See also ==
- Ballico Auxiliary Field
- California Historical Landmarks in Stanislaus County, California
