= Old Adobe Barn =

Historic barn in La Grange, California, United States

- U.S. National Register of Historic Places
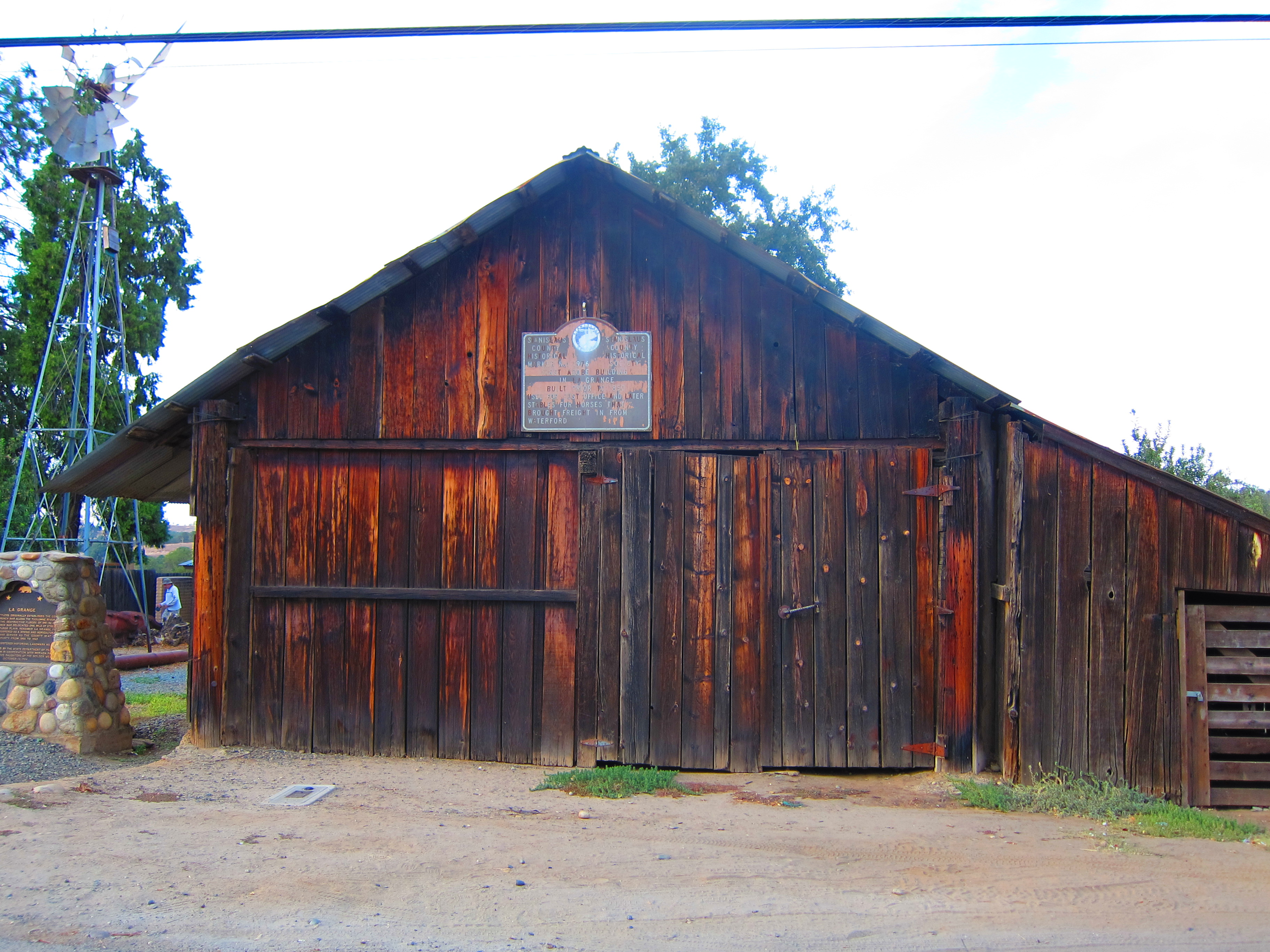

- Location within California Location within the United States
- Location: Yosemite Blvd. and La Grange Rd., La Grange, California
- Coordinates: 37°39′50″N 120°27′34″W
- Area: 0.5 acres (0.20 ha)
- Built: c. 1840s
- MPS: La Grange MRA
- NRHP reference No.: 79003462
- Added to NRHP: August 24, 1979

Old Adobe Barn, also known as Adobe Post Office, is a historic barn in La Grange, California, United States. It is the oldest building in the town being built prior to 1850 by the first French settlers in the area. It was used as a post office. The barn is made of adobe bricks on the side walls, and of wooden planks on the southern facade.
