= Riverbank, California =

City in California, United States

- City
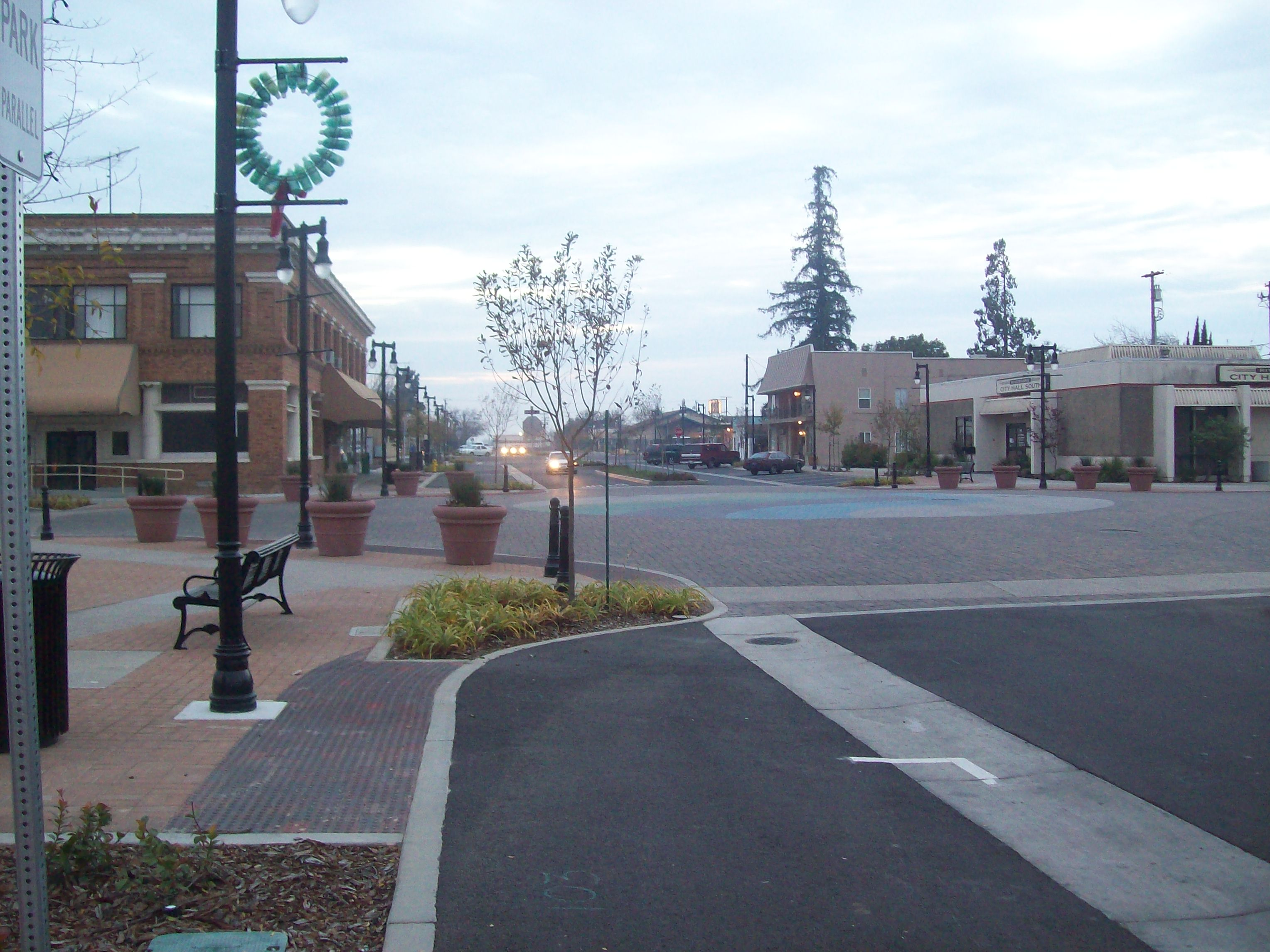
- Downtown Riverbank (Third Street)

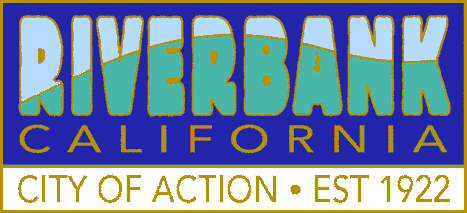
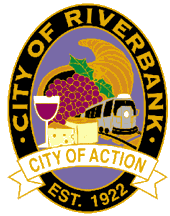
- Flag Seal
- Motto: City of Action
- Interactive map of Riverbank, California
- Location in the United States
- Coordinates: 37°43′53″N 120°56′37″W
- Country: United States
- State: California
- County: Stanislaus
- Incorporated: August 23, 1922

Government
  - Type: City
  - Mayor: Rachel Hernandez

Area
  - Total: 4.74 sq mi (12.27 km^{2})
  - Land: 4.71 sq mi (12.20 km^{2})
  - Water: 0.027 sq mi (0.07 km^{2}) 0.56%
- Elevation: 141 ft (43 m)

Population (2020)
  - Total: 24,865
  - Density: 5,279/sq mi (2,038/km^{2})
- Time zone: UTC-8 (Pacific (PST))
  - Summer (DST): UTC-7 (PDT)
- ZIP code: 95367
- Area code: 209
- FIPS code: 06-61068
- GNIS feature ID: 1659518
- Website: www.riverbank.org

Riverbank is a city in Stanislaus County, California, United States. The population was 24,865 at the 2020 census, up from 22,678 at the 2010 census. Incorporated on August 23, 1922, Riverbank's official slogan is "City of Action." It is part of the Modesto metropolitan area.

== History ==
Riverbank was founded as a ferry crossing, and was established as a town with the coming of the San Francisco and San Joaquin Valley Railroad, which was soon acquired by the Santa Fe Railroad. It is named for its location on the Stanislaus River.

In the 1850s, the Riverbank area was known as Burneyville. Major James Burney, sheriff of Mariposa, established the Burneyville Ferry over the Stanislaus River at the site of the modern bridge in Riverbank.

In 2026, a proposal to annex 1,500 acres (610 ha) was opposed by many residents.

== Geography ==
According to the United States Census Bureau, the city has a total area of 4.7 square miles (12.3 km^{2}), of which 4.7 square miles (12.2 km^{2}) is land and 0.27 square miles (0.7 km^{2}) (0.56%) is water. Riverbank also includes a park called Jacob Myers. Jacob Myers Park is the largest park in Riverbank, California. It includes public access to the Stanislaus River.

== Demographics ==
Historical population
Census	Pop.	Note	%±
1930	803		—
1940	1,130		40.7%
1950	2,662		135.6%
1960	2,786		4.7%
1970	3,949		41.7%
1980	5,695		44.2%
1990	8,547		50.1%
2000	15,826		85.2%
2010	22,678		43.3%
2020	24,865		9.6%
U.S. Decennial Census

=== 2020 census ===
As of the 2020 census, Riverbank had a population of 24,865. The median age was 34.3 years. 28.1% of residents were under the age of 18 and 11.5% of residents were 65 years of age or older. For every 100 females there were 96.7 males, and for every 100 females age 18 and over there were 94.5 males age 18 and over.

99.8% of residents lived in urban areas, while 0.2% lived in rural areas.

There were 7,312 households in Riverbank, of which 47.8% had children under the age of 18 living in them. Of all households, 57.9% were married-couple households, 13.3% were households with a male householder and no spouse or partner present, and 21.9% were households with a female householder and no spouse or partner present. About 13.9% of all households were made up of individuals and 6.4% had someone living alone who was 65 years of age or older.

There were 7,493 housing units, of which 2.4% were vacant. The homeowner vacancy rate was 0.7% and the rental vacancy rate was 3.1%.

Racial composition as of the 2020 census
Race	Number	Percent
White	10,917	43.9%
Black or African American	530	2.1%
American Indian and Alaska Native	491	2.0%
Asian	1,256	5.1%
Native Hawaiian and Other Pacific Islander	156	0.6%
Some other race	7,143	28.7%
Two or more races	4,372	17.6%
Hispanic or Latino (of any race)	13,958	56.1%

=== 2000 census ===
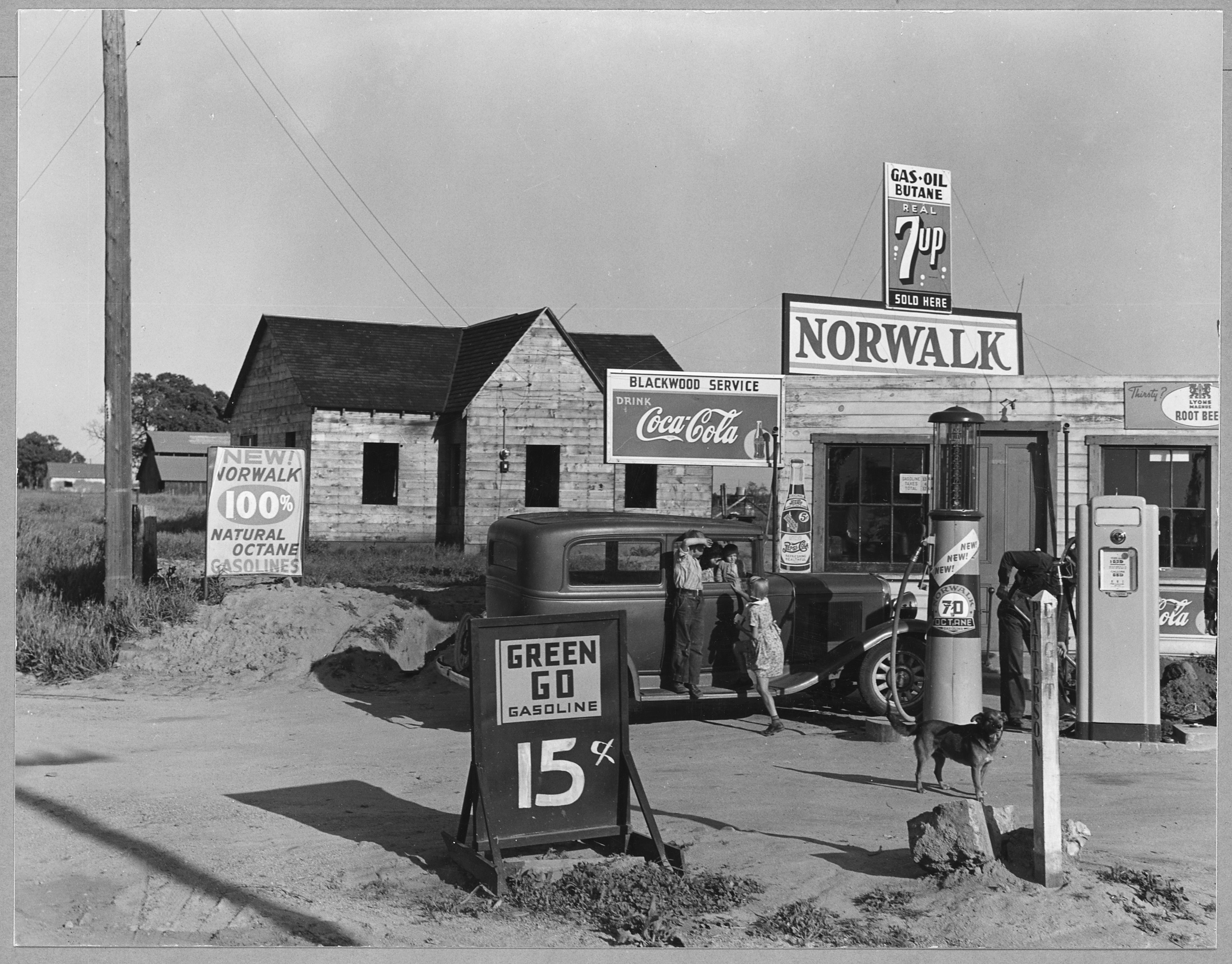
Store and gas station in Riverbank, 1940. Photo by Dorothea Lange.

At the 2000 census there were 15,826 people in 4,544 households, including 3,821 families, in the city. The population density was 5,091.7 inhabitants per square mile (1,965.9/km^{2}). There were 4,698 housing units at an average density of 1,511.5 per square mile (583.6/km^{2}). The racial makeup of the city was 66.85% White, 1.53% African American, 1.43% Native American, 1.31% Asian, 0.13% Pacific Islander, 24.03% from other races, and 4.72% from two or more races. Hispanic or Latino of any race were 45.91%.

Of the 4,544 households 49.6% had children under the age of 18 living with them, 65.0% were married couples living together, 13.2% had a female householder with no husband present, and 15.9% were non-families. 11.9% of households were one person and 4.2% were one person aged 65 or older. The average household size was 3.45 and the average family size was 3.73.

The age distribution was 33.9% under the age of 18, 9.9% from 18 to 24, 30.8% from 25 to 44, 18.2% from 45 to 64, and 7.2% 65 or older. The median age was 30 years. For every 100 females, there were 97.4 males. For every 100 females age 18 and over, there were 95.1 males.

The median income for a household in the city was $44,668, and the median family income was $47,411. Males had a median income of $36,370 versus $29,012 for females. The per capita income for the city was $14,972. About 9.3% of families and 12.3% of the population were below the poverty line, including 14.8% of those under age 18 and 4.9% of those age 65 or over.

The California State Department of Finance estimates the population of Riverbank as of January 1, 2006, to be 21,215 people, an estimated 34.1% increase since 2000.

== Arts and culture ==
The Riverbank Branch Library is listed on the National Register of Historic Places.

The Riverbank Cheese and Wine Festival is an annual event each October, featuring wine and cheese tasting, arts and crafts, and vendors.

Riverbank's downtown was remodeled in 2009. New attractions include a downtown plaza with a mural and statue of a cable ferry operator.

== Government ==
In the California State Legislature, Riverbank is in the 4th senatorial district, represented by Republican Marie Alvarado-Gil, and the 9th Assembly district, represented by Republican Heath Flora.

In the United States House of Representatives, Riverbank is in California's 5th congressional district, represented by Republican Tom McClintock.

== Education ==
=== Elementary schools ===
- California Avenue Elementary School
- Crossroads Elementary School
- Mesa Verde Elementary School

=== Middle schools ===
- Cardozo Middle School

=== High schools ===
- Riverbank High School

=== Other schools ===
- Riverbank Language Academy

== Infrastructure ==
=== Transportation ===
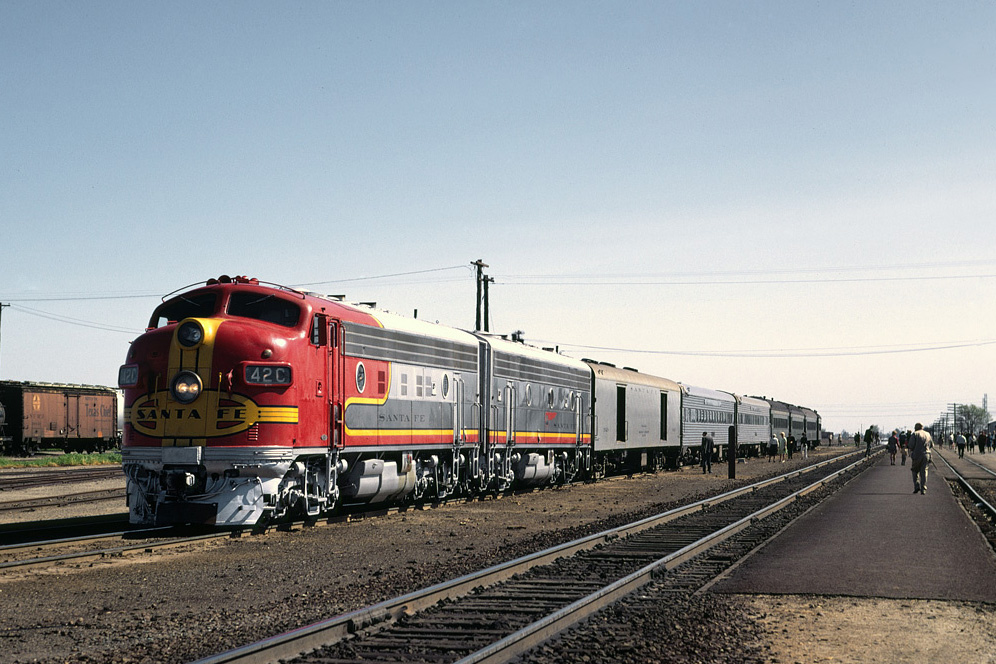
Atchison, Topeka and Santa Fe Railway locomotive in Riverbank

The BNSF Railway has a mainline running through Riverbank and serves as the BNSF's principal line linking Northern California with the Los Angeles-Chicago mainline. The line used to be owned by the Santa Fe Railway (ATSF).

Amtrak had a station in Riverbank which also served nearby Modesto, California; it was replaced by Modesto station on November 1, 1999, and was destroyed by fire in 2005.

The Stanislaus Regional Transit Authority operates one bus route in Riverside.

=== Public safety ===
The Stanislaus County Sheriff's Department provides police services to the city.

== Notable people ==
- Oscar Zeta Acosta - attorney, politician, novelist and Chicano Movement activist.
- German Fernandez - American professional runner.

== Sister cities ==
City	State/Province	Country	Population
Fuyang	Zhejiang	China	659,000
Tamazula de Gordiano	Jalisco	Mexico	41,121
Fürstenfeld	Styria	Austria	5,986
