= Empire City (California) =

Former town; California historic landmark

Coordinates: 37°37′23″N 120°53′49″W

The Empire City Historic Landmark is a California Historic Landmark in honor of the pioneer John C. Marvin who from 1850, settled on the south bank of the Tuolumne River and called the town "Empire City". Empire City was the head of navigation for small steamboats that could ascend the Tuolumne River carrying passengers and supplies. It was the shipping point for the large grain crops grown in the area. At its height, the town had three stores, a three-story hotel, two boarding houses, a blacksmith shop, a church, and a school house. Empire City was voted as the county seat of Stanislaus County from October 1854 to December 1855. The town was destroyed by flood waters during the Great Flood of 1862. A new railroad town was built 40 years later 1 mile north of the old town site, taking the name Empire.

== The site today ==
The state's historical marker is located in Empire and was relocated from Santa Fe Avenue to the new Empire Community Park.

Another historical marker for Empire City was erected on October 28, 1961, by Estanislao Chapter 58 of E Clampus Vitus (# 418), also in Empire Community Park, at the eastern end of the parking area.
