= St. Louis Catholic Church (La Grange, California) =

Historic church in California, United States

- U.S. National Register of Historic Places
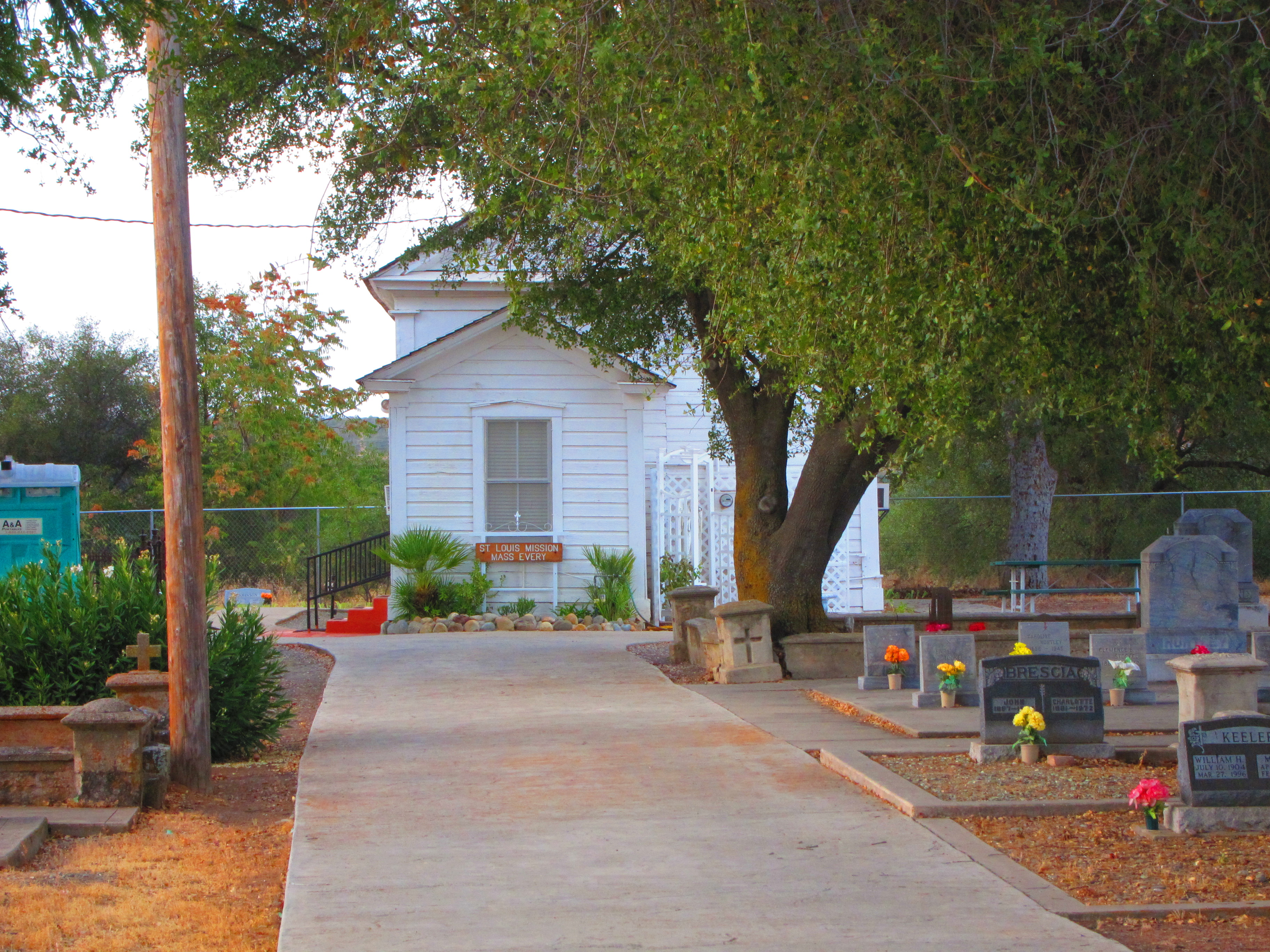

- Location within California Location within the United States
- Location: 30201 Floto St., La Grange, California
- Coordinates: 37°39′46″N 120°27′39″W
- Area: less than one acre
- Built: 1854
- Architectural style: Vernacular Greek Revival
- MPS: La Grange MRA
- NRHP reference No.: 79003460
- Added to NRHP: August 24, 1979

The St. Louis Catholic Church is a historic church in La Grange, California, United States. It was added to the National Register of Historic Places in 1979.

The church, built in 1854, is the oldest in Stanislaus County. Its California historic resources review states "Architecturally it is significant as a vernacular Greek Revival structure, and remains as evidence of a style which dotted the towns and hillsides of Gold Rush California."
