= Empire, California =

Empire
- Unincorporated Community; Census Designated Place
- Location in Stanislaus County and the state of California
- Coordinates: 37°38′39″N 120°54′27″W
- Country: United States
- State: California
- County: Stanislaus
- Empire City: 1850
- Empire: 1896

Area
  - Total: 1.168 sq mi (3.026 km^{2})
  - Land: 1.168 sq mi (3.026 km^{2})
  - Water: 0 sq mi (0 km^{2}) 0%
- Elevation: 118 ft (36 m)

Population (2020)
  - Total: 4,202
  - Density: 3,597/sq mi (1,389/km^{2})
- Time zone: UTC-8 (Pacific (PST))
  - Summer (DST): UTC-7 (PDT)
- ZIP code: 95319
- Area code: 209
- FIPS code: 06-22622
- GNIS feature ID: 1658501

Empire is a census-designated place (CDP) in Stanislaus County, California, United States. The population was 4,202 at the 2020 census, up from 4,189 at the 2010 census. It is part of the Modesto Metropolitan Statistical Area. Empire is agriculturally active, and is home to the new Empire Community Park.

== History ==
In 1854, the town of Empire City was founded on the south bank of the Tuolumne River, one mile south of present-day Empire. It was reputedly named after New York City, the "Empire City". However, some sources indicate that the town was founded as early as 1850. The town shows on the 1852 Gibbes map as Empire. It is alleged to have been almost destroyed and deserted twice, in 1852 and 1855. The town served as the head of navigation for steamboats on the Tuolumne River. Empire City became the county seat of Stanislaus County, and was flooded in the Great Flood of 1862. In 1896, the town relocated one mile north of the river, and was renamed Empire for the Santa Fe Railroad. (Part of the San Francisco and San Joaquin Valley Railroad line which the Santa Fe acquired in 1898.)

== Downtown ==
Downtown Empire is situated in the second town layout. It includes a small post office, a Church of the Brethren church, and the Empire Community Park with the Empire City Historic Landmark.

== Geography ==
Empire is located at 37°38′39″N 120°54′27″W (37.644298, -120.907592).

According to the United States Census Bureau, the CDP has a total area of 1.2 square miles (3.1 km^{2}), all land.

=== Climate ===
According to the Köppen climate classification system, Empire has a warm-summer Mediterranean climate, Csa on climate maps.

== Demographics ==
Historical population
| Census | Pop. | Note | %± |
|---|---|---|---|
| 2000 | 3,903 | | — |
| 2010 | 4,189 | | 7.3% |
| 2020 | 4,202 | | 0.3% |
U.S. Decennial Census; 1860–1870 1880-1890; 1900 1910 1920; 1930 1940 1950; 1960 1970 1980; 1990 2000 2010

Empire first appeared as a census designated place in the 2000 U.S. census.

=== 2020 census ===
As of the 2020 census, Empire had a population of 4,202, with a population density of 3,597.6 inhabitants per square mile (1,389.0/km^{2}). Of the total population, 97.3% lived in households, 2.7% lived in non-institutionalized group quarters, and no one was institutionalized.

100.0% of residents lived in urban areas, while 0.0% lived in rural areas.

There were 1,312 households, out of which 38.1% had children under the age of 18. Of all households, 41.1% were married-couple households, 13.6% were cohabiting couple households, 24.5% had a female householder with no spouse or partner present, and 20.8% had a male householder with no spouse or partner present. 20.9% of households were one person, and 8.9% were one person aged 65 or older. The average household size was 3.12. There were 916 families (69.8% of all households).

The age distribution was 24.8% under the age of 18, 9.2% aged 18 to 24, 27.8% aged 25 to 44, 26.2% aged 45 to 64, and 11.9% who were 65 years of age or older. The median age was 36.5 years. For every 100 females, there were 107.4 males, and for every 100 females age 18 and over there were 106.1 males age 18 and over.

There were 1,345 housing units at an average density of 1,151.5 units per square mile (444.6 units/km^{2}), of which 1,312 (97.5%) were occupied. Of occupied units, 47.9% were owner-occupied and 52.1% were occupied by renters. 2.5% of housing units were vacant; the homeowner vacancy rate was 1.1% and the rental vacancy rate was 2.6%.

Racial composition as of the 2020 census
| Race | Number | Percent |
|---|---|---|
| White | 1,878 | 44.7% |
| Black or African American | 60 | 1.4% |
| American Indian and Alaska Native | 109 | 2.6% |
| Asian | 49 | 1.2% |
| Native Hawaiian and Other Pacific Islander | 18 | 0.4% |
| Some other race | 1,431 | 34.1% |
| Two or more races | 657 | 15.6% |
| Hispanic or Latino (of any race) | 2,541 | 60.5% |

=== Income and poverty ===
In 2023, the US Census Bureau estimated that the median household income was $48,990, and the per capita income was $20,817. About 25.5% of families and 28.7% of the population were below the poverty line.

=== 2010 census ===
The 2010 United States census reported that Empire had a population of 4,189. The population density was 2,679.5 inhabitants per square mile (1,034.6/km^{2}). The racial makeup of Empire was 2,274 (54.3%) White, 22 (0.5%) African American, 56 (1.3%) Native American, 59 (1.4%) Asian, 8 (0.2%) Pacific Islander, 1,500 (35.8%) from other races, and 270 (6.4%) from two or more races. Hispanic or Latino of any race were 2,275 persons (54.3%).

The Census reported that 4,037 people (96.4% of the population) lived in households, 152 (3.6%) lived in non-institutionalized group quarters, and 0 (0%) were institutionalized.

There were 1,215 households, out of which 570 (46.9%) had children under the age of 18 living in them, 585 (48.1%) were opposite-sex married couples living together, 244 (20.1%) had a female householder with no husband present, 103 (8.5%) had a male householder with no wife present. There were 98 (8.1%) unmarried opposite-sex partnerships, and 11 (0.9%) same-sex married couples or partnerships. 204 households (16.8%) were made up of individuals, and 71 (5.8%) had someone living alone who was 65 years of age or older. The average household size was 3.32. There were 932 families (76.7% of all households); the average family size was 3.74.

The population was spread out, with 1,227 people (29.3%) under the age of 18, 428 people (10.2%) aged 18 to 24, 1,097 people (26.2%) aged 25 to 44, 1,024 people (24.4%) aged 45 to 64, and 413 people (9.9%) who were 65 years of age or older. The median age was 32.8 years. For every 100 females, there were 100.7 males. For every 100 females age 18 and over, there were 96.0 males.

There were 1,328 housing units at an average density of 849.5 units per square mile (328.0 units/km^{2}), of which 724 (59.6%) were owner-occupied, and 491 (40.4%) were occupied by renters. The homeowner vacancy rate was 2.0%; the rental vacancy rate was 10.5%. 2,375 people (56.7% of the population) lived in owner-occupied housing units and 1,662 people (39.7%) lived in rental housing units.

== Government ==
The Empire Municipal Advisory Council is the town's council, along with the library, sheriff's office, and health center, it receives help from Stanislaus County.

In the California State Legislature, Empire is in the 4th senatorial district, represented by Republican Marie Alvarado-Gil, and in the 22nd Assembly district, represented by Republican Juan Alanis.

In the United States House of Representatives, Empire is in California's 13th Congressional District, represented by Congressman Adam Gray.
