= La Grange, California =

Unincorporated community and CDP in California, United States

La Grange French Bar
- Unincorporated community and census-designated place
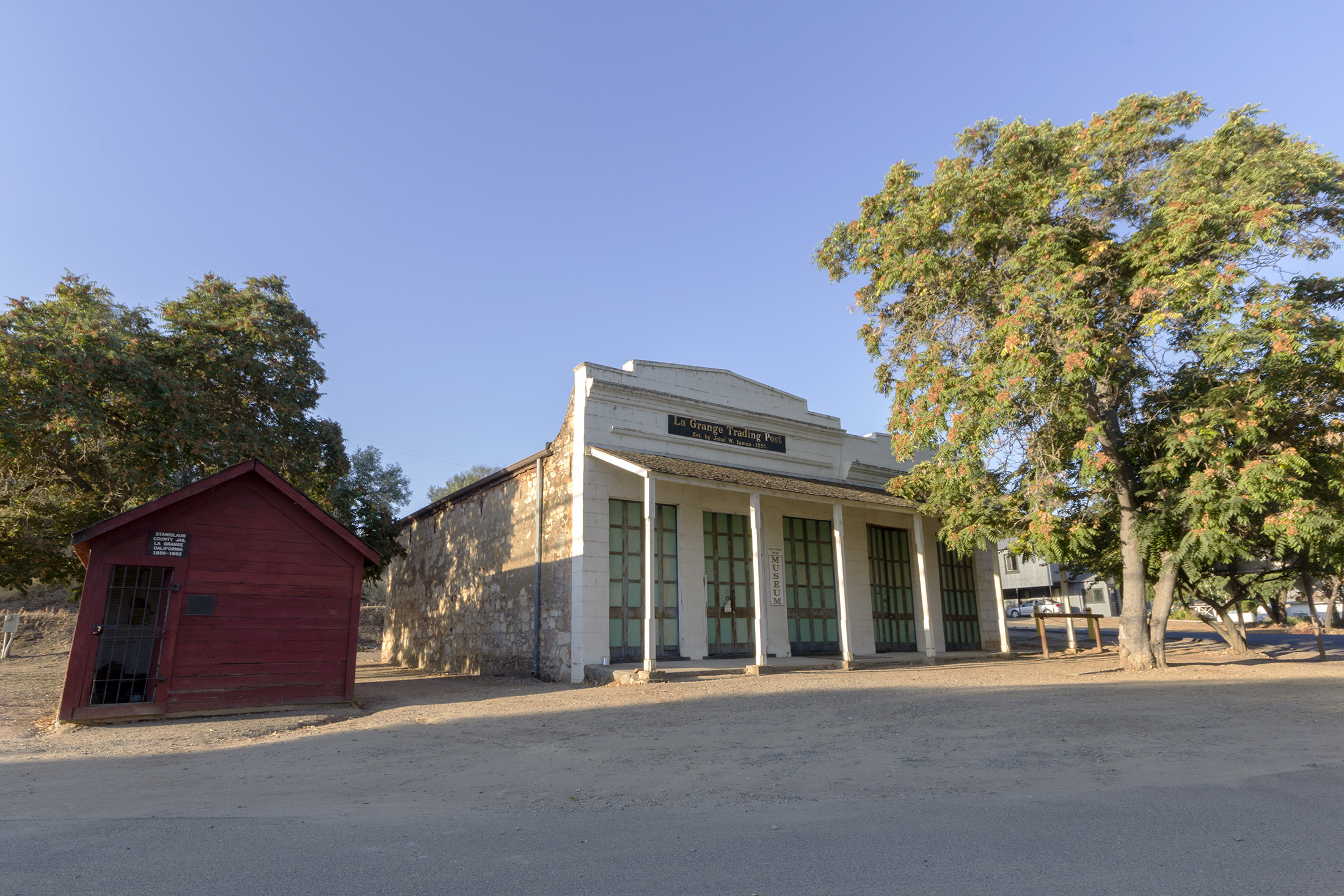
- Stage stop in La Grange Historic District.

- Location within California Location within the United States
- Coordinates: 37°39′49″N 120°27′49″W
- Country: United States
- State: California
- County: Stanislaus County

Area
  - Total: 0.093 sq mi (0.24 km^{2})
  - Land: 0.093 sq mi (0.24 km^{2})
  - Water: 0 sq mi (0 km^{2})
- Elevation: 259 ft (79 m)

Population (2020)
  - Total: 166
  - Density: 1,800/sq mi (690/km^{2})
- Time zone: UTC-8 (Pacific)
  - Summer (DST): UTC-7 (PDT)
- ZIP Code: 95329
- Area codes: 209/350
- GNIS feature ID: 226726

California Historical Landmark
- Reference no.: 414

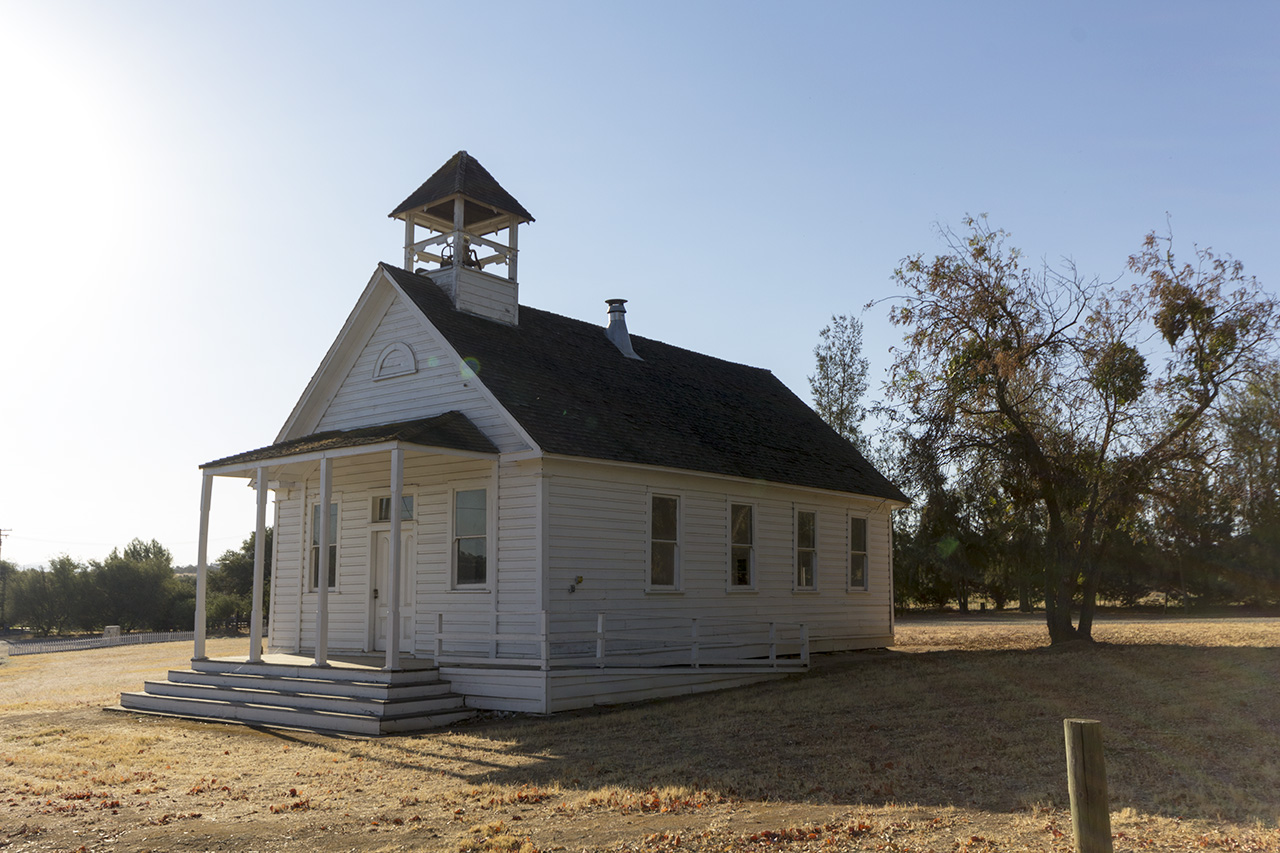
The "old" Schoolhouse in the La Grange Historic District.

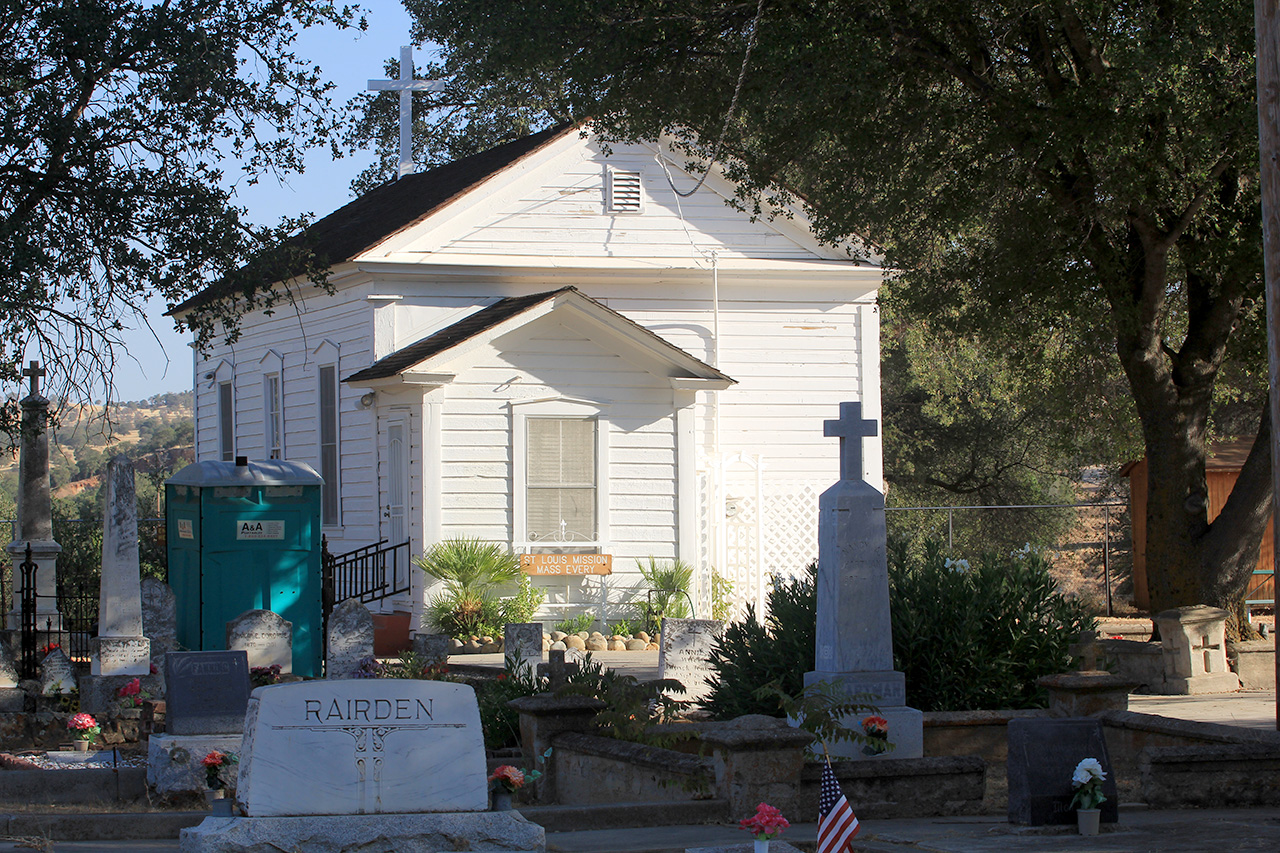
The St. Louis Roman Catholic Church and cemetery.

La Grange is an unincorporated community and census-designated place (CDP) in Stanislaus County, California, United States. As of the 2020 United States census, the population was 166.

== Geography ==
La Grange sits at an elevation of 259 feet (79 m) along the Tuolumne River, near the La Grange Dam and the New Don Pedro Dam.

== History ==
The name is French and means "the barn" or "the farm". The community and a French settlement nearby were also called "French Bar". The community was founded in 1852 around the same time French miners struck gold on a bar in the Tuolumne River. By 1854, there were over 100 buildings in La Grange.

La Grange became the county seat of Stanislaus County in 1856. Aside from its French population, the community included a significant Chinatown in its early years. At its height, the community had thousands of residents, but it was a largely lawless town. It was in decline by the time that Knights Ferry became the county seat, as the gold mines were in decline. By 1880, mining had ceased. The La Grange area also included many gold dredgers that operated until the early 1950s.

On June 3, 1869, John Muir departed La Grange with a shepherd and a flock of sheep, heading for the headwaters of the Merced and Tuolumne rivers. He recorded the journey in My First Summer in the Sierra (1911), describing the ranch near French Bar "on the south side of the Tuolumne River...where the foothills of metamorphic gold-bearing slates dip below the stratified deposits of the Central Valley."

=== Historic district ===
La Grange is a registered California Historical Landmark historic district. A post office, a supermarket, and Don Pedro High School still operate in La Grange. The former La Grange Elementary School closed in 2015. Also functioning is the oldest church in Stanislaus County, St. Louis Roman Catholic Church, with a cemetery containing tombstones dating to the mid-1800s.

== Demographics ==
Historical population
Census	Pop.	Note	%±
2020	166		—
U.S. Decennial Census; 1850–1870 1880–1890; 1900 1910 1920; 1930 1940 1950; 1960 1970 1980; 1990 2000 2010; 2020

La Grange first appeared as a census-designated place in the 2020 United States census.

=== 2020 census ===
La Grange CDP, California – Racial and ethnic composition Note: the US Census treats Hispanic/Latino as an ethnic category. This table excludes Latinos from the racial categories and assigns them to a separate category. Hispanics/Latinos may be of any race.
Race / Ethnicity (NH = Non-Hispanic)	Pop 2020	% 2020
White alone (NH)	90	54.22%
Black or African American alone (NH)	1	0.60%
Native American or Alaska Native alone (NH)	11	6.63%
Asian alone (NH)	3	1.81%
Pacific Islander alone (NH)	0	0.00%
Other race alone (NH)	0	0.00%
Mixed race or Multiracial (NH)	10	6.02%
Hispanic or Latino (any race)	51	30.72%
Total	166	100.00%

== See also ==
- California Historical Landmarks in Stanislaus County, California
- Modesto metropolitan area
