= California county routes in zone E =

- Example of a California county route shield

Highway names
- County: County Route X (CR X) or Route X

System links
- County routes in California

There are 21 routes assigned to the "E" zone of the California Route Marker Program, which designates county routes in California. The "E" zone includes county highways in Alpine, Amador, Butte, Calaveras, El Dorado, Placer, Plumas, Sacramento, Solano, Tuolumne, Yolo, and Yuba counties.

== E1 ==
County Road E1
- Location: Grover Hot Springs State Park–Markleeville
- Length: 3.91 mi (6.29 km)
- Existed: 1962–present

County Route E1 (CR E1), known as Hot Springs Road and Montgomery Street, is a county highway in Alpine County, California, United States. It runs from Grover Hot Springs State Park to State Route 89 in Markleeville. It is the only signed county route in Alpine County.

Major intersections

The entire route is in Alpine County.

Location	mi	km	Destinations	Notes
Grover Hot Springs State Park	0.0	0.0	Western terminus	
Markleeville	3.8	6.1	Laramie Street / Montgomery Street	East end of Hot Springs Road; west end of Montgomery Street on CR E1
Markleeville	3.9	6.3	SR 89	Eastern terminus
1.000 mi = 1.609 km; 1.000 km = 0.621 mi

== E2 ==
County Road E2
- Location: Sacramento and Placer counties
- Length: 28.89 mi (46.49 km)
- Existed: 1967–present

County Route E2 (CR E2) is a county highway in Sacramento and Placer counties in the U.S. state of California. It is a major north–south arterial thoroughfare running from State Route 99 in Elk Grove to Interstate 80 in Roseville. The route is known as Grant Line Road, Sunrise Boulevard, Sunrise Avenue and a small portion of Douglas Boulevard.

The Grant Line Road portion of the route is part of the Capital SouthEast Connector project, a planned 34-mile (55 km) expressway that will run from Interstate 5 at the Hood-Franklin Road interchange just south of Elk Grove to US 50 at the White Rock Road / Silva Valley Parkway interchange in El Dorado Hills. The CR E2 portion between SR 99 and Bradshaw Road have already been upgraded, while the portion between Bradshaw and Sunrise Boulevard remains a two-lane roadway and are in the planning stages of being upgraded.

Route description

County Route E2 begins as Grant Line Road at the interchange with State Route 99. It heads northeast on a four to six-lane roadway, reducing to a rural two-lane roadway just past Bradshaw Road, skirting the city limits of Elk Grove to the west. The route then turns north onto Sunrise Boulevard, where it remains a two-lane roadway, intersecting State Route 16 (also known as Jackson Road). CR E2 enters the city of Rancho Cordova and dramatically widens to five lanes near the intersection of Kiefer Boulevard. This stretch of roadway was widened between Kiefer Boulevard and Douglas Road to accommodate increasing traffic to the surrounding housing development. After CR E2 gains a sixth lane, the route turns northwest just after Douglas Road and then turns north again approaching White Rock Road. It approaches U.S. Route 50 at an interchange, then skirting the community of Gold River to the east. The route leaves Rancho Cordova, crossing the American River and into the community of Fair Oaks. It enters the city of Citrus Heights after Madison Avenue and into the Sunrise MarketPlace, the city's shopping district. After passing Sunrise Mall and its intersection with Greenback Lane (County Route E14), the route is reduced to four lanes. It remains four lanes for the remainder of the route, passing Antelope Road, and entering Placer County and the city of Roseville. The route becomes Sunrise Avenue at the county line for a few miles, turning west on Douglas Boulevard and ending immediately at I-80.

Major intersections

County	Location	mi	km	Destinations	Notes
Sacramento	Elk Grove	0.0	0.0	SR 99 – Sacramento, Fresno	Interchange; SR 99 exit 284; southern terminus; road continues west as Kammerer Road
Sacramento	Elk Grove	2.3	3.7	Bradshaw Road	
Sacramento	Elk Grove	3.1	5.0	CR E12 (Elk Grove Boulevard) – Old Town Elk Grove	Eastern terminus of CR E12
Sacramento		9.9	15.9	Grant Line Road north, Sheldon Lake Drive	North end of Grant Line Road on CR E2; south end of Sunrise Boulevard
Sacramento	Rancho Cordova	11.4	18.3	SR 16 (Jackson Road) – Jackson, Sacramento	
Sacramento	Rancho Cordova	18.7	30.1	Folsom Boulevard	Former US 50
Sacramento	Rancho Cordova	19	31	US 50 (El Dorado Freeway) – South Lake Tahoe, Sacramento	Interchange; US 50 exit 18
Sacramento	Fair Oaks	21.2	34.1	Fair Oaks Boulevard	
Sacramento	Fair Oaks–Citrus Heights line	23.2	37.3	Madison Avenue	
Sacramento	Citrus Heights	24.2	38.9	CR E14 (Greenback Lane)	
Sacramento–Placer county line		27.1	43.6	North end of Sunrise Boulevard; south end of Sunrise Avenue	
Placer	Roseville	28.6	46.0	I-80 east – Reno	Interchange; northbound exit only; I-80 west exit 103
Placer	Roseville	28.6	46.0	Pagel Pass Road	Interchange; southbound entrance only from Douglas Boulevard east
Placer	Roseville	29	47	North Sunrise Avenue, Douglas Boulevard east	North end of Sunrise Avenue; south end of Douglas Boulevard on CR E2; serves Sutter Roseville Medical Center, Kaiser Permanente Roseville Medical Center
Placer	Roseville	29.9	48.1	I-80 – Reno, Sacramento	Interchange; northern terminus; I-80 west exit 103, east exits 103A-B; road continues west as Douglas Boulevard
1.000 mi = 1.609 km; 1.000 km = 0.621 mi: Incomplete access

== E3 ==
County Road E3
- Location: Placer and Sacramento counties
- Length: 12.76 mi (20.54 km)
- Existed: 1967–present

County Route E3 (CR E3) is a county highway in Placer and Sacramento counties in the U.S. state of California. It is a major north–south arterial thoroughfare that runs from U.S. Route 50 near Rancho Cordova to Interstate 80 in Rocklin. The route is known as Hazel Avenue from the US 50 interchange to the Sacramento/Placer county line and is known as Sierra College Boulevard from the Sacramento/Placer county line to the I-80 interchange.

Route description

CR E3 begins as Hazel Avenue at the US 50 interchange at the northeastern tip of Rancho Cordova in Sacramento County as a six-lane roadway. It crosses the American River at a curve before continuing north through the unincorporated community of Fair Oaks. After crossing Madison Avenue, CR E3 enters the unincorporated community of Orangevale, while at the same time the roadway narrows down to four lanes.

As it reaches the county line, the route enters Placer County and the roadway becomes Sierra College Boulevard, running roughly through and straddling the city limits of Roseville to the west and the unincorporated community of Granite Bay to the east. As CR E3 abruptly turns northeast, it enters the city of Rocklin. The route then turns north again, crossing Rocklin Road and passing Sierra College (for which CR E3's namesake is named after) to the west. CR E3 reaches its northern terminus at the I-80 interchange in Rocklin. Sierra College Boulevard itself (without the county route designation) continues into the town of Loomis, eventually reaching its northern terminus at State Route 193 east of Lincoln.

Major intersections

County	Location	mi	km	Destinations	Notes
Sacramento	Rancho Cordova	0.0	0.0	US 50 (El Dorado Freeway) – Sacramento, South Lake Tahoe	Interchange; US 50 exit 21; southern terminus; road continues as Hazel Avenue to Folsom Boulevard, then becomes Nimbus Road south of Folsom Boulevard
Sacramento	Fair Oaks	2.5	4.0	Madison Avenue	
Sacramento	Orangevale	3.5	5.6	CR E14 (Greenback Lane)	Eastern terminus of CR E14
Sacramento–Placer county line		6.2	10.0	North end of Hazel Avenue; south end of Sierra College Boulevard	
Placer	Roseville–Granite Bay line	8.1	13.0	Douglas Boulevard	Serves Kaiser Permanente Roseville Medical Center
Placer	Rocklin	12.8	20.6	I-80 – Reno, Sacramento	Interchange; northern terminus; I-80 exit 109; road continues north as Sierra College Boulevard
1.000 mi = 1.609 km; 1.000 km = 0.621 mi

== E4 ==
County Road E4
- Location: Yolo County
- Length: 16.30 mi (26.23 km)
- Existed: 1968–present

County Route E4 (CR E4) is a county highway in Yolo County, California, United States. It runs from State Route 16 in Capay to I-5 in Dunnigan. The route is known as Road 85, Road 8, Road 86, and Road 6.

Major intersections

The entire route is in Yolo County.

Location	mi	km	Destinations	Notes
Capay	0.0	0.0	SR 16	Southern terminus
	10.7	17.2	North end of Road 85 on CR E4; south end of Road 8 on CR E4	
	11.6	18.7	North end of Road 8 on CR E4; south end of Road 86 on CR E4	
	13.2	21.2	Road 86	North end of Road 86 on CR E4; south end of Road 6 on CR E4
Dunnigan	16.3	26.2	I-5 – Sacramento, Redding	Interchange; northern terminus; I-5 exit 556; road continues as Road 6
1.000 mi = 1.609 km; 1.000 km = 0.621 mi

== E5 ==
County Road E5
- Rawhide Road
- Location: Tuolumne County
- Length: 4.03 mi (6.49 km)
- Existed: 1974–present

County Route E5 (CR E5), known entirely as Rawhide Road, is a county highway in Tuolumne County, California, United States. It runs from State Route 49 and State Route 108 in Jamestown to SR 49 in Tuttletown.

Major intersections

The entire route is in Tuolumne County.

Location	mi	km	Destinations	Notes
Jamestown	0.0	0.0	SR 49 / SR 108 – Oakdale, Sonora	Southern terminus; road continues as Humbug Street
Tuttletown	4	6.4	SR 49 – Sonora, Melones, Angels Camp	Northern terminus
1.000 mi = 1.609 km; 1.000 km = 0.621 mi

== E6 ==
County Road E6
- Location: Yolo County
- Length: 15.93 mi (25.64 km)
- Existed: 1968–present

County Route E6 (CR E6) is a county highway in Yolo County, California, United States. It runs from Interstate 505 and State Route 128 near Winters to Interstate 80 in Davis. The route is known as Russell Boulevard, Road 93A, Road 31, Covell Boulevard, and Mace Boulevard.

Major intersections

The entire route is in Yolo County.

Location	mi	km	Destinations	Notes
			SR 128 west (East Grant Avenue) – Winters, Lake Berryessa	Continuation beyond I-505
			I-505 – Redding, Vacaville	Interchange; western terminus; eastern terminus of SR 128; I-505 exit 11
			Russell Boulevard east	East end of Russell Boulevard on CR E6; south end of Road 93A
			Road 31 west	East end of Road 93A; west end of Road 31 on CR E6
			CR E7 (Road 98)	East end of Road 31 on CR E6; west end of Covell Boulevard
Davis			Road 99, Lake Boulevard	Former US 99W
Davis			SR 113 to I-80 – Woodland, Sacramento, San Francisco	Interchange; SR 113 exit 29
Davis			Pole Line Road (CR E8)	
			Road 104	East end of Covell Boulevard; west end of Mace Boulevard
Davis			I-80 – San Francisco, Sacramento	Interchange; eastern terminus; I-80 exit 75; road continues south as Mace Boulevard
1.000 mi = 1.609 km; 1.000 km = 0.621 mi

== E7 ==
County Road E7
- Location: Solano and Yolo counties
- Length: 14.32 mi (23.05 km)
- Existed: 1968–present

County Route E7 (CR E7) is a county highway in Solano and Yolo counties in the U.S. state of California. It runs from Interstate 80 near Dixon to Interstate 5 north of Woodland. It is known as Pedrick Road in Solano County and Road 98 in Yolo County. It has a concurrency with State Route 16 and I-5 Business Loop between West Main Street in Woodland to I-5 (exit 541).

Major intersections

County	Location	mi	km	Destinations	Notes
Solano				I-80 (SR 113) – San Francisco, Sacramento	Interchange; southern terminus; I-80 exit 67; road continues south as Pedrick Road
Solano–Yolo county line				North end of Pedrick Road; south end of Road 98	
Yolo				CR E6 (West Covell Boulevard, Road 31)	
Yolo	Woodland			I-5 BL south (West Main Street) / SR 16 west to I-505	South end of I-5 BL / SR 16 overlap; West Main Street is former SR 16 east
Yolo				I-5 – Sacramento, Redding	Interchange; northern terminus; north end of I-5 BL / SR 16 overlap; northern terminus of I-5 BL; eastern terminus of SR 16 western segment; I-5 exit 541; road continues east as Road 18
1.000 mi = 1.609 km; 1.000 km = 0.621 mi: Concurrency terminus

== E8 ==
County Road E8
- Location: Yolo County
- Length: 15.93 mi (25.64 km)
- Existed: 1968–present

County Route E8 (CR E8) is a county highway in Yolo County, California, United States. It is a major north–south route that runs from Covell Boulevard (County Route E6) in Davis, passing through Woodland, to State Route 113 near Knights Landing. It is known as Pole Line Road and Road 102.

Major intersections

The entire route is in Yolo County.

Location	mi	km	Destinations	Notes
Davis			East Covell Boulevard (CR E6)	Southern terminus; road continues south as Pole Line Road
Davis			North end of Pole Line Road; south end of Road 102	
Woodland			I-5 – Sacramento, Redding	Interchange; I-5 exit 536
Woodland			East Main Street	Former SR 16
			SR 113 – Zamora, Knights Landing, Yuba City	Northern terminus
1.000 mi = 1.609 km; 1.000 km = 0.621 mi

== E9 ==
County Road E9
- Location: Sacramento and Yolo counties
- Length: 13.08 mi (21.05 km)
- Existed: 1968–present

County Route E9 (CR E9) is a county highway in Sacramento and Yolo counties in the U.S. state of California. It connects to State Route 160 at both ends. CR E9 runs on top of the western levee of the Sacramento River for nearly all its length, paralleling SR 160 on the eastern levee. It is known as Sutter Slough Bridge Road from its southern junction with SR 160 at the Paintersville Bridge near the town of Courtland in Sacramento County to the Yolo County line at Sutter Slough. Once in Yolo County, it is known as South River Road and passes through the town of Clarksburg before crossing over the Freeport Bridge and ending at its northern junction with SR 160 in the town of Freeport in Sacramento County.

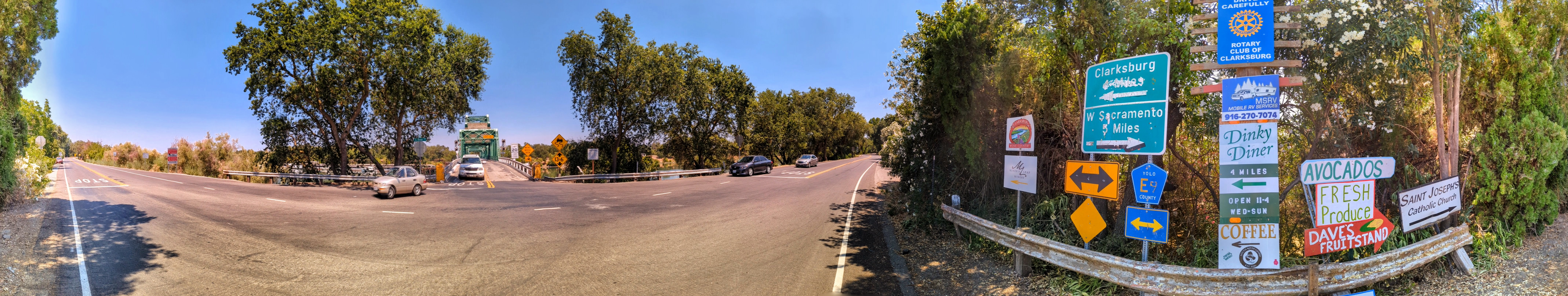
Panoramic view of E9 at the Freeport Bridge. The signage indicates that E9 continues north along South River Road, contrary to original route documents.

Major intersections

County	Location	mi	km	Destinations	Notes
Sacramento		0.0	0.0	SR 160	Southern terminus
Sacramento–Yolo county line		0.7	1.1	North end of Sutter Slough Bridge Road; south end of South River Road	
Yolo		1.2	1.9	Courtland Road (to Jefferson Boulevard) – West Sacramento	Connects to SR 84
Yolo	Clarksburg	9.0	14.5	CR E19 (Clarksburg Avenue)	Eastern terminus of CR E19
Yolo		12.7	20.4	South River Road north – West Sacramento	North end of South River Road on CR E9; south end of the Freeport Bridge
Sacramento River		12.7	20.4	Freeport Bridge	
Sacramento	Freeport	12.9	20.8	SR 160 (Freeport Boulevard, River Road) – Freeport, Sacramento, Isleton	Northern terminus
1.000 mi = 1.609 km; 1.000 km = 0.621 mi

== E10 ==
County Road E10
- Location: Yolo County
- Length: 9.86 mi (15.87 km)
- Existed: 1968–present

County Route E10 (CR E10) is a county highway in Yolo County, California, United States. It runs from Interstate 505 to State Route 113 near Knights Landing. The route is known as Road 14 and Road 13.

Major intersections

The entire route is in Yolo County.

Location	mi	km	Destinations	Notes
			I-505	Interchange; western terminus; I-505 exit 28; road continues west as Road 14
			East end of Road 14 on CR E10; west end of Road 13 on CR E10	
Zamora			Main Street, Road 94 – Zamora	
Zamora			I-5 – Sacramento, Redding	Interchange; I-5 exit 548
Zamora			Road 99W	Former US 99W
			Road 99E (CR E11)	Southern terminus of CR E11
			SR 113 – Woodland, Knights Landing, Yuba City	Eastern terminus
1.000 mi = 1.609 km; 1.000 km = 0.621 mi

== E11 ==
County Road E11
- Location: Yolo County
- Length: 5.19 mi (8.35 km)
- Existed: 1976–present

County Route E11 (CR E11) is a county highway in Yolo County, California, United States. It runs from State Route 113 near Knights Landing to State Route 45 near Tyndall Landing. The route is known as Road 99E (no relation to the former U.S. Route 99E), Road 108, and Road 98A. A portion of the route is unpaved gravel.

Major intersections

The entire route is in Yolo County.

Location	mi	km	Destinations	Notes
			SR 113 / Road 13 (CR E10) – Woodland, Knights Landing, Yuba City	Southern terminus
			Road 108 east	North end of Road 99E; south end of Road 108 and gravel road
			North end of Road 108 on CR E11; south end of Road 98A on CR E11	
			North end of gravel road	
			SR 45	Northern terminus
1.000 mi = 1.609 km; 1.000 km = 0.621 mi

== E12 ==
County Road E12
- Elk Grove Boulevard
- Location: Sacramento County
- Length: 6.83 mi (10.99 km)
- Existed: 1971–present

County Route E12 (CR E12), known entirely as Elk Grove Boulevard, is a county road in Sacramento County, California, United States, in the city of Elk Grove. E12 runs from Franklin Boulevard (County Route J8) to Grant Line Road (County Route E2).

Route description

Elk Grove Boulevard is a major east–west arterial in Elk Grove from Interstate 5 (I-5) to Elk Grove Florin Road. The CR E12 designation officially ends at Franklin Boulevard (CR J8) east of I-5, although some commercially produced maps may show all of Elk Grove Boulevard designated as CR E12.

CR E12 was first established in 1971 when the area was just a small farming community, and the segment of I-5 through the region between Stockton and Sacramento was not completed until 1979. The area has since experienced significant urban development, and Elk Grove was later incorporated as a city in 2000. East of Elk Grove Florin Road, CR E12/Elk Grove Boulevard narrows to two lanes and proceeds east through the historical "Old Town" section of Elk Grove to its terminus with Grant Line Road (CR E2).

Public transportation

Sacramento Regional Transit's Elk Grove Transit buses E112, E115, and E116 run on Elk Grove Boulevard.

Major intersections

The entire route is in Elk Grove, Sacramento County.

mi	km	Destinations	Notes
0	0.0	CR J8 (Franklin Boulevard)	Western terminus; Elk Grove Boulevard continues west to I-5
1.7	2.7	Bruceville Road	
3.3	5.3	SR 99 – Fresno, Sacramento	Interchange; SR 99 exit 286
4.2	6.8	Elk Grove Florin Road	
6.83	10.99	CR E2 (Grant Line Road)	Eastern terminus
1.000 mi = 1.609 km; 1.000 km = 0.621 mi

== E13 ==
County Road E13
- Location: Sacramento County
- Length: 14.79 mi (23.80 km)
- Existed: 1971–present
- Tourist routes: River Road

County Route E13 (CR E13) is a county highway in Sacramento County, California, United States. It runs from River Road (County Route J11) and the Walnut Grove Bridge in Walnut Grove to State Route 99 and State Route 104 in Galt. The route is known as River Road and Twin Cities Road.

Route description

County Route E13 begins at its junction with CR J11 at the eastern terminus of the Walnut Grove Bridge in Walnut Grove and proceeds north on top of the eastern levee of the Sacramento River, along River Road, passing the small town of Locke. At the intersection of River Road and Twin Cities Road, CR E13 turns east and follows Twin Cities Road. The route reaches its junction with I-5 and County Route J8 north of the town of Thornton, and continues east until its junction with SR 99 and SR 104 in Galt.

River Road is on the California Scenic Highway System.

Major intersections

The entire route is in Sacramento County.

Location	mi	km	Destinations	Notes
Walnut Grove			CR J11 (Walnut Grove Bridge, River Road south) / Theater Street – Ryde, Isleton, Rio Vista, Antioch	Western terminus; connects to SR 160
			River Road north – Courtland	East end of River Road on CR E13; west end of Twin Cities Road
			I-5 – Los Angeles, Sacramento	Interchange; I-5 exit 498
			CR J8 (Franklin Boulevard)	
Galt			SR 99 – Fresno, Sacramento	Interchange; eastern terminus; accessible via East and West Stockton Boulevards; western terminus of SR 104; SR 99 exit 277
Galt			SR 104 east (Twin Cities Road) – Ione, Jackson	Continuation beyond SR 99
1.000 mi = 1.609 km; 1.000 km = 0.621 mi

== E14 ==
County Road E14
- Location: Sacramento County
- Length: 17.62 mi (28.36 km)
- Existed: 1972–present

County Route E14 (CR E14) is a county highway in Sacramento County, California, United States. It runs from State Route 99 in Sacramento to Hazel Avenue (County Route E3) in Orangevale. Known as Elkhorn Boulevard and Greenback Lane, it is a major east–west arterial thoroughfare that connects the cities and communities of Sacramento, Rio Linda, North Highlands, Foothill Farms, Citrus Heights, and Orangevale.

Route description

County Route E14 begins on Elkhorn Boulevard at the interchange with State Route 99 north of Sacramento. It starts out as a two-lane roadway, skirting the northern end of the North Natomas development of Sacramento. As it enters the rural community of Rio Linda, the roadway expands to four lanes and remains at least four lanes throughout the remainder of the route. The landscape changes from rural to suburb as it passes through North Highlands and Foothill Farms, where the roadway expands to six lanes at Don Julio Boulevard. As it reaches the interchange with Interstate 80, the route becomes Greenback Lane. Shortly thereafter, it enters the city of Citrus Heights and remains in the city for 3.5 miles (5.6 km). As CR E14 reaches Sunrise Boulevard (CR E2), it enters the city's shopping district, Sunrise MarketPlace, and passes by Sunrise Mall. As it exits Citrus Heights and into the community of Fair Oaks, the roadway is reduced to four lanes as it reaches its terminus at Hazel Avenue (County Route E3) in Orangevale. The roadway itself continues as Greenback Lane towards the city of Folsom.

Elkhorn Boulevard west of SR 99 (without the county route designation) continues west to the Sacramento International Airport, passing through the Metro Air Park industrial complex. Elkhorn used to end at Power Line Road but was extended into the airport as an alternate route as Interstate 5 is the main route to the airport. The extension officially opened on May 21, 2024. A separate Elkhorn Boulevard is west of the airport but is a rural and narrow country road that is inaccessible to the airport. It runs from Garden Highway to a closed gate just short of the airport's property border.

The name "greenback" refers to the use of paper money for financial transactions at a time when gold and silver coin was the preferred rate of exchange. The property that Greenback Lane lies on was bought with greenback dollars (United States Note). The owner is said to have wished to be paid with coin, and became angered when he was not, hence the name "Greenback Lane."

Greenback Lane has a very interesting origin. Previous to 1873, the inhabitants of Haggin Grant District had only the narrow, stony trails leading through the dense timberlands to serve as outlets from their homesteads. The discomfort and disadvantages wrought by these crude by-ways impelled the farmers to demand a main road. A county survey determined the amount of land necessary to grant the demand of the land holders. In settling with Mr. Cornelius Donohue, a large land owner, for the road land, a dispute arose as to the medium of exchange. Mr. Donahue insisted that his portion of the land be paid for in "greenbacks", for it was neither safe nor convenient to carry a large sum of coin in those days. It was no easy matter for the county to secure such a large number of greenbacks; nevertheless, they were still requested. After months of discussion, Mr. Donahue won his point, and the land was paid for in greenback notes. From this incident, the highway has been named "Greenback Lane."

— "Greenback Notes", San Juan High School Yearbook (1925)

Construction to expand Greenback Lane between Dewey Drive / Van Maren Lane and Auburn Boulevard in Citrus Heights from four to six lanes was completed in 2008, creating an entirely six lane thoroughfare within the city of Citrus Heights.

Major intersections

The entire route is in Sacramento County.

Location	mi	km	Destinations	Notes
Sacramento	0.0	0.0	SR 99 – Yuba City, Sacramento	Interchange; SR 99 exit 307; western terminus; connects to I-5; road continues west as Elkhorn Boulevard to Sacramento International Airport
Sacramento	1.7	2.7	Natomas Boulevard	
Rio Linda	4.5	7.2	Rio Linda Boulevard	
North Highlands	8.7	14.0	Watt Avenue	
Foothill Farms	11.6	18.7	I-80 – Sacramento, Reno	Interchange; I-80 exit 98; east end of Elkhorn Boulevard; west end of Greenback Lane
Citrus Heights	12.5	20.1	Auburn Boulevard	Former US 40 / US 99E
Citrus Heights	15.2	24.5	CR E2 (Sunrise Boulevard)	
Citrus Heights–Fair Oaks line	15.7	25.3	Fair Oaks Boulevard	
Orangevale	17.7	28.5	CR E3 (Hazel Avenue)	Eastern terminus; road continues east as Greenback Lane
1.000 mi = 1.609 km; 1.000 km = 0.621 mi

== E15 ==
County Road E15
- Location: Calaveras County
- Length: 12.91 mi (20.78 km)
- Existed: 1974–present

County Route E15 (CR E15) is a county highway in Calaveras County, California, United States. It runs from State Route 120 in Yosemite Junction to State Route 4 in Copperopolis. The route is known as O'Byrnes Ferry Road for most of the route and Main Street in Copperopolis.

Major intersections

County	Location	mi	km	Destinations	Notes
Tuolumne				SR 108 / SR 120 – Oakdale, Sonora	Southern terminus
Lake Tulloch				Byrne's Ferry Covered Bridge	
Calaveras	Copperopolis			North end of O'Byrnes Ferry Road; Main Street	
Calaveras	Copperopolis			SR 4 – Altaville, Angels Camp, Stockton	Northern terminus; road continues as Rock Creek Road
1.000 mi = 1.609 km; 1.000 km = 0.621 mi

== E16 ==
County Road E16
- Location: Amador and El Dorado counties
- Length: 33.21 mi (53.45 km)
- Existed: 1967–present

County Route E16 (CR E16) is a county highway in Amador and El Dorado counties in the U.S. state of California. It runs from State Route 49 in Plymouth to U.S. Route 50 in Pollock Pines. The route is known as Shenandoah Road, Mount Aukum Road, and Sly Park Road. A portion of the route (along with Mormon Emigrant Trail, State Route 88, and State Route 89) was an alternate route of US 50 when the highway was closed due to mudslides or rockslides from inclement weather.

Major intersections

County	Location	mi	km	Destinations	Notes
Amador	Plymouth			SR 49 – Placerville, Jackson	Roundabout; southern terminus; road continues as Main Street
Amador	River Pines			North end of Shenandoah Road; south end of Mount Aukum Road	
El Dorado	Pleasant Valley			Pleasant Valley Road – Camino, Placerville	North end of Mount Aukum Road; south end of Sly Park Road
El Dorado				Mormon Emigrant Trail to SR 88	Former south end of US 50 Alt. overlap
El Dorado	Pollock Pines			US 50 (El Dorado Freeway) – South Lake Tahoe, Sacramento	Interchange; northern terminus; former north end of US 50 Alt. overlap; US 50 exit 60; road continues as Sly Park Road to Pony Express Trail
1.000 mi = 1.609 km; 1.000 km = 0.621 mi

== E17 ==
County Road E17
- Location: Tuolumne County
- Length: 13.39 mi (21.55 km)
- Existed: 1974–present

County Route E17 (CR E17) is an unsigned county highway in Tuolumne County, California, United States. It runs from Mono Way (old State Route 108) near Sonora to SR 108 near Twain Harte. The route is known as Tuolumne Road and Tuolumne Road North.

Major intersections

The entire route is in Tuolumne County.

Location	mi	km	Destinations	Notes
			Mono Way (SR 108 Bus.)	Western terminus
Tuolumne			Tuolumne Road east, Cherry Valley Boulevard	East end of Tuolumne Road; west end of Tuolumne Road North
			SR 108	Eastern terminus
1.000 mi = 1.609 km; 1.000 km = 0.621 mi

== E18 ==
County Road E18
- Parrotts Ferry Road
- Location: Calaveras and Tuolumne counties
- Length: 12.78 mi (20.57 km)
- Existed: 1974–present

County Route E18 (CR E18), known entirely as Parrotts Ferry Road, is a county highway in Calaveras and Tuolumne counties in the U.S. state of California. It runs from State Route 49 north of Sonora, passing through the community of Columbia, to State Route 4 in Vallecito.

Major intersections

County	Location	mi	km	Destinations	Notes
Tuolumne				SR 49 – Angels Camp, Sonora	Southern terminus
Tuolumne				Springfield Road – Jamestown	
Calaveras	Vallecito			SR 4 – Murphys, Angels Camp	Northern terminus
1.000 mi = 1.609 km; 1.000 km = 0.621 mi

== E19 ==
County Road E19
- Location: Yolo County
- Length: 3.12 mi (5.02 km)
- Existed: 1976–present

County Route E19 (CR E19) is a two-lane county highway in Yolo County, California, United States. It runs from Jefferson Boulevard (State Route 84) to South River Road (CR E9) in Clarksburg. The route is known as Clarksburg Road from Jefferson Boulevard to Willow Avenue and Clarksburg Avenue in Clarksburg from Willow Avenue to South River Road. Apart from a reassurance shield at its eastern terminus, the route is largely unsigned.

Major intersections

The entire route is in Yolo County.

Location	mi	km	Destinations	Notes
	0.0	0.0	SR 84 (Jefferson Boulevard)	Western terminus; road continues west as Clarksburg Road
Clarksburg	2.9	4.7	Willow Avenue	East end of Clarksburg Road; west end of Clarksburg Avenue
Clarksburg	3.1	5.0	CR E9 (South River Road)	Eastern terminus
1.000 mi = 1.609 km; 1.000 km = 0.621 mi

== E20 ==
County Road E20
- Marysville Road
- Location: Yuba County
- Length: 19.93 mi (32.07 km)
- Existed: 1977–present

County Route E20 (CR E20), known entirely as Marysville Road, is a county highway in Yuba County, California, United States. It runs from Willow Glen Road (County Route E21) to State Route 49 near Camptonville.

Major intersections

The entire route is in Yuba County.

Location	mi	km	Destinations	Notes
	0.0	0.0	CR E21 (Willow Glen Road, Marysville Road) – Brownsville, Loma Rica, Marysville	Western terminus
	19.9	32.0	SR 49 – Camptonville, Downieville, North San Juan, Nevada City	Eastern terminus
1.000 mi = 1.609 km; 1.000 km = 0.621 mi

== E21 ==
County Road E21
- Location: Butte, Plumas, and Yuba counties
- Length: 46.45 mi (74.75 km)
- Existed: 1977–present

County Route E21 (CR E21) is a county highway in Butte, Plumas, and Yuba counties in the U.S. state of California. It runs from State Route 20 in Browns Valley to Warren Hill Road in La Porte. The route is known as Marysville Road, Willow Glen Road, La Porte Road, Quincy La Porte Road, and Main Street in La Porte.

Major intersections

County	Location	mi	km	Destinations	Notes
Yuba				SR 20 – Marysville, Grass Valley	Southern terminus
Yuba				Loma Rica Road – Loma Rica, Oroville	
Yuba				CR E20 (Marysville Road) – Dobbins, Bullards Bar Dam	Western terminus of CR E20; north end of Marysville Road on CR E21; south end of Willow Glen Road
Yuba	Challenge–Brownsville			La Porte Road south – Rackerby, Bangor, Oroville	North end of Willow Glen Road; south end of La Porte Road on CR E21
Yuba				Challenge Cut-Off Road – Forbestown	
Butte				No major intersections	
Yuba				No major intersections	
Yuba–Plumas county line				North end of La Porte Road; south end of Quincy La Porte Road	
Plumas	La Porte			Laporte Pines Road	North end of Quincy La Porte Road; south end of Main Street
Plumas	La Porte			Warren Hill Road	Northern terminus; road continues as Quincy La Porte Road
1.000 mi = 1.609 km; 1.000 km = 0.621 mi
