= Interstate 5 =

Interstate Highway along the West Coast of the United States

Interstate 5
- I-5 highlighted in red

Route information
- Length: 1,381.29 mi (2,222.97 km)
- Existed: August 14, 1957–present
- History: Completed in 1979
- NHS: Entire route

Major junctions
- South end: Fed. 1 / Fed. 1D at the Mexican border in San Diego, CA
- I-8 in San Diego, CA; I-10 / US 101 in Los Angeles, CA; US 50 in Sacramento, CA; I-80 in Sacramento, CA; US 20 in Albany, OR; I-84 / US 30 in Portland, OR; US 101 in Tumwater, WA; I-90 in Seattle, WA; US 2 in Everett, WA
- North end: Highway 99 at the Canadian border in Blaine, WA

Location
- Country: United States
- States: California, Oregon, Washington

Highway system
- Interstate Highway System; Main; Auxiliary; Suffixed; Business; Future

Interstate 5 (I-5) is the main north–south Interstate Highway on the West Coast of the United States, running largely parallel to the Pacific coast of the contiguous U.S. from Mexico to Canada. It travels through the states of California, Oregon, and Washington, serving several large cities on the West Coast, including San Diego, Los Angeles, Sacramento, Portland, and Seattle. It is the only continuous Interstate highway to connect the Mexican and Canadian borders. Upon crossing the Mexican border at its southern terminus near San Diego, the highway continues to Tijuana, Baja California as Mexican Federal Highway 1 (Fed. 1). Upon crossing the Canadian border at its northern terminus in Blaine, Washington, it continues to Vancouver, British Columbia as British Columbia Highway 99 (BC 99).

I-5 was originally authorized in 1956 as part of the Interstate Highway System and officially designated in 1957, but it was predated by several auto trails and highways built in the early 20th century. The Pacific Highway was built in the 1910s and 1920s by the states of California, Oregon, and Washington, and was later incorporated into U.S. Route 99 (US 99) in 1926. I-5 largely follows the route of US 99, with the exception of portions south of Los Angeles and in the Central Valley of California. The freeway was built in segments between the 1950s and late 1970s, including expressway sections of US 99 that were built earlier to bypass various towns along the route. US 99 was removed in 1972.

== Route description ==
Lengths
| | mi | km |
|---|---|---|
| CA | 796.53 | 1,281.89 |
| OR | 308.14 | 495.90 |
| WA | 276.62 | 445.18 |
| Total | 1,381.29 | 2,222.97 |

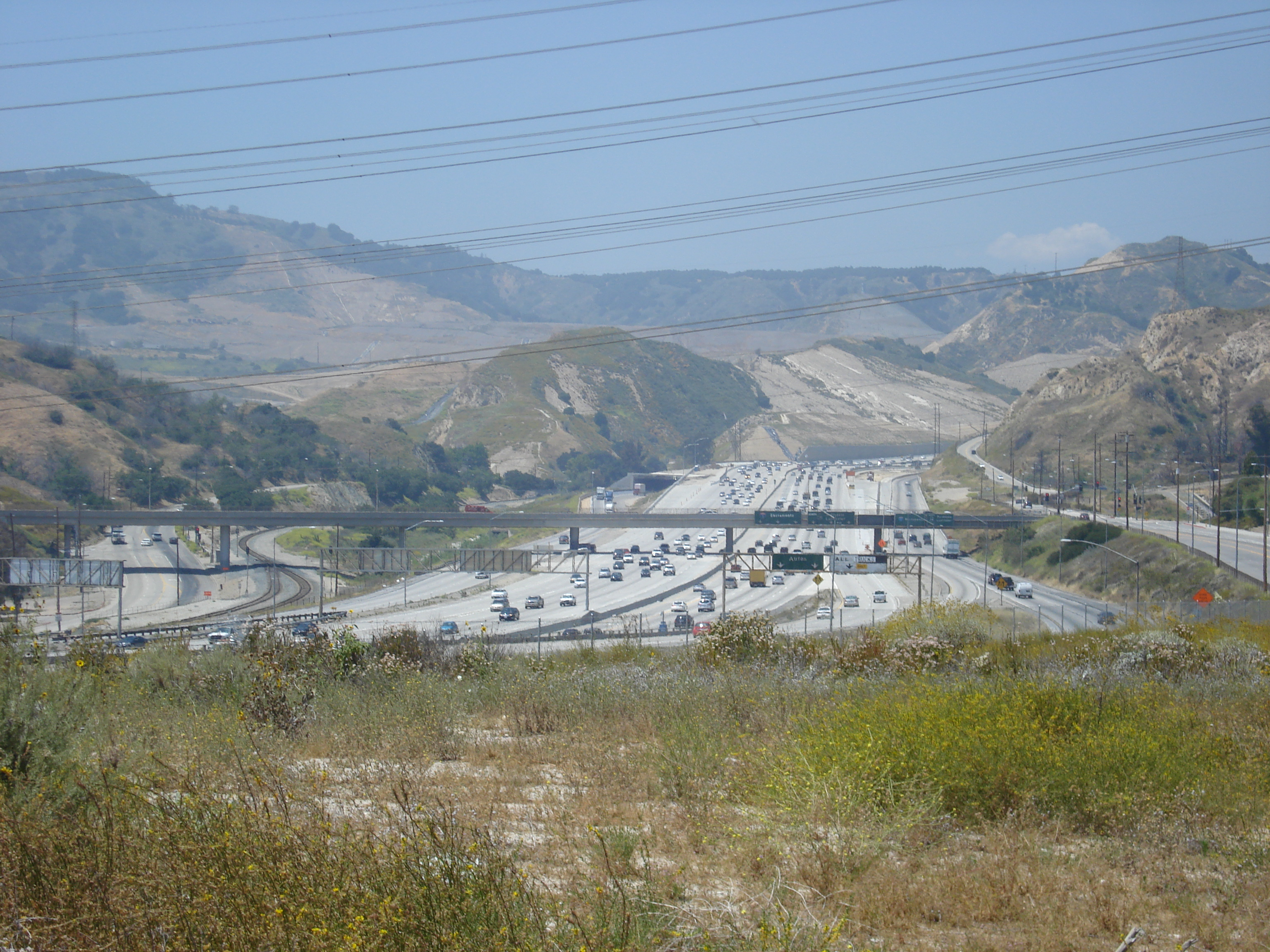
I-5 in the Newhall Pass Interchange where it intersects with I-210 and SR 14 near Santa Clarita

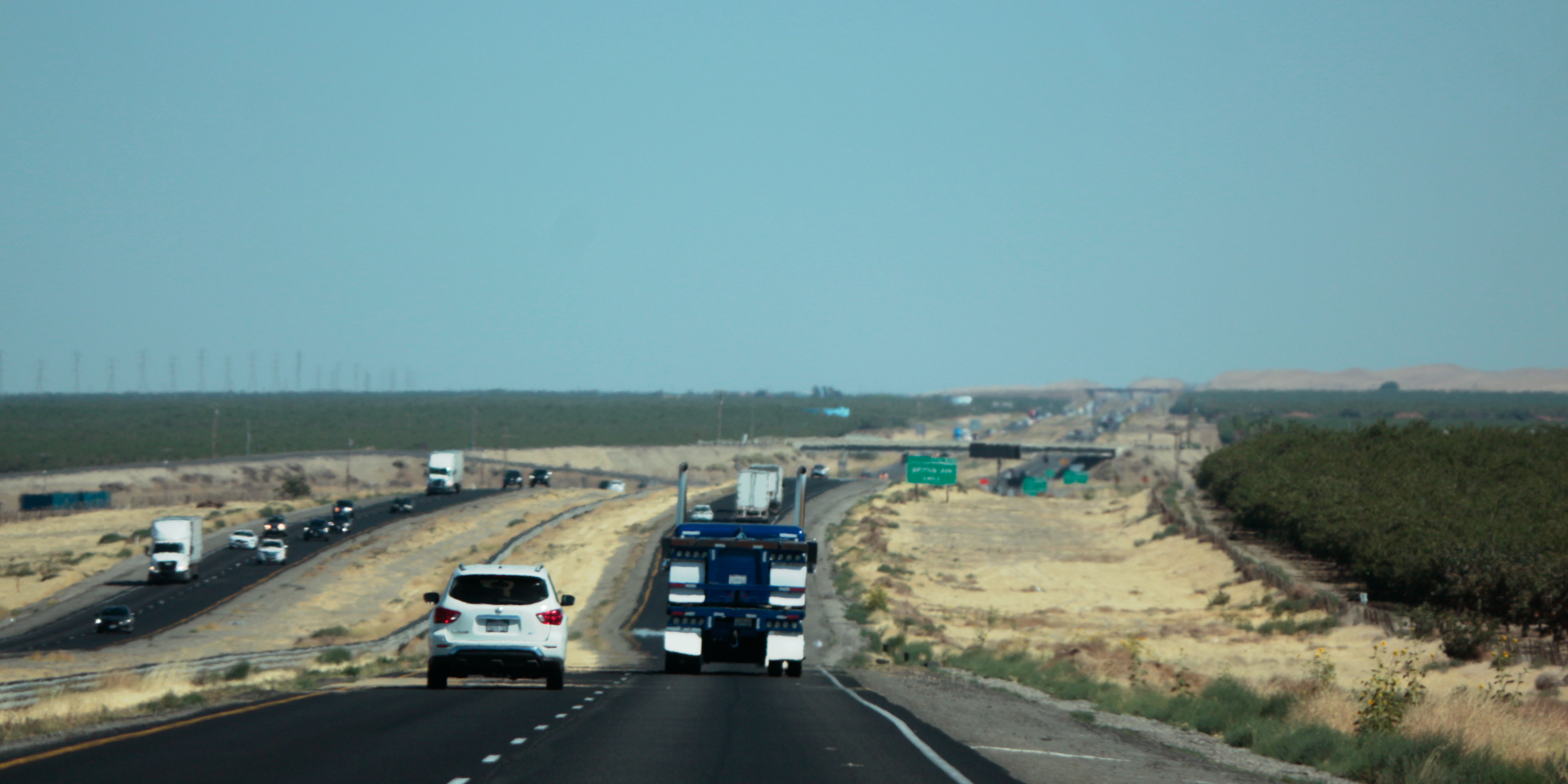
I-5 in the Central Valley, looking south near Derrick Avenue in Fresno County

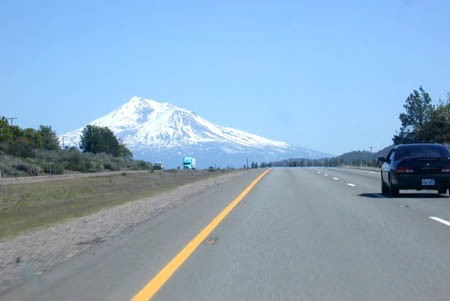
I-5 southbound, approaching Weed and Mount Shasta

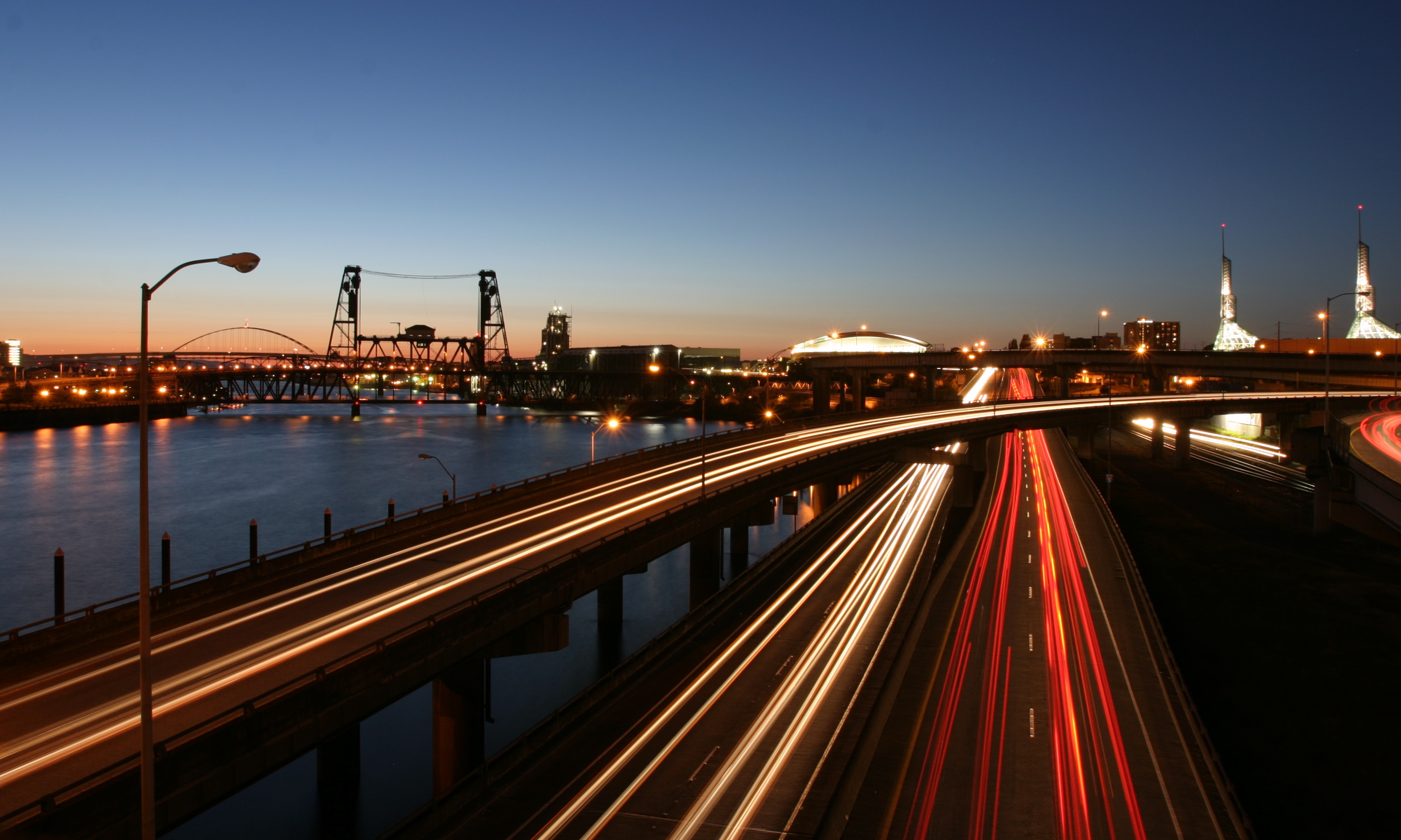
I-5 running adjacent to the Willamette River and passes by the Moda Center, and Oregon Convention Center in Downtown Portland

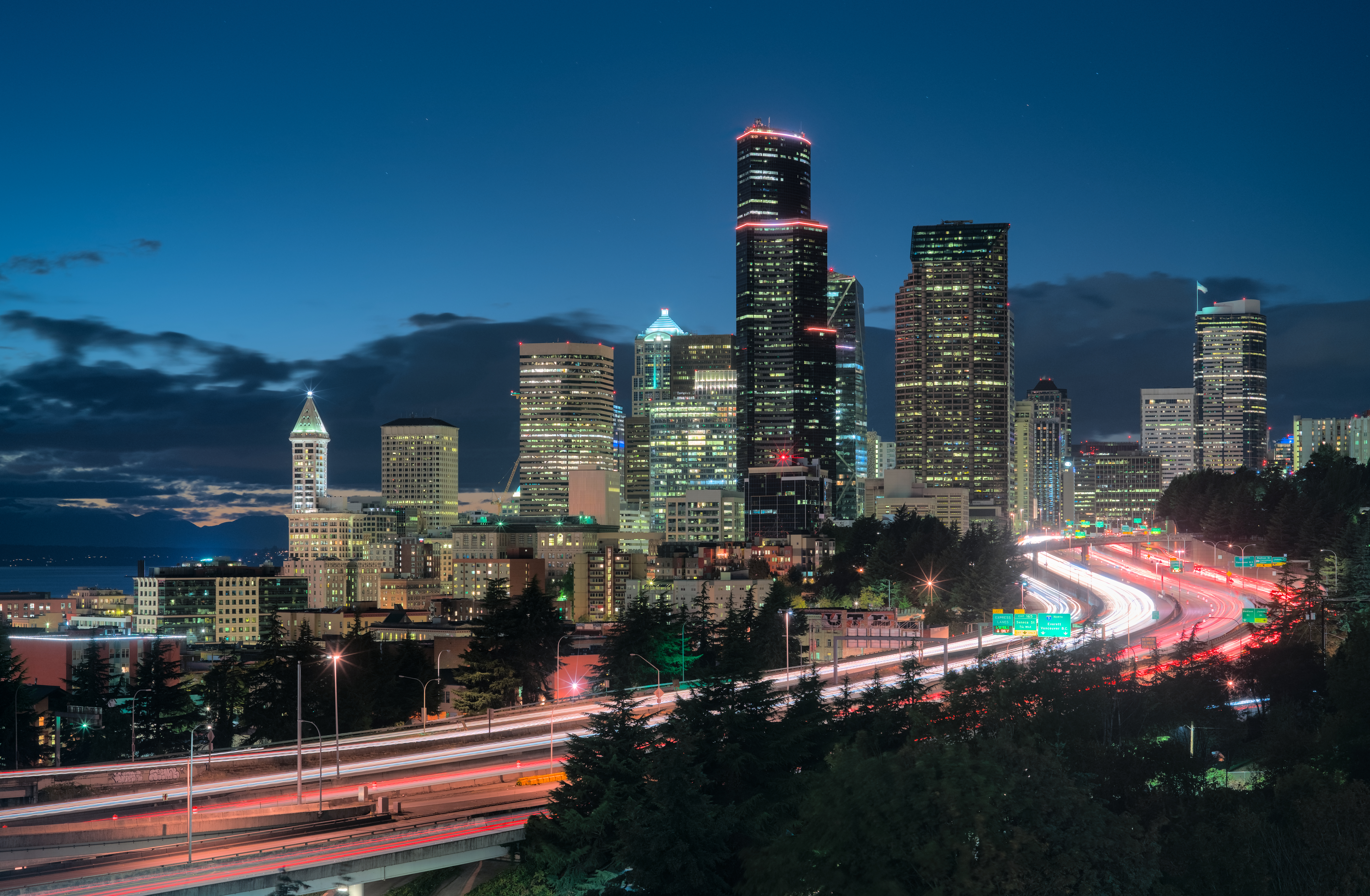
I-5 passing through Downtown Seattle

I-5 is a major Interstate Highway that spans 1,381 miles (2,223 km) and runs north–south through the West Coast states of California, Oregon, and Washington. It connects several major metropolitan areas as well as agricultural regions, seaports, and freight destinations. The freeway ranges from four lanes in rural sections to as many as 22 lanes in Orange County, California, where it had been widened and reconstructed.

=== California ===
The southern terminus of I-5 is at the Mexican border at the San Ysidro Port of Entry, the busiest land border crossing in the Western Hemisphere; the crossing handles a daily average of 70,000 vehicles and 20,000 pedestrians crossing northbound and connects with Mexican Federal Highway 1 in Tijuana. The freeway splits in San Diego's San Ysidro neighborhood, with I-5 traveling northwest through Chula Vista and National City on the John J. Montgomery Freeway and I-805 serving the eastern neighborhoods. I-5 follows the shore of San Diego Bay and intersects State Route 15 (a continuation of I-15) near Naval Station San Diego. The freeway then travels around downtown San Diego and San Diego International Airport before reaching a junction with I-8.

I-5 passes through the University of California, San Diego campus, merging with I-805 nearby, and follows the Pacific coastline through the northern suburbs of San Diego. Between Oceanside and San Clemente, an 18-mile (29 km) stretch of the San Diego Freeway passes through Marine Corps Base Camp Pendleton before entering Orange County. At Dana Point, I-5 turns inland and heads north through Mission Viejo to the El Toro Y interchange in Irvine, where I-405 splits and carries the San Diego Freeway designation. I-5 continues northwest as the Santa Ana Freeway through several Orange County and Los Angeles County suburbs and passes near Disneyland in Anaheim. The freeway intersects I-605 in Downey and I-710 in Commerce before reaching the city of Los Angeles. Southern Californians often refer to I-5 as "the 5".

At the East Los Angeles Interchange near downtown Los Angeles, I-5 intersects US 101 and begins a short concurrency with I-10 on a section of the Golden State Freeway. The freeway splits from I-10 and turns northwest to follow the Los Angeles River through Glendale and into Burbank. I-5 then leaves the river and travels across the San Fernando Valley, later crossing the Newhall Pass through the Santa Susana Mountains to reach the Santa Clarita Valley; the Newhall Pass interchange with State Route 14 is notable for having separate lanes for truck traffic due to the steep grade on the mainline lanes. The freeway passes the city of Santa Clarita and ascends into the Sierra Pelona Mountains, where the northbound and southbound lanes separate and cross sides for approximately 5 miles (8.0 km). The northbound ascent includes a continuous 5 percent grade for 5 miles (8.0 km). After passing Pyramid Lake, I-5 makes several turns as it follows a series of narrow valleys to reach the second-highest point of its entire length, Tejon Pass (elevation 4,144 ft or 1,263 m) in the Tehachapi Mountains.

The freeway then traverses the narrow Grapevine Canyon and descends for 12 miles (19 km) into the San Joaquin Valley. At Wheeler Ridge near the south end of the valley, State Route 99 splits from the freeway to serve Bakersfield and other major cities in the Central Valley, while I-5 stays to the west. Now named the West Side Freeway, I-5 travels northwest along the edge of the Central Valley through farmland, being deliberately routed west of populated areas. The freeway is connected to several of the valley's main cities, including Fresno, Merced, and Modesto, through other east–west highways.

Near Tracy, I-580 splits from I-5 to provide the first of several connections to the San Francisco Bay Area; I-205 northeast of Tracy also provides a connection through I-580. The freeway continues north through Stockton to Sacramento, where it follows the Sacramento River through the southern suburbs and along the edge of downtown. I-5 intersects two transcontinental highways in the Sacramento area: US 50 south of downtown and I-80 in the northern suburbs. After an unsigned concurrency with State Route 99 in northern Sacramento, the freeway turns west to pass the city's airport and resumes its northwestern path at Woodland. It then intersects I-505, another Bay Area connector, near Dunnigan.

The freeway continues north along the western edge of the Sacramento Valley, passing through farmland and several small towns before reaching the end of the valley at Red Bluff. I-5 then traverses the rugged Shasta Cascade region, passing through Redding and crossing Shasta Lake before beginning its ascent towards Mount Shasta. The freeway follows the Sacramento River upstream to the southwestern slopes of the mountain and turns northwest to reach Weed, where it intersects US 97, a major highway serving the Inland Northwest region. I-5 continues through Yreka in the Shasta Valley and follows the Klamath River into the Siskiyou Mountains, where it crosses into Oregon.

=== Oregon ===
I-5 enters Oregon near Siskiyou Summit, which sits at 4,310 feet (1,310 m) and is the highest point on the highway. From the summit, I-5 descends by 2,300 feet (700 m) over 6 miles (9.7 km) at a 6 percent grade to reach the Rogue Valley. The freeway passes through Ashland and Medford, running parallel to Oregon Route 99, and turns west to follow the Rogue River to Grants Pass, where it intersects US 199. I-5 then turns north and crosses a series of passes in the Klamath Mountains to reach the Umpqua Valley, where it follows the South Umpqua River to Roseburg.

The highway enters the Willamette Valley near Cottage Grove and forms the boundary between the cities of Eugene and Springfield. After crossing the Willamette River, I-5 intersects Oregon Route 126, which carries I-105, and Oregon Route 569; both highways provide connections to Eugene and Springfield. I-5 then travels due north through farmland on the east side of the Willamette River, passing a junction with US 20 in Albany, and bisects eastern Salem near the state capitol campus. It is connected to downtown Salem by Oregon Route 22 and the Salem Parkway, which joins I-5 as the freeway crosses the 45th parallel near Keizer.

From Salem, I-5 turns northeast and passes Woodburn before crossing the Willamette River on the Boone Bridge in Wilsonville, at the south end of the Portland metropolitan area. The freeway travels through the southern suburbs of Portland, intersecting I-205 in Tualatin and Oregon Route 217 in Tigard before entering the city proper. I-5 then turns northeast to follow Barbur Boulevard (part of Route 99W) and navigate the Terwilliger curves, a notoriously dangerous road section. The freeway continues north through the South Waterfront neighborhood, crossing under the Portland Aerial Tram and the western approach to the Ross Island Bridge (carrying US 26) before reaching an interchange with I-405.

I-5 and I-405 form a complete loop around downtown Portland, with I-5 crossing the Willamette River on the Marquam Bridge to run along the eastern riverfront. The freeway has interchanges with several major bridges crossing the Willamette, as well as the western terminus of I-84 near the Oregon Convention Center. From the I-84 interchange to a second junction with I-405 near the Fremont Bridge, I-5 is concurrent with US 30, which continues west towards Astoria. Through North Portland, the freeway runs below street level until it crosses the Columbia Slough to bisect Delta Park. I-5 continues across Hayden Island to the Interstate Bridge, a pair of vertical-lift bridges which carry the highway over the Columbia River into Washington state.

=== Washington ===
The highway enters Vancouver at the north end of the Interstate Bridge and immediately intersects Washington State Route 14 near the Fort Vancouver National Historic Site. The freeway passes near downtown Vancouver and continues north through the city's suburbs before being rejoined by I-205 at Salmon Creek. I-5 travels north along the Columbia River to Kelso and Longview, where it switches to following the Cowlitz River between the Willapa Hills and Cascade foothills. The freeway then turns northwest to traverse a prairie and the adjacent cities of Chehalis and Centralia while concurrent with US 12.

I-5 continues north to a junction with US 101 in Tumwater, near Olympia and the state capitol campus. The freeway skirts the southeast side of downtown Olympia and turns east to cross Joint Base Lewis–McChord (formerly Fort Lewis and McChord Air Force Base). I-5 then turns north to enter Tacoma but bends east to intersect I-705, a short spur into downtown Tacoma. The freeway turns north again after leaving Tacoma and its nearby seaport near Fife to traverse the suburbs of South King County. I-5 intersects its eastern bypass of Seattle, I-405, in Tukwila near Seattle–Tacoma International Airport.

The freeway generally follows the Green and Duwamish rivers into Seattle, passing Boeing Field and the industrial district in the process. I-5 intersects I-90 near Seattle's Chinatown–International District on the south side of downtown Seattle. The freeway turns northwest and bisects downtown Seattle in a trench, with some sections covered by Freeway Park and the Seattle Convention Center. It then turns north to intersect Washington State Route 520 near Eastlake and crosses the Ship Canal Bridge over Portage Bay, which lies between Lake Union and Lake Washington. I-5 continues through northern Seattle, passing the University District near the University of Washington campus and Green Lake before leaving the city. The section between downtown Seattle and Northgate includes a set of traditionally reversible express lanes that add extra capacity in the peak direction of travel.

I-5 continues through the northern suburbs of Seattle and turns northeasterly in Lynnwood, where it is rejoined by I-405, which serves the Eastside region. The freeway travels north through Everett, skirting the city's downtown and intersecting US 2, and leaves the Seattle metropolitan area for the rural Skagit Valley. I-5 descends into the valley and travels through Mount Vernon and Burlington before climbing into the Chuckanut Mountains, where it turns west towards Bellingham Bay (part of the Salish Sea). The freeway travels around downtown Bellingham and turns northwest to continue across the rural Fraser Lowland. I-5 terminates at the Peace Arch Border Crossing on the Canadian border, adjacent to the eponymous monument, in Blaine. The highway becomes British Columbia Highway 99, which continues northwest to Vancouver.

== History ==
The shield for US 99

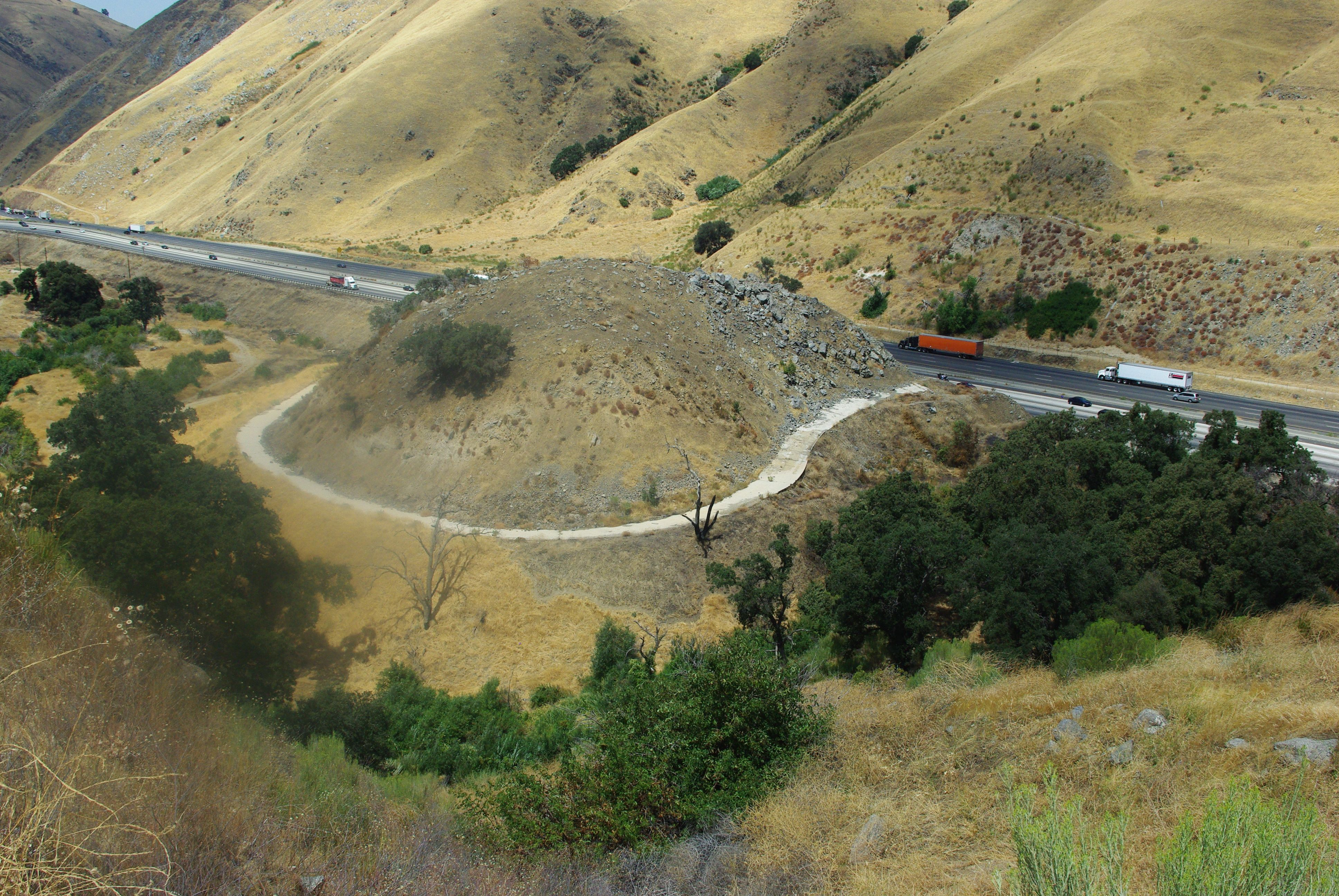
A section of the 1915 Ridge Route in Lebec, California, abandoned when US 99 (later upgraded to I-5) was constructed over the Tejon Pass in order to make the travel straighter and safer.

An extensive section of this highway (over 600 mi (970 km)), from approximately Stockton, California, to Portland, Oregon, follows the track of the Siskiyou Trail. This trail was based on an older network of Native American footpaths connecting the Pacific Northwest with California's Central Valley. By the 1820s, trappers from the Hudson's Bay Company were using the route of today's I-5 to move between today's Washington state and California. During the second half of the 19th century, mule trains, stagecoaches, and the Central Pacific railroad also followed the route of the Siskiyou Trail. By the early 20th century, pioneering automobile roads were built along the path of the Siskiyou Trail, notably the Pacific Highway. The Pacific Highway ran from British Columbia to San Diego, California, and was the immediate predecessor of much of US 99. The route of US 99 was in turn used as a basis for much of the route of today's I-5.

A major deviation from the old US 99 route is the Westside Freeway portion of I-5 in California's Central Valley. To provide a faster and more direct north–south route through the state, the decision was made to build a new freeway to the west and bypass Fresno, Bakersfield, and the other major population centers in the area instead of upgrading the existing highway (which was re-designated as part of SR 99). This re-route through California's Central Valley was the last section of I-5 to be constructed, with the final segment dedicated and opened to traffic near Stockton, California, on October 12, 1979. Representatives from both Canada and Mexico attended the dedication to commemorate the completion of a continuous Interstate highway connecting the Mexican and Canadian borders. It cost an estimated $2.3 billion in 1979 dollars (equivalent to $7.99 billion in 2024 dollars) to construct all of I-5.

This direct route also bypasses San Francisco and the rest of the San Francisco Bay Area. Original plans called for a loop Interstate with a directional suffix, I-5W. The proposed route now roughly corresponds to I-580 from I-5 south of Tracy to Oakland, I-80 from Oakland to Vacaville, and I-505 from Vacaville to I-5 near Dunnigan. I-5W and most of the other Interstates around the country with directional suffixes were eventually renumbered or eliminated. Nevertheless, San Francisco is still listed as a control city on northbound I-5 between SR 99 and I-580.

By the early 21st century, sections of I-5 had deteriorated due to a maintenance backlog as well as high traffic volumes. Several bridges in Oregon were reconstructed or repaired to accommodate use by heavy freight vehicles.

On May 23, 2013, a bridge span collapsed over the Skagit River in Mount Vernon, Washington, sending two cars into the water and requiring traffic in both directions to bypass the crossing. The Washington State Department of Transportation used a temporary structure to restore access across the river while a permanent bridge replacement was built. That process was completed September 15, 2013.

On December 18, 2017, an Amtrak train derailed on an overpass crossing I-5 near Tacoma, Washington, and blocked several lanes of traffic.

The I-5 corridor forms part of the West Coast Electric Highway, a partnership between the states of California, Oregon, and Washington to build and maintain a network of charging stations for electric vehicles. The pact was formed in 2009 and the first charging stations—spaced 25 to 50 miles (40 to 80 km) apart—opened in 2011. In 2019, the three states also broke ground on a similar charging network for electric trucks along I-5 called the West Coast Clean Transit Corridor Initiative. The program is a collaboration of nine utilities and two agencies representing municipal utilities, and aims to enable electric freight and delivery trucks to operate along the entire West Coast corridor.

== Junction list ==
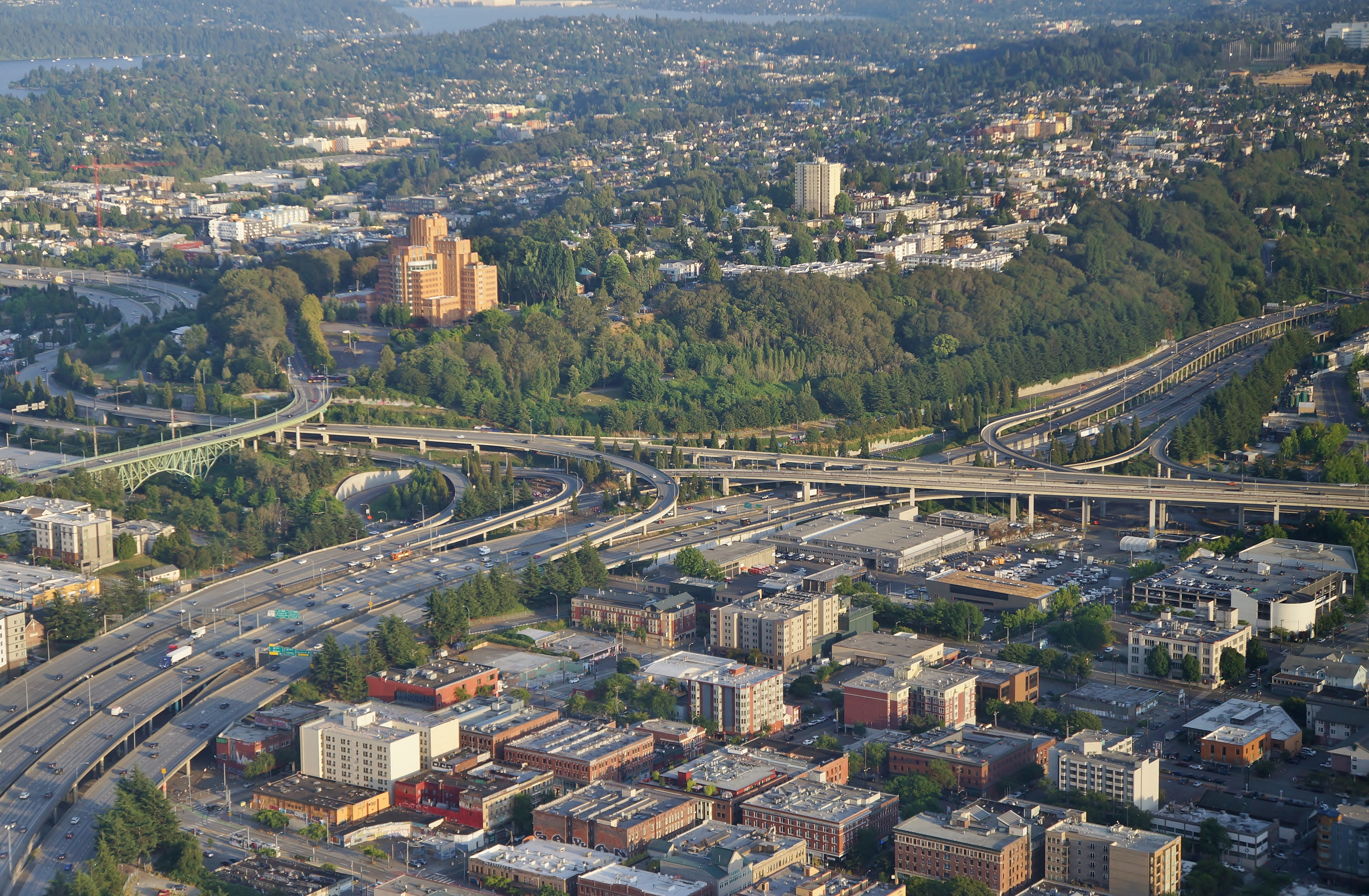
Aerial view of the I-5 and I-90 interchange in Seattle, seen from the Columbia Center.

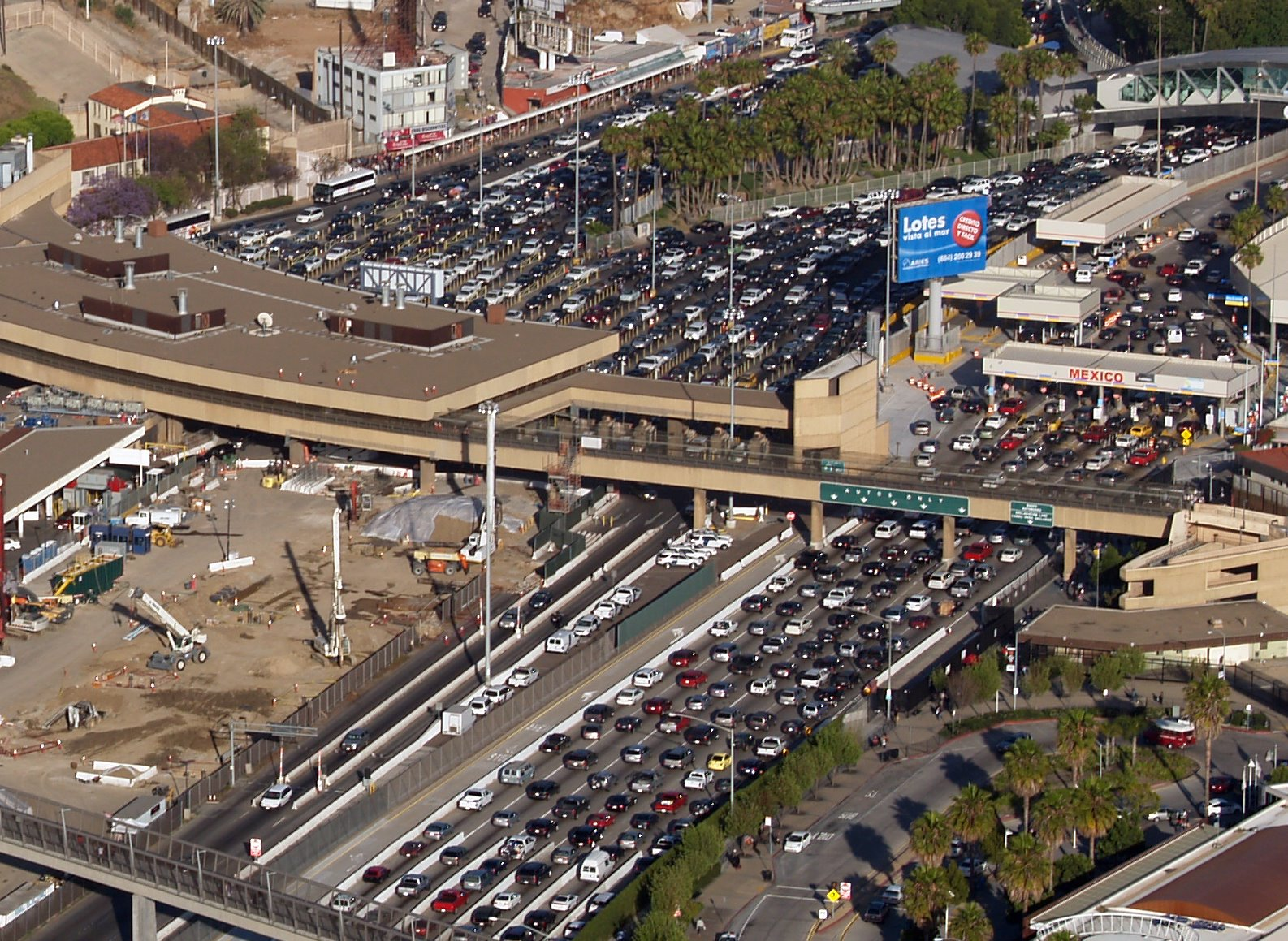
Aerial view of the former San Ysidro border crossing on the Mexican border, marking where I-5 continues south at Fed. 1

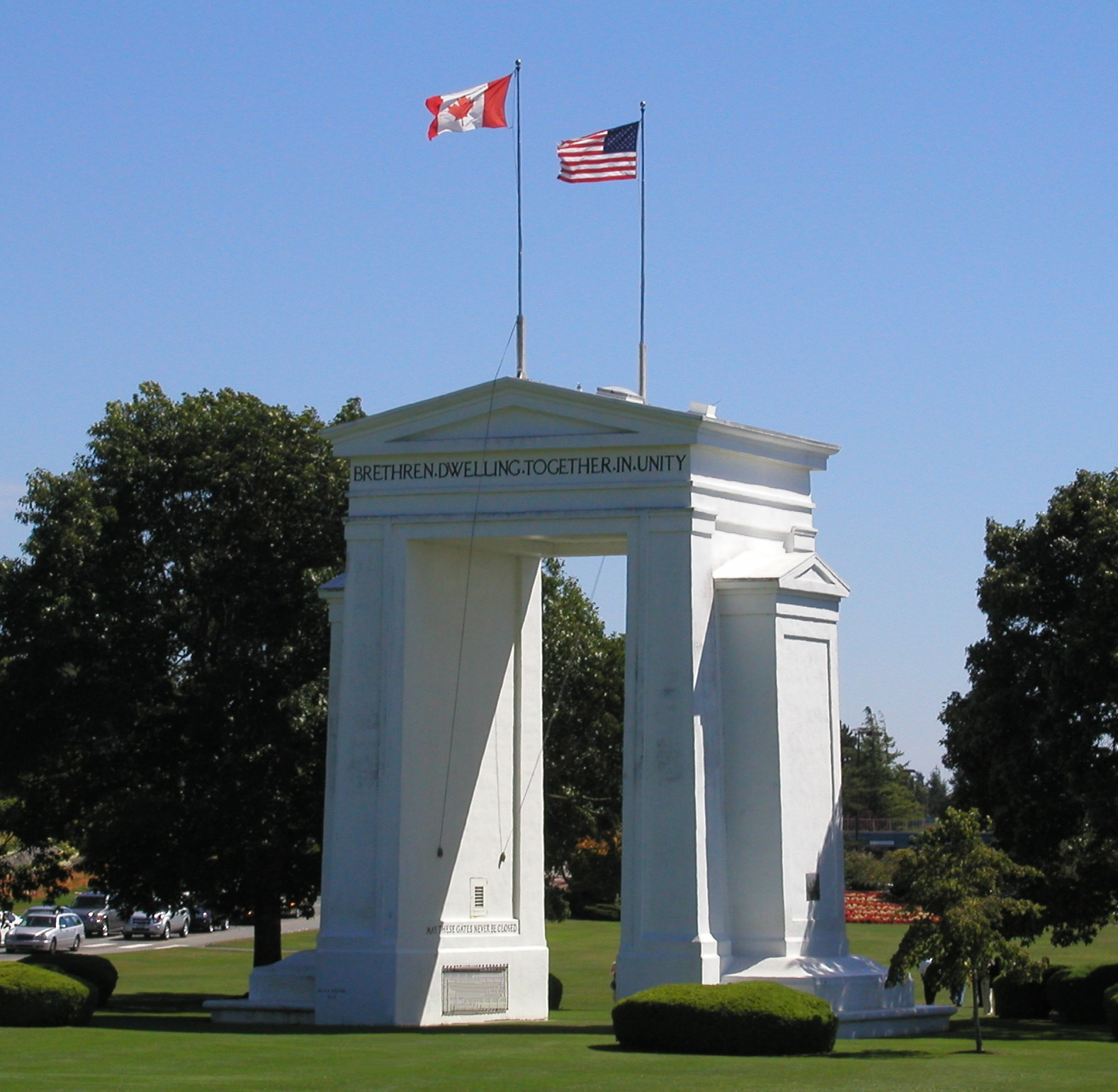
The Peace Arch monument on the Canada–United States border, marking where I-5 continues north as BC 99

California

- Fed. 1 at the Mexican border in San Diego
- I-805 in San Diego
- I-8 in San Diego
- I-805 in San Diego
- I-405 in Irvine
- I-605 on the Downey–Santa Fe Springs line
- I-710 in Commerce
- US 101 in Los Angeles
- I-10 in Los Angeles. The highways travel concurrently through the Boyle Heights neighborhood.
- I-405 in Los Angeles
- I-210 in Los Angeles
- I-580 southwest of Vernalis
- I-205 south-southwest of Lathrop
- I-305 / US 50 in Sacramento
- I-80 in Sacramento
- I-505 south-southeast of Dunnigan
- US 97 in Weed

Oregon

- US 199 east of Grants Pass
- I-105 on the Eugene–Springfield city line
- US 20 in Albany
- I-205 in Tualatin
- US 26 in Portland
- I-405 in Portland
- I-84 / US 30 in Portland. I-5/US 30 travels concurrently through Portland.
- I-405 / US 30 in Portland

Washington

- I-205 on the Salmon Creek–Mount Vista CDP line
- US 12 south-southeast of Napavine. The highways travel concurrently to Grand Mound.
- US 101 in Tumwater
- I-705 in Tacoma
- I-405 in Tukwila
- I-90 in Seattle
- I-405 in Lynnwood
- US 2 in Everett
- Highway 99 at the Canada–US border in Blaine

== Auxiliary routes ==
- San Diego, California—I-805
- Los Angeles, California—I-105 (not directly connected)
- Los Angeles and Orange County, California—I-405
- Los Angeles and Orange County, California—I-605
- Tracy, California—I-205
- Sacramento, California—I-305 (unsigned)
- Zamora, California—I-505
- Eugene, Oregon—I-105
- Portland, Oregon—I-405
- Portland, Oregon, and Vancouver, Washington—I-205
- Tacoma, Washington—I-705
- Seattle, Washington—I-405

I-5 will have a complete set of auxiliary routes (i.e. 105, 205, 305, 405, 505, 605, 705, 805, 905), with the designation of I-905 in San Diego County, a designation approved in 1984.

Several routes, including I-305 and I-505 in Oregon, were planned but left unbuilt due to local opposition.
