= California State Route 113 =

Highway in California

State Route 113
- SR 113 highlighted in red

Route information
- Maintained by Caltrans
- Length: 59 mi (95 km)

Major junctions
- South end: SR 12 near Rio Vista
- I-80 from Dixon to near Davis; I-5 in Woodland
- North end: SR 99 In Tudor

Location
- Country: United States
- State: California
- Counties: Solano, Yolo, Sutter

Highway system
- State highways in California; Interstate; US; State; Scenic; History; Pre‑1964; Unconstructed; Deleted; Freeways
← SR 112	→ SR 114

State Route 113 (SR 113) is an approximately 59-mile (95 km) north–south state highway in California that runs for approximately 10 miles (16 km) west of Rio Vista at SR 12 to SR 99 in Tudor. It is one of two major connecting routes between Interstate 80 (I-80) and I-5 that bypass Sacramento to the west, complementing I-505 farther to the west. Past the southern terminus are Collinsville and Birds Landing around the Suisun Bay marshes. Cities along the route include Dixon, Davis, and Woodland. It also shares a stretch of I-80 between Dixon and just outside UC Davis. The freeway section of SR 113 running between I-80 near UC Davis and I-5 in Woodland is officially designated as the Vic Fazio Highway, after the former U.S. House representative of the Davis area, who is credited with obtaining the funding for the freeway upgrade of that section. The remainder of SR 113 is a standard road of two to four lanes.

== Route description ==
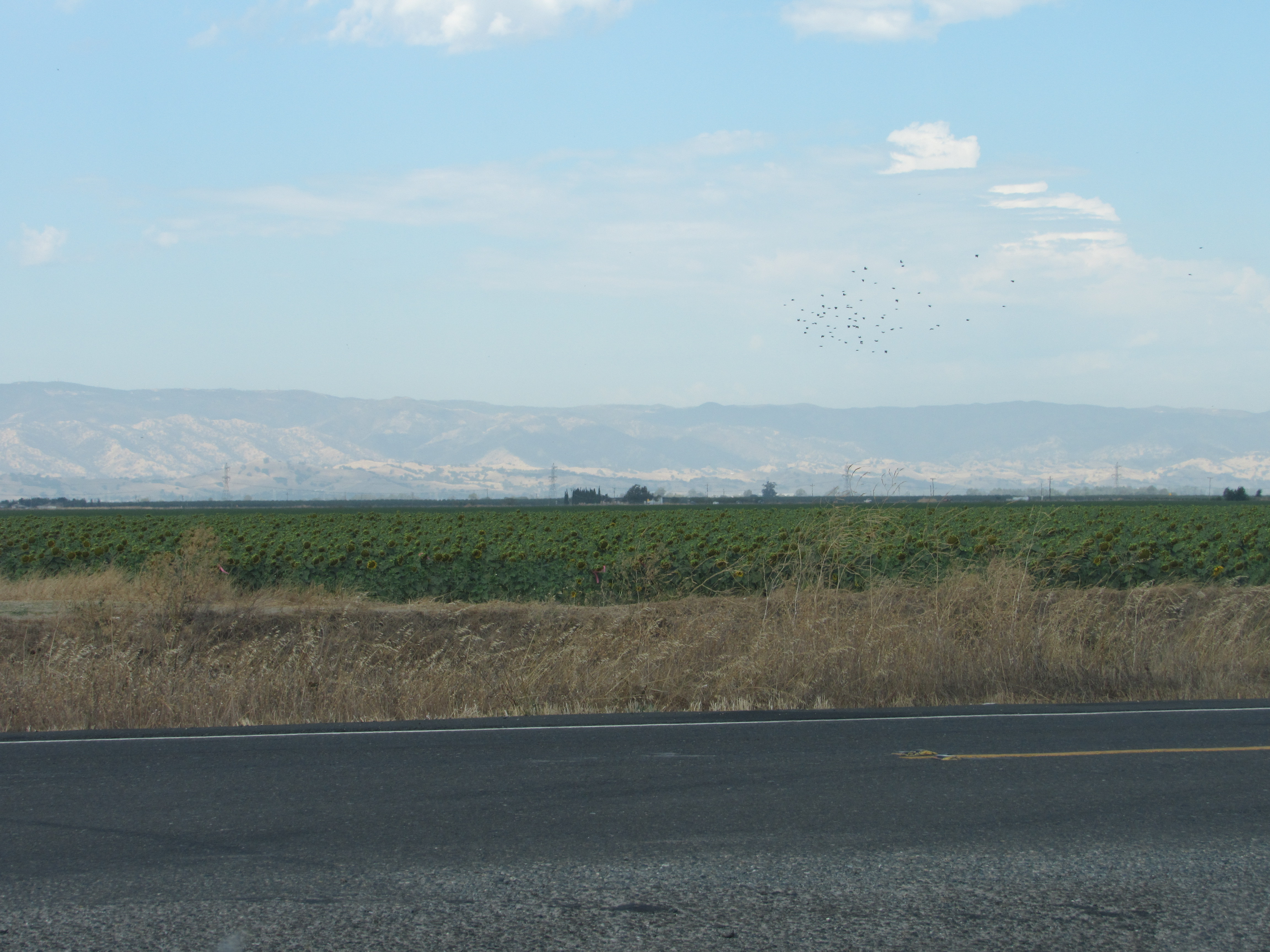
Sunflowers grow along SR 113

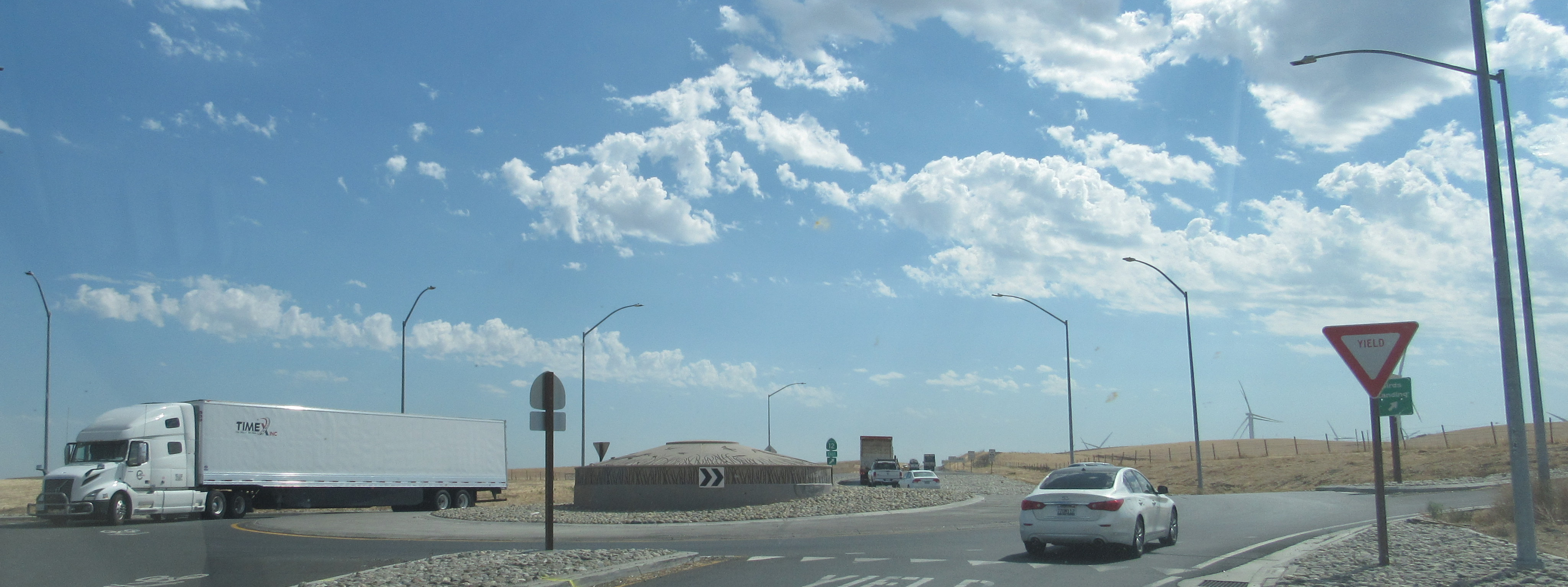
SR 12/SR 113 roundabout

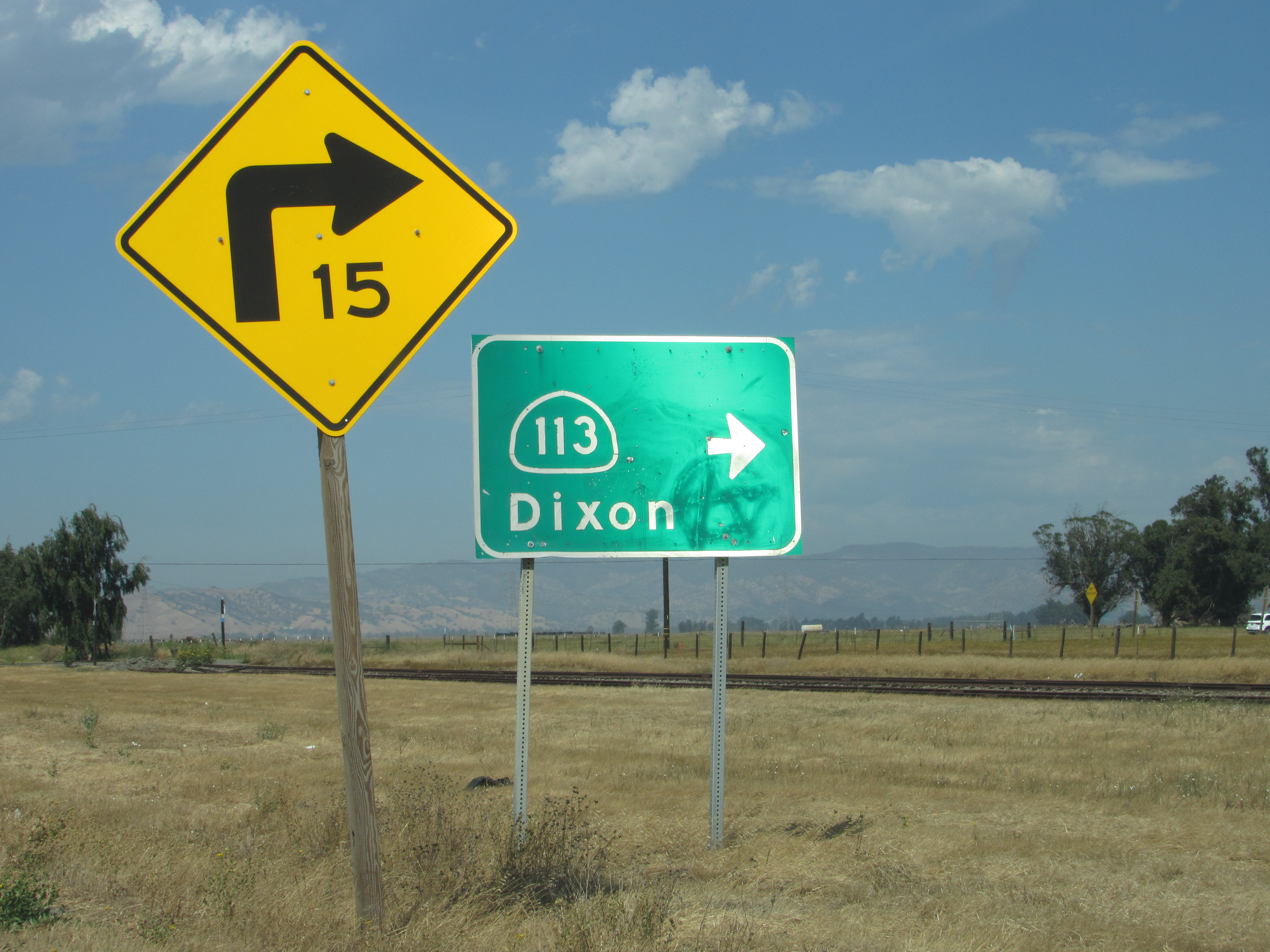
SR 113 to Dixon sign

SR 113 is defined as Route 113 in section 413 of the California Streets and Highways Code. The definition omits the concurrency with Route 80 instead of duplicating that segment in the other route's definition in the code:

Route 113 is from:
(a) Route 12 to Route 80 near Dixon.
(b) Route 80 near Davis to Route 99 passing near Woodland.

SR 113 begins at the intersection with SR 12 between Fairfield and Rio Vista. It heads north on a rural two-lane highway towards the city of Dixon. After heading through the center of the city, it expands to four lanes before reaching I-80. From there, SR 113 is co-routed along I-80, heading northeast towards the city of Davis. SR 113 then splits from I-80 onto its own freeway alignment, heading north near UC Davis. It is the four-lane freeway (known as the Vic Fazio Highway) connecting I-80 in Davis to I-5 in Woodland, thus rivaling I-505 farther west. After leaving Davis, SR 113 continues north through rural areas for a short stretch, entering Woodland approximately seven miles (11 km) afterward. Upon reaching I-5, it is co-routed for one mile (1.6 km) before splitting off the freeway. From that point, SR 113 leaves Woodland and again heads north on a rural two-lane highway, turning east and north again into the small community of Knights Landing, intersecting with SR 45. It then heads northeast through the small community of Robbins, then turns east to end at SR 99 towards Yuba City.

SR 113 is part of the California Freeway and Expressway System, and south of the northern city limits of Woodland is part of the National Highway System, a network of highways that are considered essential to the country's economy, defense, and mobility by the Federal Highway Administration.

== History ==
SR 113 was originally Legislative Route Number (LRN) 101 south of Dixon, defined in 1933; LRN 7 between Davis and Woodland, defined in 1909; and LRN 87 from Woodland to present-day SR 99, defined in 1933. The route was signed as SR 24 for much of its existence. In 1954, the segment from Tudor to Dixon was signed as U.S. Route 40 Alternate (Alt. US 40), part of a much longer route between US 395 and Dixon via the Feather River Canyon, now carried by SR 70, SR 20, SR 99, and SR 113. The latter was signed beginning in 1964 with the elimination of Alt. US 40. The section from Davis to Woodland was gradually updated to freeway standards in stages between 1973 and 1990.

The four-lane freeway known as the Vic Fazio Highway connecting I-80 in Davis to I-5 in Woodland was completed in 1990.

== Major intersections ==
Except where prefixed with a letter, postmiles were measured on the road as it was in 1964, based on the alignment that existed at the time, and do not necessarily reflect current mileage. Postmile prefixes include: R reflecting a realignment in the route since then, M indicating a second realignment, L referring to an overlap due to a correction or change, and T indicating postmiles classified as temporary. Segments that remain unconstructed or have been relinquished to local control may be omitted. The numbers reset at county lines; the start and end postmiles in each county are given in the county column.

County	Location	Postmile	Exit	Destinations	Notes
Solano; SOL 0.00-R22.45		0.00		Birds Landing Road – Birds Landing, Collinsville	Continuation beyond SR 12
Solano; SOL 0.00-R22.45		0.00		SR 12 – Rio Vista, Fairfield	Roundabout; south end of SR 113
Solano; SOL 0.00-R22.45		11.61		Fry Road – Elmira, Vacaville	
Solano; SOL 0.00-R22.45	Dixon	19.29		East A Street, West A Street	
Solano; SOL 0.00-R22.45	Dixon	19.96		North Adams Street	Former US 40 west
Solano; SOL 0.00-R22.45	Dixon	R21.24 38.21 (Note: Indicates that the postmile represents the distance along I-80 rather than SR 113.)		I-80 west / Currey Road – San Francisco	Interchange; south end of I-80 overlap; Currey Road is former US 40 east; I-80 east exit 66
Solano; SOL 0.00-R22.45	Dixon	R21.24 38.21	South end of freeway on I-80		
Solano; SOL 0.00-R22.45	Dixon		66B	Milk Farm Road	Southbound exit only
Solano; SOL 0.00-R22.45	Dixon	39.74	67	Pedrick Road (CR E7)	Southern terminus of CR E7
Solano; SOL 0.00-R22.45		41.30	69	Kidwell Road	
Solano; SOL 0.00-R22.45		42.67 R21.77	26B	I-80 east – Sacramento	North end of I-80 overlap; SR 113 north follows I-80 exit 70
Yolo; SOL 0.00-R22.45		R0.42	27	Hutchison Drive – UC Davis	
Yolo; SOL 0.00-R22.45	Davis	R1.08	28	Russell Boulevard – Davis	Former US 40 / US 99W
Yolo; SOL 0.00-R22.45	Davis	R2.08	29	Road 31, Covell Boulevard (CR E6)	Serves Sutter Davis Hospital
Yolo; SOL 0.00-R22.45	Davis	R4.11	31	Road 29	
Yolo; SOL 0.00-R22.45		R6.11	33	Road 27	
Yolo; SOL 0.00-R22.45		R7.67	34	Road 25A	Connects to former US 40 Alt. east / SR 113 north (East Street)
Yolo; SOL 0.00-R22.45	Woodland	R9.23	36	Gibson Road	Serves Dignity Health – Woodland Memorial Hospital
Yolo; SOL 0.00-R22.45	Woodland	R10.22	37	Main Street (I-5 BL) – Woodland	Former SR 16
Yolo; SOL 0.00-R22.45	Woodland	R10.72 R7.09 (Note: Indicates that the postmile represents the distance along I-5 rather than SR 113.)		I-5 south – Sacramento, Los Angeles	South end of I-5 overlap; southbound exit and northbound entrance; serves Sacramento International Airport; I-5 exit 537; northbound exit is via exit 37
Yolo; SOL 0.00-R22.45	Woodland	R8.26 11.30	North end of freeway on I-5		
Yolo; SOL 0.00-R22.45	Woodland	R8.26 11.30		I-5 north to SR 16 west / East Street – Redding	Interchange; north end of I-5 overlap; East Street is former US 40 Alt. west / SR 113 south; I-5 exit 538
Yolo; SOL 0.00-R22.45		18.66		CR E10 (Road 13) / CR E11 (Road 99E) – Zamora	Eastern terminus of CR E10; southern terminus of CR E11
Yolo; SOL 0.00-R22.45		M21.20		CR E8 (Road 102)	Northern terminus of CR E8
Yolo; SOL 0.00-R22.45	Knights Landing	21.90		SR 45 north (4th Street) – Grimes, Colusa	Southern terminus of SR 45
Sutter; SUT 0.00-16.38		16.38		SR 99 – Yuba City, Sacramento	Interchange; north end of SR 113; former US 40 Alt. east
Sutter; SUT 0.00-16.38		16.38		East Tudor Road	Continuation beyond SR 99; former SR 99 south
1.000 mi = 1.609 km; 1.000 km = 0.621 mi: Concurrency terminus; Incomplete access
