= California State Route 128 =

Highway in California from the Mendocino coast to the Sacramento Valley

State Route 128
- SR 128 highlighted in red

Route information
- Maintained by Caltrans
- Length: 120.52 mi (193.96 km)

Major junctions
- West end: SR 1 near Albion
- US 101 from Cloverdale to Geyserville; SR 29 from Calistoga to Rutherford; SR 121 in Moskowite Corner
- East end: I-505 in Winters

Location
- Country: United States
- State: California
- Counties: Mendocino, Sonoma, Napa, Solano, Yolo

Highway system
- State highways in California; Interstate; US; State; Scenic; History; Pre‑1964; Unconstructed; Deleted; Freeways
← SR 127	→ SR 129

State Route 128 (SR 128) is a state highway in the U.S. state of California, connecting the Mendocino coast to the Sacramento Valley, through the state's Wine Country. It runs from State Route 1 near Albion to Interstate 505 in Winters.

== Route description ==
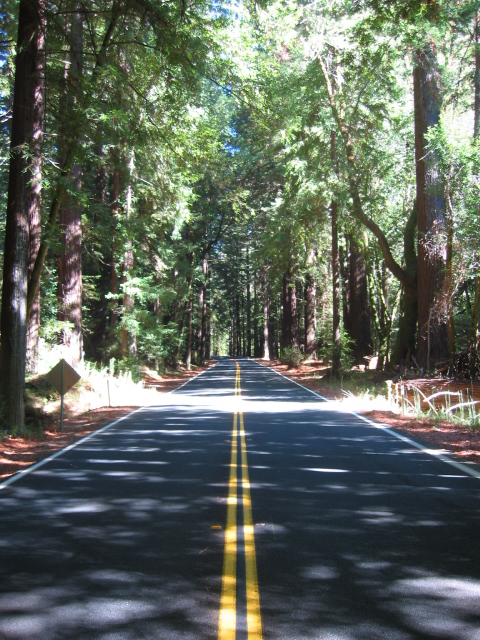
A relatively straight section of State Route 128 near Hendy Woods State Park

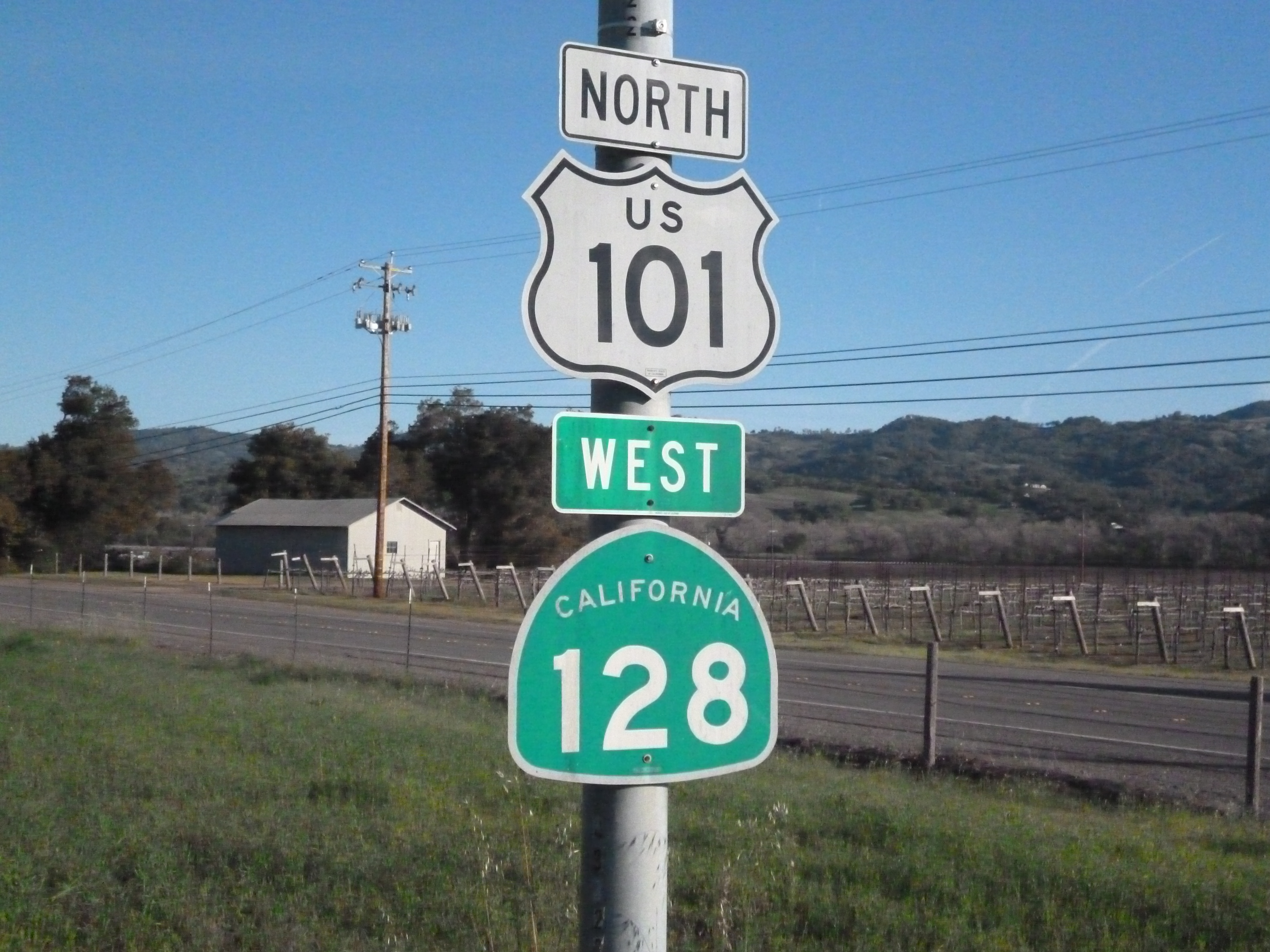
Highway marker showing cosign of US 101 and California Route 128

Route 128 is defined in section 428 of the California Streets and Highways Code. The definition omits the concurrencies with Route 101 and Route 29 instead of duplicating that segment in those other routes' definition in the code:

Route 128 is from:
(a) Route 1 near the mouth of the Navarro River to Route 101 near Cloverdale.
(b) Route 101 to Route 29 in Calistoga.
(c) Route 29 near Rutherford to Route 113 near Davis via Sage Canyon.

Route 128 begins at Route 1 near the mouth of the Navarro River at the Pacific Ocean. The highway travels southeast and upriver, through the coast redwood forests of Navarro River Redwoods State Park and through the vineyards and apple orchards of the Anderson Valley, to Boonville. Route 253, from Ukiah, has its western terminus into Route 128 at the south end of Boonville. Leaving Boonville, Route 128 climbs out of the Navarro River watershed and crosses the Yorkville Highlands before descending into the Russian River watershed, arriving at Cloverdale in the Alexander Valley, where the highway joins U.S. Route 101 heading south.

A few miles later, at Geyserville, Route 128 separates from U.S. 101 and continues southeast through Knights Valley on the way to Napa Valley, where it joins Route 29 at Calistoga. After passing through the town of St. Helena, Route 128 splits from Route 29 at Rutherford and climbs east over dry ridges above Lake Berryessa to the Sacramento Valley. In Winters, the route's constructed portion ends at Interstate 505. By its legal definition, the route continues 14 mi (23 km) east along Road 93A and Covell Blvd to Route 113 at Davis and then Mace Blvd to Interstate 80, but this segment is currently not constructed.

The section of Route 128 through Navarro River Redwoods State Park is often closed in winter storms due to flooding. Two slower alternate routes are available: the Philo-Greenwood road connects Route 1 near Elk to Route 128 near Hendy Woods State Park, a few miles north of Philo; another alternate route is the Comptche-Ukiah Road, which intersects Route 1 just south of the town of Mendocino and runs inland to Comptche, and departs Comptche on Flynn Creek Road, intersecting Route 128 just up river from the seasonal flood gate closing the highway.

SR 128 is part of the California Freeway and Expressway System, although it is mostly two lanes, but except for a small portion in Winters is not part of the National Highway System, a network of highways that are considered essential to the country's economy, defense, and mobility by the Federal Highway Administration.

== History ==
The main road through the Anderson Valley to the mouth of the Navarro River, and from there up the coast to Fort Bragg, was previously called the Navarro Highway; it followed the approximate route of the present Route 128 and Route 1 through Mendocino County. In the early 1900s the part of the highway north of Mountain House Road was also known as "MacDonald-to-the-Sea", after the owner of the hotel there. Even earlier, the road followed the Navarro Ridge, to the north of the present alignment, instead of staying at the river level. By 1938, the last stretches of old winding roadway near the present location of Navarro were replaced by a straighter alignment, taken over from a disused logging railway line.

Before being numbered as California State Route 128, the highway was signed as State Route 28. In 1952 it was renumbered State Route 128, permitting a different highway around Lake Tahoe to be numbered as Route 28 to coordinate its numbering with Nevada State Route 28.

== Major intersections ==
Except where prefixed with a letter, postmiles were measured on the road as it was in 1964, based on the alignment that existed at the time, and do not necessarily reflect current mileage. Postmile prefixes include: R reflecting a realignment in the route since then, M indicating a second realignment, L referring to an overlap due to a correction or change, and T indicating postmiles classified as temporary. Segments that remain unconstructed or have been relinquished to local control may be omitted. The numbers reset at county lines; the start and end postmiles in each county are given in the county column.

County	Location	Postmile	Exit	Destinations	Notes
Mendocino; MEN 0.00-50.90		0.00		SR 1 – Mendocino, Fort Bragg, Point Arena	West end of SR 128
Mendocino; MEN 0.00-50.90	Boonville	29.58		SR 253 east – Ukiah	West end of SR 253
Sonoma; SON 0.00-24.76				North Cloverdale Boulevard (US 101 Bus. south, SR 128 Bus. east) – Cloverdale	West end of US 101 Bus. overlap
Sonoma; SON 0.00-24.76		L4.86 R53.40 (Note: Indicates that the postmile represents the distance along US 101 rather than SR 128.)		US 101 north (Redwood Highway) – Eureka	Interchange; east end of US 101 Bus. overlap; west end of US 101 overlap; US 101 exit 522
Sonoma; SON 0.00-24.76		L4.86 R53.40	West end of freeway on US 101		
Sonoma; SON 0.00-24.76	Cloverdale	R51.62	520	Citrus Fair Drive	
Sonoma; SON 0.00-24.76	Cloverdale	R50.43	519	South Cloverdale Boulevard (US 101 Bus. north, SR 128 Bus. west)	
Sonoma; SON 0.00-24.76		R49.05	518	Dutcher Creek Road – Stewarts Point	
Sonoma; SON 0.00-24.76		R47.85	517	Asti (Asti Road)	
Sonoma; SON 0.00-24.76	Geyserville	43.37 L4.86	East end of freeway on US 101		
Sonoma; SON 0.00-24.76	Geyserville	43.37 L4.86		US 101 south (Redwood Highway) / Canyon Road – San Francisco	Interchange; east end of US 101 overlap; US 101 exit 512
Napa; NAP 0.00-34.27		2.66		Tubbs Lane – Middletown, Lakeport	
Napa; NAP 0.00-34.27	Calistoga	3.62		Petrified Forest Road – Santa Rosa	
Napa; NAP 0.00-34.27	Calistoga	4.55 36.89 (Note: Indicates that the postmile represents the distance along SR 29 rather than SR 128.)		SR 29 north (Lincoln Avenue) – Lakeport, Downtown Calistoga	West end of SR 29 overlap
Napa; NAP 0.00-34.27	Rutherford	24.60 4.56		SR 29 south – Napa	East end of SR 29 overlap
Napa; NAP 0.00-34.27		7.37		Silverado Trail – St. Helena, Calistoga, Napa	
Napa; NAP 0.00-34.27		11.28		Chiles Pope Valley Road – Pope Valley	
Napa; NAP 0.00-34.27		23.90		SR 121 south (Monticello Road) – Napa	North end of SR 121
Solano; SOL 0.00-0.75	No major junctions				
Yolo; YOL 0.00-9.84	Winters	8.77		Railroad Avenue – Madison, Downtown Winters	
Yolo; YOL 0.00-9.84		9.84		I-505 – Redding, Vacaville	Interchange; east end of SR 128; I-505 exit 11
Yolo; YOL 0.00-9.84		9.84		CR E6 (Russell Boulevard) – Davis	Continuation beyond I-505; west end of CR E6
1.000 mi = 1.609 km; 1.000 km = 0.621 mi: Concurrency terminus
