= California State Route 253 =

Highway in Mendocino County, California

State Route 253

- Map of Mendocino County in northwestern California with SR 253 highlighted in red

Route information
- Maintained by Caltrans
- Length: 17.180 mi (27.649 km)

Major junctions
- West end: SR 128 at Boonville
- East end: US 101 in Ukiah

Location
- Country: United States
- State: California
- Counties: Mendocino

Highway system
- State highways in California; Interstate; US; State; Scenic; History; Pre‑1964; Unconstructed; Deleted; Freeways
← SR 252	→ SR 254

State Route 253 (SR 253), also known as the Ukiah–Boonville Road, is a state highway in the U.S. state of California that runs between the Anderson and Ukiah valleys in Mendocino County. It crosses the mountains of the Mendocino Range from State Route 128 near Boonville to U.S. Route 101 near Ukiah.

== Route description ==
Route 253 is defined in section 553 of the California Streets and Highways Code, and that the highway is "from Route 128 near Boonville to Route 101 near Ukiah".

SR 253 begins in Boonville at an at-grade intersection with SR 128. The road heads eastward through a forested and mountainous area for approximately fifteen miles before entering the Russian River Basin, an area of numerous farms. The road ends with an interchange with U.S. Route 101 in southern Ukiah.

SR 253 is not part of the National Highway System, a network of highways that are considered essential to the country's economy, defense, and mobility by the Federal Highway Administration.

== History ==
This route, under the name of the Ukiah-Boonville Road, has been in use as a road since at least 1897, when it was the scene of the robbery of a stage coach carrying the payrolls for a coastal lumber mill. However, it was not until 1963 that it was added to the state highway system. It was given its present number in the 1964 state highway renumbering.

== Major intersections ==
Except where prefixed with a letter, postmiles were measured on the road as it was in 1964, based on the alignment that existed at the time, and do not necessarily reflect current mileage. Postmile prefixes include: R reflecting a realignment in the route since then, M indicating a second realignment, L referring to an overlap due to a correction or change, and T indicating postmiles classified as temporary. Segments that remain unconstructed or have been relinquished to local control may be omitted. The entire route is in Mendocino County.

Location	Postmile	Destinations	Notes
Boonville	0.00	SR 128 – Boonville, Cloverdale	West end of SR 253
Ukiah	17.18	US 101 – Santa Rosa, Eureka	Interchange; east end of SR 253; US 101 exit 546
Ukiah	17.18	State Street – Ukiah	Continuation beyond US 101
1.000 mi = 1.609 km; 1.000 km = 0.621 mi
