= Tudor, California =

Unincorporated community in California, United States

- Unincorporated community
- Location within California Location within the United States
- Coordinates: 39°00′18″N 121°37′25″W
- Country: United States
- State: California
- County: Sutter
- Elevation: 43 ft (13 m)
- Time zone: UTC-8 (Pacific (PST))
  - Summer (DST): UTC-7 (PDT)
- Area code: 530
- GNIS feature ID: 1660038

Tudor is an unincorporated community in Sutter County, California, United States.

== History ==
In the early twentieth century, Tudor was a major center of bean farming, with lima, kidney, and blackeye beans grown in the area.

== Geography ==
Tudor is on California State Routes 99 and 113, 10 miles (16 km) south of Yuba City.

== Education ==
Tudor is served by the Yuba City Unified School District. Kids in the area attend Barry Elementary School and Yuba City High School.
