= Sloughhouse, California =

Unincorporated community in California, United States

- Unincorporated community
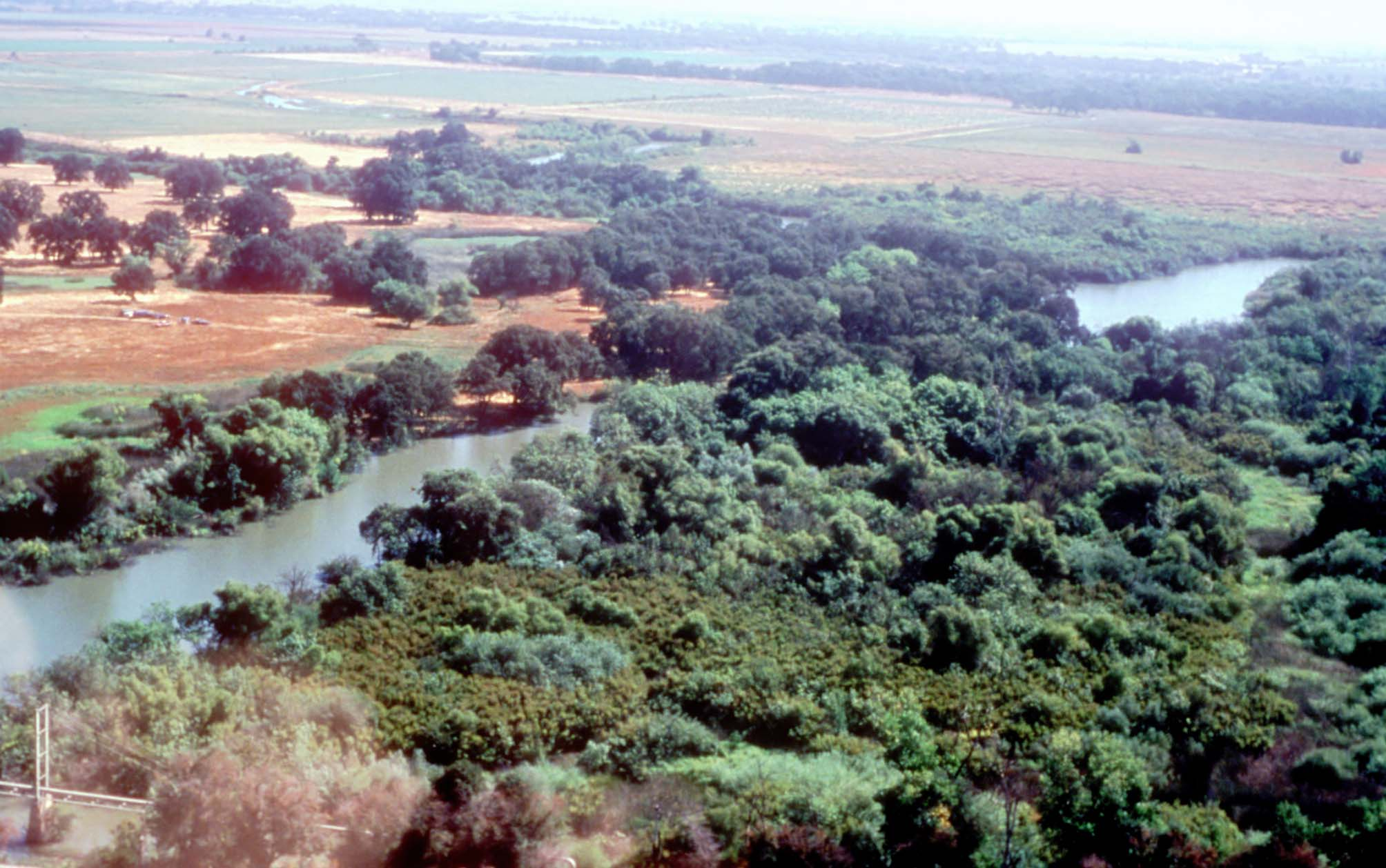
- Cosumnes River near Sloughhouse

- Location within California Location within the United States
- Coordinates: 38°29′45″N 121°11′38″W
- Country: United States
- State: California
- County: Sacramento
- Elevation: 102 ft (31 m)
- Time zone: UTC-8 (Pacific (PST))
  - Summer (DST): UTC-7 (PDT)
- ZIP code: 95683
- Area codes: 916, 279
- GNIS feature ID: 1659683

California Historical Landmark
- Reference no.: 575

Sloughhouse's Deer Creek bridge in 1860

Sloughhouse is an unincorporated community in Sacramento County, California, United States. Sloughhouse is located on California State Route 16, approximately 17 miles (27 km) east-southeast of downtown Sacramento. Sloughhouse has a post office with ZIP code 95683, which was established in 1916. Jared Sheldon, who built a roadhouse, hotel and stagecoach station in the community in 1850, named the community after another building he had built nearby. The roadhouse was destroyed by a fire in 1890, but was rebuilt. The site is registered as a California Historical Landmark No. 575.

== Climate ==
According to the Köppen Climate Classification system, Sloughhouse has a warm-summer Mediterranean climate, abbreviated "Csa" on climate maps.
