= Freeport, California =

Freeport
- Census-designated place
- Location of Freeport in Sacramento County, California.

- Location in California
- Coordinates: 38°27′43″N 121°30′06″W
- Country: United States
- State: California
- County: Sacramento County

Area
  - Total: 0.051 sq mi (0.131 km^{2})
  - Land: 0.051 sq mi (0.131 km^{2})
  - Water: 0 sq mi (0 km^{2}) 0%
- Elevation: 18 ft (5.5 m)

Population (2020)
  - Total: 58
  - Density: 1,100/sq mi (440/km^{2})
- Time zone: UTC-8 (Pacific (PST))
  - Summer (DST): UTC-7 (PDT)
- FIPS code: 06-25590

Freeport is a census-designated place (CDP) in Sacramento County, California, United States, located approximately 7.5 miles (12.1 km) south of downtown Sacramento on California State Route 160. It is part of the Sacramento–Arden-Arcade–Roseville Metropolitan Statistical Area. Freeport lies on the eastern banks of the Sacramento River. The population was 58 at the 2020 census.

== History ==
Nearly all goods traveling to Sacramento and the California Gold Rush came by boat from the Bay Area. In the early 1860s businessmen grew tired of paying taxes at the Sacramento Embarcadero (port). In 1862 Freeport Railroad Company was created with the idea of building a new port that was free of taxes. Hence “Freeport.” The idea was to build a railway that bypassed Sacramento connecting with the Sacramento Valley Railroad at a midway point between Sacramento and Folsom. The newly formed town boomed for three years with populations reaching 300–400.

== Geography ==
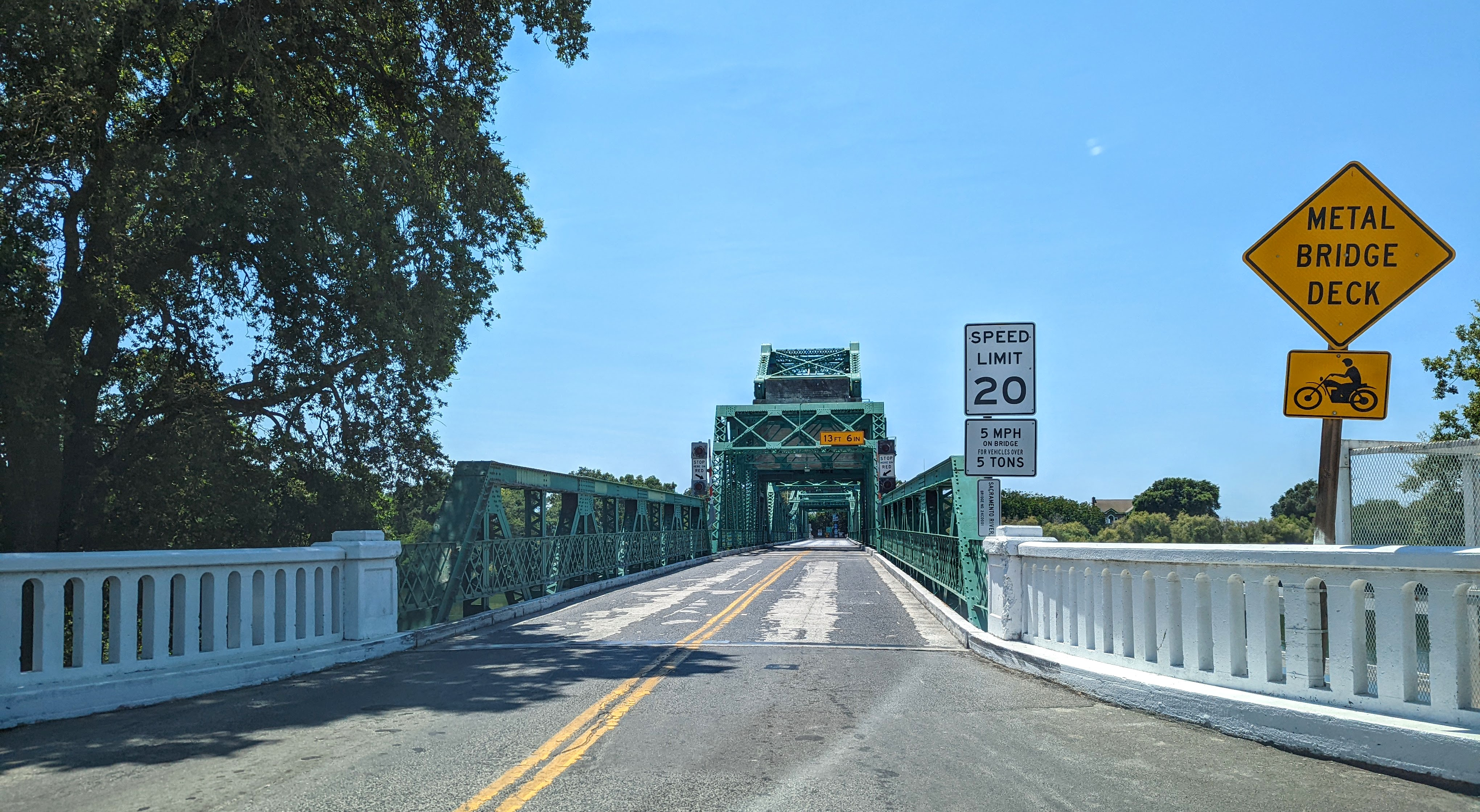
The Freeport Bridge, looking west across the Sacramento River, from Sacramento County to Yolo County

According to the United States Census Bureau, the CDP covers an area of 0.05 square mile (0.1 km^{2}), all land.

== Demographics ==
Historical population
Census	Pop.	Note	%±
2010	38		—
2020	58		52.6%
U.S. Decennial Census; 1850–1870 1880-1890; 1900 1910 1920; 1930 1940 1950; 1960 1970 1980; 1990 2000 2010

Freeport first appeared as a census designated place in the 2010 U.S. census.

The 2020 United States census reported that Freeport had a population of 58. The population density was 1,137.3 inhabitants per square mile (439.1/km^{2}). The racial makeup of Freeport was 43 (74%) White, 0 (0%) African American, 1 (2%) Native American, 0 (0%) Asian, 0 (0%) Pacific Islander, 7 (12%) from other races, and 7 (12%) from two or more races. Hispanic or Latino of any race were 18 persons (31%).

The whole population lived in households. There were 24 households, out of which 1 (4%) had children under the age of 18 living in them, 3 (13%) were married-couple households, 2 (8%) were cohabiting couple households, 4 (17%) had a female householder with no partner present, and 15 (63%) had a male householder with no partner present. 10 households (42%) were one person, and 2 (8%) were one person aged 65 or older. The average household size was 2.42. There were 10 families (42% of all households).

The age distribution was 13 people (22%) under the age of 18, 1 person (2%) aged 18 to 24, 10 people (17%) aged 25 to 44, 18 people (31%) aged 45 to 64, and 16 people (28%) who were 65 years of age or older. The median age was 49.5 years. There were 25 males and 33 females.

There were 28 housing units at an average density of 549.0 units per square mile (212.0 units/km^{2}), of which 24 (86%) were occupied. Of these, 12 (50%) were owner-occupied, and 12 (50%) were occupied by renters.
