= California State Route 16 =

State highway in California, United States

State Route 16
- The signed portion of SR 16 highlighted in red

Route information
- Maintained by Caltrans
- Length: 111.17 mi (178.91 km) (includes 28.82 mi (46.38 km) on I-5 and US 50)
- Existed: 1934–present

Section 1
- West end: SR 20 near Rumsey
- Major intersections: I-505 near Winters; I-5 BL / CR E7 in Woodland
- East end: I-5 in Woodland

Section 2
- West end: US 50 in Sacramento
- Major intersections: CR E2 near Sloughhouse; SR 124 near Drytown
- East end: SR 49 near Drytown

Location
- Country: United States
- State: California
- Counties: Colusa, Yolo, Sacramento, Amador

Highway system
- State highways in California; Interstate; US; State; Scenic; History; Pre‑1964; Unconstructed; Deleted; Freeways
| ← SR 15 | → SR 17 |

State Route 16 (SR 16) is a state highway in the northern region of the U.S. state of California that primarily crosses the Sacramento Valley. It consists of two discontinuous segments. The western segment runs from SR 20 in Colusa County to Interstate 5 (I-5) in Woodland. The eastern segment then runs from U.S. Route 50 (US 50) in Sacramento to SR 49 just outside Plymouth in Amador County. The gap in SR 16 through Sacramento can be transversed along I-5 and US 50.

== Route description ==
Route 16 is defined in section 316, subdivision (a), of the California Streets and Highways Code. The definition omits the gap in the route in the Sacramento area:

Route 16 is from:
(1) Route 20 to Route 5 near Woodland via Rumsey and Woodland.
(2) Route 50 near Perkins to Route 49 near Drytown.

In addition, section 316, subdivisions (b), (c), and (d) permit the state to relinquish control of portions of Route 16 in the City of Sacramento, unincorporated Sacramento County, and the City of Rancho Cordova, respectively, to local jurisdictions.

SR 16 is part of the California Freeway and Expressway System, and the eastern segment is part of the National Highway System, a network of highways that are considered essential to the country's economy, defense, and mobility by the Federal Highway Administration. SR 16 is eligible to be included in the State Scenic Highway System, but it is not officially designated as a scenic highway by the California Department of Transportation (Caltrans). It is known as the Stanley L. Van Vleck Memorial Highway from Dillard Road in Sacramento County to the Amador County line, honoring a former prominent leader in the state's agricultural organizations.

=== Western segment ===
SR 16 begins in Colusa County near Wilbur Springs at the junction with SR 20. SR 16 goes south alongside Bear Creek, which enters a narrow canyon and joins with Cache Creek near the Yolo County line. The highway continues in the canyon, running close to the river, passing Cache Creek Canyon Regional Park, and emerging from the canyon north of Rumsey. This section is so prone to rock slides that there are permanent gates at each end.

SR 16 continues to parallel Cache Creek, at a greater distance, going south-east through Capay Valley, with Blue Ridge to its west and the Capay Hills (including Bald Mountain) to its east. It goes through Rumsey, Guinda, Brooks, Cache Creek Casino Resort, Capay, Esparto (intersecting with County Route E4 [CR E4] to Dunnigan), and Madison.

East of Madison, and now in the Central Valley, SR 16 interchanges with I-505 before heading east toward Woodland. In west Woodland, it merges with County Road 22 and then turns north, concurrently with CR E7 and I-5 Business, until it meets its interchange with I-5, where its western segment ends.

=== Eastern segment ===
The eastern segment begins at US 50, heading southbound on Howe Ave for a very short distance, then runs eastbound on Folsom Boulevard. SR 16 then peels off from Folsom Boulevard, less than one mile (1.6 km) afterward as Jackson Road. After it passes near Sloughhouse and Rancho Murieta, where it crosses the Cosumnes River, SR 16 enters Amador County. SR 16 then ascends into the Sierra Nevada foothills, leaving the Central Valley. In Amador County, SR 16 passes near Forest Home before intersecting with SR 124 and terminating at SR 49.

== History ==
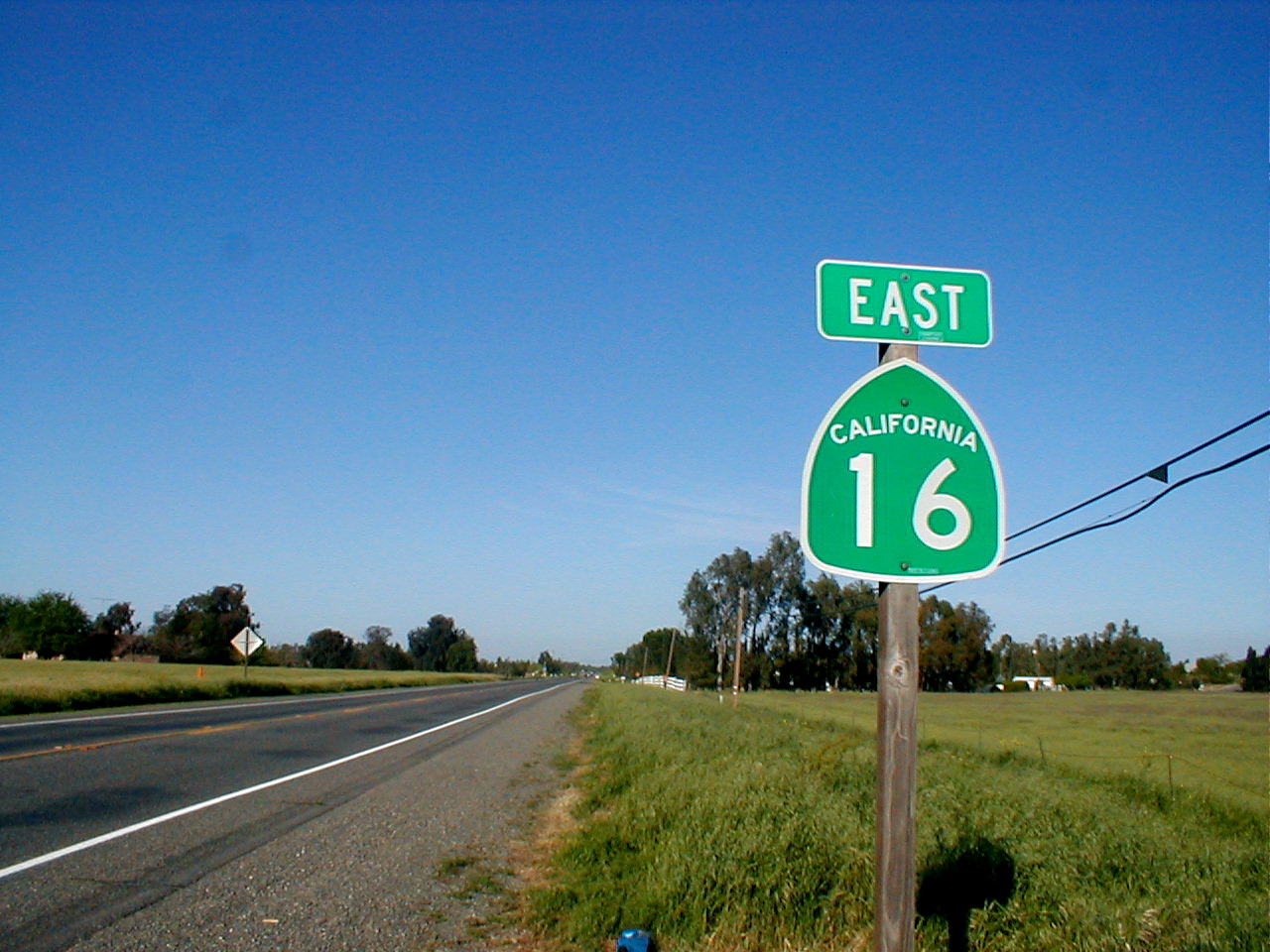
SR 16 heading east through Yolo County, California.

The two ends of SR 16 were added to the state highway system by the third bond issue, passed by the state's voters in 1919: Route 50 from Lower Lake east to Rumsey and Route 54 from the Sacramento-Amador County line east to Drytown. Each was connected to Sacramento by existing or planned paved county highways. Although the exact alignment of Route 50 was not specified, the state Department of Engineering had already surveyed a 35-mile (56 km) route through Cache Creek Canyon pursuant to a 1915 law, which defined the Yolo and Lake Highway "following generally, the meanderings of Cache creek" but did not make it a state highway. By 1924, the California Highway Commission's engineers had realized that building Route 50 through the canyon was impractical, and adopted a substitute plan for two highways connecting Lower Lake and Rumsey with the planned Route 15 (Tahoe–Ukiah Highway, now SR 20) to the north in September 1925. The western connection, to Lower Lake, became part of Route 49 (now SR 53 there), which continued south from Lower Lake to Calistoga.

Each route was extended to Sacramento in 1933 over the aforementioned county highways, taking Route 50 southeast from Rumsey to Woodland near Cache Creek and then alongside the Sacramento River to the I Street Bridge, and Route 54 west from the county line to Route 11 just outside Sacramento. The entirety of both routes, from SR 20 near Wilbur Springs through Sacramento to SR 49 just north of Drytown (and initially overlapping SR 49 to Jackson), was included in the initial state sign route system in 1934 as Sign Route 16. Through downtown Sacramento, SR 16 followed US 40 (Legislative Route 6) and US 50 (Legislative Route 11), mostly on Capitol Avenue, while Legislative Route 50 continued south on 5th Street (later a one-way pair of 3rd and 5th Streets) and turned east on Broadway, carrying Sign Route 24 most of the way to Freeport Boulevard.

In the 1964 renumbering, Route 16 became the new legislative designation, and Sign Route 24 through Sacramento was replaced with SR 99 and SR 160. As neither of these used what had been Sign Route 24 along 3rd and 5th Streets and Broadway, part of Route 16's new definition ("Route 5 near Woodland to Sacramento") was used for several years on this alignment until it became part of SR 99 later that decade. This left the western segment of SR 16 ending at I-5 near the east end of the I Street Bridge until 1984, when the Woodland–Sacramento portion, which had become redundant with the parallel I-5 complete, was deleted from the legislative definition. After this, SR 16 was rerouted from the intersection with CR E7 to continue north on a bypass of Woodland instead of east to I-5.

On September 15, 2014, Assembly Bill No. 1957 was passed, authorizing relinquishment of the segment of SR 16 in Eastern Sacramento near US 50.

== Major intersections ==
Except where prefixed with a letter, postmiles were measured on the road as it was in 1964, based on the alignment that existed at the time, and do not necessarily reflect current mileage. Postmile prefixes include: R reflecting a realignment in the route since then, M indicating a second realignment, L referring to an overlap due to a correction or change, and T indicating postmiles classified as temporary. Segments that remain unconstructed or have been relinquished to local control may be omitted. The numbers reset at county lines; the start and end postmiles in each county are given in the county column.

| County | Location | Postmile | Destinations | Notes |
|---|---|---|---|---|
| Colusa; COL 0.00-7.26 | | 0.00 | SR 20 – Williams, Clearlake, Ukiah | West end of SR 16 |
| Yolo; YOL 0.00-R43.42 | Capay | | CR E4 (Road 85) – Dunnigan | Southern terminus of CR E4 |
| Yolo; YOL 0.00-R43.42 | | 32.23 | I-505 – Redding, Vacaville | Interchange; I-505 exit 21 |
| Yolo; YOL 0.00-R43.42 | Woodland | R40.57 | I-5 BL south (West Main Street) / CR E7 (Road 98) | West end of I-5 BL overlap; northern terminus of CR E7; West Main Street is former SR 16 east; CR E7 (Road 98) serves Dignity Health – Woodland Memorial Hospital |
| Yolo; YOL 0.00-R43.42 | | R43.42 | I-5 north / Road 18 – Redding | Interchange; east end of I-5 BL overlap and western segment of SR 16; west end of I-5 overlap; I-5 exit 541 |
Gap in route
| Sacramento; SAC T1.66-R23.96 | Sacramento | T1.66 | US 50 east (El Dorado Freeway) / Howe Avenue – South Lake Tahoe | Interchange; west end of eastern segment of SR 16; US 50 exit 9 |
| Sacramento; SAC T1.66-R23.96 | Sacramento | T1.95 | Folsom Boulevard west, Power Inn Road | Former SR 16 west / US 50 west |
| Sacramento; SAC T1.66-R23.96 | Sacramento | T2.53 | Folsom Boulevard east, Notre Dame Drive | Former US 50 east |
| Sacramento; SAC T1.66-R23.96 | Rancho Cordova | R11.47 | CR E2 (Sunrise Boulevard) | |
| Amador; AMA R0.00-9.37 | | 9.09 | SR 124 – Ione | Northern terminus of SR 124 |
| Amador; AMA R0.00-9.37 | | 9.37 | SR 49 – Plymouth, Placerville, Sutter Creek, Jackson | East end of SR 16 |
1.000 mi = 1.609 km; 1.000 km = 0.621 mi: Concurrency terminus
