= Pleasant Valley, California =

Unincorporated community in California, United States

Pleasant Valley
- Unincorporated community
- Location in California Pleasant Valley (the United States)
- Coordinates: 38°40′59″N 120°39′47″W
- Country: United States
- State: California
- County: El Dorado
- Elevation: 2,460 ft (750 m)

Pleasant Valley is an unincorporated community in El Dorado County, California, United States. It is located 3.5 miles (6 km) south of Camino, at an elevation of 2461 feet (750 m).

A post office operated at Pleasant Valley from 1864 to 1917.
