= Interstate 505 =

Interstate Highway in California

Interstate 505
- I-505 highlighted in red

Route information
- Auxiliary route of I-5
- Maintained by Caltrans
- Length: 32.99 mi (53.09 km)
- Existed: 1977–present
- NHS: Entire route

Major junctions
- South end: I-80 in Vacaville
- SR 128 near Winters; SR 16 near Madison
- North end: I-5 near Dunnigan

Location
- Country: United States
- State: California
- Counties: Solano, Yolo

Highway system
- Interstate Highway System; Main; Auxiliary; Suffixed; Business; Future; State highways in California; Interstate; US; State; Scenic; History; Pre‑1964; Unconstructed; Deleted; Freeways
← SR 480	→ I-580

Interstate 505 (I-505) is a north–south auxiliary Interstate Highway in the Sacramento Valley in Northern California. It is a spur auxiliary route of I-5 that runs from near Dunnigan south to I-80 in Vacaville. I-505 is primarily a rural Interstate, but travels through Vacaville and the city of Winters. The highway is the primary route connecting the San Francisco Bay Area and the northern Sacramento Valley, bypassing Sacramento and its attendant city traffic. Thus, it is a major route for travelers heading directly from the San Francisco Bay Area to the Shasta Cascade and the Pacific Northwest.

== Route description ==
The entirety of I-505 is defined in section 617 of the California Streets and Highways Code as Route 505, and that the highway is from "Route 80 near Vacaville to Route 5 near Dunnigan". This definition roughly corresponds with the Federal Highway Administration (FHWA)'s route logs of I-505.

The southern terminus of I-505 is at I-80 next to the Nut Tree Airport in the Nut Tree area in Vacaville. From there, it travels north about 10 miles (16 km) through rural areas near the western edge of the Sacramento Valley before reaching Winters. I-505 then skirts the eastern city limits of Winters, intersecting with State Route 128—the only exit in Winters. After leaving that city, the Interstate then proceeds north through rural areas again for about 20 miles (32 km), including an interchange with California State Route 16 near Madison, until it reaches its northern terminus with I-5 near Dunnigan.

For its entire length, I-505 is a four-lane freeway (two lanes in each direction) with a maximum speed limit of 70 mph (110 km/h), which is typical for rural Interstates in California.

I-505 is part of the California Freeway and Expressway System, and is part of the National Highway System, a network of highways that are considered essential to the country's economy, defense, and mobility by the Federal Highway Administration.

== History ==
What is now I-505 was originally conceived as part of a loop Interstate with a directional suffix, I-5W. However, I-5W and most of the other Interstates around the country with directional suffixes were eventually renumbered or eliminated, except I-35E and I-35W in Texas and Minnesota. I-69 segments I-69W, I-69C, and I-69E in southern Texas have since been designated as well along with proposed suffixed segments for future extensions of I-14 and I-27 to follow. The former route of I-5W now corresponds to I-580 from I-5 south of Tracy to Oakland, I-80 from Oakland to Vacaville, and I-505 from Vacaville to I-5 near Dunnigan.

The northernmost section of I-505, between SR 16 in Madison and I-5 near Dunnigan, opened in August 1977.

== Exit list ==
County	Location	mi	km	Exit	Destinations	Notes
Solano	Vacaville	0.00	0.00	1A	I-80 west – San Francisco	Southern terminus; I-80 exit 56
Solano	Vacaville	0.00	0.00	—	Orange Drive / Nut Tree Road	Northbound exit (only accessible from I-80 east) and entrance
Solano	Vacaville	0.00	0.00	1B	I-80 east – Sacramento	Southbound exit and northbound entrance; provides direct access to East Monte Vista Avenue; I-80 exit 56
Solano	Vacaville	1.45	2.33	1C	Vaca Valley Parkway	Signed as exit 1 northbound; serves Kaiser Permanente Vacaville Medical Center
Solano	Vacaville	3.06	4.92	3	Midway Road	
Solano		5.57	8.96	6	Allendale Road	
Solano		10.43	16.79	10	Putah Creek Road	
Yolo		11.03	17.75	11	SR 128 west (Grant Avenue) / Russell Boulevard (CR E6 east) – Winters, Davis	Eastern terminus of SR 128; western terminus of CR E6
Yolo		14.66	23.59	15	Road 29A	
Yolo		17.16	27.62	17	Road 27	
Yolo		21.25	34.20	21	SR 16 – Woodland, Esparto	
Yolo		24.06	38.72	24	Road 19	
Yolo		28.08	45.19	28	Road 14 (CR E10) – Zamora	
Yolo		30.74	49.47	31	Road 12A	
Yolo		32.99	53.09	—	I-5 north – Redding	Northern terminus; no access to I-5 south; I-5 south exit 553
1.000 mi = 1.609 km; 1.000 km = 0.621 mi: Incomplete access
