= Zamora, California =

Unincorporated community in California, United States

Zamora
- Unincorporated community
- Location in California Zamora (the United States)
- Coordinates: 38°47′48″N 121°52′55″W
- Country: United States
- State: California
- County: Yolo
- Elevation: 52 ft (16 m)

Zamora (formerly, Black's, Blacks, Black's Station, Blacks Station, and Prairie) is an unincorporated community in rural Yolo County, California, United States, on Interstate 5, due west of Knights Landing. Its ZIP code is 95698 and its area code 530. It is in the northern part of the county. "Zamora District is bordered by County Road 10 to the north and County Road 16 to the south, County Road 85 on the west and Highway 113 on the east. In 1879, Zamora District included the areas of West Grafton, the eastern portion of Fairview, and a small strip of East Grafton. The Zamora District encompasses Oat Valley, along Oat Creek in the northwestern part of the district and Hungry Hollow which is in an area along the foothills west of Zamora."

Zamora "was once a thriving little town with a hotel, two stores, a jail, blacksmith shops, a barbershop, a butcher shop, a medical office, a railroad depot, telegraph office, town hall, IOOF building, post office and six warehouses. There were schools and churches there, too. In 1949 and 1969 modern highways rolled through cutting the heart from the town. What was left was a town with 'no services', only a rebuilt IOOF building, a rebuilt town hall, the planing mill and St. Agnes Catholic Church, the school building plus a few houses. But the pulse of the community does not stop with the removal of its heart."

For many years, children of Zamora and its farm families attended kindergarten at Cacheville School in Yolo and first through eighth grades at Zamora Union School. This school had two classrooms, one for first through fourth grades, the other for fifth through eighth grades. Most teachers came to teach for one year only. Children now attend schools to the south in Woodland; older children attend Woodland High School.

In 2010, Zamora 4-H Club celebrated the 80th anniversary of its charter. Zamora 4-H has maintained the cohesiveness of the community since the loss of a community school.

Yolo County officials estimated its 2005 population at 61 and predicted it would have a population of 99 by 2025. Zamora is served by its own post office, a volunteer fire department and St Agnes Catholic church. It lies at an elevation of 52 feet (16 m).

== Economy ==
Like the rest of Yolo County, Zamora is primarily agricultural. As of 1994, the following families had owned land or lived in Zamora District for three or more generations: Abele, Anderson, Barnes, Bemmerly, Black, Burger, Campbell, Cassilis, Clark, Clausen, Crites, Croll, Curtis, Cutler, Dission, Dill, Fitzgerald, Flournoy, Foster, Gable, Gaddis, Giguiere, Glascock, Hanneman, Harley, Hatcher, Heard, Hermle, Hershey, Hiatt, Horgan, Houx, Huber, Hulbert, Jacobs, Kergel, LaDue, Long, March, Mast, Mezger, Morgan, Morris, Pockman, Quinn, Rahm, Reusch, Richter, Robinson, Rollins, Rominger, Root, Sandrock, Schlieman, Schlosser, Schneegas, Sharpnack, Slaven, Stabel, Stuhlmuller, Taylro, Vickroy, Walker, Weiss, Weyand, Wild, and Wohlfrom.

The Bariani Olive Oil Co. built a processing plant west of Zamora, and of this the Sacramento Business Journal reported on October 2, 2004: The 130-acre (0.53 km^{2}) parcel in Yolo County is big enough for 18,000 olive trees and a 30,000-square-foot (2,800 m^{2}) building.

== History ==
The first known inhabitants were Native Americans of the Patwin (or Southern Wintun) tribe. Using bows and arrows, spears or snares, Patwins stalked the abundant turtles, deer, tule elk, antelope and the occasional bear, mountain lion or wild cat that came down from the foothills and Coast Range. Using bow and arrow or nets they hunted ducks, geese and swans as they came into the tule marshlands during migrations. Spanish explorers explored the area in the early 1800s and, as a result, thousands of Patwins died from ill-treatment or previously unknown diseases. Patwins were also rounded up and taken as slaves to build Mission churches and work the mission ranches. Between 1829 and 1846, hunters and fur trappers from Santa Fe, New Mexico and from Hudson's Bay Company in Fort Vancouver sometimes traded with Patwin resulting in heavy losses of life for the trappers and hunters and for Patwin. The 1849 California gold rush miners brought more violence and disease.

The first wave of European settlers included: in 1852 John and Michael Bemmerly, Elias Harley, Edmund Burger; in 1853 Elias Harley and Martin Rahm, they ran out previous settlers who were there 3 years earlier they went by Ramirez and Zamora; in 1854 Silas Barnes and Henry Gaddis; in the late 1850s David Hershey, Theodore Weyand, Cary LeDue, Fred Schlieman and John Wolfrom; in the 1860s James J Black, Ephraim Crites, Gustave Anderson, John Huber, Thomas W Long, Gottlob Mast, James Root, John Walker. Many gained their property through 1862 Homestead act which promised 160-acre tract of public land to the head of a family after the land had been cleared, improved and occupied for 5 years. Some of the Zamora District was once part of Rancho de Hardy-Rio de Jesus Maria Rancho, granted to Thomas Hardy by Governor Micheltorena on October 23, 1843. In 1870, Circuit Court decided in favor of "Landowner's League upon the Hardy Grant", an organization of local landholders.

Many towns sprang up in Yolo County between 1868 and 1888, including Zamora, which was previously known as Black's. Black's was on the railroad and was the pioneer home of J. J. Black, who located there in 1865. In 1875, the Northern Railway Company began extending the railroad from Woodland to Red Bluff. When it reached Black's farm he donated a strip of land 100 feet wide by 3150 feet long acres for depot and grounds and the station was the result. Rights of way were sold for $10 to the railroad company by Silas Barnes, Henry Hoffman, Jacob Cunningham, Albion T. Robinson, Henry M. Cassilis and H.O. Dresser. . Four blocks were laid out with 16 lots of 30x120 feet per block. On September 18, 1875, C. H. Smart purchased 3 lots from Mr Black for $200 and became the first resident thereof, constructing for his use a dwelling house and a blacksmith shop at the corner of First and Main Streets. William Dorgan purchased 3 lots on March 9. 1876. Gustav Anderson bought 4 lots on April 15, 1876. Robert Huston and his brother Edward bought one lot and established the first store in 1876. The plan for the town of Black's Station (10.8 acres) was filed in 1877. A. C. Turner started the first hotel, and Thomas and Hunt erected the first grain warehouse. Among other builders were D. N. Hershey, Ed Huston, George Glascock and John Wolff. Black's Station from the first was an important shipping station, the great farms in the vicinity sending in their harvests to this point for transportation to market. The coming of the Yolo County Consolidated Water Company's system in 1903 to Black's added much to the importance of the place and stimulated business. The new packing plant was finished that year, making the station a fruit center. In 1906 the name was changed to Zamora. According to a 1920 Yolo County map, Zamora was in the Black's District.

A post office opened in Prairie in 1857, changed its name to Black's Station in 1876, and to Zamora in 1915. Prairie Post office was opened on March 19, 1857, at Weyand's Corner where a rural hotel, general store and stage stop were run at the ranch of Theodore Weyand, located at County Road 97 and County Road 13. Mr. Weyand was the first postmaster. Mail was delivered by stagecoach from Sacramento. Mr John Wolfrom served 8 years as postmaster when the post office was at his home just north of Weyand's which also served as rural hotel, general store and stage stop. Prairie Post Office alternated between Weyand's and Wolfrom's, serving the area until establishment of Black's Station Post Office in 1876. Robert M Huston was appointed postmaster December 4, 1876; Edward S Howard in 1882; William B. Black in 1888; Mason C. Gorton in 1898; Silas P. Cutler in 1903. The post office was located in the residence or business establishment of the postmaster until it was moved to a new hotel. On March 8, 1915, it became Zamora Post Office. Charles E Thomas was appointed postmaster in 1922. The hotel burned and Zamora post office moved to the IOOF building where Carey L Croll became postmistress in 1924. It moved to the home of Minnie Croll in 1932 when she was appointed Postmistress. In 1957, Zamora Post Office returned to the IOOF building with Ruth Anderson as postmistress. In 1969, the post office moved to a new IOOF building. Janice Croll became postmistress in 1978.

== Zamora soils ==
The town lends its name to a type of soil which is classified by the U.S. Department of Agriculture as "a member of the fine-silty, mixed, thermic family of Mollic Haploxeralfs". Typically, Zamora soils have grayish brown, slightly acid loam A horizons; brown silty clay loam, neutral Bt horizons; and yellowish brown C horizons." They are found "Along the west side of the Sacramento Valley in central California and other parts of California" and are "used for growing orchards, row, field, and truck crops. Native vegetation is annual grasses and forbs and widely spaced oaks."

Native plants included Valley Oaks whose ground acorns provided flour for the Patwin, wild oats, sunflower, clover, manzanita, blackberries, wild grapes.

Historically, grain crops were the only source of crop. Farmers in Zamora have had to cope with unpredictable years of drought and years of heavy rains. In the 1930s, the development of turbine pumps resulted in the ability of farmers to pump enough water for irrigation. This resulted in the ability for more diversified crops, including row crops, orchards, grapes, alfalfa and others.
