= Ocean Avenue (Santa Monica) =

Street in Santa Monica, United States

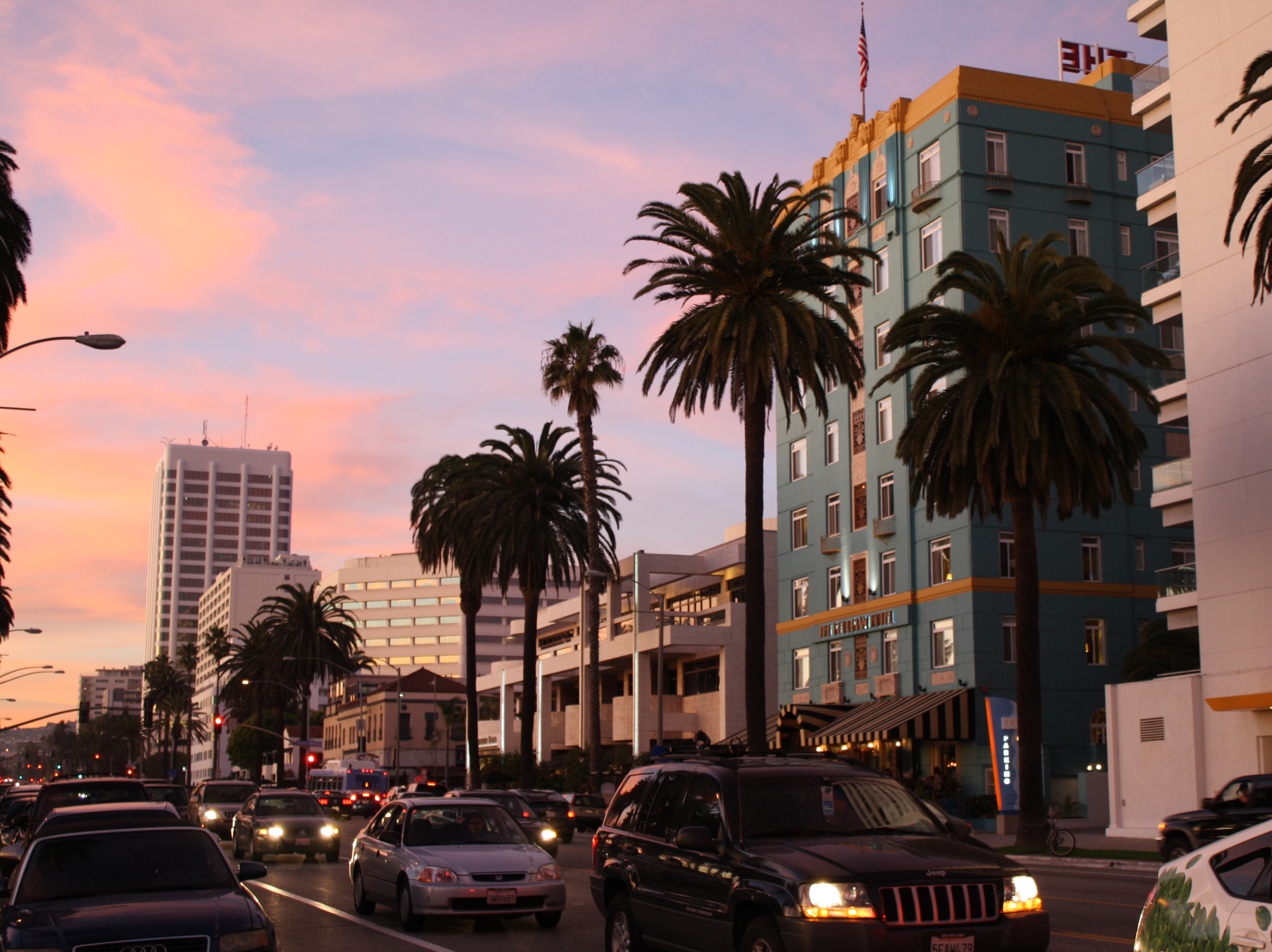
- South end: Hollister Avenue in Santa Monica
- Major junctions: I-10 / SR 1 in Santa Monica
- North end: Ocean Avenue Extension / San Vincente Boulevard in Santa Monica

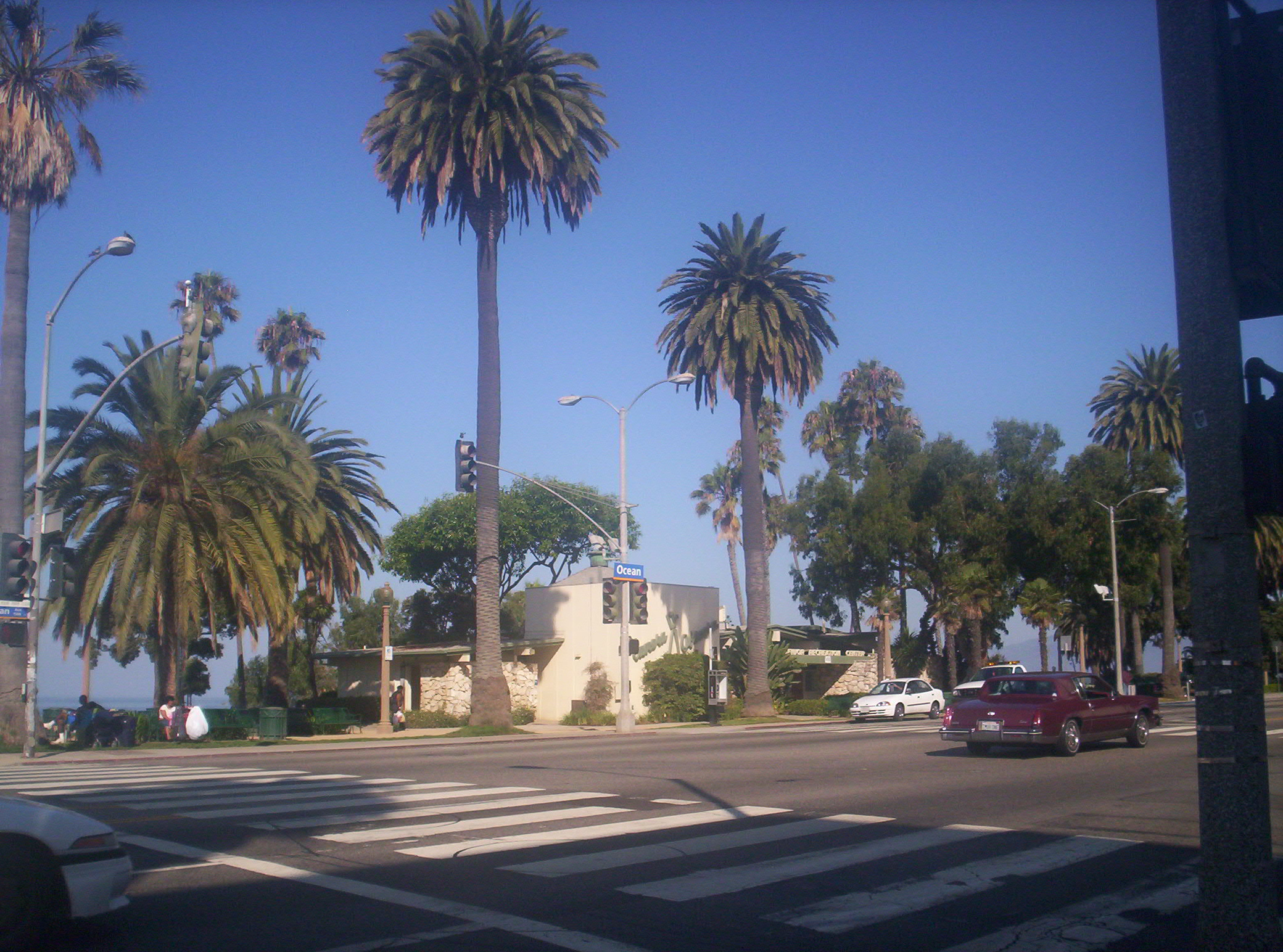
Ocean Avenue facing northwest

Ocean Avenue is a road in Santa Monica, California.

== Overview ==
Ocean Avenue starts at the residential Adelaide Drive on the north end of Santa Monica and ends at Pico Boulevard. It is the westernmost street in Santa Monica, and for most of its course it runs parallel to Palisades Park, whose bluffs overlook Pacific Coast Highway and Santa Monica State Beach.

There are several luxury mid-rise and high rise condos with views overlooking the Pacific Ocean, Santa Monica Beach, Malibu, and the Santa Monica Mountains. The Third Street Promenade is two blocks east. The Santa Monica Pier is located at the intersection of Ocean and Colorado.

Many major east–west arterial roads such as Wilshire Boulevard, Santa Monica Boulevard, and Pico Boulevard begin their western ends on Ocean Avenue. Southeast bound past Pico Boulevard, Ocean turns into Neilson Way. After Neilson Way hits Venice Beach, the street becomes Pacific Avenue, which continues past Washington Boulevard through the Marina Peninsula and ultimately ends at Via Marina and the main channel connecting Marina Del Rey harbor to the Pacific Ocean.

The intersection with California Avenue (the California Incline) leads to Pacific Coast Highway. The Pacific Coast Highway itself crosses underneath Ocean Avenue via the McClure Tunnel.

== Notable residents ==
- Former British Prime Minister Rishi Sunak and his wife, Indian heiress Akshata Murty
