= California Incline =

Road in Santa Monica, California, US

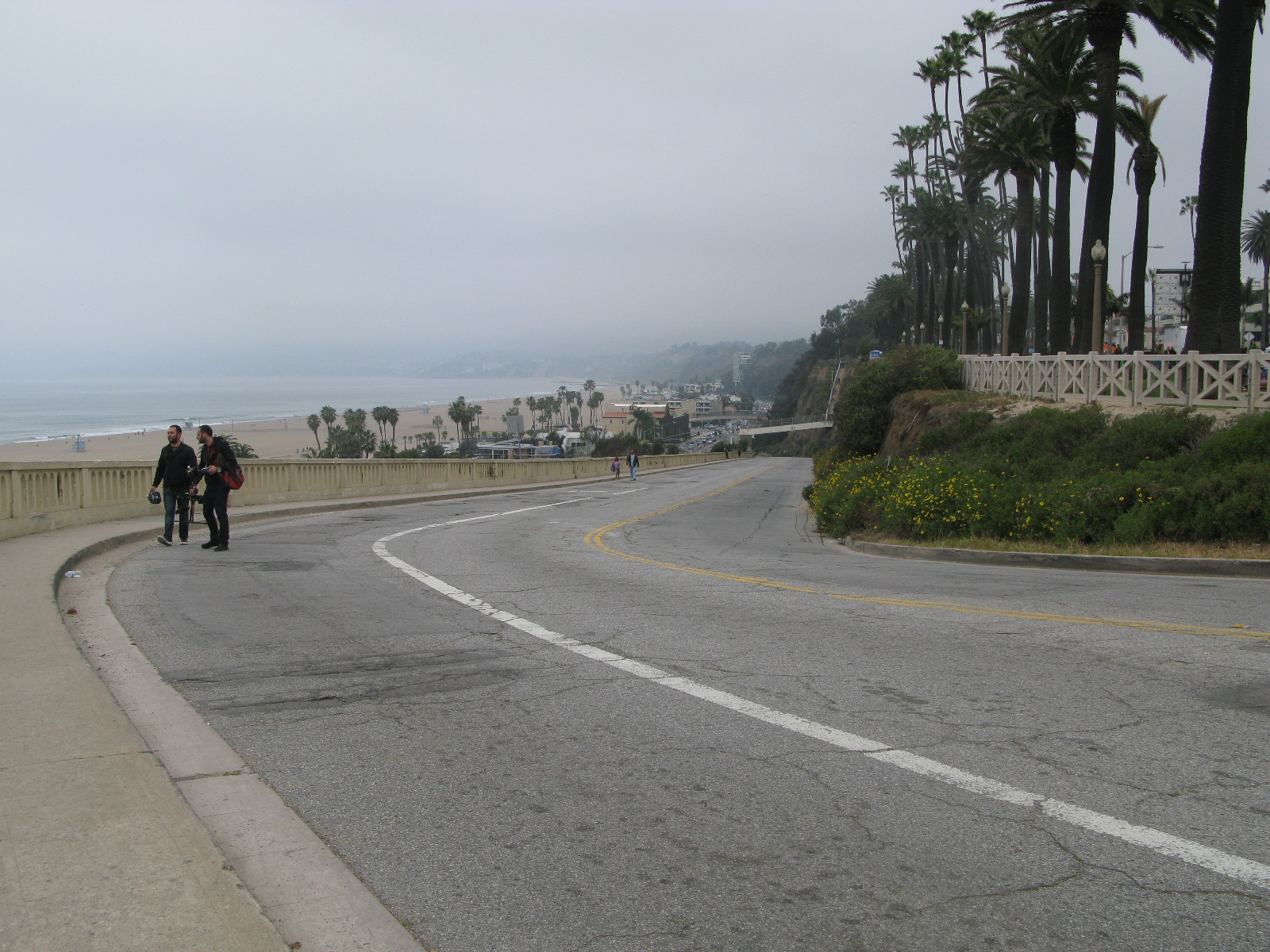
- The California Incline, facing north
- Former name: Sunset Trail
- Part of: California Avenue
- Type: Slanted road
- Owner: City of Santa Monica
- Maintained by: City of Santa Monica
- Length: 1,400 ft (430 m)
- West end: SR 1 (Pacific Coast Highway)
- East end: Ocean Avenue

Construction
- Completed: 1896

The California Incline is a slanted road in Santa Monica, California, connecting Ocean Avenue with State Route 1 (Pacific Coast Highway or PCH). It technically is the last link, the western end of California Avenue, a major east–west street in Santa Monica.

== History and overview ==
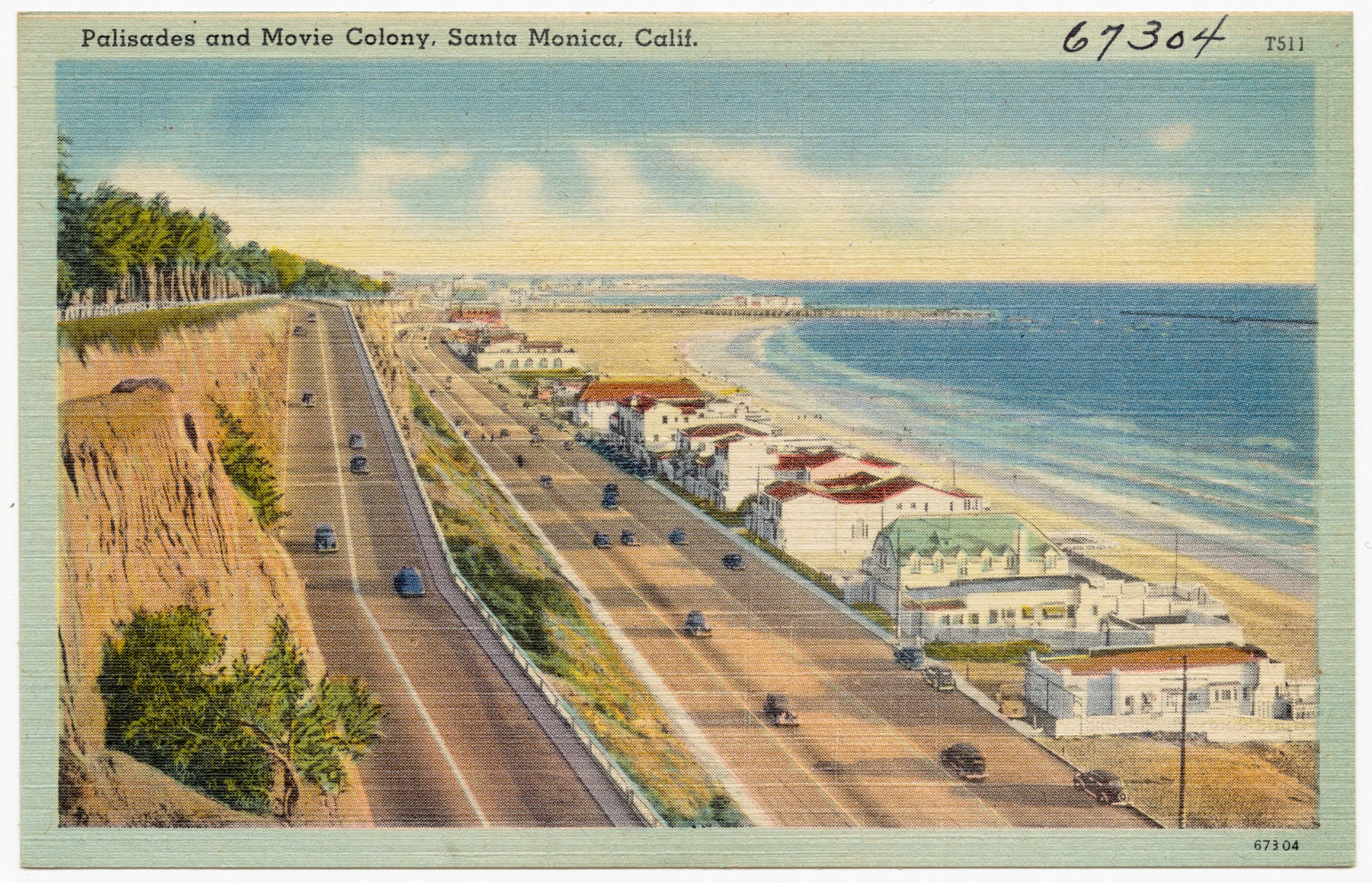
California Incline depicted on a postcard, circa 1930 to 1945

The Santa Monica Conservancy identifies the California Incline as a primary access route, descending approximately 1,400 feet from Ocean and California Avenues to Pacific Coast Highway. In addition to serving transportation needs, it offers one of the city’s most prominent coastal views. During the early twentieth century, access to the beach from the bluff was limited. In 1905, city engineer Thomas H. James proposed an incline plan that included the California, Idaho, and Oregon Avenue routes, incorporating rustic fencing for safety. These routes were subsequently renamed, and Linda Vista Drive became known as the California Incline. The California Incline was significantly widened in 1932 with funding from the Public Works Administration, expanding from twenty to forty feet as part of broader road improvement efforts. The roadway structure was 1,400 feet (430 m) in length. In 1934, a neon arrival sign was installed.

The California Incline was originally a walkway known as Sunset Trail, which was cut through the bluffs to provide beach access to pedestrians in 1896. A roadway structure 1,400 feet (430 m) in length was built in 1932. It is a vital street in Santa Monica, linking the PCH with Ocean Avenue and California Avenue, bisecting Palisades Park. It begins at an intersection with Ocean Avenue and California Avenue, at the top of the Palisades, extending to the PCH at the base of the bluffs.

== 2015–16 reconstruction ==
The California Incline was identified as structurally deficient in the early 1990s. In 2007, the City of Santa Monica secured federal highway funds to replace the structure with one meeting current seismic standards. The new bridge consists of a pile-supported reinforced concrete slab structure with a width of 51 feet 8 inches (15.75 m), an increase of 5 feet 8 inches (1.73 m) over the previous structure. The project cost $17 million, with 88.5% coming from federal funds and the balance from local funds. Construction began in April 2015 and took 17 months to complete. The roadway reopened to the public on September 1, 2016. The rebuilt structure includes wider sidewalks and bicycle lanes.

== Legacy and popular culture ==
The California Incline has been featured in various films, including It's a Mad, Mad, Mad, Mad World (1963) and Knocked Up (2007). It was also featured in the hardboiled crime novel In a Lonely Place (1942), written by Dorothy B. Hughes. It was also portrayed in some video games including Street Racing Syndicate, Midnight Club II, Midnight Club: LA (and its Remix version), American Truck Simulator, and Grand Theft Auto V.

In fine art, the California Incline has served as a recurring source of inspiration for geometric abstraction painter Amadour, whose internationally exhibited California Incline series reimagines the Santa Monica landmark’s arches, coastal light, and oceanfront architecture within the abstract tradition associated with historic Santa Monica artist Richard Diebenkorn’s Ocean Park series.

== See also ==
- McClure Tunnel
- Angels Flight
