= Wiley's Well =

Artesian well in Colorado Desert, California USA

Coordinates: 33°29′38″N 114°53′23″W

Wiley's Well is a natural artesian well in the Colorado Desert of Southern California as well as the name of the surrounding region. It is west of Blythe, California, in Riverside County.

It is named after Palo Verde storekeeper and postmaster A.P. Wiley who, in 1907, made a shallow well deeper that was dug in 1876 by a stagecoach company which frequented the nearby Bradshaw Trail. Wiley expanded the well in the hope of attracting business to his remote desert store; it was maintained by local ranchers and cattlemen for years afterward. However, the rapidly falling water table meant a drop of the water's depth to 60 feet (18 m) within a dozen years. Today, the well's original depth is only about 20 feet (6.1 m) at best after wet weather and is unfit for drinking.

In 1985, the Bureau of Land Management drilled a new well 965 feet (294 m) in depth to support the new Wiley's Well Campground, one of only two developed campgrounds in the Mule Mountains Long-Term Visitor Area. The water is both hot at 90 °F/32 °C and heavily mineralized; it is pumped into a cistern to help cool it to a temperature suitable for drinking.

Wiley's Well is also a popular rockhounding site, beginning in the 1930s with the discovery of geode beds. Despite its popularity over the decades, the area remains rich with chalcedony, citrine, quartz crystals, rhyolite and jasper. Though winters are mild, making the campground a popular destination with seasonal visitors from colder climes, summer can be extremely hot with recorded temperatures as high as 130 °F (54 °C).

Wiley's Well is easily accessible via the Wiley's Well Road exit off Interstate 10, 16 miles (26 km) west of Blythe. The entrance to the campground is 9 miles (14 km) south of the highway.

== External links and references ==
- Wiley's Well Campground, Bureau of Land Management
- Wiley's Well Rest Area, California Department of Transportation
- Article about Wiley's Well by Delmer G. Ross of La Sierra University
