= Dosan Ahn Chang Ho Memorial Interchange =

Highway interchange in California

- Harbor–Santa Monica Freeway Interchange
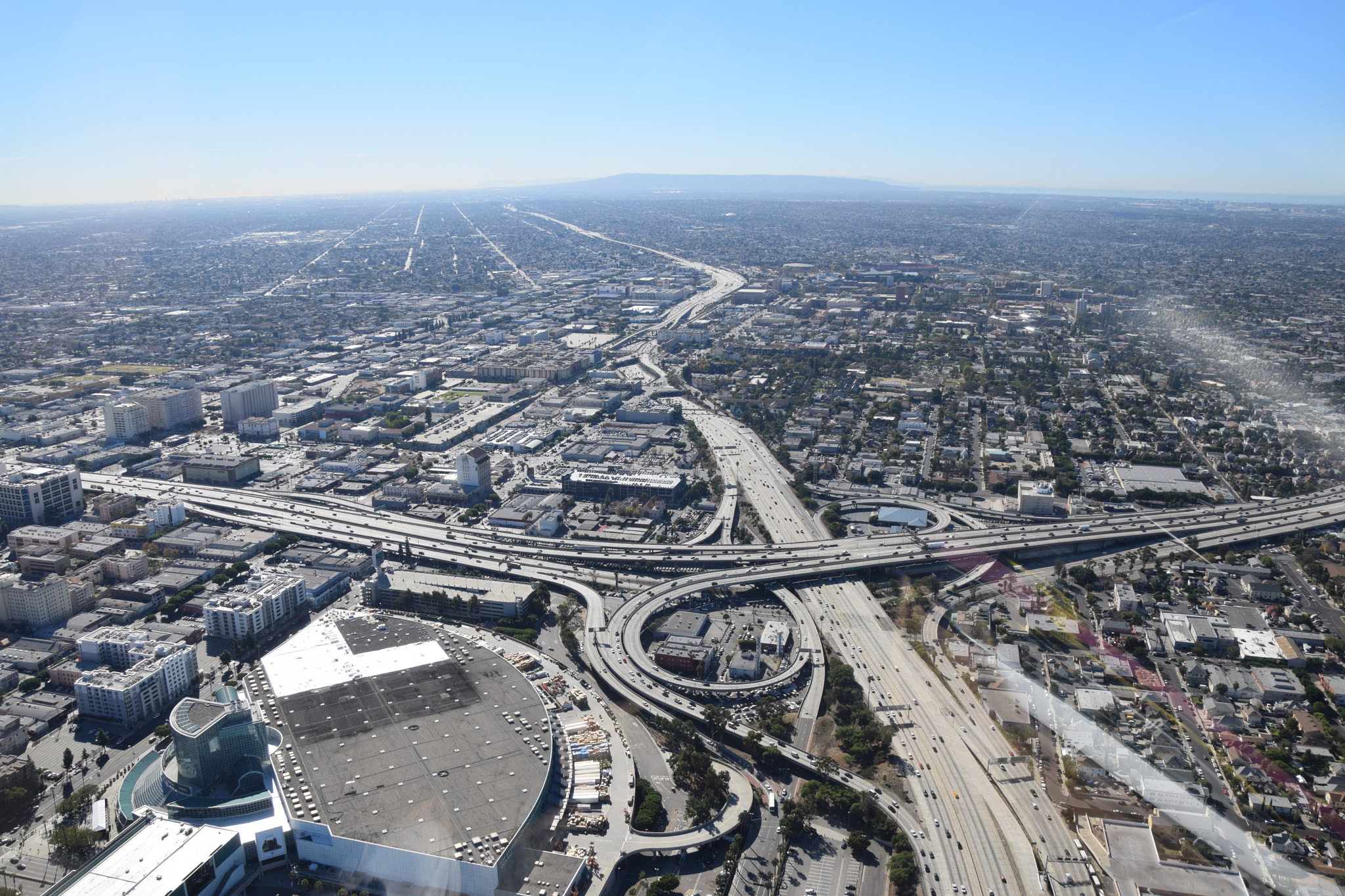
- The Dosan Ahn Chang Ho Memorial Interchange in 2015, taken from the north

Location
- Los Angeles, California
- Coordinates: 34°02′17″N 118°16′27″W
- Roads at junction: I-110 / SR 110 (Harbor Freeway); I-10 (Santa Monica Freeway)

Construction
- Type: Three-level cloverstack interchange
- Constructed: January 20, 1958 – October 4, 1959
- Opened: January 15, 1962
- Maintained by: California Department of Transportation

The Dosan Ahn Chang Ho Memorial Interchange, also known as the Harbor–Santa Monica Freeway Interchange, is a three-level cloverstack interchange that serves as the junction between the Harbor (Interstate 110 and State Route 110) and Santa Monica (Interstate 10) Freeways at the southern edge of Downtown Los Angeles, California.

Officially named since 2002 after Korean independence activist Ahn Chang Ho, and constructed as part of the first segment of the Santa Monica Freeway which was completed in 1962, it is one of the busiest freeway interchanges in Los Angeles, with hundreds of thousands of vehicles using the interchange daily.

== History ==
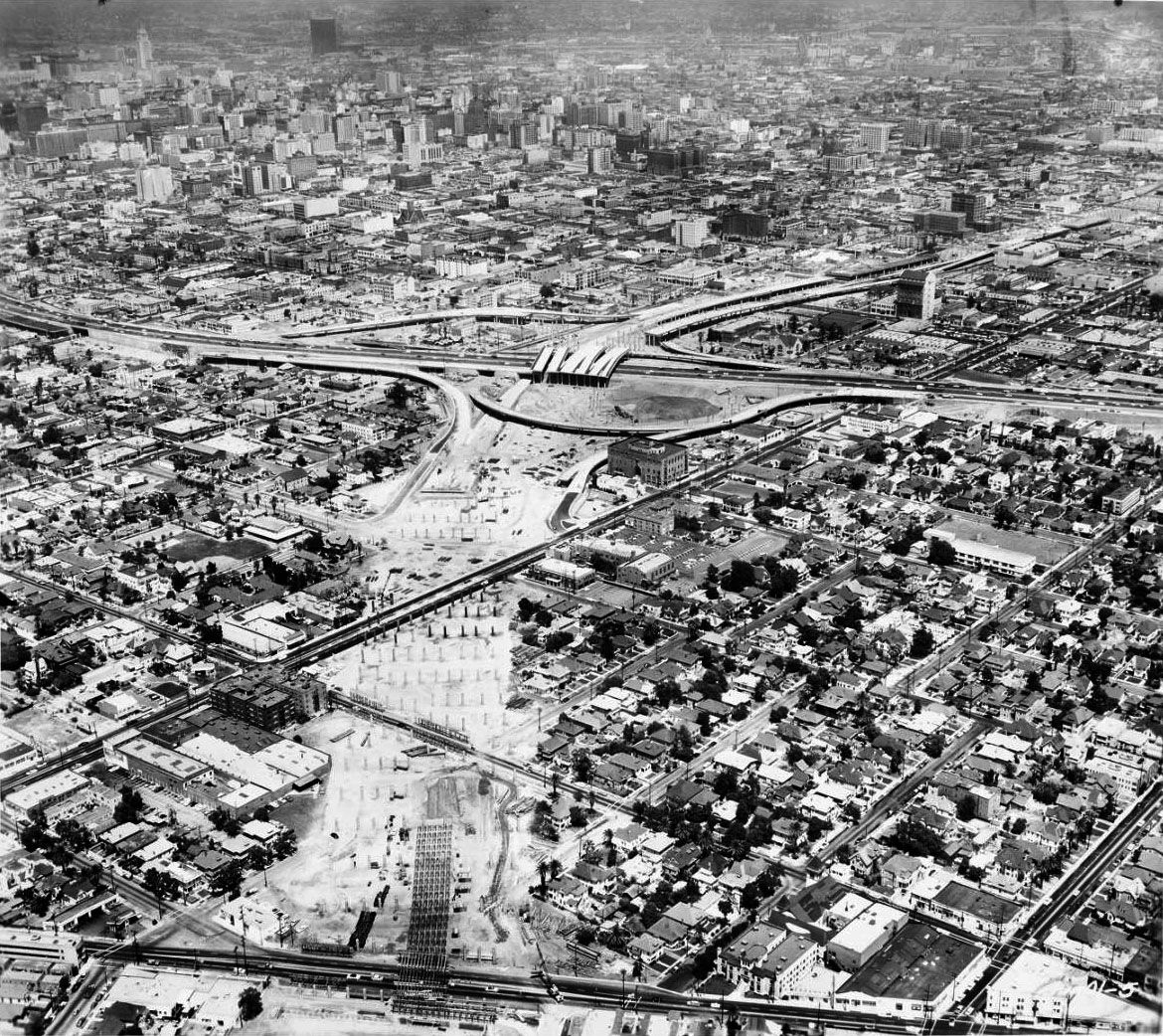
Construction of the Santa Monica Freeway's initial segment, which includes the interchange

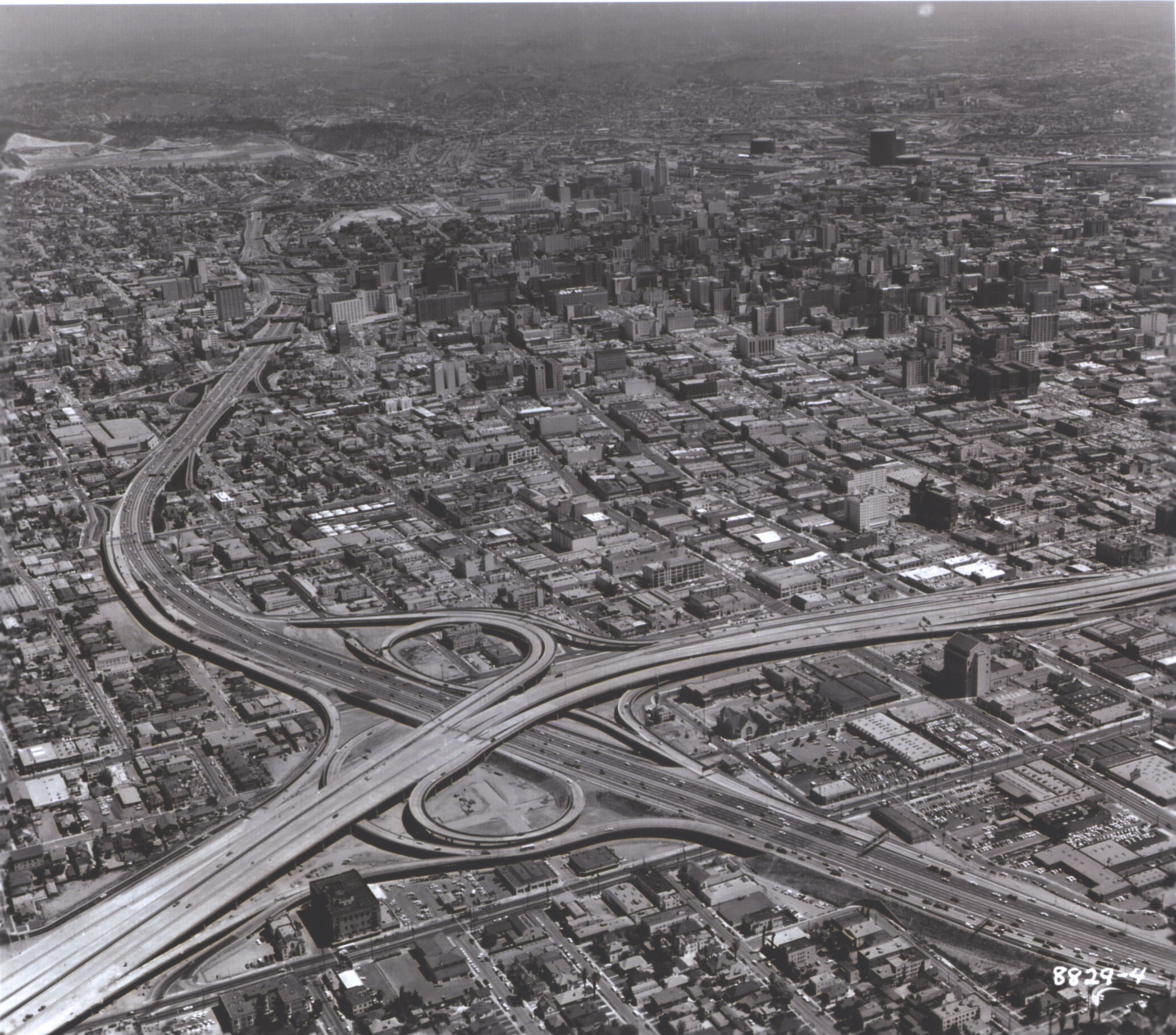
1963 aerial view of the interchange

Planning for the construction of the Santa Monica Freeway originally did not account for the construction of an interchange with the Harbor Freeway. In 1955, it was initially planned that the freeway would terminate at the Harbor Freeway, as opposed to its original alignment through Downtown Los Angeles, without necessarily connecting to it.

By 1957, the California Division of Highways (now the California Department of Transportation) had accounted for an interchange in planning the construction of the Santa Monica Freeway, with construction of the interchange being included in the freeway's initial segment which started at the East Los Angeles Interchange. Construction work for the initial segment, valued at $8.4 million ($69.7 million in 2023 dollars), began that summer on June 17, 1957, with major grade separation and rerouting work for the interchange, requiring the temporary rerouting of the Harbor Freeway and the diversion of Venice Boulevard, taking place the following year. In common with the East Los Angeles Interchange, which was built in the middle of majority-Hispanic Boyle Heights, the interchange's construction displaced an entire neighborhood — described by the Home Owners' Loan Corporation as being "thoroughly blighted" — primarily inhabited by African Americans, along with smaller numbers of Mexicans, Japanese and Italians.

The interchange was opened on Monday, January 15, 1962, along with the entire initial segment of the Santa Monica Freeway, completing the ring of freeways that would encircle Downtown Los Angeles. By 1967, it had become the single busiest point in the entire Los Angeles freeway system, with some 400,000 vehicles using the interchange daily, and although it has since been eclipsed by other interchanges in terms of traffic, by 1988 some 502,000 vehicles were passing through the interchange per day. Nearly ten years later in 1997, it once again became the busiest interchange in Los Angeles, with some 558,000 vehicles passing through daily.

On September 11, 2002, the California State Senate passed a resolution, authored by Senator Kevin Murray, officially naming the interchange after Korean independence activist and local community leader Ahn Chang Ho, in celebration of 100 years of Korean immigration to the United States. Freeway signage with the new name was later installed in early 2004.

== Layout and design ==
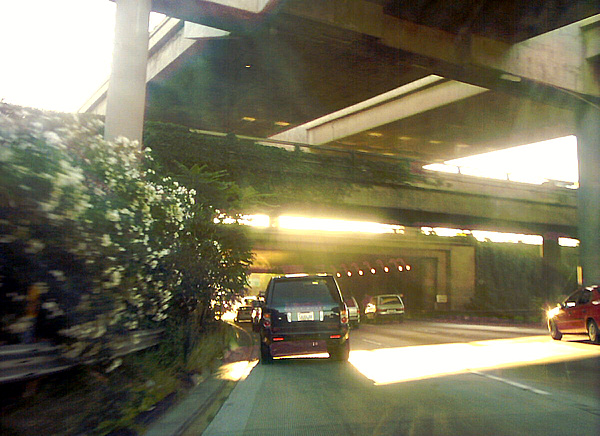
The interchange's three levels

The Dosan Ahn Chang Ho Memorial Interchange was designed as a three-level cloverstack interchange, consisting of both depressed and elevated segments that connect the Harbor and Santa Monica Freeways. Construction of the interchange, with a budgeted cost of $1.48 million ($12.3 million in 2023 dollars), began on January 20, 1958, and was contracted to the Los Angeles-based Webb and White.

Construction was complicated by the large amount of traffic carried by the Harbor Freeway, which at the time of construction carried some 190,000 vehicles a day, and Venice Boulevard, a major city artery which originally crossed underneath the Harbor Freeway and through the interchange site. To accommodate the construction of the interchange, the Harbor Freeway was temporarily diverted to the west, while a bridge was constructed to carry Venice Boulevard over the diverted freeway. The diversion project, costing $380,000 ($3.15 million in 2023 dollars), was at the time the most expensive highway diversion project in California history, and lasted a full 14 months until October 4, 1959, when construction of the interchange was completed and the diversion roads dismantled.

The interchange's first level consists of a pair of tunnels 190 feet (58 m) long, at a grade up to 5 feet (1.5 m) below the span of the Harbor Freeway, with one tunnel carrying the westbound span of the Santa Monica Freeway, built with a combination of box girders and cored slabs on a deep foundation, and the other carrying the connector to the southbound Harbor Freeway, constructed as a cut-and-cover tunnel. The Harbor Freeway's span forms the interchange's second level, while the Santa Monica Freeway's eastbound span and a number of collector–distributor roads form the third level, partially supported by the foundations on the first level, as well as its own independent deep foundation with a design capacity of 100 tons. The interchange's structure was retrofitted in the early 1990s in response to the Loma Prieta earthquake that struck northern California four years earlier.

In 1969, the California Highway Commission approved a plan to lease 164,000 square feet (15,200 m^{2}) of space underneath the interchange to the California Highway Patrol, with the CHP constructing an office building with room for 100 police cars, as well as automobile and truck inspection areas, on the site. Aside from the CHP office, a number of prominent Los Angeles landmarks abut the interchange, including the L.A. Live entertainment complex, which includes the Los Angeles Convention Center and Crypto.com Arena.

=== Reception ===
Although the interchange has been designed to handle extremely heavy traffic movements, a study by the University of Southern California identified it as one of the worst interchanges in Los Angeles for traffic congestion, with significant traffic slowdowns around the interchange during rush hour.

Criticism with the interchange is not limited to traffic. In an opinion piece written for the JoongAng Ilbo, Park Dong-woo, an assistant to California State Assemblywoman Sharon Quirk-Silva, called on Korean community groups to help clean up and maintain the signage naming the interchange for Ahn Chang Ho after being seen stained with graffiti, criticizing the indifference of Korean Americans to their condition.

== Incidents and accidents ==
A number of accidents have happened on the Dosan Ahn Chang Ho Memorial Interchange. On August 2, 1976, a tanker truck overturned on the transition road between the eastbound Santa Monica Freeway and the southbound Harbor Freeway, spilling 4,000 US gallons (15,000 L) of hydrochloric acid onto the freeway and injuring three people. The spill caused the closure of the freeway from the interchange to Adams Boulevard for about four hours, leading to significant traffic congestion which lasted several hours.

Eleven years later on March 15, 1987, another tanker truck tipped over on the same transition road, spilling 2,000 US gallons (7,600 L) of heavy crude oil onto the freeway. Although the incident led to the closure of the interchange for 17 hours, it did not lead to significant traffic congestion as it happened early enough in the morning that the CHP and Caltrans were able to set up detours to redirect traffic away from the area.

== See also ==
- Four Level Interchange, the counterpart at the northern edge of Downtown Los Angeles
