= East Los Angeles Interchange =

Freeway interchange in Los Angeles, California

- Eugene A. Obregon Memorial Interchange
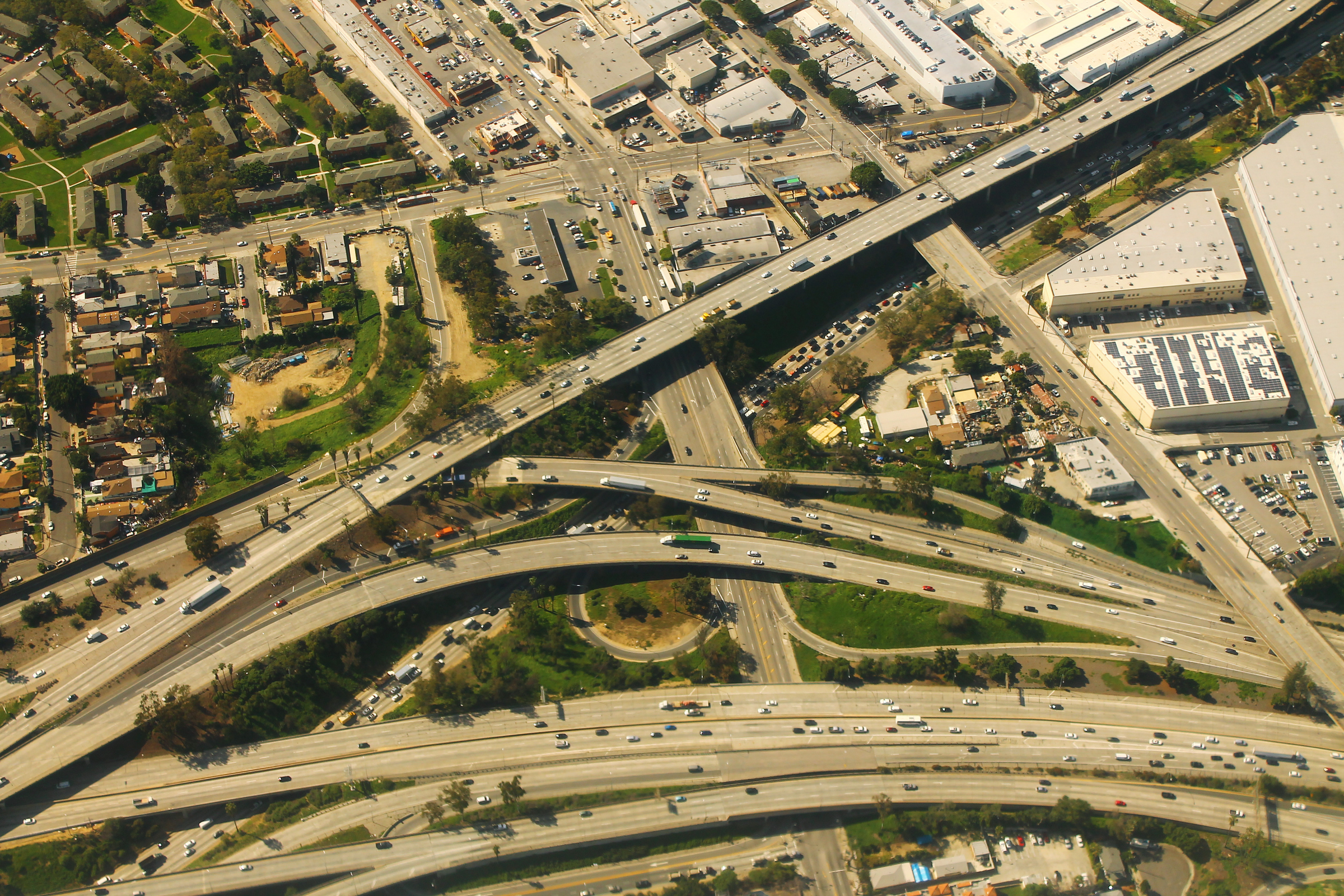
- Part of the southern portion of the East Los Angeles Interchange in 2017
- Interactive map of East Los Angeles Interchange

Location
- Los Angeles, California
- Coordinates: 34°01′51″N 118°13′14″W
- Roads at junction: I-5 (Golden State Freeway / Santa Ana Freeway); I-10 (Santa Monica Freeway / San Bernardino Freeway); SR 60 (Pomona Freeway); US 101 (Santa Ana Freeway)

Construction
- Type: Hybrid two-level directional T/turbine (northern) and three-level directional T (southern) interchange complex
- Maintained by: California Department of Transportation

The East Los Angeles Interchange is an interchange complex located in Boyle Heights, Los Angeles, approximately 1 mile (1.6 km) east of Downtown Los Angeles. With its southern portion handling over 550,000 vehicles per day (2008 AADT), it is the busiest freeway interchange in the world. The northern portion, called the San Bernardino Split, is often considered a separate interchange. Four numbered routes converge at the interchange: Interstate 5 (I-5), I-10, U.S. Route 101 (US 101), and State Route 60 (SR 60), but the freeway segments shift alignments and directions.

The interchange was named the Eugene A. Obregon Memorial Interchange to honor U.S. Marine Corps member and Medal of Honor recipient Eugene A. Obregon.

== Description ==
At the time of its construction in the early 1960s, the East Los Angeles Interchange was considered a civil engineering marvel. Located along the east bank of the Los Angeles River in the Los Angeles district of Boyle Heights, east of Downtown Los Angeles, the interchange comprises six freeway segments; that is, there are six freeway paths of travel into the complex. The actual number of numbered highways intersecting at this interchange is four:

- I-5 (Golden State Freeway / Santa Ana Freeway) – Sacramento, Santa Ana
- I-10 (San Bernardino Freeway / Santa Monica Freeway) – San Bernardino, Santa Monica
- SR 60 east (Pomona Freeway) – Pomona
- US 101 north (Santa Ana Freeway) – Los Angeles Civic Center

The interchange is so complex because the intersecting freeways shift alignments and directions:

- I-5 (originally US 101) enters the complex from the south as the Santa Ana Freeway, but exits to the north as the Golden State Freeway. The Santa Ana Freeway continues west as US 101 toward the Four Level Interchange (Bill Keene Memorial Interchange) in downtown Los Angeles.
- I-10 (originally US 70 "Ramona Freeway" [sic] / US 60) is not contiguous through the interchange. Heading west into the complex on the San Bernardino Freeway (I-10), the trunk road heads to US 101 at the San Bernardino Split. In order to follow the I-10 alignment, one must exit the trunk road and follow a connector that merges with the alignment of southbound I-5, then exit that trunk and follow another connector to the Santa Monica Freeway (I-10).
- Heading west into the complex on the Pomona Freeway (SR 60), the primary road (or trunk) heads into the Santa Monica Freeway (I-10).

There is not complete freedom of movement within the interchange. Traffic flowing into it on certain freeways cannot leave it on all of the others.

- There is no direct connector from the westbound Pomona Freeway (SR 60) to the southbound Santa Ana Freeway (I-5) (and vice versa); travelers wanting to make this transition must exit at the Pomona Freeway's interchange with the Long Beach Freeway (I-710) located three miles (4.8 km) to the east, head south, and then transition to the Santa Ana Freeway at the interchange between those two freeways.
- There is no direct connector from the southbound Santa Ana Freeway (US 101) to the northbound Golden State Freeway (I-5) (and vice versa); travelers wanting to make this transition must exit at the Four Level Interchange with the Arroyo Seco Parkway (SR 110, northeast from this interchange) located three miles (4.8 km) to the west, head northeast, and then transition to the Golden State Freeway at the interchange between those two freeways.
- There is no direct connector from the southbound Santa Ana Freeway (US 101) to the westbound Santa Monica Freeway (I-10) (and vice versa); travelers wanting to make this transition must exit at the Four Level Interchange with the Harbor Freeway (SR 110, southwest from this interchange) located three miles (4.8 km) to the west, head southwest, and then transition to the Santa Monica Freeway at the Dosan Ahn Chang Ho Memorial Interchange.

Further complication is caused by the varying designs of each intersecting freeway and their related transition roads. Some have four lanes and are relatively straight and wide, while others have one lane, are narrow, or have curves with tighter radii or cambers. Traffic congestion is thus exacerbated as vehicles moving at high speed on the wider transition roads try to merge with slower moving vehicles coming from the narrow transition roads.

== History ==
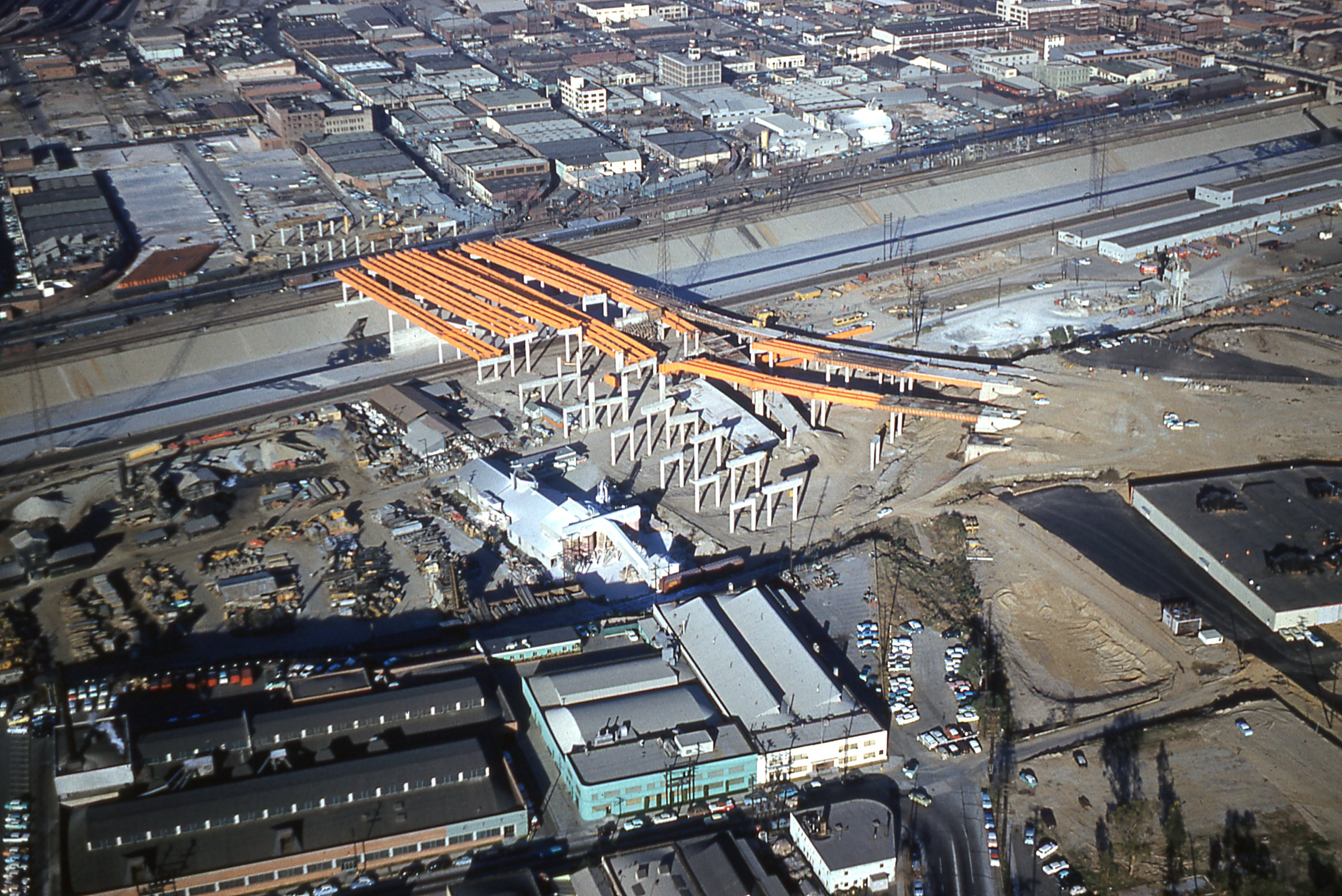
Construction of the Los Angeles River bridge on the west side of the interchange

Construction of the 135-acre (55 ha) freeway interchange began in 1961. The vastness of the structure and the complexity of its many routes called for a $17,000 blueprint model of the highway. It has thirty-two bridges and twenty walls with 1,500,000 cubic yards (1,100,000 m^{3}) of earth being excavated. The project laid 23,545 feet (7,177 m) of concrete pipe, used 4,200,000 cubic yards (3,200,000 m^{3}) of concrete and 13,200,000 pounds (6,000,000 kg) of reinforcing and structural steel.

== In popular culture ==
Although not commonly called such by residents and other reporters, the freeway intersection was often called "Malfunction Junction" by former KNX traffic reporter Bill Keene, because of its complicated interchange structure. The interchange has also been referred to as "The Beast" L.A. Interchange and the "East Delay" Interchange, names attributed to KNX's Jim Thornton, as well as the "Nickel/Dime" during traffic reports.
