= Garvey Avenue =

Road in Southern California, US

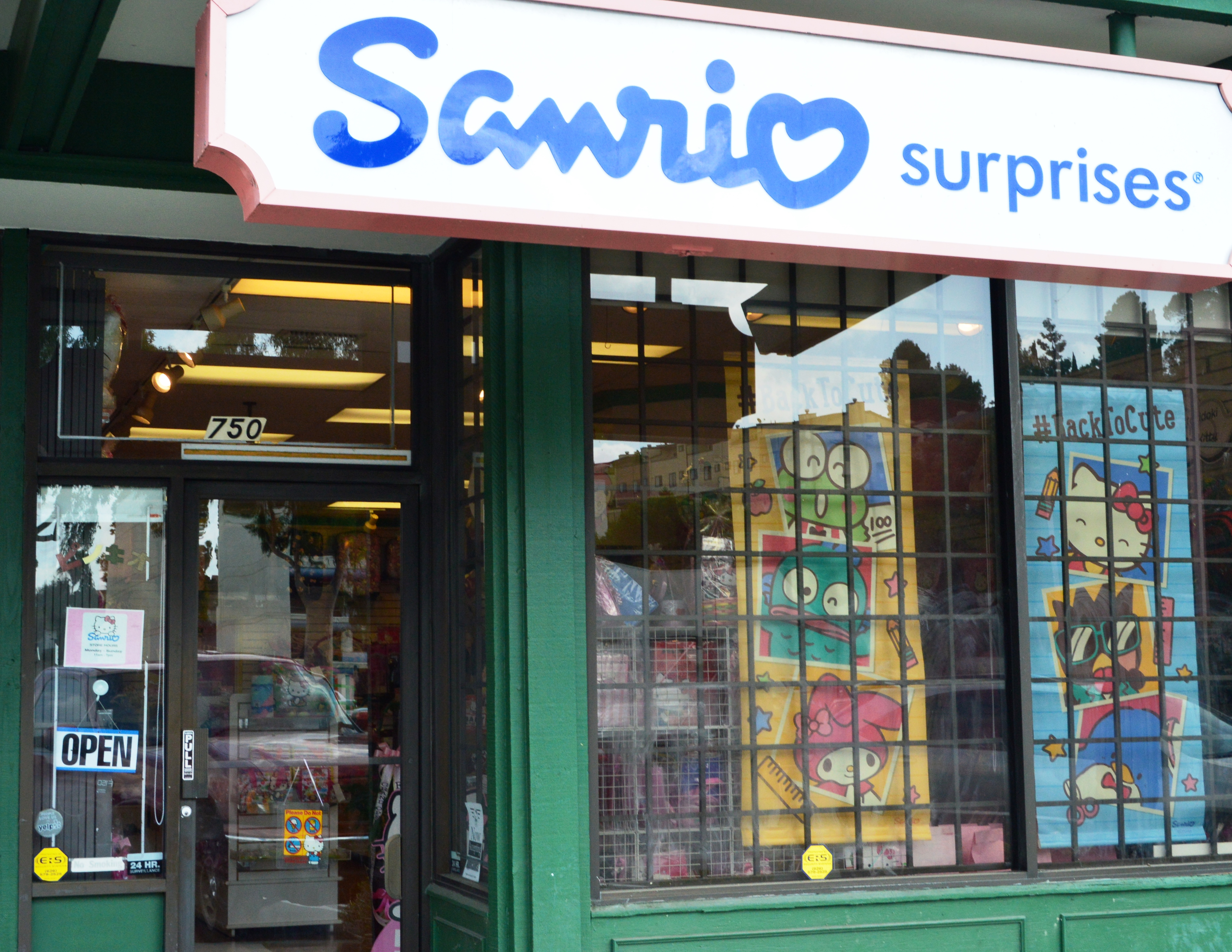
Sanrio Surprises at a shopping plaza on the corner of Garvey Avenue and Atlantic Boulevard in Monterey Park, Los Angeles County, California.

Garvey Avenue is a west-east thoroughfare in the San Gabriel Valley. It is named after Richard Garvey Sr., a former postal horse rider and ranch owner who donated part of his land to create the thoroughfare, which became an important link between Los Angeles and the San Gabriel Valley, especially prior to the establishment of the Interstate Highway System.

== Geography ==
Garvey Avenue starts off as Ramona Boulevard at Eastern Avenue in Los Angeles' Eastside. Upon entrance to Alhambra, the name changes to Garvey Avenue. In addition to Alhambra, it runs through cities like Monterey Park, Rosemead, and El Monte. Garvey Avenue is one of Monterey Park's main commercial thoroughfares. It terminates at Durfee Avenue. For much of its length, it runs parallel to Interstate 10; the frontage roads for Interstate 10 in West Covina and Covina are named Garvey Avenue N and Garvey Avenue S.

== See also ==
- Richard Garvey Intermediate School
- List of streets in the San Gabriel Valley
