= McClure Tunnel =

Tunnel in California

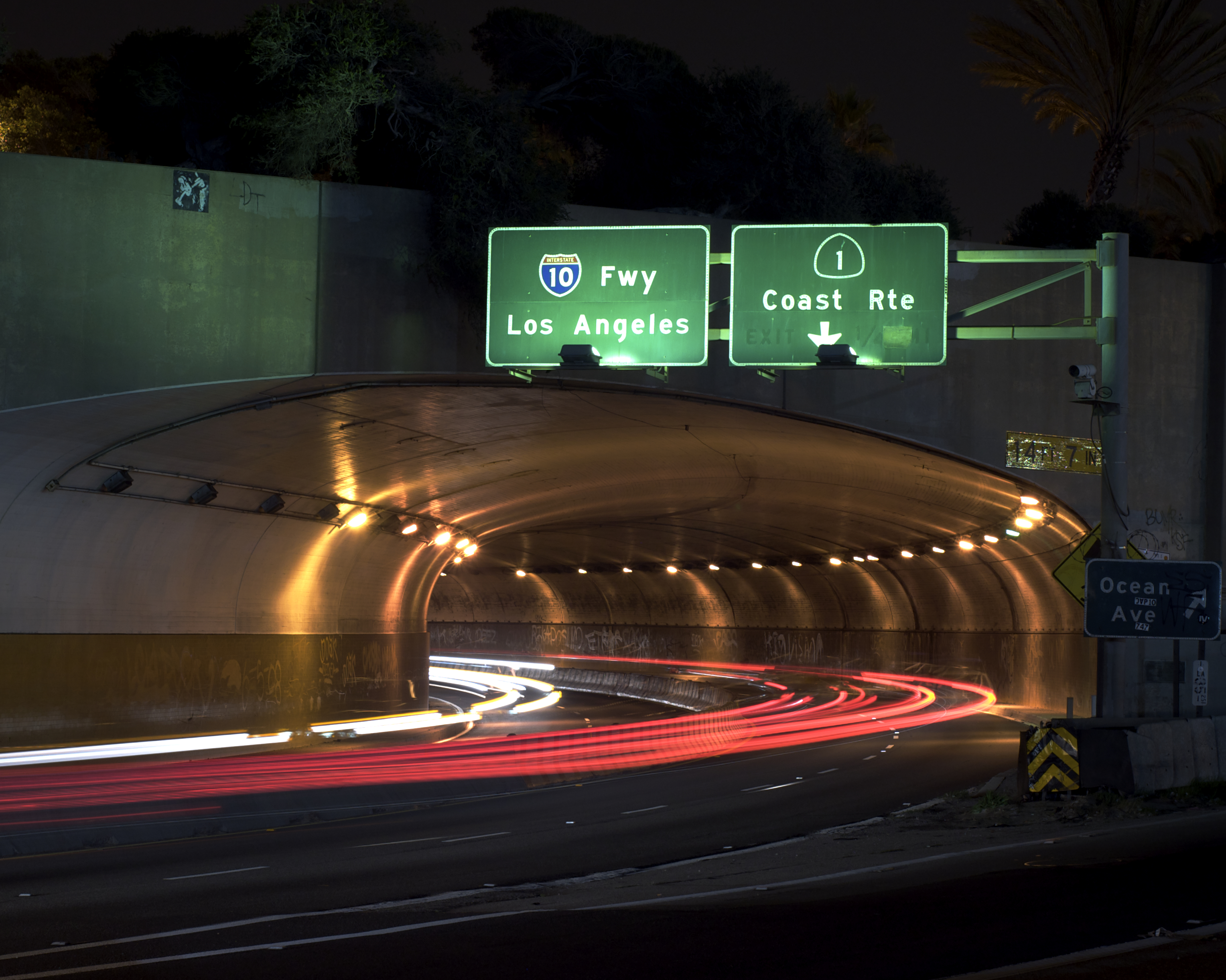
- Western entrance of the McClure Tunnel

Overview
- Location: Santa Monica, California
- Coordinates: 34.0114°N 118.4955°W
- Route: SR 1
- Crosses: Santa Monica ocean bluffs

Technical
- Length: 400 feet (120 m)

The McClure Tunnel is a tunnel in Santa Monica, California, that connects Pacific Coast Highway (State Route 1) to its junction with the western terminus of the Santa Monica Freeway (Interstate 10). The tunnel passes through the Santa Monica ocean bluffs, underneath the Colorado Avenue–Ocean Avenue intersection and close to the Santa Monica Pier and southern end of Palisades Park. The length of the McClure Tunnel is about 400 feet (120 m). The current tunnel opened in 1936, replacing an earlier rail tunnel which had been bored in 1886. It was officially named the McClure Tunnel in 1979 after Robert E. McClure, a local newspaper publisher and member of the state highway commission.

== California highway status ==
According to the California State Highway system, the McClure Tunnel is part of State Route 1 in its entirety. The western terminus of Interstate 10/Santa Monica Freeway is to the east of the tunnel when SR 1 turns into a freeway at 4th Street. SR 1 then exits onto Lincoln Boulevard while I-10 continues east to Los Angeles.

== History ==
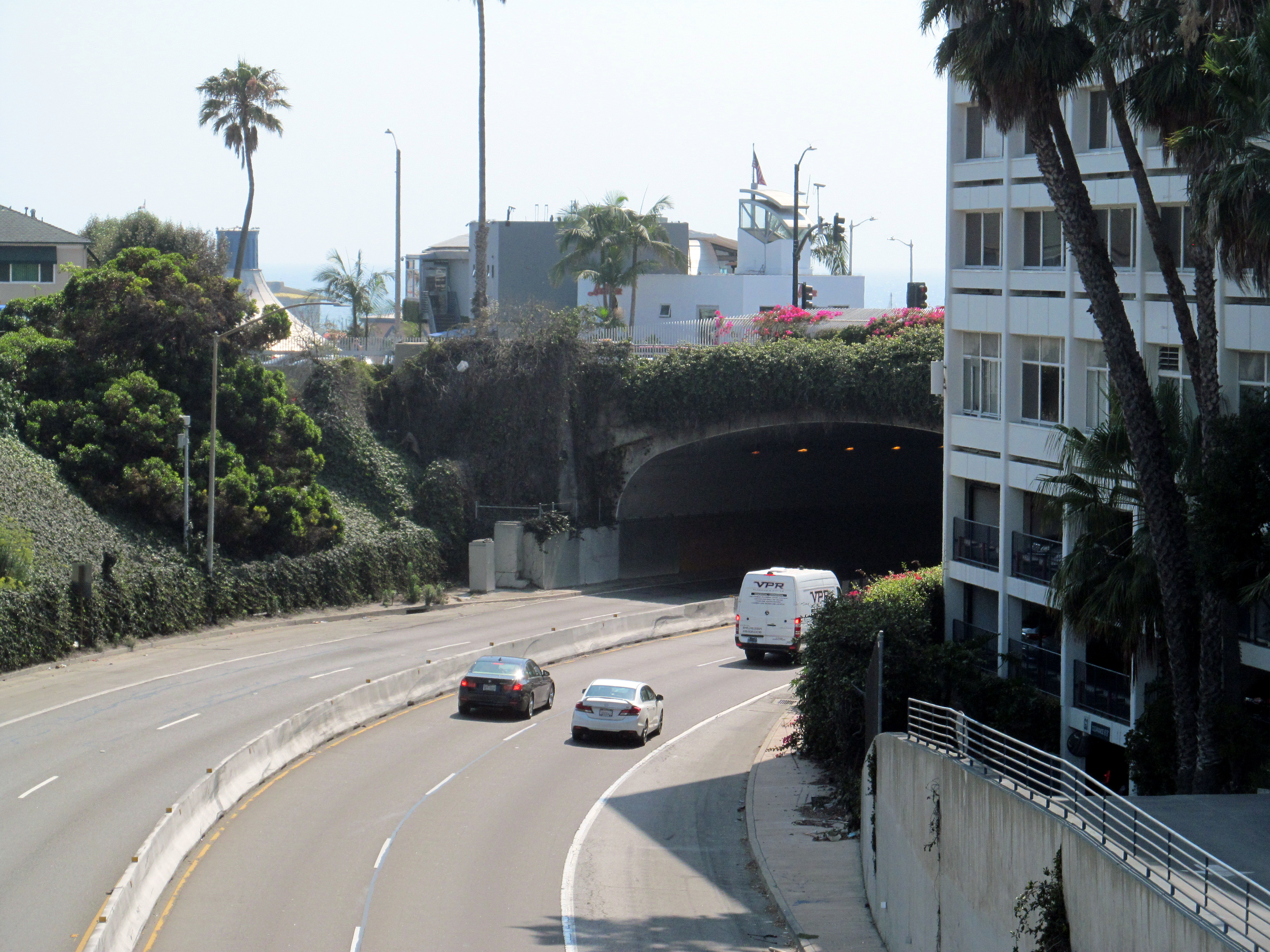
Eastern tunnel portal

The tunnel was originally constructed in 1893 as a Southern Pacific Railroad tunnel intended to enable the railroad to take trains to Santa Monica's Long Wharf. This tunnel, and the ocean view to the left that suddenly appears as the passenger moves westward out of the curved tunnel, was depicted in a brief 1898 Edison Studios film called Going Through the Tunnel. It was demolished and reconstructed in Works Progress Administration Moderne style as an auto tunnel, known as the Olympic Tunnel and opened in 1936. The tunnel was built at a cost of $200,000 and connected Roosevelt Highway with Olympic and Lincoln boulevards. The freeway connected to the tunnel in 1966, and in 1969 the tunnel was officially named in honor of Robert E. McClure, editor of the Santa Monica Outlook newspaper, California State Highway Commissioner, and a longtime advocate for the freeway.

== See also ==
- California Incline
