= Interstate 10 in California =

Interstate Highway in California

Interstate 10
- Pearl Harbor Memorial Highway
- I-10 highlighted in red

Route information
- Maintained by Caltrans
- Length: 242.54 mi (390.33 km) (includes overlap with I-5 in Los Angeles)
- Existed: August 7, 1947, by FHWA; July 1, 1964, by Caltrans–present
- NHS: Entire route

Major junctions
- West end: SR 1 in Santa Monica
- I-405 in Los Angeles; I-110 / SR 110 in Los Angeles; I-5 / US 101 / SR 60 in Los Angeles; I-710 in Monterey Park; I-605 in Baldwin Park; I-15 in Ontario; I-215 in Colton; SR 210 in Redlands; SR 60 in Beaumont; US 95 in Blythe
- East end: I-10 / US 95 at the Arizona state line (Blythe–Ehrenberg, AZ line)

Location
- Country: United States
- State: California
- Counties: Los Angeles, San Bernardino, Riverside

Highway system
- Interstate Highway System; Main; Auxiliary; Suffixed; Business; Future; State highways in California; Interstate; US; State; Scenic; History; Pre‑1964; Unconstructed; Deleted; Freeways
← SR 9	→ SR 11

Interstate 10 (I-10) is a transcontinental Interstate Highway in the United States, stretching from Santa Monica, California, to Jacksonville, Florida. The segment of I-10 in California, also known as the Pearl Harbor Memorial Highway, runs east from Santa Monica through Los Angeles, San Bernardino, and Palm Springs before crossing into the state of Arizona. In the Greater Los Angeles area, it is known as the Santa Monica and San Bernardino freeways, linked by a short concurrency on I-5 (Golden State Freeway) at the East Los Angeles Interchange. I-10 also has parts designated as the Rosa Parks and Sonny Bono Memorial freeways. Some parts were also formerly designated as the Christopher Columbus Transcontinental Highway. However, the California State Legislature removed this designation following the passage of a bill on August 31, 2022. I-10 is also known colloquially as "the 10" to Southern California residents.

== Route description ==
Time-lapse video of a trip on I-10 from Baldwin Park to its western terminus in Santa Monica

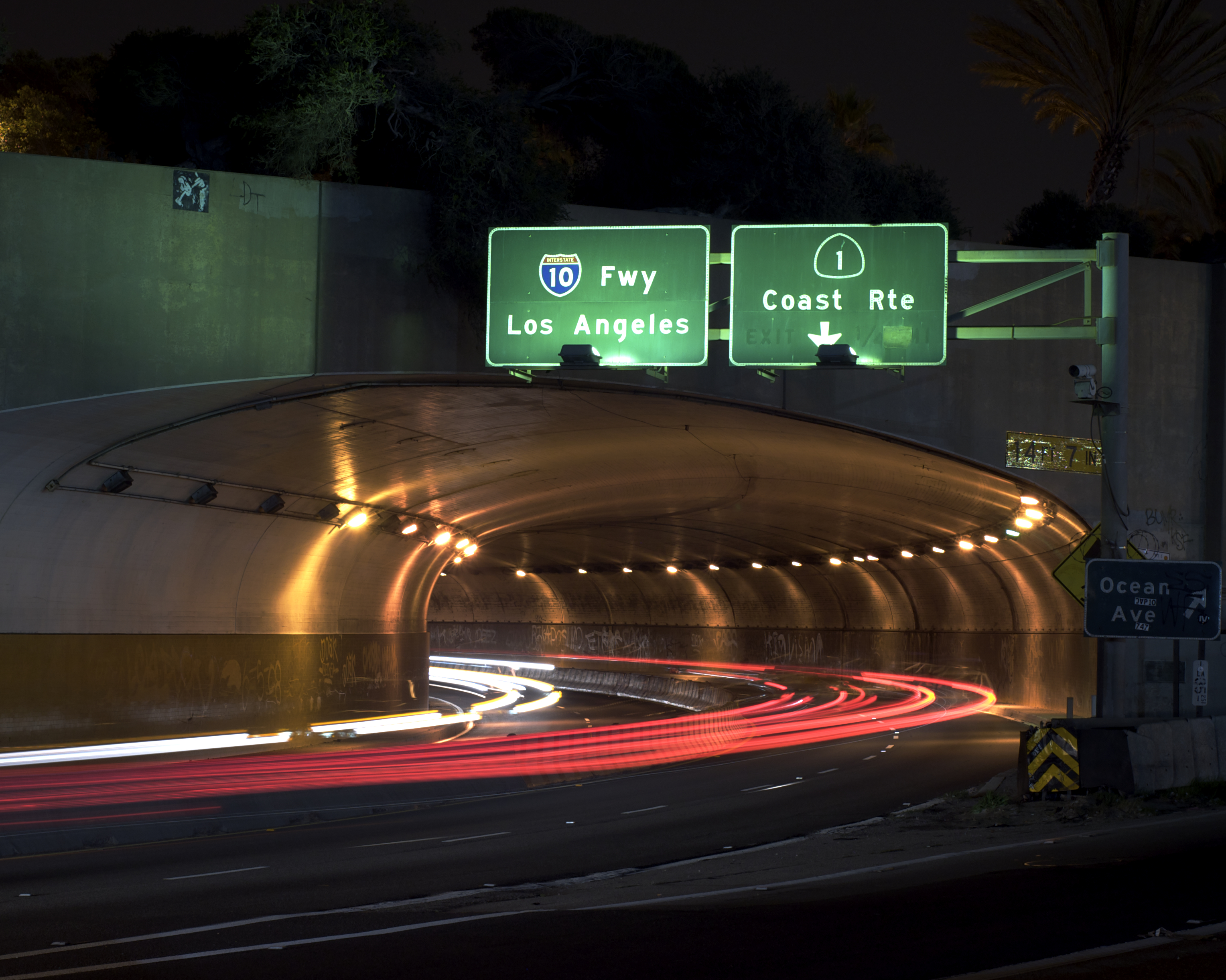
I-10 is signed as if it begins at the McClure Tunnel in Santa Monica, although it legally begins farther east at the SR 1 interchange at Lincoln Boulevard.

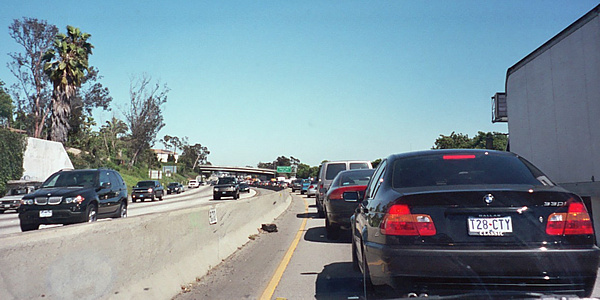
A typical traffic jam on the Santa Monica Freeway, at 2:30 pm on a Wednesday afternoon near Robertson Boulevard

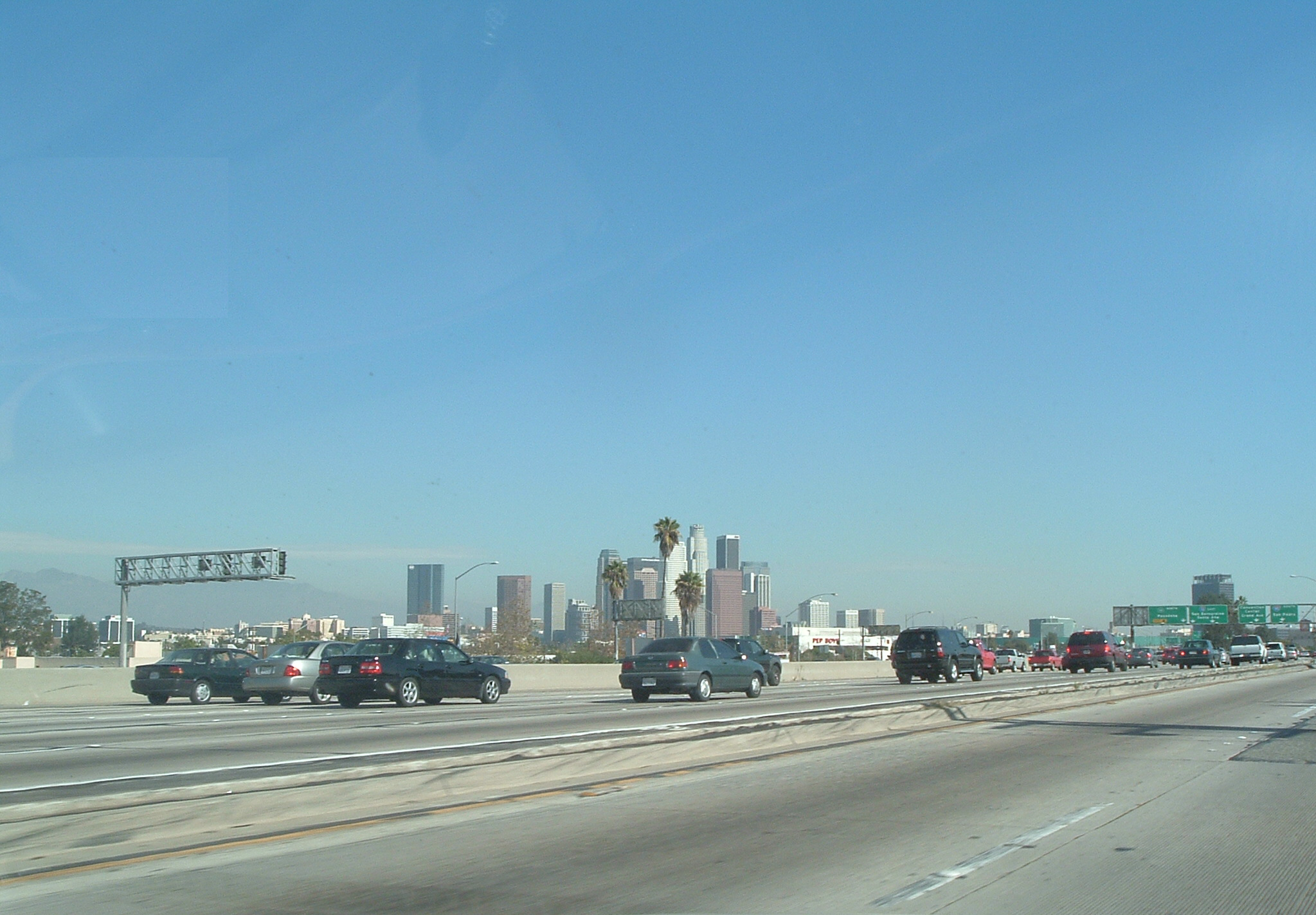
Downtown Los Angeles skyline as seen from the freeway. A slight (smaller than usual rush hour) traffic jam is ahead.

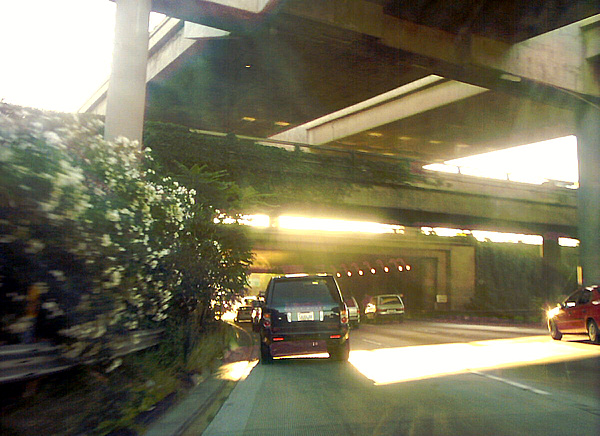
The Dosan Ahn Chang Ho Memorial Interchange (I-110), as seen by traffic going westbound on the Santa Monica

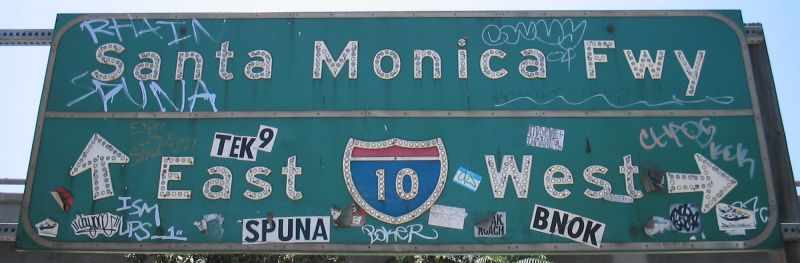
Heavily defaced button copy sign marking an entrance to the Santa Monica Freeway in Downtown Los Angeles, 2005

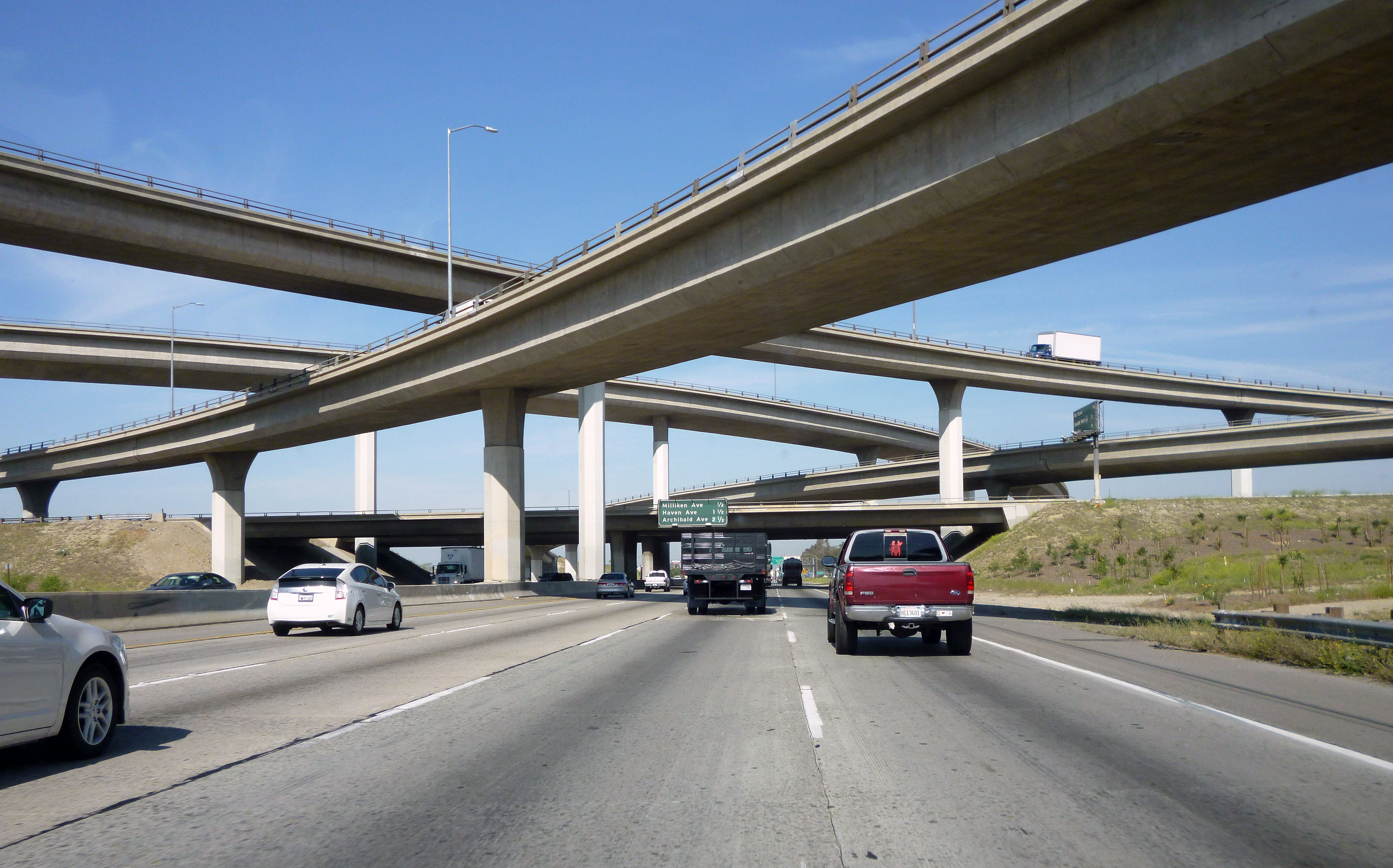
Interchange with the Ontario Freeway (I-15) as seen by westbound traffic on the San Bernardino Freeway

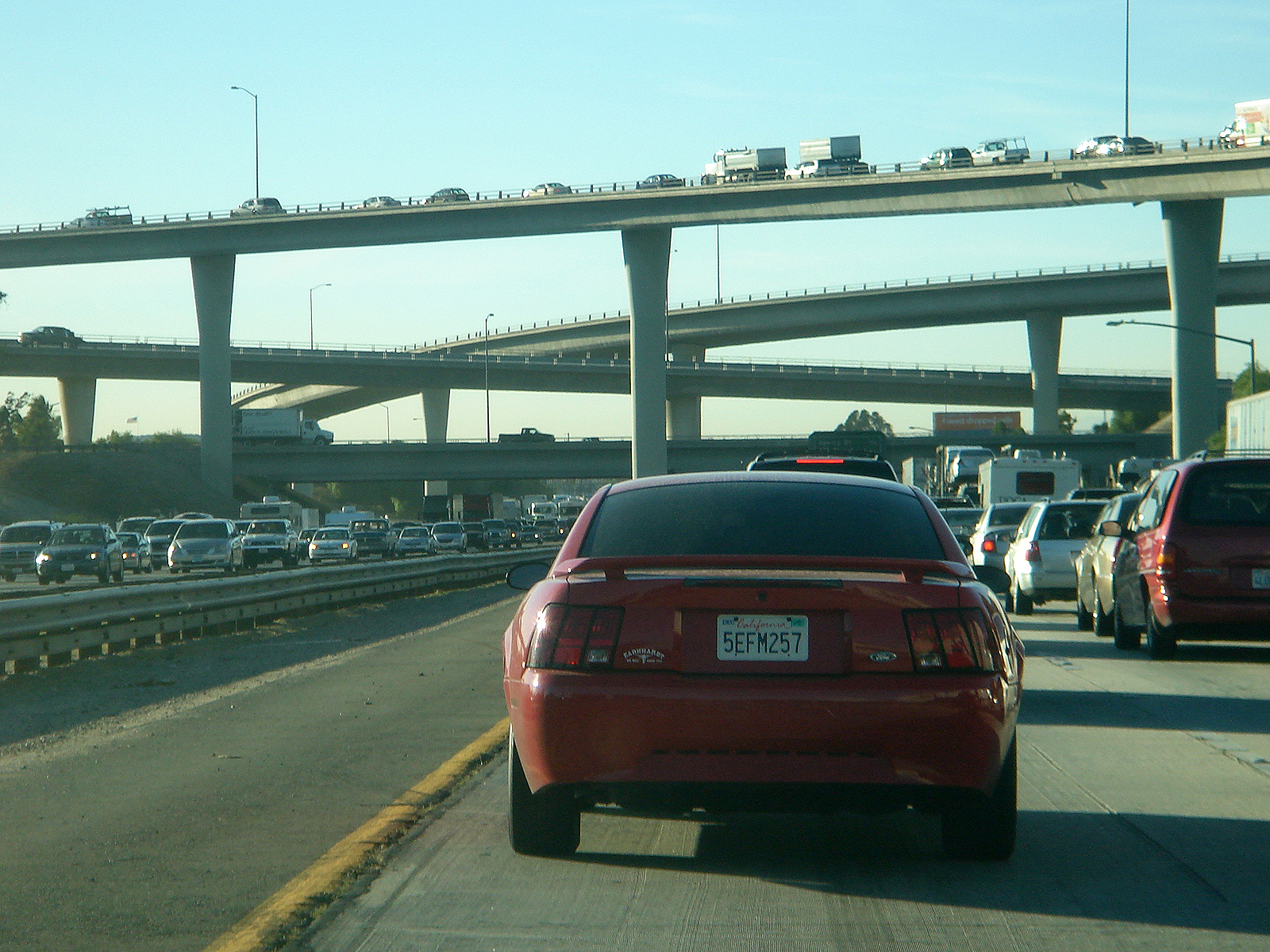
Heavy traffic from Downtown San Bernardino along the San Bernardino Freeway near the interchange with I-215

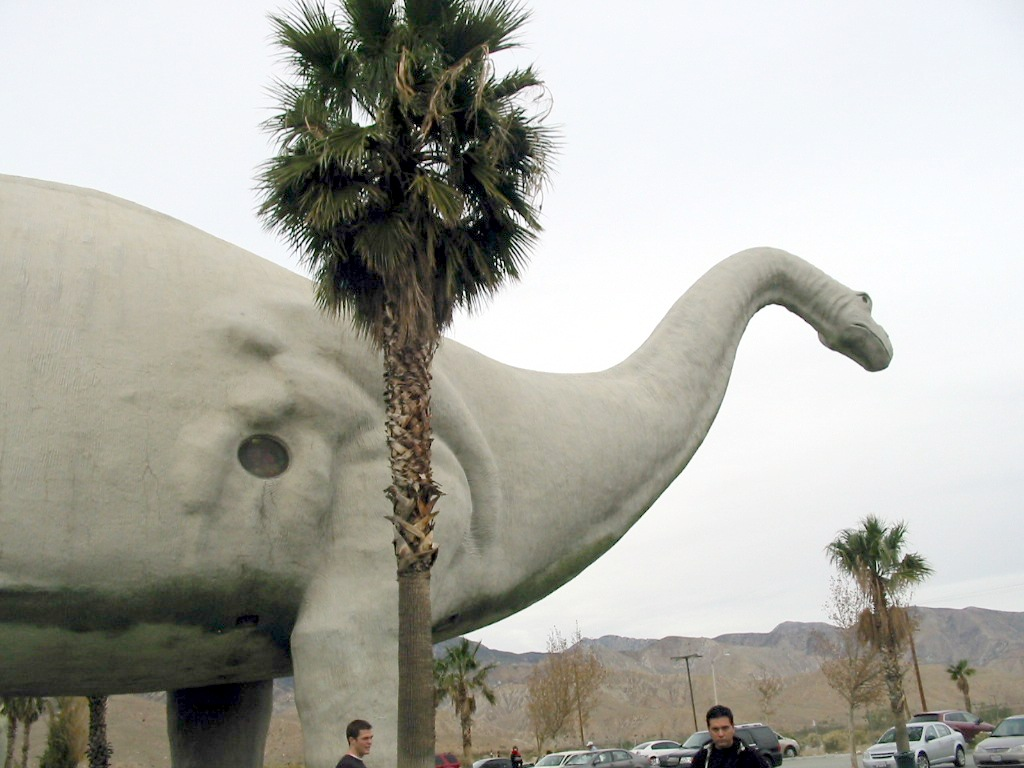
Cabazon Dinosaurs is a roadside attraction at the Main Street exit in Cabazon

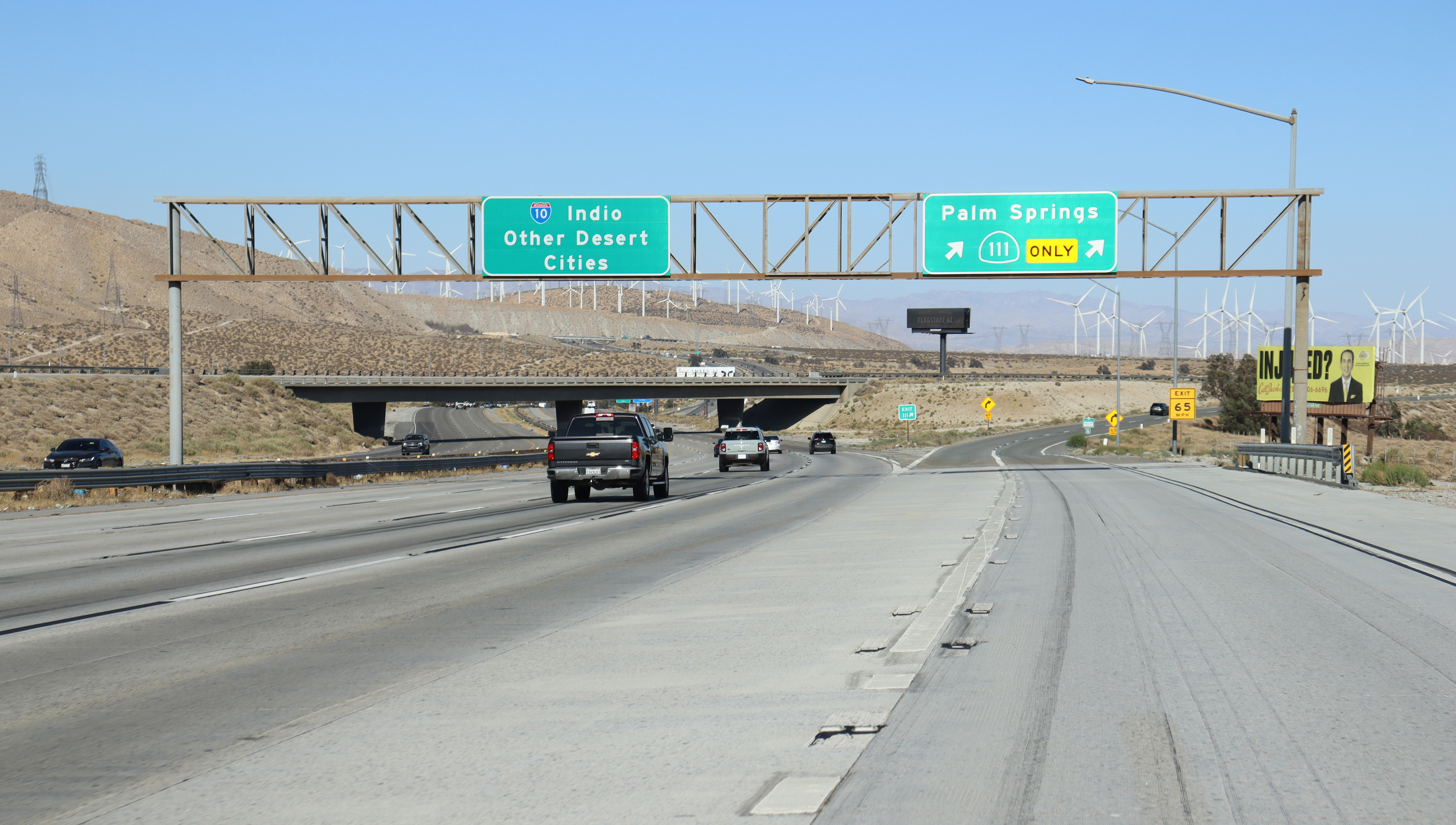
I-10 eastbound in Whitewater at the exit for SR 111, looking east with the San Gorgonio Pass wind farm in the background. Note the overhead sign which gives "Indio [¶] Other Desert Cities" as the control cities.

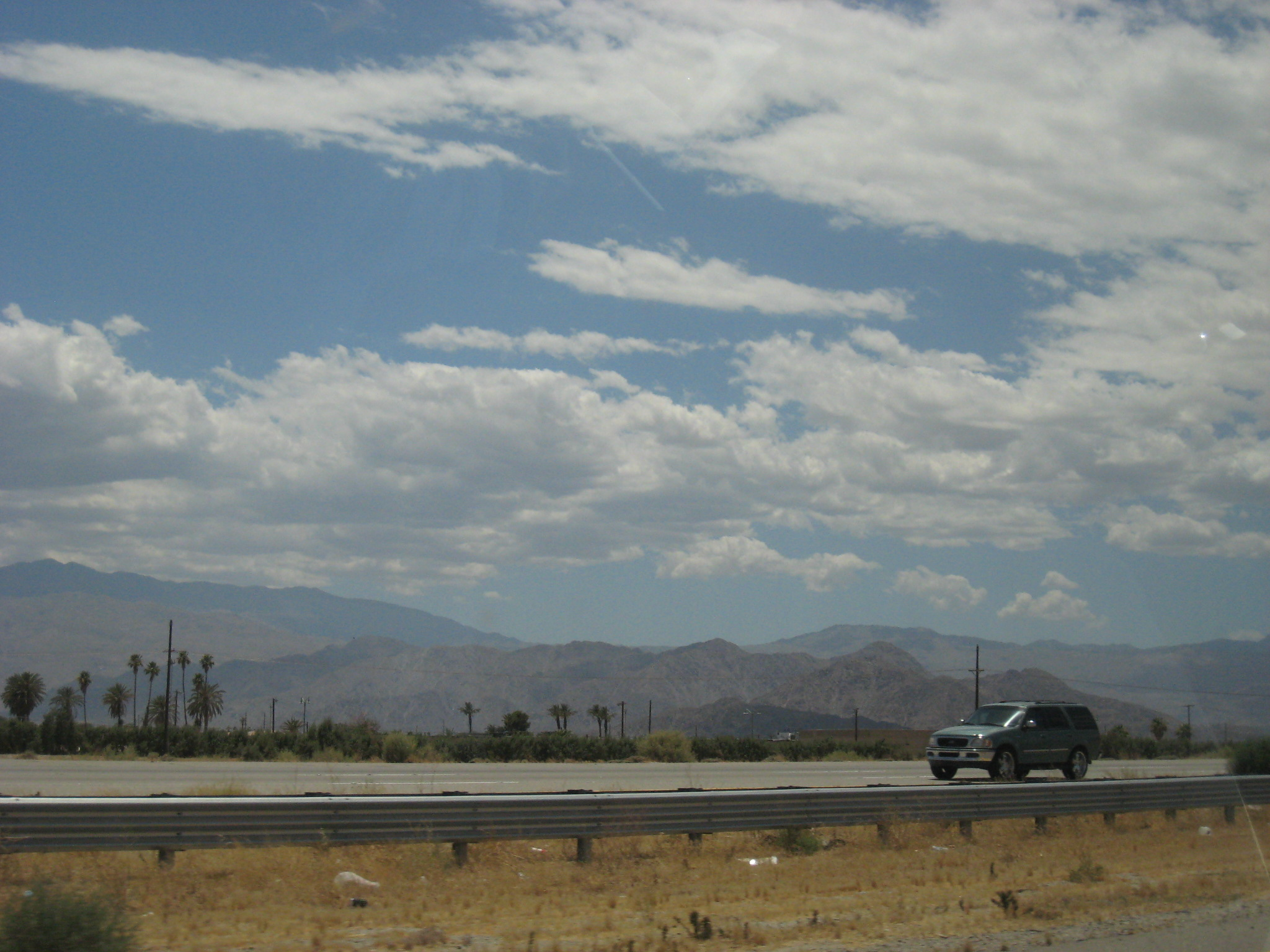
I-10 eastbound near Indio

The entirety of Interstate 10 in California is defined in section 310 of the California Streets and Highways Code as Route 10, and that the highway is from:

(a) Route 1 [State Route 1 (SR 1)] in Santa Monica to Route 5 [I-5] near Seventh Street in Los Angeles.
(b) Route 101 [US Route 101 (US 101)] near Mission Road in Los Angeles to the Arizona state line at the Colorado River via the vicinity of Monterey Park, Pomona, Colton, Indio, and Chiriaco Summit and via Blythe.

Because I-10 west of I-5 cannot access US 101, and I-10 east of I-5 cannot access US 101 southbound, signage instead directs motorists to the continuation of I-10 via I-5 between the East Los Angeles Interchange and the Santa Monica Freeway. The Federal Highway Administration (FHWA)'s Interstate Highway route logs, along with most maps, also indicate that I-10 is cosigned along this segment, despite the legal definition. The short unsigned section of Route 10 between Route 5 and Route 101, which was formerly defined as Route 110 (signed as I-110) until 1968, carries overhead signage for I-10 eastbound and for US 101 westbound.

I-10 is part of the California Freeway and Expressway System and is part of the National Highway System, a network of highways that are considered essential to the country's economy, defense, and mobility by the FHWA. I-10 is eligible to be included in the State Scenic Highway System, but it is not officially designated as a scenic highway by Caltrans. The Santa Monica Freeway is I-10 from SR 1 to I-5, as named by the State Highway Commission on April 25, 1957. The section between the Harbor (I-110) and San Diego (I-405) freeways is also signed as the Rosa Parks Freeway, after the African-American civil rights activist. The I-10 freeway is signed as the Christopher Columbus Transcontinental Highway in Santa Monica. The removal of this designation, however, may result in the eventual removal of this signage.

=== Santa Monica Freeway ===
The Santa Monica Freeway is the westernmost segment of I-10, beginning at the east end of the McClure Tunnel in Santa Monica and ending southeast of Downtown Los Angeles at the East Los Angeles Interchange.

I-10 begins its eastward journey in the city of Santa Monica after SR 1 turns east through the McClure Tunnel. Note that the McClure Tunnel is part of SR 1 in its entirety, and the western terminus of I-10 is to the east of the tunnel at 4th Street. SR 1 then exits onto Lincoln Boulevard and heads south while I-10 continues east. Soon after it enters the city of Los Angeles, I-10 has a four-level interchange with I-405. I-10 then continues through Sawtelle, Rancho Park, Cheviot Hills, Beverlywood, and Crestview in West Los Angeles; Lafayette Square and Wellington Square in Mid City; and Arlington Heights, West Adams, and Jefferson Park into Downtown Los Angeles. On the western edge of downtown at the Dosan Ahn Chang Ho Memorial Interchange, I-10 has an interchange with I-110 to the south and SR 110 to the north. I-10 then travels along the southern edge of downtown to the East Los Angeles Interchange.

At the East Los Angeles Interchange, SR 60 diverges east toward Riverside and Pomona. I-10 then turns north, running concurrently with I-5 for approximately 1.5 miles (2.4 km). Then, I-10 heads east and merges with the traffic from the spur to US 101 onto the San Bernardino Freeway.

The freeway is 14 lanes wide (two local and five express lanes in each direction) from the Harbor Freeway (I-110) interchange to the Arlington Avenue offramp. Most of these lanes are full at peak travel times (even on Saturdays). The remainder of the freeway varies between eight and 10 lanes in width. The whole freeway opened in 1965 with four to six lanes, with a formal dedication held in 1966.

While the construction of the Century Freeway several miles to the south reduced traffic congestion to a considerable amount by creating an alternate route from downtown to Los Angeles International Airport, the Santa Monica Freeway is still one of the busiest freeways in the world. All three freeway-to-freeway interchanges along its length are notorious for their congestion and are routinely ranked among the top 10 most congested spots in the US.

Due to the high traffic volume, car accidents are so common that Caltrans has constructed special accident investigation sites separated from the freeway by fences. These enable the California Highway Patrol to quickly clear accidents from the through traffic lanes, and the fences reduce congestion by preventing rubbernecking (in which vehicles slow down so their occupants can watch the accident investigation).

The Santa Monica Freeway is considered the border between Downtown and South Los Angeles. Part of the freeway also skims the Byzantine-Latino Quarter.

=== San Bernardino Freeway ===
I-10 heads east from the East Los Angeles Interchange to I-710 in Monterey Park. It then continues through the San Gabriel Valley suburbs of Alhambra, Rosemead, San Gabriel, El Monte, and Baldwin Park before intersecting with I-605. It then travels through West Covina, briefly enters Covina, and then travels up the Kellogg Hill into San Dimas, where I-10 intersects with SR 57 (formerly part of I-210) and SR 71 at the Kellogg Interchange. I-10 then heads east through Pomona and Claremont, leaving Los Angeles County to enter San Bernardino County.

In San Bernardino County, I-10 travels through Montclair, Upland, and Ontario, providing access to Ontario International Airport. I-10 then has a four-level interchange with I-15 before traveling through Fontana, Rialto, and Colton. I-10 then intersects with I-215, where the San Bernardino Freeway ends, before briefly entering San Bernardino city proper and traveling through Loma Linda and Redlands. In Redlands, I-10 intersects with the SR 210 freeway (future I-210) and with SR 38 before entering Yucaipa and eventually Riverside County.

In 2019, SBCTA planned to add two more interchanges in Fontana at Beech and Alder Avenues to reduce congestion at the Sierra and Cherry avenue exits.

=== Riverside County ===
In Riverside County, I-10 goes through Calimesa before entering Beaumont and merging with the eastern end of SR 60 (itself formerly the California segment of US 60). In Banning, I-10 has a diamond intersection with SR 243 before passing through San Gorgonio Pass between the San Bernardino and San Jacinto mountains (where the vegetation makes a rapid change between Mediterranean and desert ecology) and entering Palm Springs. The next 35 miles (56 km) of the freeway, between SR 111 and Dillon Road, was named the Sonny Bono Memorial Freeway in 2002. Although I-10 intersects with the northern terminus of SR 111, the major artery to Palm Springs, it mostly bypasses the city, then connects to SR 62, a major east–west route through the Colorado Desert. I-10 cuts through Cathedral City and passes just outside the northern city limits of Rancho Mirage, Palm Desert, and La Quinta before entering Indio. I-10 then has an interchange in Coachella with the northern end of the SR 86 expressway, which also leads to SR 111.

Several miles east and roughly halfway between Indio and Blythe, in the community of Desert Center, I-10 intersects with SR 177, a turnoff that leads to Desert Center Airport and connects to SR 62. Three miles (4.8 km) south of I-10 at the Wiley's Well exit, between Desert Center and Blythe, are the Chuckawalla Valley and Ironwood state prisons. Near the Arizona state line, I-10 meets the terminus of SR 78. In the city of Blythe, I-10 runs concurrently with US 95 as both routes cross the Colorado River into Arizona.

The speed limit on the entire Riverside County segment of I-10 is 70 mph (110 km/h). I-10 westbound is usually signed as toward San Bernardino and/or Los Angeles in the Colorado Desert. Eastbound, in the San Gorgonio Pass, the signage indicates "Indio, Other Desert Cities" and indicates "Blythe" after Indio; the first sign for Phoenix does not occur until Indio.

== Express lanes ==
There are two non-contiguous sections of high-occupancy toll (HOT) lanes along I-10. The El Monte Busway in Los Angeles County is a grade-separated, shared-use HOT and express bus corridor that runs between between Alameda Street near Union Station in Downtown Los Angeles and a point west of I-605 in El Monte. From Alameda Street to I-710, the El Monte Busway runs parallel to the north side of the freeway. After the I-710 interchange, these lanes merge back to the median of I-10. Eastbound busses exit at El Monte station in El Monte before the HOT lanes for other vehicles end west of I-605. The bus route of the El Monte Busway between Alameda Street and El Monte station's bus entrance at Santa Anita Avenue carries the hidden state designation of Route 10S (for "supplemental"). The HOT lanes along I-10 then resume at Monte Vista Avenue in Montclair in San Bernardino County, and extend to Etiwanda Avenue at the Ontario–Fontana border.

There are long-term plans to eventually complete a continuous HOT lane network that stretches from Alameda Street to Ford Street in Redlands. As of 2024, the section to bridge the gap between I-605 and Monte Vista Avenue by converting the existing HOV lanes to HOT lanes is under environmental review. The project to extend the HOT lanes east to Pepper Avenue in Colton was planned to break ground in 2025, and the further extension to Ford Street in Redlands is still in the planning stage.

As of January 2026, some toll polices differ between the counties. The HOT lanes in Los Angeles County are part of the Metro ExpressLanes project administered by the Los Angeles County Metropolitan Transportation Authority (LA Metro). The ones in San Bernardino County, branded as the San Bernardino Express Lanes, are operated by the San Bernardino County Transportation Authority (SBCTA) and use Transportation Corridor Agencies (TCA) as the processing partner. In both segments, solo drivers are tolled using a congestion pricing system based on the real-time levels of traffic. Carpools with three or more people and motorcycles are not charged. For two-person carpools using the Los Angeles County segment, they are charged the posted toll during the peak hours between 5:00 am and 9:00 am, and between 4:00 pm and 7:00 pm; no toll is charged during off-peak hours. Two-person carpools using the San Bernardino County segment do not receive any discount. All tolls are collected using an open road tolling system, and therefore there are no toll booths to receive cash. Each vehicle using the HOT lanes is required to carry a FasTrak Flex transponder with its switch set to indicate the number of the vehicle's occupants (1, 2, or 3+). Solo drivers may also use the FasTrak standard tag without the switch.

Drivers without any FasTrak tag will be assessed a toll violation regardless of whether they qualified for free. For those violators on the San Bernardino County segment, they will get TCA's benefit of being able to pay online 5 days after their trip without an additional toll violation penalty.

== History ==
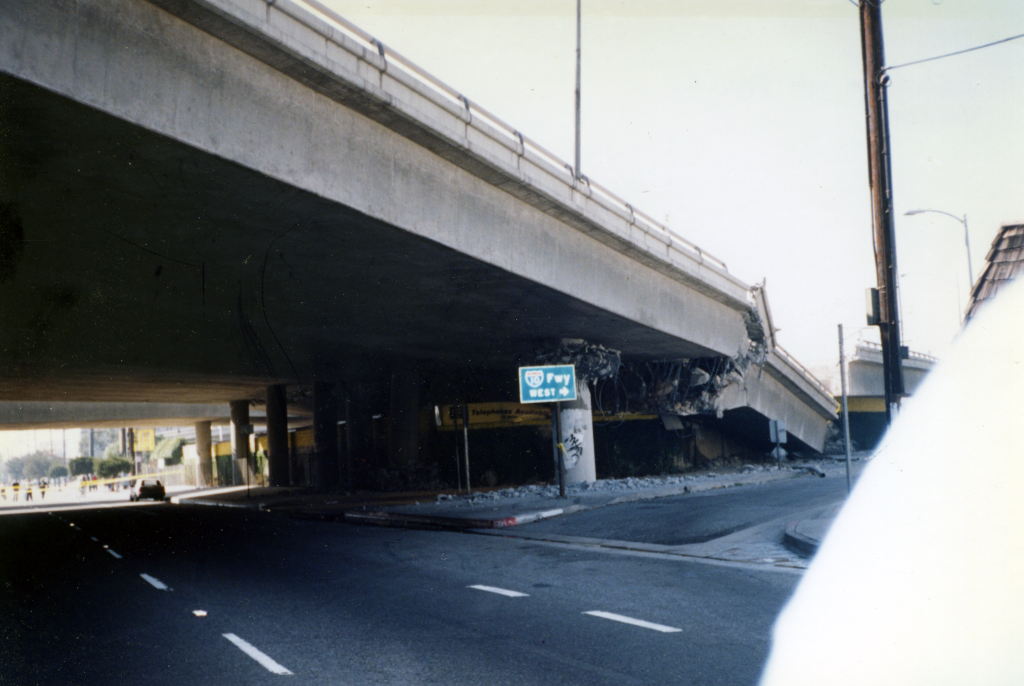
I-10 after the 1994 collapse

What is now I-10 east of Los Angeles was generally part of the Atlantic and Pacific Highway, one of many transcontinental national auto trails. By 1926, when the US Numbered Highways were assigned, the road across the desert east of Indio was unimproved, while the road from Indio west to San Bernardino (as well as various roads west to Los Angeles) was paved. In late 1926, US 99 was designated along the section of road from San Bernardino to Indio, where it turned south along present SR 86 on the west side of the Salton Sea. West of San Bernardino, US 99 ran to Los Angeles, concurrent with US 66 (via Pasadena) before turning north; this route to Los Angeles is north of the later alignment of I-10. The piece of this between San Bernardino and Indio was defined in 1915 as Legislative Route 26 (LR 26). (It continued south from Indio via El Centro to Heber. A 1931 extension took it south to Calexico on present SR 111.)

The route from Indio via Mecca to the Arizona state line near Blythe was defined in 1919 as pre-1964 LR 64. (Later extensions took LR 64 west along present SR 74; a 1931 cutoff bypassed Mecca to the north.) LR 26 was extended west from San Bernardino to Los Angeles in 1931, running along an alignment south of the existing US 66/US 99. Neither of these was a signed route until around 1932, when US 60 was extended west from Arizona to Los Angeles, running along LR 64 to Indio, LR 26 (with US 99) to Beaumont, pre-1964 LR 19 to Pomona, and LR 26 to Los Angeles. (The original alignment of LR 26 ran roughly where SR 60 now is west of Pomona, but an alignment close to present I-10 opened around 1934).

Thus, in 1931, what is now I-10 east of Los Angeles had been defined as LR 26 from Los Angeles to Indio and LR 64 from Indio to Arizona. It was signed as US 99 from San Bernardino to Indio, and US 60 came along around 1932 from Los Angeles to Pomona and from Beaumont to Arizona. US 70 was extended west from Arizona c. 1936 along the whole route to Los Angeles, and, between 1933 and 1942, US 99 moved from US 66 to present I-10 between San Bernardino and Los Angeles, forming a three-way concurrency between Pomona and Los Angeles. Old alignments and names include Valley Boulevard, Ramona Boulevard, and Garvey Avenue.

I-10 holds the distinction of being the first freeway in Los Angeles. A four-mile (6.4 km) section of today's freeway was built between 1933 and 1935 at a cost of $877,000 (equivalent to $16.2 million in 2025). The "Ramona Boulevard" highway linked downtown Los Angeles to the communities of the southern San Gabriel Valley. The roadway, which opened on April 20, 1935, was dubbed the "Air Line route" and was seen as a major achievement in traffic design.

The route east from Los Angeles was added to the Interstate Highway System on August 7, 1957. It was assigned the I-10 number on August 14, 1957, and the short piece west of I-5 was approved as I-110 on November 10, 1958. By then, most if not all of the San Bernardino Freeway had been completed, and I-10 was signed along the existing freeway along with US 70, US 99, and part of US 60. US 70 and US 99 were removed in the 1964 renumbering, while US 60 was removed in 1972, leaving only I-10.

The part west of Downtown Los Angeles was pre-1964 LR 173, defined in 1933 from Santa Monica to Downtown Los Angeles. It was signed as SR 26 by 1942, running primarily Olympic Boulevard. It was later replaced by the Santa Monica Freeway and added to the Interstate Highway System on September 15, 1955. It too was assigned the I-10 number on August 14, 1957. It was completed c. 1964 and became I-10 in the 1964 renumbering.

Portions of the Santa Monica Freeway going over La Cienega Boulevard collapsed after the Northridge earthquake on January 17, 1994, and were rebuilt using new seismic-resistant bridge designs.

The El Monte Busway was converted to HOT lanes in 2013 as part of the Metro ExpressLanes project.

On July 19, 2015, a bridge carrying the eastbound lanes of I-10 near Desert Center collapsed from floodwater from the remnants of Hurricane Dolores, trapping a vehicle.

Shortly after midnight of November 11, 2023, a mile-long (1.6 km) segment of the freeway in Downtown Los Angeles between Alameda Street and Santa Fe Avenue suffered significant damage due to a fire at a pallet yard underneath the freeway. The fire melted the freeway's guardrails and damaged the supporting concrete columns. The Los Angeles Times reported a couple of days later that "sanitizer accumulated during the height of the COVID-19 pandemic was stored under the overpass and helped fuel the flames". Governor Gavin Newsom declared a state of emergency in response to the fire; the freeway was reopened after eight days, far ahead of the original five-week estimate.

=== Juan Bautista de Anza National Historic Trail ===
The I-10 is part of the auto tour route of the Juan Bautista de Anza National Historic Trail, a National Park Service unit in the US national Historic and Millennium trail programs. In 2005, Caltrans began posting signs on roads that overlap with the historic 1776 Juan Bautista de Anza trail route, so that California drivers can now follow the trail.

== Exit list ==
County	Location	mi	km	Exit	Destinations	Notes
Los Angeles	Santa Monica	0.00	0.00		SR 1 north (Pacific Coast Highway) – Oxnard	Western end of SR 1 concurrency; former US 101 Alternate; western end of I-10/Santa Monica Freeway
Los Angeles	Santa Monica	0.00	0.00	1A	4th Street / 5th Street	Westbound exit and eastbound entrance
Los Angeles	Santa Monica	0.96	1.54	1B	Lincoln Boulevard to SR 1 south	Eastern end of SR 1 concurrency; signed as exit 1A eastbound; former SR 2 / US 66 / US 101 Alternate
Los Angeles	Santa Monica	0.96	1.54	1B	20th Street	Eastbound exit and westbound entrance
Los Angeles	Santa Monica	2.08	3.35	1C	Cloverfield Boulevard	Westbound exit and eastbound entrance
Los Angeles	Santa Monica	2.30	3.70	2A	Centinela Avenue	Signed as exit 2 eastbound
Los Angeles	Los Angeles	2.35	3.78	2B-C	Bundy Drive	Westbound exits and eastbound entrance; signed as exits 2B (south) and 2C (north)
Los Angeles	Los Angeles	3.11	5.01	3A	I-405 north (San Diego Freeway) – Sacramento	I-405 north exit 53B, south exit 53
Los Angeles	Los Angeles	3.29	5.29	3B	I-405 south (San Diego Freeway) – LAX Airport, Long Beach	I-405 north exit 53B, south exit 53
Los Angeles	Los Angeles	4.24	6.82	4	Overland Avenue / National Boulevard	National Boulevard not signed westbound
Los Angeles	Los Angeles	5.05	8.13	5	National Boulevard	Westbound exit and eastbound entrance
Los Angeles	Los Angeles	5.76	9.27	6	Robertson Boulevard – Culver City	
Los Angeles	Los Angeles	6.81	10.96	7A	SR 187 (Venice Boulevard) / La Cienega Boulevard	SR 187 / Venice Boulevard not signed eastbound
Los Angeles	Los Angeles	7.00	11.27	7B	Fairfax Avenue / Washington Boulevard	Washington Boulevard not signed eastbound
Los Angeles	Los Angeles	8.27	13.31	8	La Brea Avenue	
Los Angeles	Los Angeles	9.23	14.85	9	Crenshaw Boulevard	
Los Angeles	Los Angeles	10.16	16.35	10	Arlington Avenue	
Los Angeles	Los Angeles	10.66	17.16	11	Western Avenue / Normandie Avenue	
Los Angeles	Los Angeles	11.64	18.73	12	Vermont Avenue / Hoover Street	
Los Angeles	Los Angeles	12.68	20.41	13A	I-110 south (Harbor Freeway south) / Grand Avenue – San Pedro, Convention Center	Dosan Ahn Chang Ho Memorial Interchange; signed as exit 13 westbound; Grand Avenue is not accessible westbound; Pico Boulevard is not accessible eastbound; I-110 exit 21
Los Angeles	Los Angeles	12.73	20.49	13B	SR 110 north (Harbor Freeway north) / Pico Boulevard – Pasadena, Downtown, Convention Center	Dosan Ahn Chang Ho Memorial Interchange; signed as exit 13 westbound; Grand Avenue is not accessible westbound; Pico Boulevard is not accessible eastbound; I-110 exit 21
Los Angeles	Los Angeles	13.64	21.95	14A	Maple Avenue	Eastbound exit and westbound entrance
Los Angeles	Los Angeles	13.64	21.95	14A	Los Angeles Street – Convention Center	Westbound exit and eastbound entrance
Los Angeles	Los Angeles	14.22	22.88	14B	San Pedro Street	No westbound entrance
Los Angeles	Los Angeles	14.55	23.42	15A	Central Avenue	
Los Angeles	Los Angeles	15.19	24.45	15B	Alameda Street	
Los Angeles	Los Angeles	15.55	25.03	16A	Mateo Street / Santa Fe Avenue	
Los Angeles	Los Angeles	16.23	26.12	16B	SR 60 east (Pomona Freeway) – Pomona	Eastbound exit and westbound entrance; western end of East Los Angeles Interchange; SR 60 west exit 1A; I-5 north exit 134A
Los Angeles	Los Angeles	16.23	26.12	16B	I-5 south (Santa Ana Freeway) – Santa Ana	Eastbound exit and westbound entrance; western end of East Los Angeles Interchange; SR 60 west exit 1A; I-5 north exit 134A
Los Angeles	Los Angeles	16.23	26.12	—	Boyle Avenue	Eastbound exit only
Los Angeles	Los Angeles	16.23	26.12	16B	I-5 south (Santa Ana Freeway) / Soto Street – Santa Ana	Western end of I-5 overlap; eastern end of East Los Angeles Interchange proper; westbound exit and eastbound entrance; eastern end of Santa Monica Freeway; SR 60 west exit 1E
Los Angeles	Los Angeles	16.23	26.12	16B	SR 60 east (Pomona Freeway) – Pomona	Western end of I-5 overlap; eastern end of East Los Angeles Interchange proper; westbound exit and eastbound entrance; eastern end of Santa Monica Freeway; SR 60 west exit 1E
Los Angeles	Los Angeles			135A (Note: Exit number follows I-5 rather than I-10.)	Fourth Street	
Los Angeles	Los Angeles			135B	Cesar Chavez Avenue	Eastbound exit and westbound entrance; formerly Brooklyn Avenue
Los Angeles	Los Angeles	19.00– 19.07	30.58– 30.69	19A	State Street	Westbound left exit and eastbound entrance
Los Angeles	Los Angeles	19.00– 19.07	30.58– 30.69	19B	I-5 north (Golden State Freeway) – Sacramento	Eastern end of I-5 overlap; 5-10 Split portion of the East Los Angeles Interchange; I-5 north exit 135C, south exit 135B
Los Angeles	Los Angeles	19.00– 19.07	30.58– 30.69	19B	San Bernardino Freeway spur to US 101 north (Santa Ana Freeway) – Los Angeles	Westbound left exit and eastbound entrance; US 101 exit 1D
Los Angeles	Los Angeles	19.00– 19.07	30.58– 30.69	19C	Soto Street	No eastbound entrance; signed as exit 19 eastbound
Los Angeles	Los Angeles			—	Marengo Street	Eastbound entrance only
Los Angeles	East Los Angeles	19.59	31.53	20A	City Terrace Drive	Eastbound exit and westbound entrance
Los Angeles	East Los Angeles	20.24	32.57	20B	Eastern Avenue	Westbound access is part of the I-710 exit; serves CSU Los Angeles
Los Angeles	Monterey Park	20.77	33.43	21	I-710 (Long Beach Freeway) / Valley Boulevard – Long Beach	Eastbound exit provides direct access to Ramona Road; I-710 north exit 22, south exits 22A-B
Los Angeles	Alhambra			—	El Monte Busway (SR 10S west) to US 101 north / Alameda Street	Express Lanes access only; westbound exit and eastbound entrance
Los Angeles	Alhambra			—	I-10 LA Metro Express Lanes	Westernmost access point from mainline I-10
Los Angeles	Alhambra	21.70	34.92	22	Fremont Avenue – South Pasadena	
Los Angeles	Alhambra	22.72	36.56	23A	Atlantic Boulevard – Monterey Park	
Los Angeles	Alhambra	23.38	37.63	23B	Garfield Avenue	
Los Angeles	Alhambra–San Gabriel– Monterey Park tripoint	24.22	38.98	24	New Avenue	
Los Angeles	San Gabriel–Rosemead line	24.72	39.78	—	Del Mar Avenue	Express Lanes access only; eastbound exit and westbound entrance
Los Angeles	San Gabriel–Rosemead line	24.72	39.78	25A	Del Mar Avenue	Previously exit 25B
Los Angeles	San Gabriel–Rosemead line	25.23	40.60	25B	San Gabriel Boulevard	
Los Angeles	Rosemead	25.73	41.41	26A	Walnut Grove Avenue	
Los Angeles	Rosemead–El Monte line	26.25	42.25	26B	SR 19 (Rosemead Boulevard) – Pasadena	Eastbound exit provides direct access to Flair Drive
Los Angeles	Rosemead–El Monte line	27.35	44.02	27	Temple City Boulevard	Westbound signage; previously exit 28
Los Angeles	Rosemead–El Monte line	27.35	44.02	27	Baldwin Avenue	Eastbound signage
Los Angeles	Rosemead–El Monte line	27.35	44.02	—	El Monte Busway (SR 10S east) to El Monte station	Buses only via Express Lanes; eastbound exit and westbound entrance
Los Angeles	El Monte	28.06	45.16	28	Santa Anita Avenue	Previously exit 29
Los Angeles	El Monte	28.89	46.49	29A	Peck Road South	
Los Angeles	El Monte	28.94– 29.22	46.57– 47.03	29B	Peck Road North, Valley Boulevard	Westbound exits signed as 29B (Valley Boulevard) and 29C (Peck Road North)
Los Angeles	El Monte			—	I-10 LA Metro Express Lanes	Eastern end of Express Lanes
Los Angeles	El Monte			—	I-10 LA Metro Express Lanes (eastern expansion)	Western end of proposed expansion
Los Angeles	El Monte	29.97	48.23	30	Garvey Avenue, Durfee Avenue	Westbound exit and eastbound entrance
Los Angeles	Baldwin Park	30.54	49.15	31A	I-605 south (San Gabriel River Freeway)	Signed as exit 31A westbound; I-605 exit 22
Los Angeles	Baldwin Park	30.59	49.23	31B	I-605 north (San Gabriel River Freeway)	Signed as exit 31A westbound; I-605 exit 22
Los Angeles	Baldwin Park	30.59– 30.93	49.23– 49.78	31C	Frazier Street	Signed as exit 31B westbound; no eastbound entrance
Los Angeles	Baldwin Park	31.61	50.87	32A	Baldwin Park Boulevard	
Los Angeles	Baldwin Park	32.05	51.58	32B	Francisquito Avenue – La Puente	No eastbound entrance; previously exit 33A
Los Angeles	Baldwin Park	32.74	52.69	33	Puente Avenue – Industry	
Los Angeles	West Covina	33.85	54.48	34A	Pacific Avenue, West Covina Parkway	Signed as exit 34 eastbound
Los Angeles	West Covina	34.24	55.10	34B	Sunset Avenue	Westbound exit only
Los Angeles	West Covina	34.78	55.97	35	Vincent Avenue	
Los Angeles	West Covina	35.89	57.76	36	SR 39 (Azusa Avenue)	
Los Angeles	West Covina	36.87	59.34	37A	Citrus Street	
Los Angeles	West Covina	37.40	60.19	37B	Barranca Street	
Los Angeles	West Covina	37.90	60.99	38A	Grand Avenue	
Los Angeles	West Covina–Covina line	38.39	61.78	38B	Holt Avenue	
Los Angeles	Covina–San Dimas line	39.85	64.13	40	Via Verde	
Los Angeles	Pomona	41.41	66.64	41	Kellogg Drive – Cal Poly University	No eastbound entrance
Los Angeles	Pomona–San Dimas line	41.83	67.32	42A	SR 57 (Orange Freeway) to I-210 (Foothill Freeway) – Santa Ana	Western end of Kellogg Interchange; signed as exit 42 westbound; SR 57 north is former I-210; SR 57 north exit 21, south exits 22A-B
Los Angeles	Pomona–San Dimas line	42.07	67.71	42B	SR 71 south (Chino Valley Freeway) / Campus Drive – Corona	Eastbound exit and westbound entrance; eastern end of Kellogg Interchange; SR 71 north exit 15
Los Angeles	Pomona	43.05– 43.58	69.28– 70.14	44	Fairplex Drive, Dudley Street	Signed as exits 43 (Fairplex Drive) and 44 (Dudley Street) eastbound; Fairplex Drive was formerly Ganesha Boulevard; serves Fairplex
Los Angeles	Pomona	44.67	71.89	45A	White Avenue	Eastbound exit and westbound entrance; former exit 45
Los Angeles	Pomona	45.12	72.61	45B	Garey Avenue, Orange Grove Avenue	Signed as exit 45 westbound; Orange Grove Avenue not signed eastbound
Los Angeles	Pomona	45.80	73.71	46	Towne Avenue	
Los Angeles	Claremont	47.13	75.85	47	Indian Hill Boulevard	
San Bernardino	Montclair			—	I-10 LA Metro Express Lanes (eastern expansion)	Western end of proposed expansion
San Bernardino	Montclair			—	I-10 San Bernardino Express Lanes	Western end of express lane; opened in 2024
San Bernardino	Montclair	48.34	77.80	48	Monte Vista Avenue	
San Bernardino	Montclair	48.89	78.68	49	Central Avenue	
San Bernardino	Ontario–Upland line	50.03	80.52	50	Mountain Avenue – Mount Baldy	
San Bernardino	Ontario–Upland line	51.13	82.29	51	SR 83 (Euclid Avenue) – Ontario, Upland	
San Bernardino	Ontario	52.90	85.13	53	4th Street	
San Bernardino	Ontario	53.76	86.52	54	Vineyard Avenue	
San Bernardino	Ontario	54.82	88.22	55A	Holt Boulevard	Westbound exit and eastbound entrance; former US 99 north
San Bernardino	Ontario	54.82	88.22	55B	Archibald Avenue – Ontario Airport	Single-point urban interchange, signed as exit 55 eastbound
San Bernardino	Ontario	55.83	89.85	56	Haven Avenue	
San Bernardino	Ontario	56.84	91.48	57	Milliken Avenue	
San Bernardino	Ontario	57.60	92.70	58A	I-15 north (Ontario Freeway) – Barstow	Signed as exit 58 westbound; I-15 exits 109A-B
San Bernardino	Ontario	57.60	92.70	58B	I-15 south (Ontario Freeway) – San Diego	Signed as exit 58 westbound; I-15 exits 109A-B
San Bernardino	Ontario–Fontana line	58.79	94.61	59	Etiwanda Avenue, Valley Boulevard	Valley Boulevard was former US 99 south
San Bernardino	Ontario–Fontana line			—	I-10 San Bernardino Express Lanes	Eastern end of express lane; opened in 2024
San Bernardino	Ontario–Fontana line			—	I-10 San Bernardino Express Lanes (eastern expansion)	Western end of proposed expansion
San Bernardino	Fontana	60.83	97.90	61	Cherry Avenue	
San Bernardino	Fontana	62.84	101.13	63	Citrus Avenue	
San Bernardino	Fontana	63.88	102.80	64	Sierra Avenue	Single-point urban interchange
San Bernardino	Bloomington	66.15	106.46	66	Cedar Avenue – Bloomington	
San Bernardino	Rialto	67.63	108.84	68	Riverside Avenue	
San Bernardino	Colton	68.63	110.45	69	Pepper Avenue	
San Bernardino	Colton	69.62	112.04	70A	Rancho Avenue	
San Bernardino	Colton	70.28	113.10	70B	9th Street – Downtown Colton	
San Bernardino	Colton	70.91	114.12	71	Mt. Vernon Avenue	
San Bernardino	Colton	71.90	115.71	72	I-215 – San Bernardino, Barstow, Riverside	Former I-15E / US 91 / US 395; eastern end of San Bernardino Freeway; I-215 north exit 40A-B, south exit 40
San Bernardino	San Bernardino	72.92	117.35	73	Waterman Avenue	Signed as exits 73A (south) and 73B (north) eastbound
San Bernardino	San Bernardino–Loma Linda line	73.93	118.98	74	Tippecanoe Avenue, Anderson Street – San Bernardino International Airport, Loma Linda University	
San Bernardino	Loma Linda	74.96	120.64	75	Mountain View Avenue	
San Bernardino	Redlands	75.96	122.25	76	California Street	
San Bernardino	Redlands	76.97	123.87	77A	Alabama Street	
San Bernardino	Redlands	77.29	124.39	77B	SR 210 west (Foothill Freeway) to SR 330 north – Pasadena, Running Springs	Former SR 30 west; SR 210 east exits 85A-B; future I-210 west; signed as exit 77C westbound
San Bernardino	Redlands	77.45	124.64	77C	Tennessee Street	Signed as exit 77B westbound
San Bernardino	Redlands	78.56	126.43	79	SR 38 east (Orange Street) / Eureka Street	Eastbound signage
San Bernardino	Redlands	78.56	126.43	79	6th Street to SR 38 – Big Bear	Westbound signage
San Bernardino	Redlands	79.53	127.99	80	University Street	Eastbound signage
San Bernardino	Redlands	79.53	127.99	80	Cypress Avenue	Westbound signage
San Bernardino	Redlands	80.79	130.02	81	Ford Street, Redlands Boulevard	Redlands Boulevard is former US 99 north
San Bernardino	Redlands			—	I-10 San Bernardino Express Lanes (eastern expansion)	Eastern end of proposed expansion
San Bernardino	Redlands	81.95	131.89	82	Wabash Avenue	Westbound exit and eastbound entrance
San Bernardino	Yucaipa	83.16	133.83	83	Yucaipa Boulevard	
San Bernardino	Yucaipa	84.69	136.30	85	Oak Glen Road, Live Oak Canyon Road	
San Bernardino	Yucaipa	85.63	137.81	Wildwood Rest Area (eastbound only)		
San Bernardino–Riverside county line	Yucaipa–Calimesa line	86.84	139.76	87	County Line Road	
Riverside	Calimesa	87.68	141.11	88	Calimesa Boulevard	Former US 99 north
Riverside	Calimesa	88.74	142.81	89	Singleton Road	Westbound exit and eastbound entrance
Riverside	Calimesa	89.87	144.63	90	Cherry Valley Boulevard – Cherry Valley	
Riverside	Calimesa	90.88	146.26	Brookside Rest Area (westbound only)		
Riverside	Beaumont	92.35	148.62	92	Oak Valley Parkway	
Riverside	Beaumont	93.49	150.46	93	SR 60 west (Moreno Valley Freeway) – Riverside	Left exit westbound; no westbound entrance; former US 60 west
Riverside	Beaumont	93.49	150.46	93	6th Street	Eastbound exit and westbound entrance; former US 60 east / US 99 south
Riverside	Beaumont	94.39	151.91	94	SR 79 south (Beaumont Avenue)	
Riverside	Beaumont	95.03	152.94	95	Pennsylvania Avenue	Westbound exit and eastbound entrance
Riverside	Beaumont–Banning line	96.13	154.71	96	Highland Springs Avenue	
Riverside	Banning	98.15	157.96	98	Sunset Avenue	
Riverside	Banning	98.78	158.97	99	22nd Street – Downtown Banning	
Riverside	Banning	99.67	160.40	100	SR 243 south (8th Street) – Idyllwild	
Riverside	Banning	100.68	162.03	101	Hargrave Street – Idyllwild	
Riverside	Banning	101.58	163.48	102	Ramsey Street	Westbound exit and eastbound entrance; former US 60 west / US 99 north
Riverside	Banning	102.35	164.72	Weigh station		
Riverside	Banning–Cabazon line	103.36	166.34	103	Malki Road	Formerly Fields Road
Riverside	Cabazon	104.48	168.14	104	Morongo Trail – Cabazon	Former US 99 south; formerly Apache Trail
Riverside	Cabazon	106.22	170.94	106	Main Street – Cabazon	Former US 99 north
Riverside		111.37	179.23	110	Haugen–Lehmann Way	Formerly Verbena Avenue; formerly exit 111
Riverside	Palm Springs	112.02	180.28	111	SR 111 south – Palm Springs	Eastbound exit and westbound entrance; formerly exit 112
Riverside	Palm Springs	113.07	181.97	Whitewater Rest Area		
Riverside	Palm Springs	114.05	183.55	114	Whitewater (Tipton Road, Whitewater Cutoff)	
Riverside		116.51	187.50	117	SR 62 east – Twentynine Palms, Yucca Valley	Signed as "29 Palms"
Riverside	Palm Springs–Desert Hot Springs line	119.95	193.04	120	Indian Canyon Drive – North Palm Springs	Formerly Indian Avenue
Riverside	Palm Springs–Desert Hot Springs line	122.96	197.88	123	Gene Autry Trail, Palm Drive – Desert Hot Springs	
Riverside	Cathedral City	126.31	203.28	126	Date Palm Drive	
Riverside	Cathedral City	130.18	209.50	130	Bob Hope Drive, Ramon Road – Palm Springs	
Riverside	Palm Desert	131.33	211.36	131	Monterey Avenue – Thousand Palms	
Riverside	Palm Desert			133	Portola Avenue	Proposed interchange
Riverside	Palm Desert	133.71	215.19	134	Cook Street	
Riverside	Palm Desert	137.27	220.91	137	Washington Street – Bermuda Dunes	
Riverside	Indio	139.16	223.96	139	Indio Boulevard, Jefferson Street	Indio Boulevard is former US 99 south / SR 86 south
Riverside	Indio	141.56	227.82	142	Monroe Street – Central Indio	
Riverside	Indio	142.56	229.43	143	Jackson Street	
Riverside	Indio	143.77	231.38	144	Golf Center Parkway to SR 111	
Riverside	Indio	144.65	232.79	145	SR 86 south (Expressway) – Brawley, El Centro	Eastbound exit and westbound entrance; former SR 86S
Riverside	Coachella	145.71	234.50	146	Dillon Road to SR 86 south (Expressway) – Coachella	"To SR 86" not signed eastbound
Riverside	Coachella			151	Avenue 50	Proposed interchange
Riverside		158.82	255.60	Cactus City Rest Area		
Riverside		161.94	260.62	162	Frontage Road	access to Southern California Gas Company infrastructure
Riverside		168.37	270.97	168	Cottonwood Springs Road – Mecca, Twentynine Palms	Former SR 195
Riverside		172.89	278.24	173	Summit Road – Chiriaco Summit	
Riverside		176.94	284.76	177	Hayfield Road	access to Metropolitan Water District of Southern California and Southern California Edison facilities
Riverside		181.87	292.69	182	Red Cloud Road	access to Southern California Edison infrastructure
Riverside		188.83	303.89	189	Eagle Mountain Road	
Riverside	Desert Center	191.92	308.87	192	SR 177 north (Rice Road) – Desert Center	
Riverside		201.22	323.83	201	Corn Springs Road	
Riverside		216.76	348.84	217	Ford Dry Lake Road	
Riverside		221.87	357.07	222	Wiley's Well Road	access to Ironwood State Prison and Chuckwalla National Monument
Riverside		229.44	369.25	Weigh station (westbound only)		
Riverside		231.94	373.27	232	Mesa Drive – Blythe Airport, Mesa Verde	Former US 60 east
Riverside	Blythe	235.97	379.76	236	SR 78 west (Neighbours Boulevard south) / I-10 BL east (Neighbours Boulevard north) – Brawley	
Riverside	Blythe	238.97	384.58	239	Lovekin Boulevard	
Riverside	Blythe	239.98	386.21	240	7th Street	
Riverside	Blythe	240.99	387.84	241	US 95 north (Intake Boulevard) – Needles, Fairgrounds	Western end of US 95 overlap
Riverside	Blythe			242	E. Hobson Way (I-10 BL)	Westbound exit and entrance
Riverside	Blythe	242.92	390.94	243	Riviera Drive / I-10 BL west	Eastbound exit and entrance; westbound exit and entrance replaced by exit 242; I-10 Bus. is former US 60 west
Riverside	Blythe	242.92	390.94	Agricultural Inspection Station (westbound only)		
Colorado River		243.31	391.57	California–Arizona line		
Colorado River		243.31	391.57		I-10 east / US 95 south – Phoenix, Yuma	Continuation into Ehrenberg, Arizona
1.000 mi = 1.609 km; 1.000 km = 0.621 mi: Concurrency terminus; Electronic toll collection; Incomplete access; Route transition

== Spur to US 101 ==
Interstate 10 Spur to US 101
- Location: Los Angeles
- Length: 1.0 mi (1.6 km)
- Existed: 1968–present

Interstate 110
- Existed: 1958–1968

The legislative definition of Route 10 includes a spur from I-5 (the Golden State Freeway) west to US 101 (the Santa Ana Freeway) near downtown Los Angeles. This section of roadway, the westernmost part of the San Bernardino Freeway, was in fact part of the original San Bernardino Freeway, carrying US 60/US 70/US 99 long before the Golden State Freeway opened. It was added to the Interstate Highway System by 1958 as I-110, but in 1968 it was removed from the system, becoming a Route 10 spur.

This road is signed only for the roads it feeds into: US 101 northbound and I-10 eastbound. It has only two interchanges between its ends: a westbound exit off the spur at Mission Road immediately before merging with US 101 northbound, and the eastbound exit for State Street and Soto Street before it merges onto I-10 eastbound—this one is numbered (as exit 19). There is no direct access from the I-10 spur to I-5.

Exit list
The entire route is in Los Angeles, Los Angeles County.

mi	km	Exit	Destinations	Notes
0.0	0.0	—	US 101 north (Santa Ana Freeway)	Western terminus of San Bernardino Freeway; no access to US 101 south; US 101 exit 1D
0.1	0.16	—	Mission Road	Westbound exit and eastbound entrance; also includes access from Pleasant Avenue and northbound US 101 (via exit 1D) onto entrance ramp
0.6	0.97	19	State Street to Soto Street	Eastbound exit and westbound entrance
1.0	1.6	—	I-10 east (San Bernardino Freeway east)	No access to I-10 west; freeway continues as I-10 east
1.000 mi = 1.609 km; 1.000 km = 0.621 mi: Incomplete access; Route transition

== Related routes ==
There are three auxiliary Interstate Highways associated with I-10 in California:

- The Harbor Freeway between SR 47 in the San Pedro district of Los Angeles and I-10 near Downtown Los Angeles is designated as I-110. The rest of the highway, running along the historic Arroyo Seco Parkway to Pasadena, is instead designated as SR 110.
- The Foothill Freeway between I-5 in the Sylmar district of Los Angeles and SR 57 in Glendora is designated as I-210. The rest of the Foothill Freeway, between SR 57 and I-10 in Redlands, is instead designated as SR 210.
- The Long Beach Freeway between SR 47 in Long Beach and I-10 in Monterey Park is designated as I-710. Due to community opposition, a northern extension through South Pasadena was never constructed; the segment that was completed in Pasadena between California Boulevard and I-210 instead has the unsigned designation of SR 710.

One business loop of I-10 exists in California, running through Blythe in Riverside County.

== See also ==
- Lloyd G. Davies, Los Angeles City Council member, 1943–1951, urged rail transportation on the Santa Monica Freeway

Interstate 10
Previous state: Terminus	California	Next state: Arizona
