= Feeder bluff =

Coastal cliff that provides sediment to down-current beaches

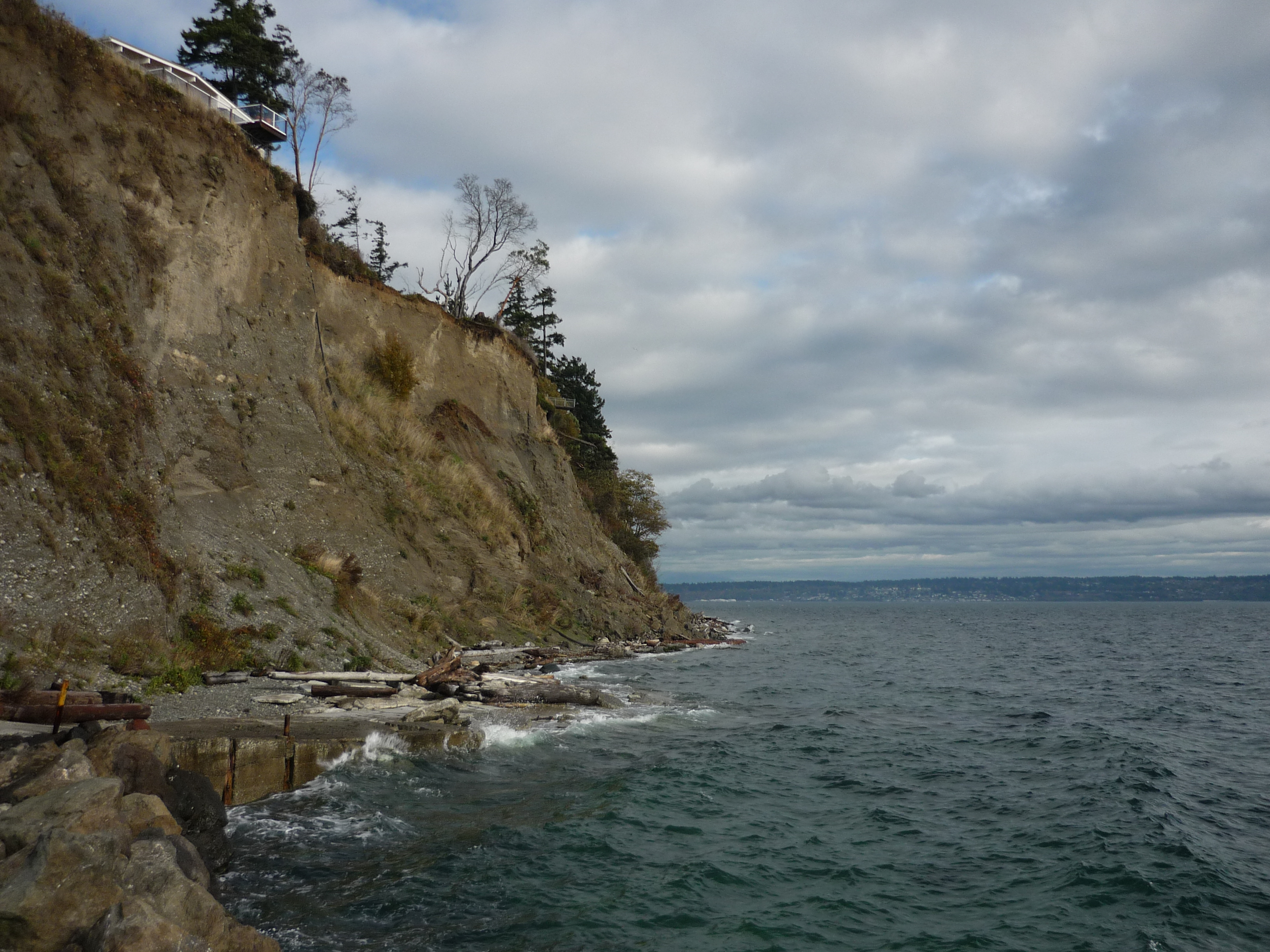
Feeder Bluff located at Jefferson Beach in Kingston, Washington

A Feeder bluff is a coastal cliff or headland that, through erosion and weathering, provides sediment to down-current beaches as a result of littoral drift. First discussed at Western Washington University, the term feeder bluff is primarily used to describe eroding bluffs in the Puget Sound region of the United States.

A bluff will be more susceptible to weathering and erosion if it contains unconsolidated sediment (such as silt or sand), softer (or more erodible) rock, fissures or fractures. Wave activity and power will also contribute to the rate of erosion. A bluff will retreat away from the ocean as the erosion processes continue.

Although coastal processes can be complex, feeder bluffs are recognized as an important source of sediment for building and maintaining nearby beaches. Practices of armoring beaches and bluffs against erosion have caused beaches and habitats to erode away due to the decreased availability of sand and gravel. One of the goals of the Puget Sound Nearshore Ecosystem Restoration Project is to reverse this process by identifying and removing bulkheads from beaches and bluffs. In 2013 the Washington State Department of Ecology completed mapping and categorization of feeder bluffs in the Puget Sound, finding they make up about 426 miles (17%) of the shoreline. The data has been made available at the Washington State Coast Atlas.
