= California State Route 99 =

State highway in California, United States

State Route 99
- SR 99 highlighted in red

Route information
- Maintained by Caltrans
- Length: 424.85 mi (683.73 km) (includes overlap with US 50 and I-5 in Sacramento)
- Existed: 1964–present
- History: 1926–1964 as US 99

Major junctions
- South end: I-5 near Wheeler Ridge
- SR 58 in Bakersfield; SR 41 in Fresno; SR 108 / SR 132 in Modesto; SR 120 in Manteca; SR 4 in Stockton; US 50 / I-80 BL in Sacramento; I-5 in Sacramento; SR 70 near Nicolaus; SR 20 in Yuba City; SR 32 in Chico
- North end: SR 36 near Red Bluff

Location
- Country: United States
- State: California
- Counties: Kern, Tulare, Fresno, Madera, Merced, Stanislaus, San Joaquin, Sacramento, Sutter, Butte, Tehama

Highway system
- State highways in California; Interstate; US; State; Scenic; History; Pre‑1964; Unconstructed; Deleted; Freeways
← US 99	→ SR 100

State Route 99 (SR 99) is a major north–south state highway in the U.S. state of California, stretching almost the entire length of the Central Valley. From its southern end at Interstate 5 (I-5) near Wheeler Ridge to its northern end at SR 36 near Red Bluff, SR 99 goes through the densely populated eastern parts of the valley. Cities served include Bakersfield, Delano, Tulare, Visalia, Fresno, Madera, Merced, Turlock, Modesto, Manteca, Stockton, Sacramento, Yuba City, and Chico.

The highway is a remnant of the former Mexico to Canada U.S. Route 99 (US 99), which was decommissioned in 1972 after being functionally replaced by I-5 for long-distance traffic. The entire segment from Wheeler Ridge to Sacramento has been upgraded as of January 2016 to a freeway at least four lanes wide, and the California Department of Transportation (Caltrans) plans to further upgrade the segment to a minimum width of six lanes and also bring it into compliance with Interstate Highway standards as a parallel route to I-5 for Los Angeles–Sacramento traffic. North of Sacramento, the road ranges from a rural two-lane road to a four-lane freeway, with much of it following the route formerly designated as US 99E.

A 2024 study conducted by a Dallas law firm looked at federal data over a five-year span between 2018 and 2022, concluding that SR 99 is the most dangerous highway in California, with 445 deaths (an average of 89 per year) over that five-year period.

== Route description ==
Route 99 is defined as having two segments as follows in section 399 of the California Streets and Highways Code:

Route 99 is from:
(a) Route 5 south of Bakersfield to Route 50 in Sacramento.
(b) Route 5 in Sacramento to Route 36 near Red Bluff, passing near Catlett and Tudor.

However, Caltrans lists SR 99 as having concurrencies with other highways through Sacramento.

SR 99 is part of the California Freeway and Expressway System, and except for a small portion north of SR 20 is part of the National Highway System, a network of highways that are considered essential to the country's economy, defense, and mobility by the Federal Highway Administration.

=== Wheeler Ridge to Sacramento ===
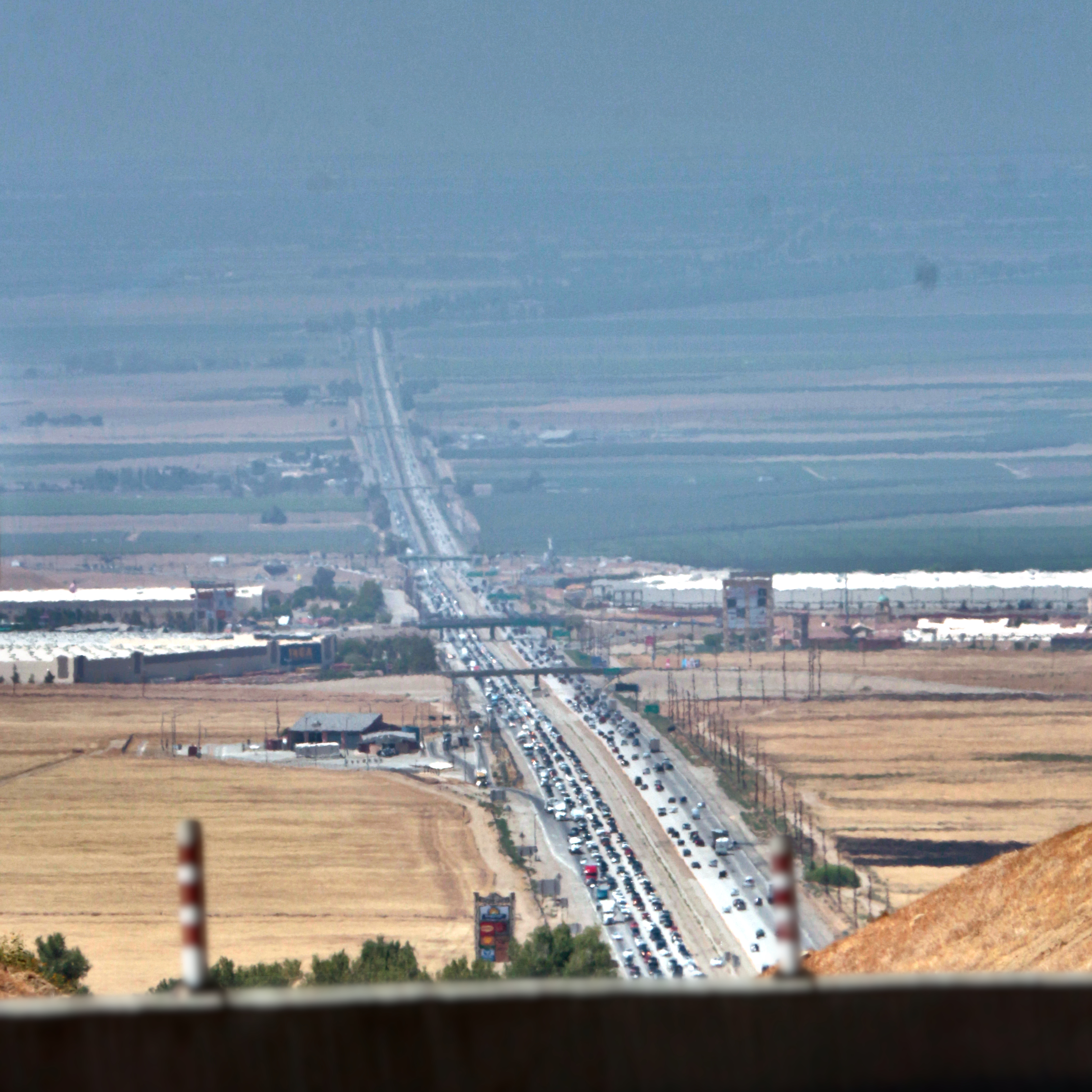
SR-99's southern terminus, and the Wheeler Ridge Interchange, viewed looking north from I-5 in the Tejon Pass.

From its southern terminus at I-5 in Wheeler Ridge (Wheeler Ridge Interchange) to Sacramento, SR 99 is designated as the Golden State Highway. It passes through the major cities of the San Joaquin Valley, including Bakersfield, Delano, Tulare, Visalia, Fresno, Madera, Merced, Modesto, and Stockton. The entirety of this segment is now built to freeway standards with complete access control, although some older portions are not yet in compliance with Interstate Highway standards. The freeway sections connect and serve the agriculture and industry of the California Central Valley, connecting agricultural production with processing and packing businesses. Most of the freeway also parallels the Union Pacific's Fresno Subdivision.

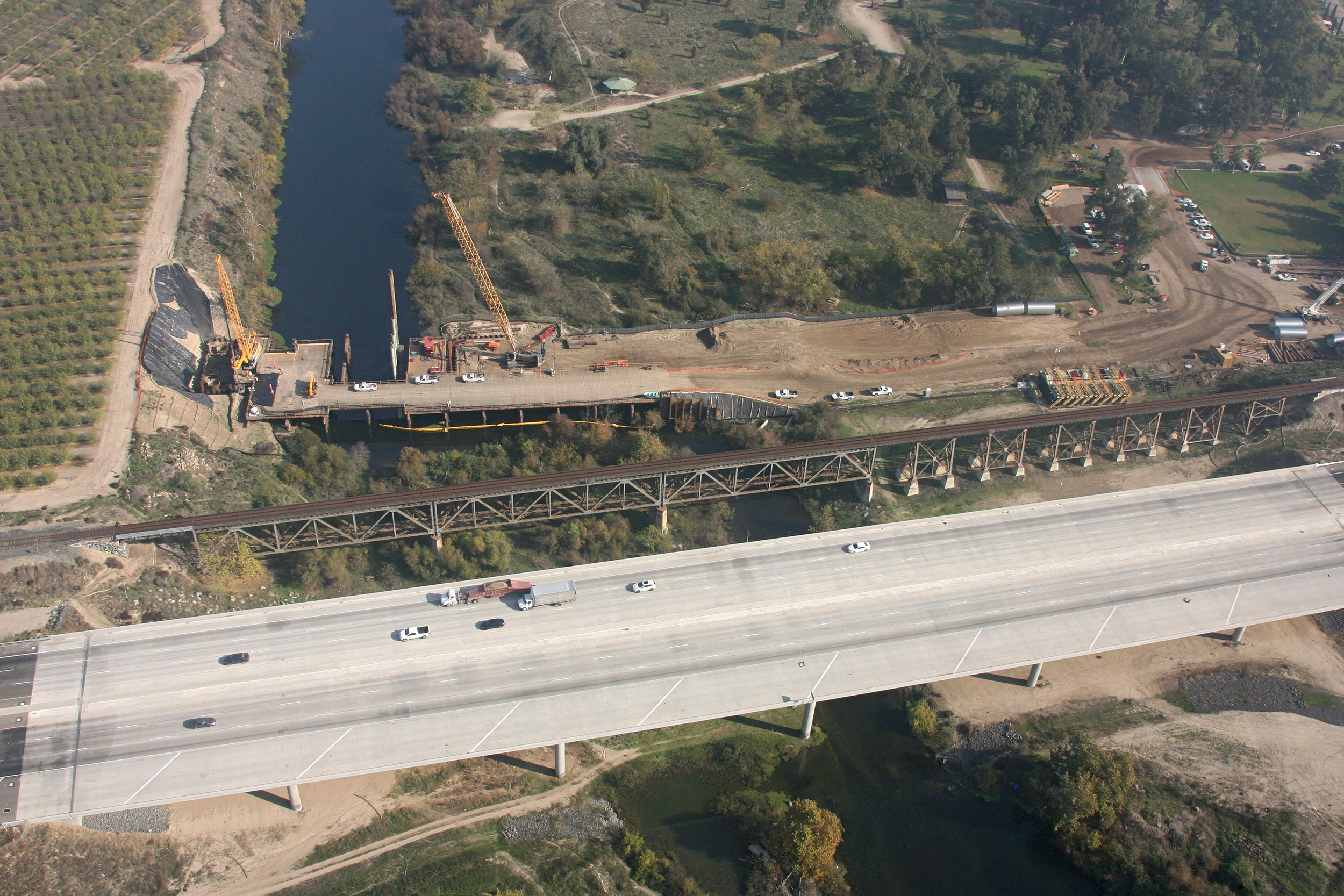
SR 99 crossing the San Joaquin River at the northern border of Fresno with the early stages of construction of California High-Speed Rail's San Joaquin River Viaduct, as well as the existing Union Pacific Railroad bridge, also visible

The portion of the highway between Fresno and Madera has also been designated the 100th Infantry Battalion Memorial Highway, honoring the U.S. Army unit that was composed almost entirely with American soldiers of Japanese ancestry when it fought during World War II. Approximately 10 miles (16 km) north of Fresno in this segment, a palm tree and a pine tree (replaced with a cedar after storm damage in 2005) were planted in the median to mark the transition between Southern California (the palm) and Northern California (the pine), reputedly in the 1920s. The trees are to be removed in 2025 as part of widening the segment to six lanes, to be replaced by 15 pines and 15 palms to the west of the highway.

The portion between Salida and Manteca is designated the 442nd Regimental Combat Team Memorial Highway, honoring the US Army infantry regiment that, like the 100th Infantry Battalion, was also composed almost entirely of American soldiers of Japanese ancestry during World War II.

In Sacramento, SR 99 joins with I-80 Business as part of the Capital City Freeway, then runs concurrently with I-5. Caltrans route logs for SR 99 do not recognize these concurrencies and lists the route as having two segments. And signage no longer exists at the two Sacramento interchanges to direct traffic from one segment to the other. However, Caltrans still recognizes these shared alignments on its exit lists.

=== North Sacramento to Red Bluff ===
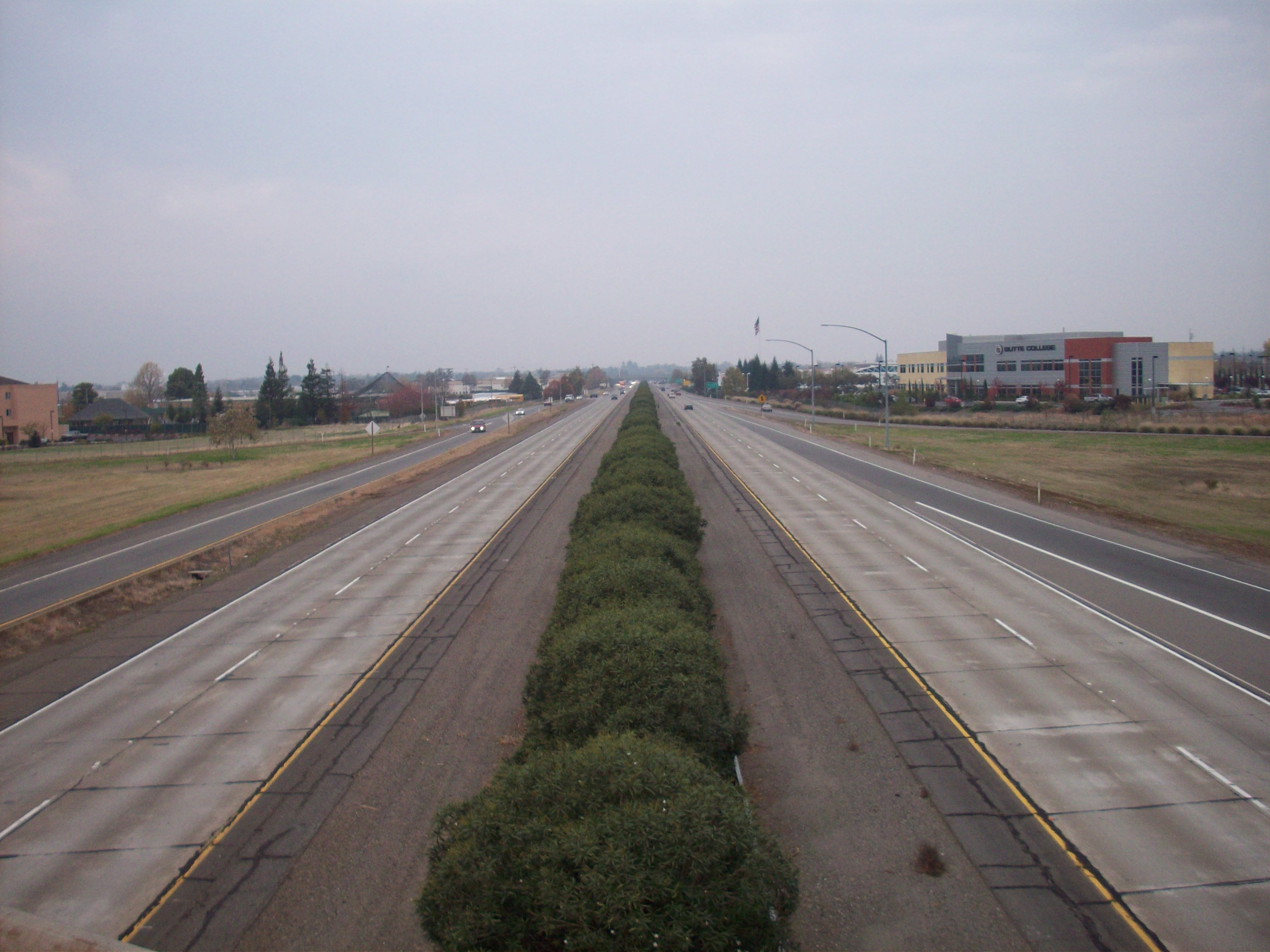
Facing north from Skyway on SR 99 in Chico with the Butte College, Chico Campus visible on the right

SR 99 then splits from I-5 in northern Sacramento, and then heads along the eastern side of the Sacramento Valley through Yuba City, and Chico to its northern terminus at SR 36 near Red Bluff. SR 99 remains a four-lane freeway as the route leaves Sacramento County, but shortly reverts to a four-lane divided expressway as the highway crosses into Sutter County. As SR 99 reaches the junction of SR 70, the route turns northwest by north and becomes an undivided expressway with the exceptions of crossing the Feather River near Nicolaus and the interchange with SR 113, where the route then turns straight north to Yuba City.

As SR 99 crosses SR 20 at a signaled intersection, the highway becomes a four-lane freeway for 3 miles (4.8 km) before reverting to a two-lane road, passing the smaller towns of Live Oak, Fagan, and Gridley. SR 99 briefly is a local four-lane road through Gridley before continuing as a two-lane highway. SR 99 passes by the western side of the Thermalito Afterbay. SR 162 joins SR 99 for 2 miles (3.2 km) before splitting off east towards the northern end of the Thermalito Afterbay. SR 99 then transitions from a two-lane road to a four-lane divided expressway just before the interchange at SR 149 turning northwest and eventually a freeway entering the Chico city limits. As SR 99 leaves Chico, the highway reverts to a 2-lane road before crossing into Tehama County and passing through rural areas and the town of Los Molinos. The route then curves to the west and terminates at the junction with SR 36, approximately 1.5 miles (2.4 km) from I-5 in Red Bluff.

== History ==
=== From initial construction to U.S. Route 99 ===
The first state highway bond issue, approved by the state's voters in 1910, included a north–south highway through the central part of the state consisting of Route 3 through the Sacramento Valley from the Oregon state line south to Sacramento, replacing the Siskiyou Trail, and Route 4 through the San Joaquin Valley from Sacramento to Los Angeles. In addition, a second route followed the west side of the Sacramento Valley, using Route 7 from Red Bluff south to Davis and the short Route 8 east along the proposed Yolo Causeway to Sacramento. North of Bakersfield these closely paralleled some of the main lines of the Southern Pacific Railroad, including the Fresno Line, East and West Valley lines, Shasta Line and Siskiyou Line.

By 1920 paving of both routes from Red Bluff to Los Angeles was completed or in progress, including the only mountain crossing south of Red Bluff, the Ridge Route just north of Los Angeles. To the north of Red Bluff, the road was being graded but had not yet been paved over the Siskiyou Mountains into Oregon. Paving was finally completed in mid-1933, when a new alignment (now SR 263) opened through the Shasta River Canyon.

The route from Davis to Oregon via Routes 7 and 3 came to be known as part of the Pacific Highway, an auto trail organized in 1910 to connect Canada and Mexico. The split in the Sacramento Valley was known as the East and West Side highways (the latter also carrying the Pacific Highway). South of Sacramento Route 4 was the Valley Route, but the San Joaquin Valley Tourist and Travel Association held a contest to rename it, selecting Golden State Highway as the winning entry in July 1927. To this day, "Golden State Highway" is SR 99's default name in areas not given other names by the Legislature, and the name continues from its end at Wheeler Ridge on I-5 as the Golden State Freeway from there to downtown Los Angeles.

This north–south central highway became part of US 99 in 1926, as part of the new United States Numbered Highway System developed by the American Association of State Highway Officials (AASHO), though signs were not posted in California until 1928. US 99 also continued southeast from Los Angeles along a paved state highway, Route 9 and 26, to US 80 in El Centro. The paved county road south from El Centro to the Mexican border became a state highway in mid-1931, and part of US 99 in mid-1932.

In mid-1929, AASHO approved a split designation between Sacramento and Red Bluff, with US 99W replacing the original western route via Davis, and US 99E following the East Side Highway (Route 3) via Roseville. A short-lived split also existed between Manteca and Stockton in the early 1930s, with US 99E becoming the main route and US 99W becoming an extended SR 120 where not concurrent with US 50.

A third highway heading north from Sacramento was constructed by the Natomas Company in the 1910s for 13 miles (21 km) along the Sacramento River levee to provide access to land reclaimed and sold by the company. Sacramento and Sutter counties continued the road alongside the Sacramento River and Feather River to Nicolaus, where an existing county road crossed the river on a drawbridge and ran north to the East Side Highway at Yuba City. This continuous roadway between Sacramento and Yuba City was dedicated in October 1924 as the Garden Highway.

Parts of the present SR 99 alignment between Sacramento and Yuba City were added to the state highway system in 1933, when the legislature added Route 87 (Sign Route 24, later US 40 Alternate) from Woodland north past Yuba City to northwest of Oroville, and in 1949, with the creation of Route 232 (later Sign Route 24) between Sacramento and Marysville. The final piece became Route 245 (no signed number) in 1959, connecting Route 232 near Catlett with Route 87 near Tudor, and following the old Garden Highway across the Feather River to a point east of Tudor. Despite this combined route connecting the same cities as the Garden Highway, the only other piece of the old county road taken for the state highway was a short segment just north of Sacramento, carrying Route 232 between Jibboom Street and El Centro Road.

=== As a state route ===
When the Interstate Highway System was being planned in the 1950s, there were two proposals as to which way to route a freeway through the San Joaquin Valley. One was to upgrade US 99 to Interstate standards. The other proposed alternative was the West Side Freeway, which would bypass all the Central Valley communities and thus provide a faster and more direct north–south route through the state. The latter route was eventually chosen and ultimately became Interstate 5.

The implementation of the Interstate Highway System and the mid-1964 state highway renumbering ultimately sealed the fate of the U.S. Highway designation on US 99. The Interstates eventually replaced portions of US 99, causing it to be truncated at both of its ends.

US 99 was truncated to Los Angeles, with the old route south to Mexico becoming mainly I-10 and SR 86. At the same time Route 99 was defined legislatively to run from I-5 near Wheeler Ridge to Red Bluff, but it was only marked as SR 99 between Sacramento and Yuba City, since the remainder was still US 99 or US 99E. The southern end of US 99 was moved further north to Sacramento in late 1966 and SR 99 was extended to Wheeler Ridge; the rest of former US 99 to Los Angeles was either I-5 or the locally maintained San Fernando Road. Several years later US 99 and its branches were removed altogether from California, making SR 99 signage match the legislative definition; all of US 99W, and US 99 north of Red Bluff, remained as other routes (I-80, SR 113, and I-5), while US 99E between Roseville and Marysville became SR 65. By 1968, all US 99 signs were removed or replaced with SR 99 signs following the completion of I-5.

During the 20th century, Caltrans gradually widened Route 99 into a four-lane expressway for the length of the entire segment from Wheeler Ridge to Sacramento. The agency did not immediately upgrade Route 99 to a freeway, since the West Side Freeway had already been selected as the preferred alternative for north–south long-distance traffic. As traffic levels along the Route 99 corridor continued to increase, the at-grade intersections on the expressway became extremely dangerous. Drivers on cross-streets who needed to cross the expressway often had to wait for many minutes at those intersections to find suitable gaps in which to dart across heavy through traffic on Route 99 moving at near-freeway speeds. If drivers became impatient or mistimed the speed of through traffic, the result was often a dangerous side collision. Therefore, Caltrans upgraded or replaced those intersections one-by-one with freeway interchanges, and often added frontage roads for access to adjacent parcels. This work proceeded very slowly over several decades, as Caltrans needed to balance the rising level of danger at the rural intersections on Route 99 with other urgent construction priorities in California's rapidly growing metropolitan areas.

By 2012, there was only one remaining expressway segment with at-grade intersections on Route 99 between Sacramento and Wheeler Ridge, in Merced County between the cities of Chowchilla and Atwater. On December 11, 2012, Caltrans commenced construction on a project to upgrade that segment to a six-lane freeway with full access control. On January 15, 2016, Caltrans officially opened the Plainsburg Road interchange, which completed the conversion of Route 99 south of Sacramento to a freeway built to near-interstate standards.

== Future ==
Future Interstate 7 or 9
- Location: Wheeler Ridge–Sacramento, California
- Length: 302 mi (486 km)

Caltrans' long-range plans have proposed upgrading SR 99 to Interstate Highway standards between its southern terminus at Wheeler Ridge and Sacramento, which would require improvements to several substandard sections. Caltrans has suggested that the route could be designated as either I-7 or I-9.

The proposed upgrades are outlined in the Caltrans Route 99 Corridor Enhancement Master Plan, which proposed two routing options. Under the first proposal, the route would run from the Wheeler Ridge Interchange north through Bakersfield and Fresno to Stockton, then west along SR 4 to I-5 in central Stockton. Under the second proposal, the route would continue north from Stockton along SR 99 to Sacramento, then west along the Capital City Freeway to I-5 at the I-5/US 50 interchange. The Sacramento proposal would also connect the existing northern segment of SR 99 with the Interstate Highway System.

In August 2005, the federal SAFETEA-LU law designated SR 99 from Wheeler Ridge through Stockton and Sacramento as High Priority Corridor 54, the California Farm-to-Market Corridor. The legislation also designated the corridor as a future segment of the Interstate Highway System.

== Major intersections ==
Except where prefixed with a letter, postmiles were measured on the road as it was in 1964, based on the alignment that existed at the time, and do not necessarily reflect current mileage. Postmile prefixes include: R reflecting a realignment in the route since then, M indicating a second realignment, L referring to an overlap due to a correction or change, and T indicating postmiles classified as temporary. Segments that remain unconstructed or have been relinquished to local control may be omitted. The numbers reset at county lines; the start and end postmiles in each county are given in the county column.

County	Location	Postmile	Exit	Destinations	Notes
Kern; KER L0.75–57.58		L0.75	—	I-5 south – Los Angeles	Southern terminus of SR 99; no access to I-5 north; Wheeler Ridge Interchange; former US 99 south; I-5 north exit 221
Kern; KER L0.75–57.58		L0.75	—	I-5 Truck south	Southbound exit only; truck lanes to I-5 south
Kern; KER L0.75–57.58	Mettler	2.73	3	SR 166 west – Maricopa, Santa Maria	Eastern terminus of SR 166
Kern; KER L0.75–57.58	Mettler	4.02	4	Mettler (Mettler Frontage Road West)	Southbound exit and entrance
Kern; KER L0.75–57.58		5.34	5	David Road, Copus Road	
Kern; KER L0.75–57.58		7.29	7	Sandrini Road	
Kern; KER L0.75–57.58		9.30	9	Herring Road	
Kern; KER L0.75–57.58		10.93	11	Union Avenue (SR 99 Bus. north) – Greenfield	Northbound exit and southbound entrance; former US 99 north
Kern; KER L0.75–57.58		13.41	13	SR 223 (Bear Mountain Boulevard) – Arvin	
Kern; KER L0.75–57.58		15.43	15	Houghton Road	
Kern; KER L0.75–57.58	Bakersfield	17.50	18	SR 119 west (Taft Highway) – Taft, Lamont	Former US 399; eastern terminus of SR 119
Kern; KER L0.75–57.58	Bakersfield	18.52	19	Hosking Avenue	
Kern; KER L0.75–57.58	Bakersfield	19.54	20	Panama Lane	
Kern; KER L0.75–57.58	Bakersfield	21.08	21	White Lane	
Kern; KER L0.75–57.58	Bakersfield	22.60	23	Ming Avenue	
Kern; KER L0.75–57.58	Bakersfield		24A	SR 58 west (Westside Parkway)	Northbound exit and southbound entrance
Kern; KER L0.75–57.58	Bakersfield	23.51– 23.62	24B	SR 58 east – Tehachapi, Mojave	West Bakersfield Interchange; signed as exit 24 southbound; southbound exit provides access to Stockdale Highway and Brundage Lane
Kern; KER L0.75–57.58	Bakersfield	24.60	25	California Avenue – Civic Center	
Kern; KER L0.75–57.58	Bakersfield	25.65	26A	To SR 178 east (24th Street) / Rosedale Highway / SR 58 west – Lake Isabella, Buttonwillow	Signed as exit 26 southbound; northbound entrance is via Buck Owens Boulevard; former SR 58 west
Kern; KER L0.75–57.58	Bakersfield	25.90	26B	Buck Owens Boulevard	Northbound exit and entrance
Kern; KER L0.75–57.58	Bakersfield	26.78	27	Airport Drive – Oildale	Northbound exit and southbound entrance; serves Meadows Field Airport
Kern; KER L0.75–57.58	Bakersfield	27.05	27	SR 204 south (Golden State Avenue / SR 99 Bus. south) to SR 178 east	Southbound exit and northbound entrance; northern terminus of SR 204; former US 99 south / US 466 east
Kern; KER L0.75–57.58	Bakersfield	27.87	28	Olive Drive	
Kern; KER L0.75–57.58	Bakersfield	R28.56	29	Norris Road – Oildale	Southbound exit and northbound entrance
Kern; KER L0.75–57.58	Bakersfield	R29.88	30	SR 65 north – Porterville, Sequoia National Park	Northbound exit and southbound entrance; southern terminus of SR 65
Kern; KER L0.75–57.58	Bakersfield	R30.53	31	7th Standard Road, Merle Haggard Drive	
Kern; KER L0.75–57.58	Shafter	36.52	37	Lerdo Highway	
Kern; KER L0.75–57.58	Shafter	R39.12	39	Merced Avenue	
Kern; KER L0.75–57.58		R41.16	41	Kimberlina Road	
Kern; KER L0.75–57.58	Famoso	44.31	44	SR 46 west (Paso Robles Highway) – Wasco, Paso Robles	Former US 466 west; eastern terminus of SR 46
Kern; KER L0.75–57.58	McFarland	R47.37	47	Whisler Road	
Kern; KER L0.75–57.58	McFarland	49.30	49	Sherwood Avenue	No northbound entrance
Kern; KER L0.75–57.58	McFarland	49.95– 50.41	50	Perkins Avenue, Elmo Highway	
Kern; KER L0.75–57.58	Delano	52.45	52	Pond Road	
Kern; KER L0.75–57.58	Delano	54.48	54	Woollomes Avenue (SR 99 Bus. north)	
Kern; KER L0.75–57.58	Delano	55.52	55	First Avenue	Northbound exit and southbound entrance
Kern; KER L0.75–57.58	Delano	55.52	56A	SR 155 east – Glennville, Wofford Heights	Signed as exit 56 northbound; western terminus of SR 155
Kern; KER L0.75–57.58	Delano	56.10	56B	Central Delano (11th Avenue)	Northbound exit is via exit 56
Kern; KER L0.75–57.58	Delano	56.54	57	Cecil Avenue	Southbound entrance is via exit 56B
Kern–Tulare county line	Delano	57.58	58	County Line Road (SR 99 Bus. south / CR J44)	
Tulare; TUL 0.00-R53.94		2.02	60	Avenue 16	Southbound exit and entrance
Tulare; TUL 0.00-R53.94		3.06	61	Avenue 24	No southbound entrance
Tulare; TUL 0.00-R53.94	Earlimart	6.15	64	Avenue 48 – Earlimart	
Tulare; TUL 0.00-R53.94	Earlimart	7.17	65A	Avenue 56 (CR J22) – Ducor, Alpaugh	Signed as exit 65 northbound; former Legislative Route 135
Tulare; TUL 0.00-R53.94	Earlimart	7.24	65B	Alpaugh (Front Street)	Southbound exit only; former US 99 south
Tulare; TUL 0.00-R53.94		9.71	67	Avenue 72, Avenue 76	Avenue 76 not signed southbound; northbound entrance is via exit 68
Tulare; TUL 0.00-R53.94		10.20	68	Avenue 80, Avenue 76	Southbound exit and northbound entrance
Tulare; TUL 0.00-R53.94	Pixley	12.30	70A	Avenue 96 (CR J24) – Pixley, Terra Bella	
Tulare; TUL 0.00-R53.94	Pixley	12.80	70B	Court Street	No southbound entrance; northbound entrance is via exit 71
Tulare; TUL 0.00-R53.94	Pixley	12.90	70C	Pixley (Main Street)	Southbound exit only; former US 99 south
Tulare; TUL 0.00-R53.94	Pixley	13.33	71	Road 124	Northbound exit and entrance
Tulare; TUL 0.00-R53.94	Pixley	15.37	73	Avenue 120	
Tulare; TUL 0.00-R53.94	Tipton	18.43	76	SR 190 east – Tipton, Porterville, Springville	Western terminus of SR 190
Tulare; TUL 0.00-R53.94	Tipton	19.46	77	Avenue 152 (CR J26) – Tipton	
Tulare; TUL 0.00-R53.94		22.30	Raine Rest Area		
Tulare; TUL 0.00-R53.94	Tulare	23.49	81	Avenue 184	
Tulare; TUL 0.00-R53.94	Tulare	25.43	83	Avenue 200 (SR 99 Bus. north)	
Tulare; TUL 0.00-R53.94	Tulare	26.05	—	K Street (SR 99 Bus. north)	Closed in 2005; former northbound left exit and southbound entrance
Tulare; TUL 0.00-R53.94	Tulare	26.71	84	International Agri-Center Way	Opened in 2026
Tulare; TUL 0.00-R53.94	Tulare	27.60	85	Paige Avenue	Interchange planned to undergo reconstruction between 2027 and 2029.
Tulare; TUL 0.00-R53.94	Tulare	28.61	86	Bardsley Avenue	
Tulare; TUL 0.00-R53.94	Tulare	29.57	87	SR 137 (Tulare Avenue)	
Tulare; TUL 0.00-R53.94	Tulare	30.58	88	Prosperity Avenue, Hillman Street, Blackstone Street	Blackstone Street not signed northbound; Hillman Street not signed southbound
Tulare; TUL 0.00-R53.94	Tulare	31.85	89	Cartmill Avenue	M Street was removed from southbound signage after interchange was reconstructed c. 2015
Tulare; TUL 0.00-R53.94			90	Oaks Street	Closed; former northbound exit and entrance
Tulare; TUL 0.00-R53.94		33.22	91	J Street (SR 99 Bus. south)	Southbound exit only; former US 99 south
Tulare; TUL 0.00-R53.94		33.94	92	Avenue 260, Avenue 264	
Tulare; TUL 0.00-R53.94	Visalia	36.41	94	Avenue 280, Caldwell Avenue (CR J30)	Interchange undergoing reconstruction between 2025 and 2027
Tulare; TUL 0.00-R53.94	Visalia	R38.75	97	SR 198 (Sequoia Freeway) – Visalia, Sequoia National Park, Hanford, Lemoore	Signed as exits 96 (east) and 97 (west) northbound; SR 198 exit 101
Tulare; TUL 0.00-R53.94	Goshen	39.93	98A	Avenue 304 – Goshen	
Tulare; TUL 0.00-R53.94	Goshen	40.79	98	Betty Drive (CR J32)	Formerly signed as exit 98B
Tulare; TUL 0.00-R53.94	Traver	48.20	106A	Traver (Drive 39)	Northbound exit only
Tulare; TUL 0.00-R53.94	Traver	48.71	106B	Merritt Drive (CR J36) – Traver	Signed as exit 106 southbound
Tulare; TUL 0.00-R53.94		51.81	109	Avenue 384 (CR J38) – Woodlake	Serves the Warlow Rest Area
Tulare–Fresno county line	Kingsburg	R53.82	111	Road 12, 18th Avenue	
Fresno; FRE R0.00–31.61	Kingsburg	R0.95	112	SR 201 east (Sierra Street) – Kingsburg	Western terminus of SR 201
Fresno; FRE R0.00–31.61	Kingsburg	R2.06	114	Bethel Avenue, Kamm Avenue	
Fresno; FRE R0.00–31.61	Selma	R3.74	115	Mountain View Avenue (SR 99 Bus. north / CR J40)	
Fresno; FRE R0.00–31.61	Selma	R5.32	117	Second Street	
Fresno; FRE R0.00–31.61	Selma	6.43	118	SR 43 south (Highland Avenue) / Floral Avenue (SR 99 Bus. south) – Hanford, Corcoran	Northern terminus of SR 43
Fresno; FRE R0.00–31.61	Fowler	9.16	121	Manning Avenue (SR 99 Bus. north)	
Fresno; FRE R0.00–31.61	Fowler	11.10	123A	Merced Street	Signed as exit 123 northbound
Fresno; FRE R0.00–31.61	Fowler	11.84	123B	Adams Avenue (SR 99 Bus. south)	Southbound exit and northbound entrance
Fresno; FRE R0.00–31.61		12.40	124	Clovis Avenue	
Fresno; FRE R0.00–31.61		14.51	126	American Avenue	Southbound exit and northbound entrance
Fresno; FRE R0.00–31.61	Fresno	15.49– 15.86	127	Central Avenue, Chestnut Avenue	
Fresno; FRE R0.00–31.61	Fresno	16.93– 17.26	128	Cedar Avenue, North Avenue	Signed as exit 129 southbound
Fresno; FRE R0.00–31.61	Fresno	18.54	130	Jensen Avenue to SR 41 south	Former SR 41 south
Fresno; FRE R0.00–31.61	Fresno	19.29	131	SR 41 north (Yosemite Freeway) – Yosemite	Northbound exit and southbound entrance; SR 41 south exit 126A
Fresno; FRE R0.00–31.61	Fresno	19.29	131	SR 41 south (Yosemite Freeway) – Lemoore, Paso Robles	Northbound exit is via exit 130; SR 41 north exit 126A
Fresno; FRE R0.00–31.61	Fresno	20.19	132A	Ventura Street, Kings Canyon Road	Former SR 180 east, earlier SR 41
Fresno; FRE R0.00–31.61	Fresno	20.74	132B	Fresno Street – Civic Center	
Fresno; FRE R0.00–31.61	Fresno	21.01	133A	Stanislaus Street	Southbound exit and northbound entrance; former SR 180 west, earlier both directions
Fresno; FRE R0.00–31.61	Fresno	22.16	133	SR 180 (Sequoia-Kings Canyon Freeway) – Mendota, Kings Canyon	Signed as exit 133B southbound; SR 180 exit 57A
Fresno; FRE R0.00–31.61	Fresno	22.74	134	Belmont Avenue – Pine Flat Dam	Interchange scheduled to be permanently closed in 2026
Fresno; FRE R0.00–31.61	Fresno	23.30	135A	Olive Avenue	Signed as exit 135 southbound
Fresno; FRE R0.00–31.61	Fresno	23.85	135B	McKinley Avenue	Northbound exit and southbound entrance; interchange scheduled to be permanently closed in 2026
Fresno; FRE R0.00–31.61	Fresno	24.42	136A	Golden State Boulevard	Southbound exit only; former US 99 south
Fresno; FRE R0.00–31.61	Fresno	24.75	136B	Clinton Avenue	Signed as exit 136 northbound
Fresno; FRE R0.00–31.61	Fresno	26.22	138A	North Golden State Boulevard	Northbound exit and southbound entrance; former US 99 north
Fresno; FRE R0.00–31.61	Fresno	26.55	138B	Ashlan Avenue	Signed as exit 138 southbound
Fresno; FRE R0.00–31.61	Fresno	28.10	140	Shaw Avenue	
Fresno; FRE R0.00–31.61	Fresno		141	Veterans Boulevard	
Fresno; FRE R0.00–31.61	Fresno	30.48	142	Herndon Avenue, Grantland Avenue	Northbound exit and southbound entrance
Fresno; FRE R0.00–31.61	Fresno	30.99	143	Herndon Avenue (Golden State Boulevard)	Southbound exit and northbound entrance; former US 99 south
San Joaquin River		31.61 0.00	San Joaquin River Bridge		
Madera; MAD 0.00–29.36		R0.99	144	Avenue 7, Road 33	
Madera; MAD 0.00–29.36		R3.56	147	Avenue 9, Road 30½, Road 31½	
Madera; MAD 0.00–29.36		R7.46	151	Avenue 12, Road 29	
Madera; MAD 0.00–29.36	Madera	9.36	152	Almond Avenue	Southbound exit and entrance
Madera; MAD 0.00–29.36	Madera	9.49	153A	Gateway Drive (SR 99 Bus. north)	Northbound exit and southbound entrance; former US 99 north
Madera; MAD 0.00–29.36	Madera	10.27	153B	SR 145 (Madera Avenue) – Kerman, Firebaugh, Yosemite	Signed as exit 153 southbound
Madera; MAD 0.00–29.36	Madera	11.01	154	Fourth Street – Central Madera	
Madera; MAD 0.00–29.36	Madera	12.13	155	Cleveland Avenue – Millerton Lake, Yosemite	
Madera; MAD 0.00–29.36	Madera	12.75	156	Avenue 16, Kennedy Street, Gateway Drive (SR 99 Bus. south)	Gateway Drive is former US 99 south
Madera; MAD 0.00–29.36	Madera	R14.22	157	Avenue 17	
Madera; MAD 0.00–29.36		R16.33	159	Avenue 18½, Road 23	
Madera; MAD 0.00–29.36		R18.68	162	Avenue 20, Avenue 20½	
Madera; MAD 0.00–29.36	Fairmead	20.87	164	Road 20, Avenue 21½	
Madera; MAD 0.00–29.36	Fairmead	22.73	166	SR 152 west – Los Banos, Gilroy	Northbound left exit; no northbound entrance; eastern terminus of SR 152
Madera; MAD 0.00–29.36	Chowchilla	23.77	167	Avenue 24	
Madera; MAD 0.00–29.36	Chowchilla	24.43	168	Avenue 24½	No access across SR 99
Madera; MAD 0.00–29.36	Chowchilla	26.58	170	SR 233 (Robertson Boulevard) to SR 152 west / Avenue 26 – Chowchilla	Northern terminus of SR 233
Madera; MAD 0.00–29.36		28.17	171	Road 15 – Le Grand	
Madera; MAD 0.00–29.36		29.33	Bridge over the Chowchilla River		
Merced; MER 0.00-R37.30		0.60	Weigh station (northbound only)		
Merced; MER 0.00-R37.30		3.40	176	Plainsburg Road, Sandy Mush Road	
Merced; MER 0.00-R37.30		6.72	179	Le Grand Road – Le Grand	
Merced; MER 0.00-R37.30	Merced	R11.71	185	Mission Avenue, Campus Parkway	
Merced; MER 0.00-R37.30	Merced	13.09	186A	Childs Avenue, Motel Drive	
Merced; MER 0.00-R37.30	Merced	13.86	186B	SR 140 east – Mariposa, Yosemite	Southern end of SR 140 overlap
Merced; MER 0.00-R37.30	Merced	14.08	186C	16th Street (SR 99 Bus. north)	Northbound exit and southbound entrance
Merced; MER 0.00-R37.30	Merced	14.41	187A	G Street	Northbound exit and southbound entrance
Merced; MER 0.00-R37.30	Merced	14.69	187B	SR 59 south (Martin Luther King Jr. Way) – Downtown Merced, Los Banos	Southern end of SR 59 overlap, signed as exit 187 southbound
Merced; MER 0.00-R37.30	Merced	15.80	188	SR 59 north (V Street) / SR 140 west / R Street	Northern end of SR 59 / SR 140 overlap
Merced; MER 0.00-R37.30	Merced	16.54	189	16th Street (SR 99 Bus. south)	No northbound exit
Merced; MER 0.00-R37.30		18.51	191	Franklin Road	Northbound exit and entrance
Merced; MER 0.00-R37.30	Atwater	20.52	193	Atwater-Merced Expressway	
Merced; MER 0.00-R37.30	Atwater	21.61	194	Atwater Boulevard (SR 99 Bus. north)	Northbound exit and southbound entrance
Merced; MER 0.00-R37.30	Atwater	22.76	195	Applegate Road – Winton	
Merced; MER 0.00-R37.30	Atwater	23.46	196	Atwater Boulevard (SR 99 Bus. south)	Southbound exit and northbound entrance
Merced; MER 0.00-R37.30		25.03	198	Bellevue Road, Westside Boulevard (CR J18)	
Merced; MER 0.00-R37.30		27.13	200	Liberty Avenue, Sultana Drive	
Merced; MER 0.00-R37.30	Livingston	R29.00	201	Hammatt Avenue	
Merced; MER 0.00-R37.30	Livingston	R30.38	203	Winton Parkway	
Merced; MER 0.00-R37.30		R31.93	204	Collier Road	
Merced; MER 0.00-R37.30	Delhi	33.53	206	South Avenue	
Merced; MER 0.00-R37.30	Delhi	R34.43	207	Shanks Road – Delhi	
Merced; MER 0.00-R37.30		35.55	208	Bradbury Road	
Merced; MER 0.00-R37.30		R36.34	209	Golden State Boulevard (SR 99 Bus. north)	Northbound exit and southbound entrance
Stanislaus; STA R0.00-R24.75		R0.50	Christoffersen Rest Area		
Stanislaus; STA R0.00-R24.75	Turlock	R1.63	211	SR 165 (Lander Avenue, CR J14) – Central Turlock, Los Banos	Northern terminus of SR 165
Stanislaus; STA R0.00-R24.75	Turlock	R3.45	213	West Main Street (CR J17) – Patterson, Central Turlock	
Stanislaus; STA R0.00-R24.75	Turlock	R4.54	214	Fulkerth Road	
Stanislaus; STA R0.00-R24.75	Turlock	R5.64	215	Monte Vista Avenue – Denair	
Stanislaus; STA R0.00-R24.75	Turlock	R6.75	217	Taylor Road (SR 99 Bus. south)	
Stanislaus; STA R0.00-R24.75	Keyes	R7.81	218	Keyes Road (CR J16) – Keyes	
Stanislaus; STA R0.00-R24.75	Ceres	R10.04	220	Mitchell Road	
Stanislaus; STA R0.00-R24.75	Ceres	11.30	221	Fourth Street	No southbound exit
Stanislaus; STA R0.00-R24.75	Ceres	R11.91	222	Whitmore Avenue – Hughson	
Stanislaus; STA R0.00-R24.75	Ceres	R13.26	223	Hatch Road	Signed as exits 223A (east) and 223B (west) northbound
Stanislaus; STA R0.00-R24.75	Modesto	R13.90	224	South 9th Street (SR 99 Bus. north)	Southbound exit is part of exit 223; former US 99 north
Stanislaus; STA R0.00-R24.75	Modesto	R14.47	225A	Crows Landing Road	
Stanislaus; STA R0.00-R24.75	Modesto	R15.10	225B	Tuolumne Boulevard, B Street	
Stanislaus; STA R0.00-R24.75	Modesto	R15.75	226A	Central Modesto (G Street, H Street, I Street)	Signed as exit 226 northbound
Stanislaus; STA R0.00-R24.75	Modesto	R16.12	226B	SR 108 / SR 132 east / Maze Boulevard	Northbound exit is via exit 226; western terminus of SR 108
Stanislaus; STA R0.00-R24.75	Modesto	R16.83	227	SR 132 west / Kansas Avenue – Vernalis	
Stanislaus; STA R0.00-R24.75	Modesto	M18.52	229	Carpenter Road (SR 99 Bus. south) / Briggsmore Avenue	
Stanislaus; STA R0.00-R24.75	Modesto	R20.22	230	Beckwith Road, Standiford Avenue	
Stanislaus; STA R0.00-R24.75	Modesto	R21.74	232	Pelandale Avenue	
Stanislaus; STA R0.00-R24.75	Salida	R22.56	233	SR 219 (Kiernan Avenue) / Broadway – Salida, Riverbank	
Stanislaus; STA R0.00-R24.75	Salida	R24.27	234	Hammett Road	
Stanislaus River		R24.75 0.00	Stanislaus River Bridge		
San Joaquin; SJ 0.00–38.78	Ripon	0.89	236	Main Street	
San Joaquin; SJ 0.00–38.78	Ripon	1.71	237A	Milgeo Avenue	Northbound exit and entrance
San Joaquin; SJ 0.00–38.78	Ripon	2.37	237B	Jack Tone Road (CR J5)	Signed as exit 237 southbound
San Joaquin; SJ 0.00–38.78	Manteca	4.89	240	Austin Road	Northbound exit and southbound entrance; southbound exit and northbound entrance permanently closed in 2026; overpass demolished to allow for reconstruction
San Joaquin; SJ 0.00–38.78	Manteca		—	Moffat Boulevard	Closed; former northbound left exit
San Joaquin; SJ 0.00–38.78	Manteca	5.82	241	SR 120 west to I-5 – Manteca, San Francisco	Southern end of SR 120 overlap; SR 120 east exit 6
San Joaquin; SJ 0.00–38.78	Manteca	6.65	242	SR 120 east (Yosemite Avenue) – Sonora	Northern end of SR 120 overlap
San Joaquin; SJ 0.00–38.78	Manteca	8.83	244A	Manteca (N. Main Street)	Closed; former southbound exit and northbound entrance
San Joaquin; SJ 0.00–38.78	Manteca	9.18	244B	Lathrop Road, N. Main Street	
San Joaquin; SJ 0.00–38.78	Manteca	11.47	246	French Camp Road (CR J9)	
San Joaquin; SJ 0.00–38.78		13.03	248	Frontage Road	Closed
San Joaquin; SJ 0.00–38.78	Stockton	14.61	250	Arch Road – Stockton Metropolitan Airport	Single-point urban interchange
San Joaquin; SJ 0.00–38.78	Stockton	15.68	251	Clark Drive	Closed; former northbound exit and entrance
San Joaquin; SJ 0.00–38.78	Stockton	16.70	252A	Mariposa Road (SR 99 Bus. north / SR 4 Bus. west / CR J7)	Former US 99 north
San Joaquin; SJ 0.00–38.78	Stockton	17.22	252B	SR 4 east (Golden Gate Avenue) – Angels Camp	Southern end of SR 4 overlap; replaced exit located at Farmington Road
San Joaquin; SJ 0.00–38.78	Stockton	18.02	253	Main Street	Northbound signage; closed
San Joaquin; SJ 0.00–38.78	Stockton	18.02	253	Dr. Martin Luther King Jr. Boulevard	Southbound signage; closed; former SR 26 west; formerly signed as Charter Way; now accessible via exit 252B
San Joaquin; SJ 0.00–38.78	Stockton	18.68	254A	SR 4 west to I-5 – Downtown Stockton, San Francisco	Northern end of SR 4 overlap; SR 4 east exit 68B
San Joaquin; SJ 0.00–38.78	Stockton	19.29	254B	SR 26 east (Fremont Street) – Linden	Western terminus of SR 26
San Joaquin; SJ 0.00–38.78	Stockton	20.34	255	SR 88 east (Waterloo Road) – Jackson	Western terminus of SR 88
San Joaquin; SJ 0.00–38.78	Stockton	20.88	256	Cherokee Road	
San Joaquin; SJ 0.00–38.78	Stockton	21.67	257A	Wilson Way (SR 99 Bus. south) – Central Stockton	Southbound exit and northbound left entrance; former US 50 west / US 99 south
San Joaquin; SJ 0.00–38.78	Stockton	21.91	257B	Frontage Road	Closed
San Joaquin; SJ 0.00–38.78	Stockton	22.92	258	Hammer Lane (CR J8)	
San Joaquin; SJ 0.00–38.78	Stockton	24.03	259	Morada Lane	
San Joaquin; SJ 0.00–38.78	Stockton	25.42	260	Eight Mile Road	
San Joaquin; SJ 0.00–38.78		27.50	262	Armstrong Road	
San Joaquin; SJ 0.00–38.78	Lodi	28.48	263	Harney Lane	
San Joaquin; SJ 0.00–38.78	Lodi	29.00	264A	Lodi (SR 99 Bus. north, Cherokee Lane)	Northbound exit and southbound entrance; former US 50 east / US 99 north
San Joaquin; SJ 0.00–38.78	Lodi	29.50	264B	SR 12 west (Kettleman Lane) – Fairfield	Southern end of SR 12 overlap; signed as exit 264 southbound
San Joaquin; SJ 0.00–38.78	Lodi	30.97	266	SR 12 east – Central Lodi, San Andreas	Northern end of SR 12 overlap
San Joaquin; SJ 0.00–38.78	Lodi	31.58	267A	Turner Road (SR 99 Bus. south, Cherokee Lane)	Former US 50 west / US 99 south
San Joaquin; SJ 0.00–38.78		31.72	267B	Frontage Road	
San Joaquin; SJ 0.00–38.78		32.57	268	Woodbridge Road	
San Joaquin; SJ 0.00–38.78		33.57	269	Acampo Road	
San Joaquin; SJ 0.00–38.78		34.58	270	Peltier Road (CR J12)	
San Joaquin; SJ 0.00–38.78	Collierville	35.60	271	Jahant Road	
San Joaquin; SJ 0.00–38.78	Collierville	36.67	272	Collier Road	
San Joaquin; SJ 0.00–38.78	Collierville	37.83	273	Liberty Road, Frontage Road	
South Fork Dry Creek		38.78 0.00	Bridge		
Sacramento; SAC 0.12–36.86	Galt	0.33	274A	Crystal Way, Boessow Road	Northbound exit and entrance
Sacramento; SAC 0.12–36.86	Galt	0.33	274A	Fairway Drive	Southbound exit and entrance
Sacramento; SAC 0.12–36.86	Galt	0.79	274B	Central Galt (C Street, A Street)	
Sacramento; SAC 0.12–36.86	Galt	1.57	275A	Elm Avenue, Simmerhorn Road (CR J10)	
Sacramento; SAC 0.12–36.86	Galt	1.88	275B	Pringle Avenue	Southbound exit and entrance
Sacramento; SAC 0.12–36.86	Galt	1.88	275B	Ayers Lane	Northbound exit and entrance
Sacramento; SAC 0.12–36.86	Galt	2.70	276	Walnut Avenue	No access across SR 99
Sacramento; SAC 0.12–36.86	Galt	3.53	277	SR 104 east (Twin Cities Road, CR E13) – Jackson	Western terminus of SR 104
Sacramento; SAC 0.12–36.86		4.39	278	Mingo Road	Northbound exit and entrance
Sacramento; SAC 0.12–36.86		4.39	278	West Stockton Boulevard	Southbound exit and entrance
Sacramento; SAC 0.12–36.86		6.01	280	Arno Road	
Sacramento; SAC 0.12–36.86		7.36	281	Dillard Road	
Sacramento; SAC 0.12–36.86	Elk Grove	8.96	283	Eschinger Road	Southbound exit and entrance
Sacramento; SAC 0.12–36.86	Elk Grove	10.07	284	Grant Line Road (CR E2), Kammerer Road	
Sacramento; SAC 0.12–36.86	Elk Grove	12.76	286	Elk Grove Boulevard (CR E12)	
Sacramento; SAC 0.12–36.86	Elk Grove	13.84	287	Laguna Boulevard, Bond Road	
Sacramento; SAC 0.12–36.86	Elk Grove	14.87	288	Sheldon Road	
Sacramento; SAC 0.12–36.86	Sacramento		—	Jacinto Road	Closed; former southbound exit and entrance
Sacramento; SAC 0.12–36.86	Sacramento	15.90	289	Cosumnes River Boulevard, Calvine Road	
Sacramento; SAC 0.12–36.86	Sacramento	17.24– 17.66	291	Stockton Boulevard, Bruceville Road, Mack Road	Signed as exits 291A (Mack Road east, Bruceville Road) and 291B (Mack Road west) southbound; Stockton Boulevard is former US 50 east / US 99 north
Sacramento; SAC 0.12–36.86	Sacramento	19.61	293	Florin Road	Signed as exits 293A (east) and 293B (west)
Sacramento; SAC 0.12–36.86	Sacramento	20.86	294	47th Avenue	Signed as exits 294A (east) and 294B (west)
Sacramento; SAC 0.12–36.86	Sacramento	21.57	295	Martin Luther King Jr. Boulevard	Northbound exit and southbound entrance
Sacramento; SAC 0.12–36.86	Sacramento	21.94	296	Fruitridge Road	Northbound exit to Fruitridge Road east is via exit 295
Sacramento; SAC 0.12–36.86	Sacramento	23.13	297	12th Avenue	
Sacramento; SAC 0.12–36.86	Sacramento	24.19	298B	Broadway (CR J8)	Southbound entrance only; former US 50 / US 99
Sacramento; SAC 0.12–36.86	Sacramento	R24.35 2.48 (Note: Indicates that the postmile represents the distance along unsigned I-305 (as indicated on the Caltrans I-80 BL exit list) rather than SR 99.)	—	US 50 east (Lincoln Highway) / I-80 BL east (Capital City Freeway east) – Reno, South Lake Tahoe	North end of state maintenance; left exit southbound, left entrances for US 50; left entrance southbound, left exits for I-80 BL; eastern terminus of unsigned I-305; southern end of US 50 / I-80 BL / I-305 overlap; northbound access to I-80 BL east and southbound access from US 50 west via unsigned SR 51; I-80 BL is former I-80 east; US 50 west exit 6B; I-80 BL west (SR 51 south) exit 6A
Sacramento; SAC 0.12–36.86	Sacramento	1.37	5 (Note: Exit number follows US 50 / I-80 BL rather than SR 99.)	16th Street	Northbound exit and southbound entrance; former US 99W / SR 160
Sacramento; SAC 0.12–36.86	Sacramento	1.37	5	15th Street	Southbound exit and northbound entrance; former US 99W / SR 160
Sacramento; SAC 0.12–36.86	Sacramento	0.61	4B	10th Street – Downtown Sacramento	Northbound exit and southbound entrance
Sacramento; SAC 0.12–36.86	Sacramento	0.35	—	US 50 west (I-80 BL / I-305 west) to I-80 – San Francisco	North end of US 50 / I-80 BL / I-305 overlap; northbound left exit and southbound left entrance; US 50 / I-80 BL east exit 4A; former I-80 west
Sacramento; SAC 0.12–36.86	Sacramento	0.35	—	I-5 south – Los Angeles	Northbound left exit and southbound left entrance; I-5 north exit 518
Sacramento; SAC 0.12–36.86	Sacramento	22.57 (Note: Indicates that the postmile represents the distance along I-5 rather than SR 99.)	—	X Street, Broadway	Southbound exit and northbound entrance
Sacramento; SAC 0.12–36.86	Sacramento	22.57	—	US 50 west (I-80 BL / I-305 west) to I-80 – San Francisco	Southbound exit only; US 50 / I-80 BL east exit 4A
Sacramento; SAC 0.12–36.86	Sacramento	22.57	—	I-5 south – Los Angeles	Southern end of I-5 overlap; southbound left exit and northbound left entrance; I-5 north exit 518
Sacramento; SAC 0.12–36.86	Sacramento	23.18	519A (Note: Exit number follows I-5 rather than SR 99.)	Q Street	Entrances are via P Street; serves Golden 1 Center
Sacramento; SAC 0.12–36.86	Sacramento	23.80	519B	J Street – Downtown Sacramento	Entrances are via I Street; serves Golden 1 Center
Sacramento; SAC 0.12–36.86	Sacramento	24.65	520	Richards Boulevard	
Sacramento; SAC 0.12–36.86	Sacramento	25.34	521A	Garden Highway	Signed as exit 521 southbound
Sacramento; SAC 0.12–36.86	Sacramento	25.97	521B	West El Camino Avenue	Northbound exit and southbound entrance
Sacramento; SAC 0.12–36.86	Sacramento	26.72	522	I-80 – San Francisco, Reno	Former I-880; I-80 exit 86
Sacramento; SAC 0.12–36.86	Sacramento	28.05	524	Arena Boulevard	
Sacramento; SAC 0.12–36.86	Sacramento	29.02	525A	Del Paso Road	
Sacramento; SAC 0.12–36.86	Sacramento	29.91 R32.12	306	I-5 north – Woodland, Redding	South end of state maintenance; left exit northbound, left entrance southbound; SR 99 north follows I-5 exit 525B
Sacramento; SAC 0.12–36.86	Sacramento	33.36	307	Elkhorn Boulevard (CR E14) – Rio Linda	
Sacramento; SAC 0.12–36.86		35.37	309	Elverta Road	
Sutter; SUT 0.00–42.39		0.95	311	Riego Road	
Sutter; SUT 0.00–42.39		0.95	Northern end of freeway		
Sutter; SUT 0.00–42.39		5.81	316	Howsley Road – Pleasant Grove	Interchange
Sutter; SUT 0.00–42.39		R8.07	319	SR 70 north – Marysville, Oroville	Interchange; northbound exit and southbound entrance; southern terminus of SR 70; former US 40 Alt.
Sutter; SUT 0.00–42.39		11.98		Nicolaus (Garden Highway, Nicolaus Avenue)	
Sutter; SUT 0.00–42.39		20.99		SR 113 south – Woodland	Interchange; northern terminus of SR 113; connects to East Tudor Road (former SR 99 south)
Sutter; SUT 0.00–42.39	Yuba City	T30.63		SR 20 (Colusa Avenue) – Colusa, Marysville	At-grade intersection
Sutter; SUT 0.00–42.39	Yuba City	T30.63	Southern end of freeway		
Sutter; SUT 0.00–42.39	Yuba City	R31.31	342	Queens Avenue	
Sutter; SUT 0.00–42.39		R33.95	344	Eager Road	
Sutter; SUT 0.00–42.39		R33.95	Northern end of freeway		
Butte		11.16		SR 162 west – Butte City, Willows	Southern end of SR 162 overlap
Butte		13.16		SR 162 east – Oroville	Northern end of SR 162 overlap
Butte	Durham	21.81		SR 149 south to SR 70 – Oroville, Marysville	Interchange; left exit southbound, left entrance northbound; northern terminus of SR 149
Butte	Durham	23.86	376	Durham (Durham-Dayton Highway)	Interchange
Butte	Chico	R30.60	Southern end of freeway		
Butte	Chico	R30.60	383	Park Avenue, Skyway (SR 99 Bus. north)	
Butte	Chico	R31.50	384	East 20th Street	
Butte	Chico	R32.45	385	SR 32 – Orland, Chester	
Butte	Chico	R33.28	386	East First Avenue	
Butte	Chico	R34.25	387A	Cohasset Road, Mangrove Avenue	
Butte	Chico	R34.93	387B	East Avenue	
Butte	Chico	R36.31	389	Eaton Road	Roundabout at northbound exit and entrance
Butte	Chico	R36.31	Northern end of freeway		
Butte				Esplanade (SR 99 Bus. south)	
Tehama; TEH 0.00–24.94		4.49		CR A9 (South Avenue) to I-5 – Corning, Woodson Bridge State Recreation Area	Upgraded to a roundabout in 2025
Tehama; TEH 0.00–24.94	Los Molinos	12.30		Aramayo Way (CR A8) – Tehama, Gerber	
Tehama; TEH 0.00–24.94		24.94		SR 36 – Lassen National Park, Susanville	Northern terminus of SR 99; highway continues as SR 36 west (former US 99E north)
1.000 mi = 1.609 km; 1.000 km = 0.621 mi: Closed/former; Concurrency terminus; Incomplete access; Unopened

== Business loops ==
=== Bakersfield ===
State Route 99 Business
- Location: Bakersfield

State Route 99 Business (SR 99 Bus.) in the city of Bakersfield follows Union Avenue and Golden State Avenue. Traveling north on SR 99, the business route begins at exit 11 (Union Avenue), and follows the original routing of US 99. Union Avenue is a rural, four-lane road for about six miles (9.7 km) until it enters Greenfield at Panama Road. From there, it continues north, passing by the Bakersfield Municipal Airport and the Kern County Fairgrounds. Union Avenue widens to six lanes at Ming Avenue, just a few miles before its intersection with SR 58. At the SR 58 junction, the designation SR 204 is added to the route. SR 99 Bus./SR 204 continues north on Union Avenue until the Union Avenue Y-intersection, where the designation heads northwest on Golden State Avenue. The route passes under SR 178 and over Chester Avenue at Garces Memorial Circle. At F Street, SR 99 Bus./SR 204 becomes a short four-lane freeway that terminates at SR 99 just before the Olive Drive exit.

Major intersections
The entire route is in Kern County.

Location	mi	km	Destinations	Notes
	0.0	0.0	SR 99 south – Los Angeles	Interchange; southern terminus; no access to SR 99 north; former US 99 south; SR 99 north exit 11
	2.8	4.5	SR 223 (Bear Mountain Boulevard)	
Greenfield	6.8	10.9	Taft Highway, Panama Road – Lamont, Taft, Maricopa	Former US 399 south; connects to SR 119
Bakersfield	8.8	14.2	Panama Lane	
Bakersfield	10.3	16.6	White Lane	
Bakersfield	11.8	19.0	Ming Avenue, Casa Loma Drive	
Bakersfield	12.7	20.4	SR 58 – Mojave	Interchange; south end of SR 204 overlap; southern terminus of SR 204; SR 58 exit 112
Bakersfield	12.7 17.6	20.4 28.3	SR 99 Bus. overlaps with SR 204	
Bakersfield	17.6	28.3	SR 99 north – Fresno, Sacramento	Interchange; northern terminus; north end of SR 204 overlap; no access to SR 99 south; northern terminus of SR 204; former US 99 north / US 466 west; SR 99 south exit 27
1.000 mi = 1.609 km; 1.000 km = 0.621 mi: Concurrency terminus; Incomplete access

=== Merced ===
State Route 99 Business
- 16th Street
- Location: Merced

State Route 99 Business (SR 99 Bus.) in the city of Merced follows 16th Street. The business route begins at SR 99 exit 186C and follows the original routing of US 99. It passes near downtown Merced and is concurrent with SR 59 for a short distance. SR 99 Bus. ends at SR 99 exit 189.

Major intersections
The entire route is in Merced County.

Location	mi	km	Destinations	Notes
Merced	0.0	0.0	SR 140 east – Mariposa, Yosemite	Continuation beyond SR 99
Merced	0.0	0.0	SR 99 south – Los Angeles	Interchange; southern terminus; no access to SR 99 north; former US 99 south; SR 99 north exit 186C
Merced	0.5	0.80	G Street – Downtown Merced	Serves UC Merced, Dignity Health – Mercy Medical Center Merced
Merced	0.8	1.3	Martin Luther King Jr. Way – Downtown Merced	Serves Merced County Fairgrounds; connects to SR 59 south / SR 99
Merced	1.0	1.6	M Street (Veterans Boulevard) – Civic Center	Serves Merced College
Merced	1.5	2.4	R Street	Connects to SR 99 south
Merced	1.9	3.1	SR 59 south (V Street) to SR 140 west – Gustine	South end of SR 59 overlap; connects to SR 99 north; serves Merced Regional Airport
Merced	2.2	3.5	SR 59 north (Snelling Highway) – Snelling, Coulterville, Lake McClure, Sonora	North end of SR 59 overlap; serves UC Merced, Merced College
	3.0	4.8	SR 99 – Sacramento, Los Angeles	Interchange; northern terminus; no access to 16th Street from SR 99 north; former US 99 north; SR 99 south exit 189
1.000 mi = 1.609 km; 1.000 km = 0.621 mi: Concurrency terminus; Incomplete access

=== Lodi ===
State Route 99 Business
- Cherokee Lane
- Location: Lodi

State Route 99 Business (SR 99 Bus.) in the city of Lodi follows Cherokee Lane. Traveling north on SR 99, the business route begins at exit 264 (Lodi exit), and follows the original routing of US 99, as well as US 50. Cherokee Lane is a four-lane thoroughfare for much of the business route. It ends at SR 99 at exit 267A (Turner Road).

Major intersections
The entire route is in Lodi, San Joaquin County.

mi	km	Destinations	Notes
0.0	0.0	Cherokee Lane	Continuation beyond Century Boulevard
0.0	0.0	SR 99 south / Century Boulevard	Interchange; southern terminus; no access to SR 99 north; Century Boulevard not accessible northbound; former US 50 west / US 99 south; SR 99 north exit 264
0.7	1.1	SR 12 (Kettleman Lane) – San Andreas, Rio Vista	
2.2	3.5	Victor Road to SR 12 east	
2.8	4.5	SR 99 / Turner Road – Fresno, Sacramento	Interchange; northern terminus; former US 50 east / US 99 north; SR 99 exit 267A
1.000 mi = 1.609 km; 1.000 km = 0.621 mi: Incomplete access

== See also ==
- Tule fog
