= Pleasant Grove, California =

Unincorporated community in California, United States

- Unincorporated community
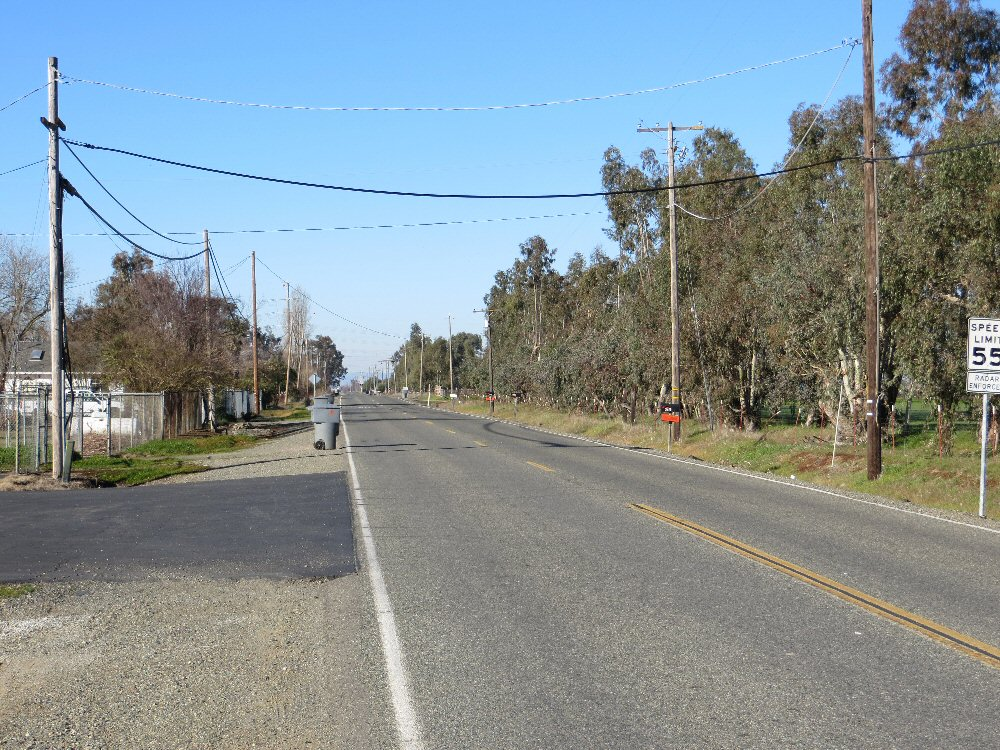
- Pleasant Grove
- Nickname: Gouge-Eye
- Location within California Location within the United States
- Coordinates: 38°49′26″N 121°29′02″W
- Country: United States
- State: California
- County: Sutter
- Elevation: 49 ft (15 m)
- Time zone: UTC-8 (Pacific (PST))
  - Summer (DST): UTC-7 (PDT)
- ZIP code: 95668
- Area codes: 916, 279
- GNIS feature ID: 230798

Pleasant Grove is an unincorporated community in Sutter County, California, United States. Pleasant Grove has a post office with ZIP code 95668.

== History ==
The community originated as a wagon and freight stop and was nicknamed "Gouge-Eye" after a saloon fight in which one man gouged out the eye of another. The post office opened as Pleasant Grove Creek in 1867, became Pleasant Grove in 1875, and moved 1.5 miles (2.4 km) east in 1940.

== Geography ==
Pleasant Grove is on California State Routes 99 and 70, 7.5 miles (12.1 km) southeast of Nicolaus.

== Education ==
Pleasant Grove is served by the Pleasant Grove Joint Union School District. Pleasant Grove School is in the community.

== Media ==
KFBK (AM) has a 50,000-watt transmitter on Pleasant Grove Road at Catlett Road in the community.

== Notable person ==
- Edwin E. Roberts, politician and mayor of Reno, Nevada.
