= Truck bypass =

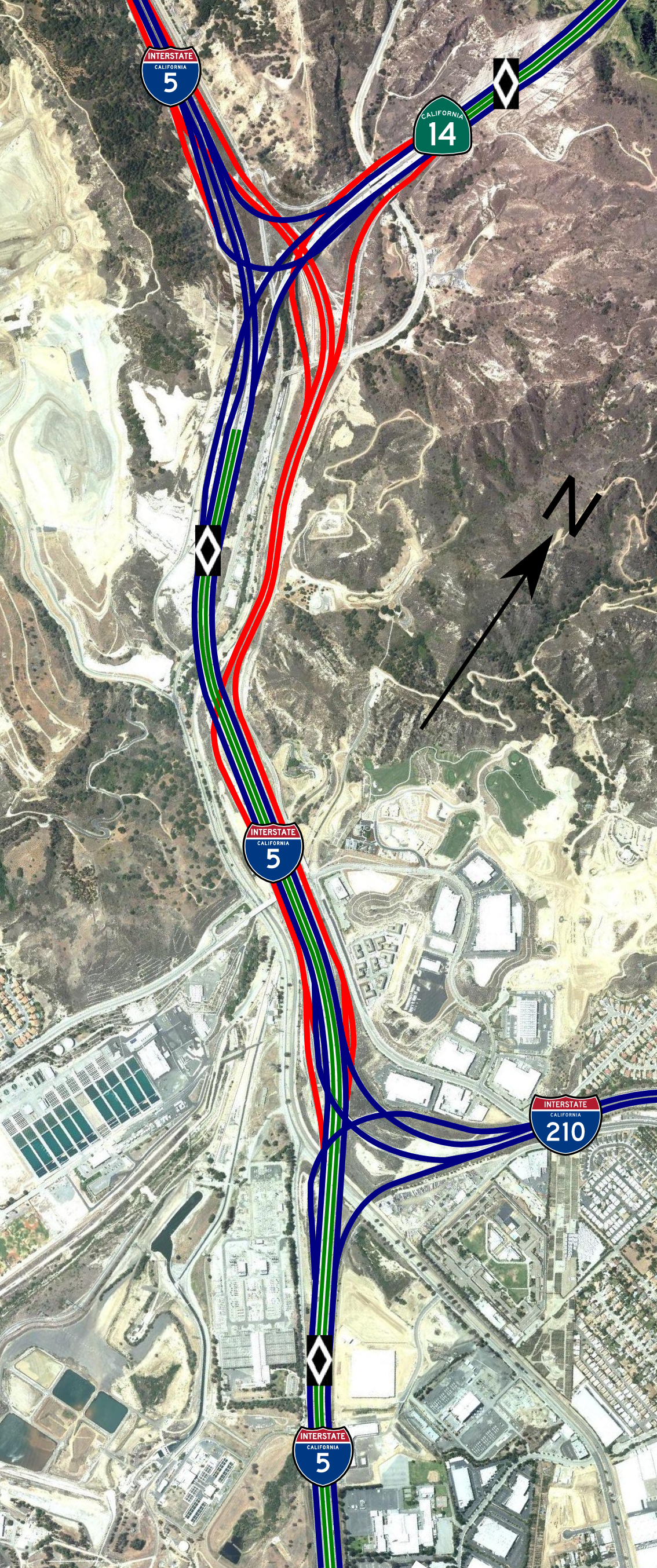
A labeled aerial photograph of the Newhall Pass Interchange showing significant geographic separation between the standard freeway route (blue and green) and the dedicated truck bypass (red).

A truck bypass is a roadway that provides physical separation of trucks from passenger vehicles at a freeway interchange in order to eliminate weaving between passenger cars traveling at higher speeds and trucks traveling at lower speeds. Typically a truck bypass exits the main freeway some distance before the interchange it is intended to bypass; trucks are usually required to use the bypass, while passenger cars may choose between the bypass and the main traffic lanes. A truck bypass may take the form of a dedicated roadway or a collector/distributor road. The bypass allows vehicles traveling on it to exit the interchange in the same possible directions as the main line of traffic, and then merges with the respective freeway at some point past the interchange.

Truck bypass should not be confused with truck lane; a truck lane is a lane dedicated for trucks on steep inclines that is not physically separated from the main highway.

== Notable examples ==
=== United States ===
==== California ====
- Interstate 5 with four locations
  - Southern terminus of Interstate 405 (El Toro Y interchange) in Irvine
  - Northern terminus of Interstate 405 near San Fernando
  - A truck route from the western terminus of I-210 to the southern terminus of SR 14 at the Newhall Pass Interchange. Trucks traveling on I-5 are separated from passenger cars onto a dedicated roadway to the east– the original U.S. Route 99 over which I-5 was built.
  - Southern terminus of SR 99 (southbound only) at the Wheeler Ridge Interchange near Wheeler Ridge
- Interstate 15 at the northern terminus of I-215 near San Bernardino
- Interstate 215 (southbound only) at the south end of its overlap with SR 60 in Riverside
- Interstate 580 (westbound only) at the western terminus of I-205 near Livermore

==== Georgia ====
Commercial Vehicle Lane Project on Interstate 75 from I-475 north of Macon to SR 20 near McDonough (construction to begin in 2024 with a 2028 completion date)

==== New Jersey ====
- New Jersey Turnpike, a toll road with a continuous car and truck split.

==== Oregon ====
- Interstate 5 (northbound only) after exit #294 to Barbur Boulevard (northern terminus of OR 99W) in Portland

== See also ==
- Runaway truck ramp
