= KSVG =

KSVG may refer to:

- a Scalable Vector Graphics solution for KHTML-based browsers
- KSVG-LP, a low-power radio station (103.5 FM) licensed to serve Bakersfield, California, United States
- KSVG (FM), a defunct radio station (89.7 FM) formerly licensed to serve Mettler, California
