= Wheeler Ridge, California =

Unincorporated community in California, United States

Wheeler Ridge
- Unincorporated community
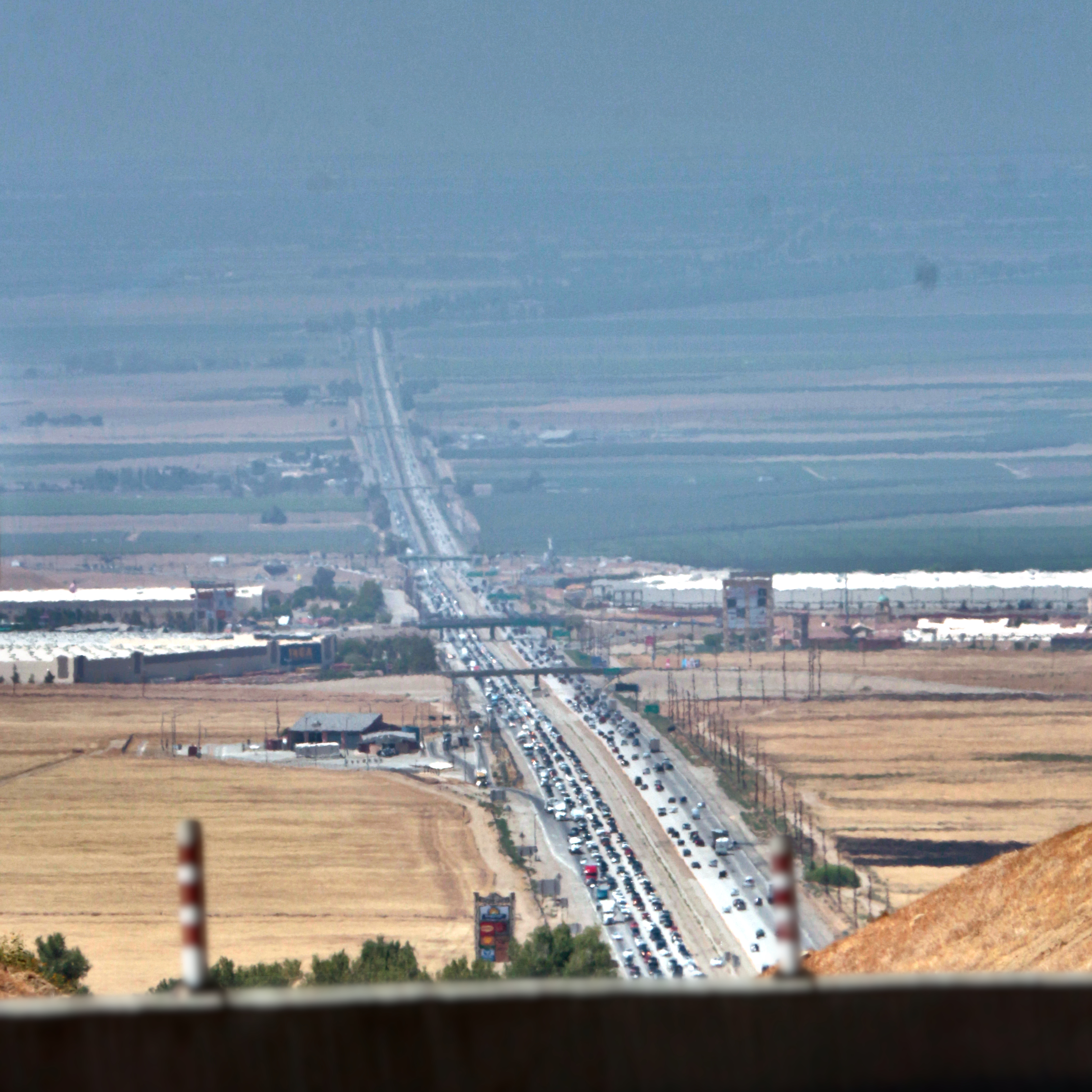
- Wheeler Ridge, and the Wheeler Ridge Interchange, viewed along SR 99 looking north from the Tejon Pass.

- Location in California Wheeler Ridge (the United States)
- Coordinates: 35°00′16″N 118°56′58″W
- Country: United States
- State: California
- County: Kern
- Elevation: 951 ft (290 m)
- GNIS feature ID: 253004

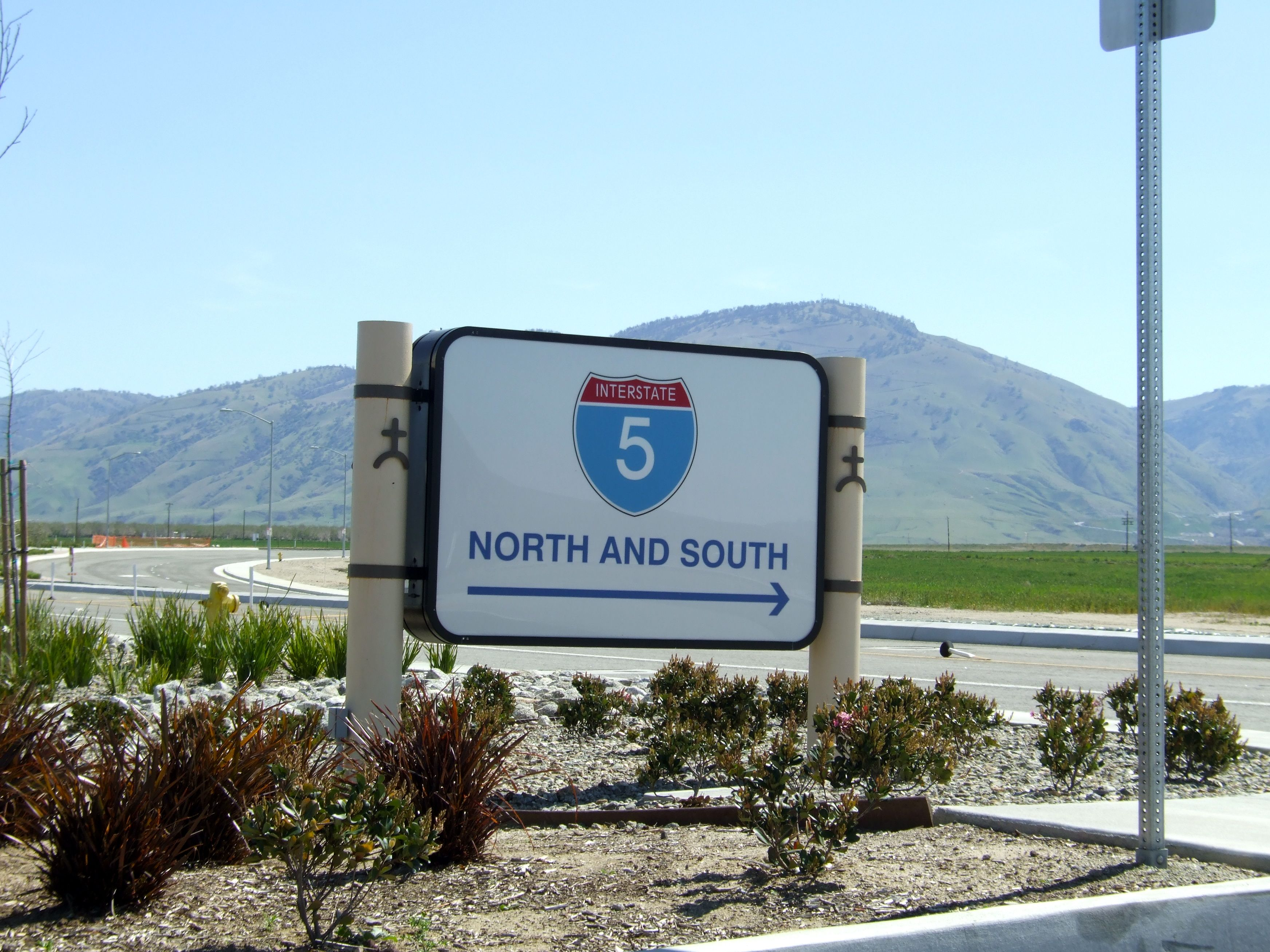
Highway directional sign in Wheeler Ridge, with Tehachapi Mountains beyond

Wheeler Ridge is an unincorporated community in the southwestern San Joaquin Valley, within Kern County, California, United States. It is at the junction of the valley floor and the Wheeler Ridge landform of the Tehachapi Mountains.

== Geography ==
The community is located at the Wheeler Ridge Interchange, the junction of State Route 99 and Interstate 5. It is 4.25 miles (6.8 km) south-southeast of Mettler, and southwest of Arvin.

Wheeler Ridge is at an elevation of 955 feet (291 m).

Street addresses in Wheeler Ridge are addressed as "Arvin, CA 93203" east of Interstate 5, and as "Lebec, CA 93243" west of Interstate 5. The community is inside area code 661.

== History ==
A post office operated at Wheeler Ridge from 1923 to 1972.

Before the development of the Grapevine commercial district to the south on Interstate 5, Wheeler Ridge had the last services southbound on U.S. Route 99 and I−5 before the steep 3,000 feet (910 m) climb up Tejon Pass. Before the 1964 state highway renumbering, old Route 99 passed through Wheeler Ridge.

=== Earthquakes ===
The epicenter of the magnitude 7.3 1952 Kern County earthquake (White Wolf earthquake), on the White Wolf Fault, was at Wheeler Ridge.

The settlement is north of the San Andreas Fault, which passes through the Sierra Pelona Mountains in the Tejon Pass area. Its last major event in the area was the magnitude 7.9 1857 Fort Tejon earthquake.

On April 16, 2005, a magnitude 5.2 earthquake on the White Wolf Fault struck near Wheeler Ridge.

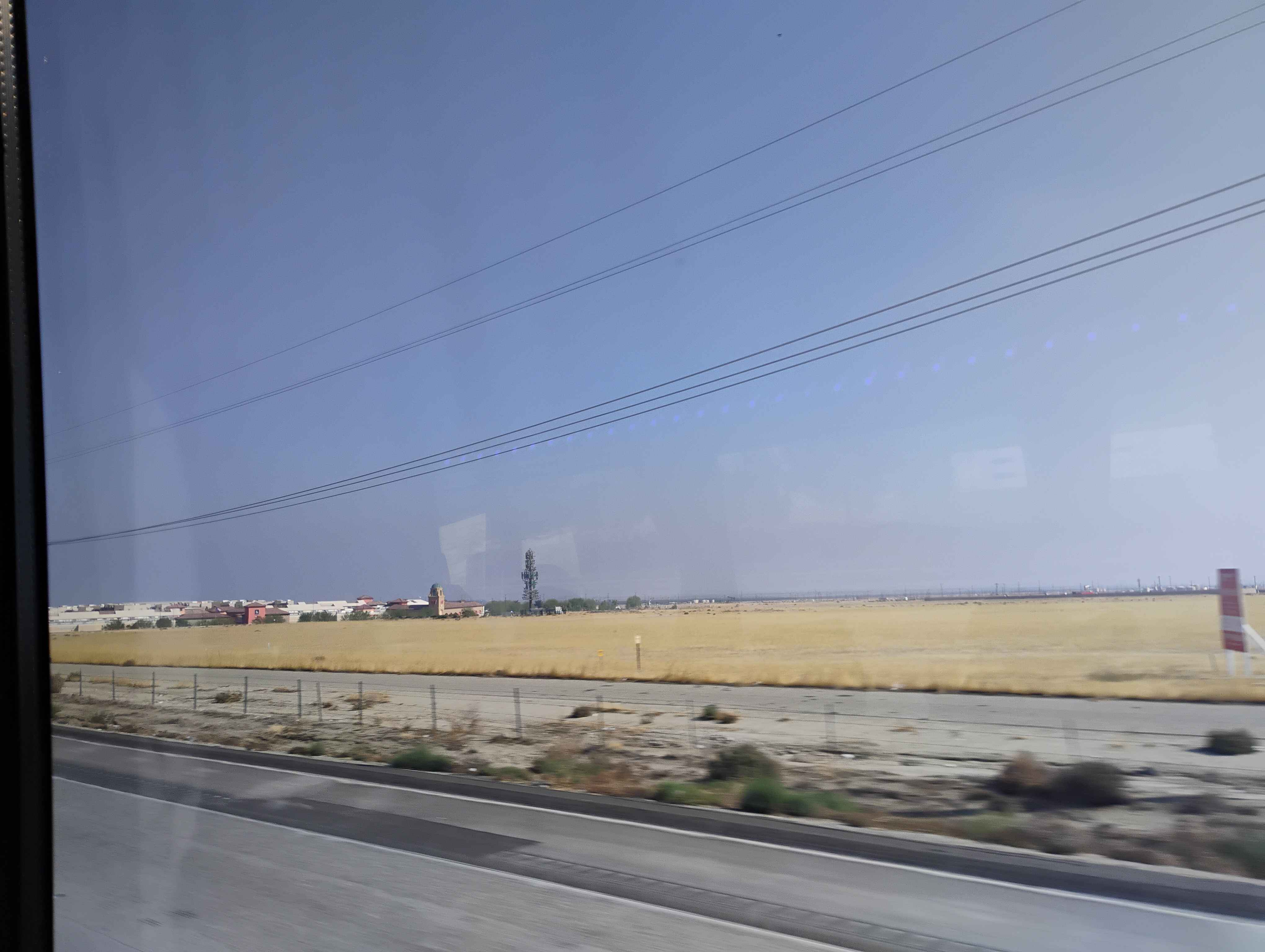
Wheeler Ridge, CA in 2025.

== See also ==
- Tejon Hills
- Tejon Ranch
