= Newhall Pass interchange =

Highway interchange in Los Angeles County, California

Newhall Pass Interchange
- Clarence Wayne Dean Memorial Interchange
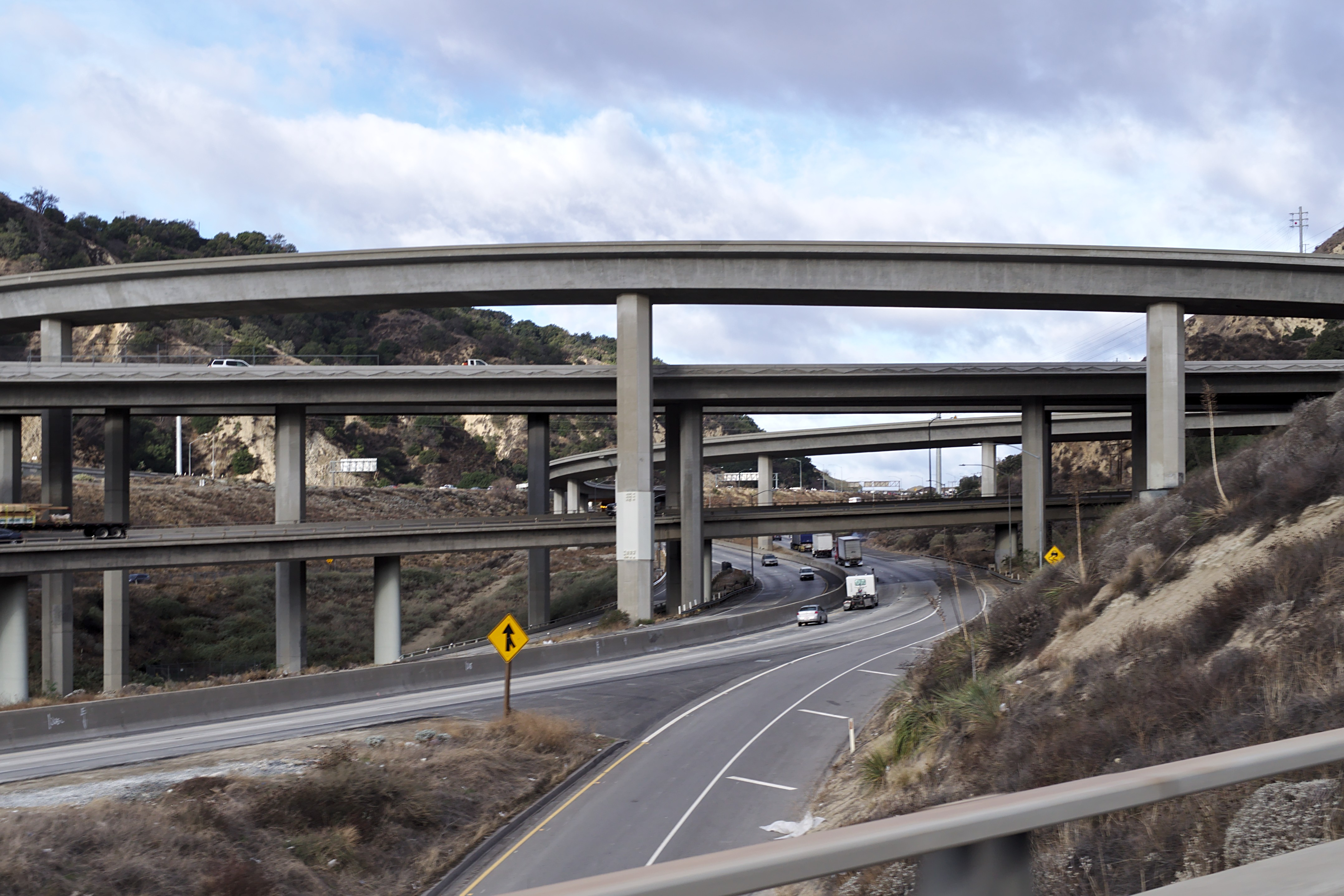
- View from truck bypass
- Interactive map of Newhall Pass Interchange

Location
- Los Angeles
- Coordinates: 34°20′06″N 118°30′30″W
- Roads at junction: I-5; SR 14

Construction
- Maintained by: Caltrans

The Newhall Pass interchange, officially the Clarence Wayne Dean Memorial Interchange, is a highway interchange at Newhall Pass in Southern California, United States. It is located at the northern end of Los Angeles near the neighborhoods of Granada Hills and Sylmar. The northern part of the interchange is in an unincorporated area that separates Los Angeles from the city of Santa Clarita to the north. The interchange connects Interstate 5 (I-5, Golden State Freeway) with California State Route 14 (SR 14, Antelope Valley Freeway). It is officially named in the memory of Los Angeles Police officer Clarence Wayne Dean, who was killed when he was unable to stop before going over a collapsed section of the interchange immediately following the 1994 Northridge earthquake.

The 5-14 Split, as the interchange is commonly referred to as by locals, is the northernmost of five freeway interchanges on I-5 within a 10-mile (16 km) stretch. From south to north, the freeways that interchange with I-5 include: SR 170 in Sun Valley, SR 118 in Mission Hills, I-405 also in Mission Hills, I-210, in Sylmar, and ultimately SR 14.

The interchange is extremely large, and consists of numerous flyover ramps and two tunnels. Portions of I-5 in the pass reach up to 21 lanes wide. The complex structure combines a directional T-interchange with a collector–distributor bypass. The bypass, signed as truck lanes, allows traffic to and from SR 14 to avoid the congested pass summit. These truck lanes extend south to the I-210 interchange, and have direct ramps to and from the Foothill Freeway. The bypass is the original four-lane freeway, built as U.S. Route 99.

== Incidents ==
=== 1971 collapse ===
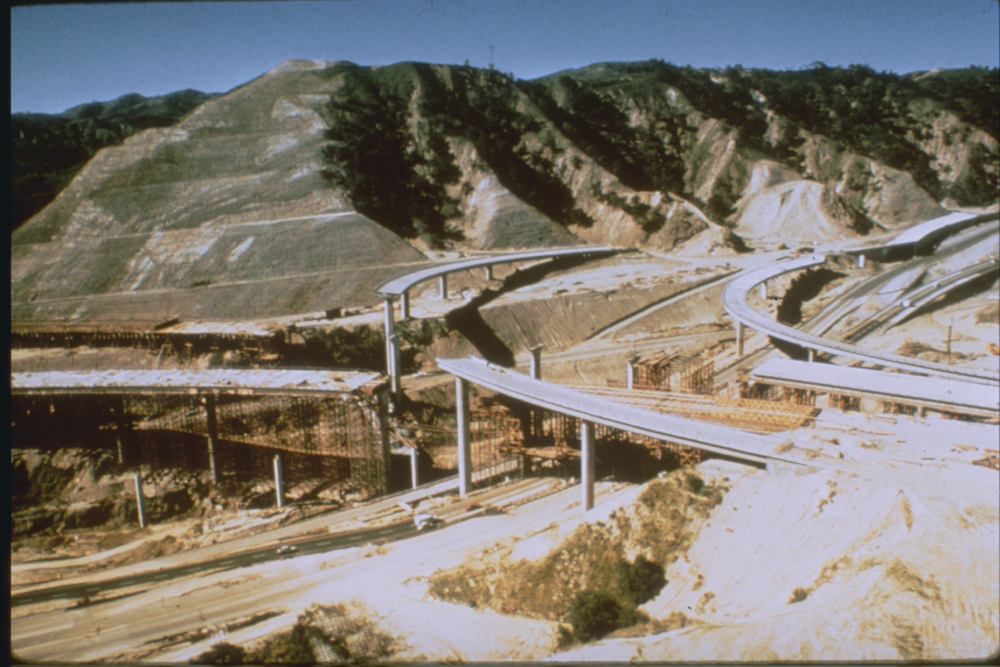
Aerial view of the collapsed freeway ramps in 1971

A total collapse of the southbound I-5 to northbound SR 14 overpass occurred as a result of the February 9, 1971 Sylmar earthquake. This collapse resulted in the additional collapse of the intersecting southbound SR 14 to southbound I-5 overpass (as this connector bridge was directly beneath the 5–14 overpass). Both bridges fell directly onto the southbound I-5 truck bypass. There was damage to all structures involved, varying from minor cracking and splaying, to the loss of complete sections of bridges.

The interchange was rebuilt in 1973, with additional steel rebar reinforcement.

=== 1994 collapse ===
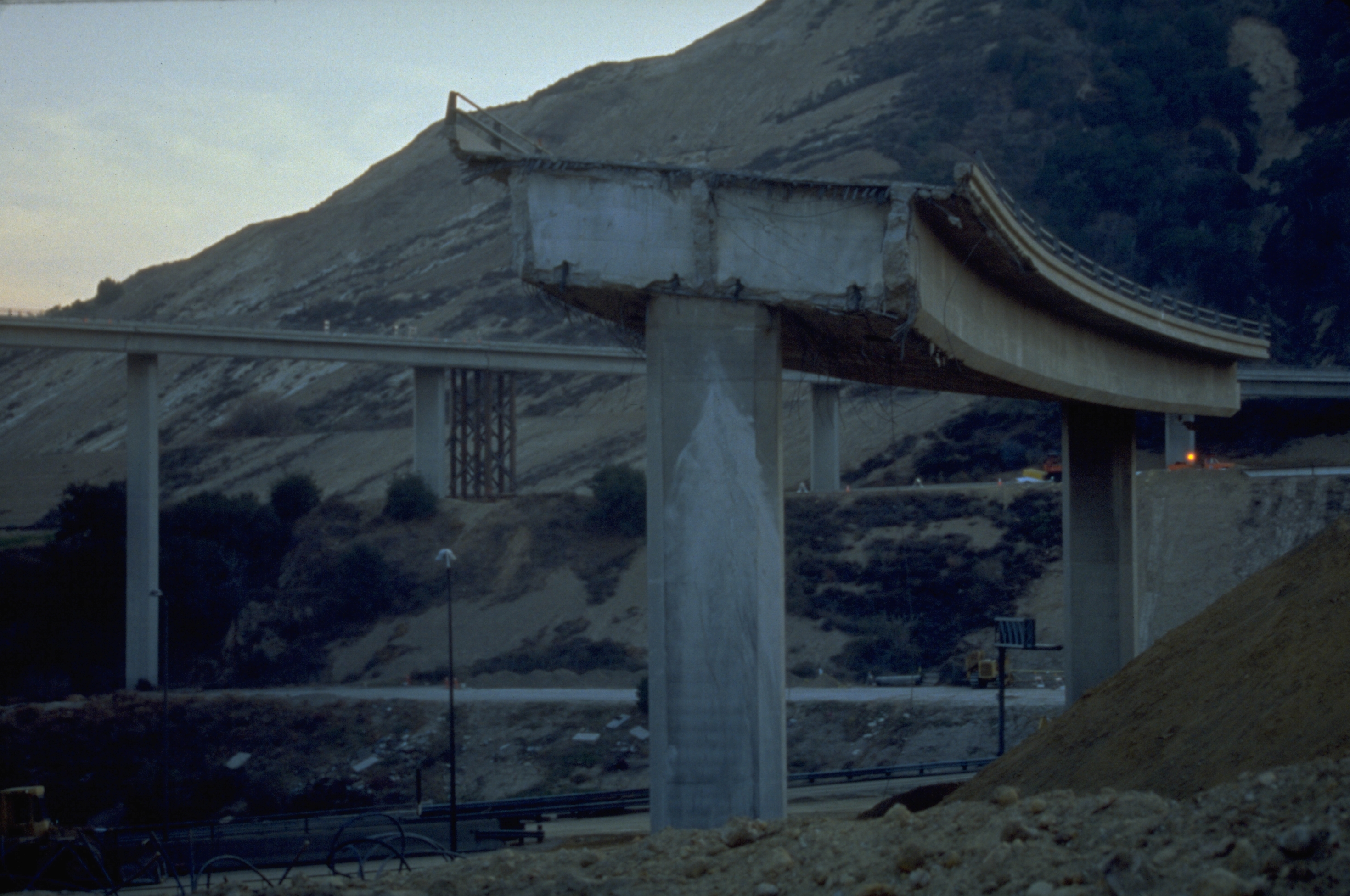
Remains of the SR 14 ramp following its collapse in 1994

The January 17, 1994, Northridge earthquake caused the southbound SR 14 to northbound I-5 connector to collapse and a bridge crossing San Fernando Road farther north along I-5 to partially fail. It also caused the southbound SR 14 to southbound I-5 overpass to collapse directly onto the main I-5 freeway and the southbound I-5 truck bypass, nearly exactly as had happened in the 1971 Sylmar earthquake. The collapse also closed the Metrolink's Antelope Valley Line, which began operation to Lancaster soon after.

The collapse of the southbound SR 14 ramp caused the death of Los Angeles Police Department motorcycle officer Clarence Wayne Dean, who, while reporting to work, fell from a partially collapsed bridge when he was unable to stop in time. The interchange was later dedicated the Clarence Wayne Dean Memorial Interchange in his honor.

In the weeks and months that followed, traffic was rerouted to San Fernando Road through the pass as reconstruction efforts began. The interchange was partially reopened on July 8, and completed in 1995 with additional reinforcing on the overpass support columns.

=== 2007 tunnel fire ===
Around 11:00 p.m. PDT on October 12, 2007, two trucks collided in the northernmost of two two-lane tunnels that take the southbound truck bypass roadway under the eight mainlanes of I-5 where it travels adjacent to the northbound truck bypass lanes. The tunnel is a 550 ft (170 m) long reinforced concrete box girder, built in 1975. It was last inspected in April 2007, and no problems were found.

Thirty commercial vehicles and one passenger vehicle were involved in the traffic collision. A resulting fire soon spread from vehicle to vehicle, eventually encompassing the entire tunnel with flames shooting nearly 100 ft (30 m) outside the tunnel and burning at around 1,400 °F (760 °C).. Three people died—including a 38-year-old male truck driver and his 6-year-old male passenger—and ten people were injured, none critically.

As a result of the accident and ensuing fire, all lanes of I-5 between Calgrove Boulevard and SR 14 were closed. In addition, the southbound onramps between SR 126 and Calgrove Boulevard were closed along with the northbound approaches from SR 14 and I-210.

Firefighters finished removing debris from the tunnel at 7:00 a.m. on October 14. Inspectors found heavy damage to the tunnel walls under the north portal. They also found a lot of spalling and exposed rebar, both of which can cause a loss of vertical support. However, the tunnel roof (or bridge) was found to be sound. The California Department of Transportation (Caltrans) worked through the weekend of October 13 and 14 to clear out and install five shoring supports inside the tunnel. At 4:20 p.m. on October 14, Caltrans opened up the two northbound truck bypass lanes to all traffic.

On Monday, October 15, the southbound mainline lanes of I-5 were reopened at 1:00 a.m. The northbound mainlane lanes were reopened two hours later. The speed limit on the southbound lanes was lowered to 55 mph (89 km/h) to help with the flow due to heavier congestion than normal. Emergency funding for the repairs was authorized for the damaged tunnel. Contractor C. C. Myers was placed on site with materials and workers to perform any needed repairs. During the repairs, the southbound I-5 truck lanes remained closed, while southbound trucks through the interchange were diverted onto the auto lanes.

The southbound I-5 truck lanes were reopened on Thursday, November 15, 2007. Security Paving of Oxnard performed the remaining repairs and made safety improvements to the tunnel which included the following:

- New pavement for the tunnel walls and the roadway.
- Improved tunnel lighting for both sides of the tunnel. This lighting is set to adjust depending on the weather conditions outside the tunnel.

In addition, the speed limit on the tunnel was lowered back to 45 mph (72 km/h).

== Projects ==
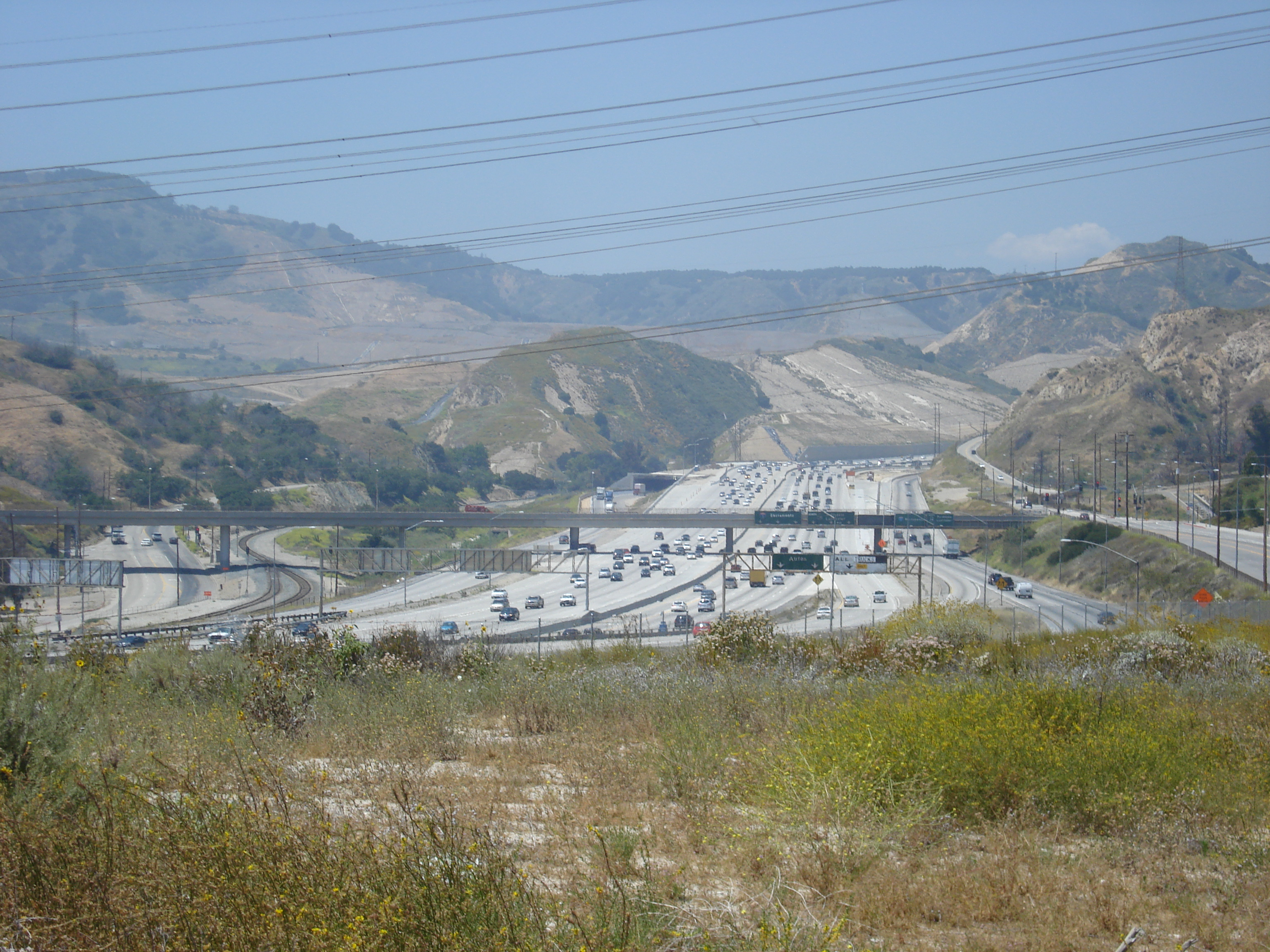
View from Sylmar of the southern portion of the interchange

=== HOV Direct Connector Project ===
In 2013, Caltrans completed an elevated HOV (high-occupancy vehicle) direct connector ramp, linking the recently completed I-5 HOV lanes to the existing SR 14 HOV lanes. This direct connector allows motorists a freeway-to-freeway transfer without exiting the carpool lane.

=== I-5 HOV/Truck Lane Project ===
Caltrans is currently carrying out environmental review of the I-5 HOV/Truck Lanes Project. This project will widen I-5 from the Newhall Pass Interchange north to Parker Road with new HOV lanes and truck lanes. The new HOV and truck lanes would connect with the existing HOV and truck lanes of the Newhall Pass Interchange. This project will cost approximately $2.8 billion.

== In popular culture ==
The interchange appears briefly in the 2015 disaster film San Andreas, where it collapses yet again during a 9.1 earthquake.

The cover photos for the Doobie Brothers' 1973 album The Captain and Me were taken at the interchange after it collapsed from the 1971 Sylmar earthquake.

The interchange features in the P.O.D. music video for Alive.
