= Wheeler Ridge Interchange =

Interchange in California

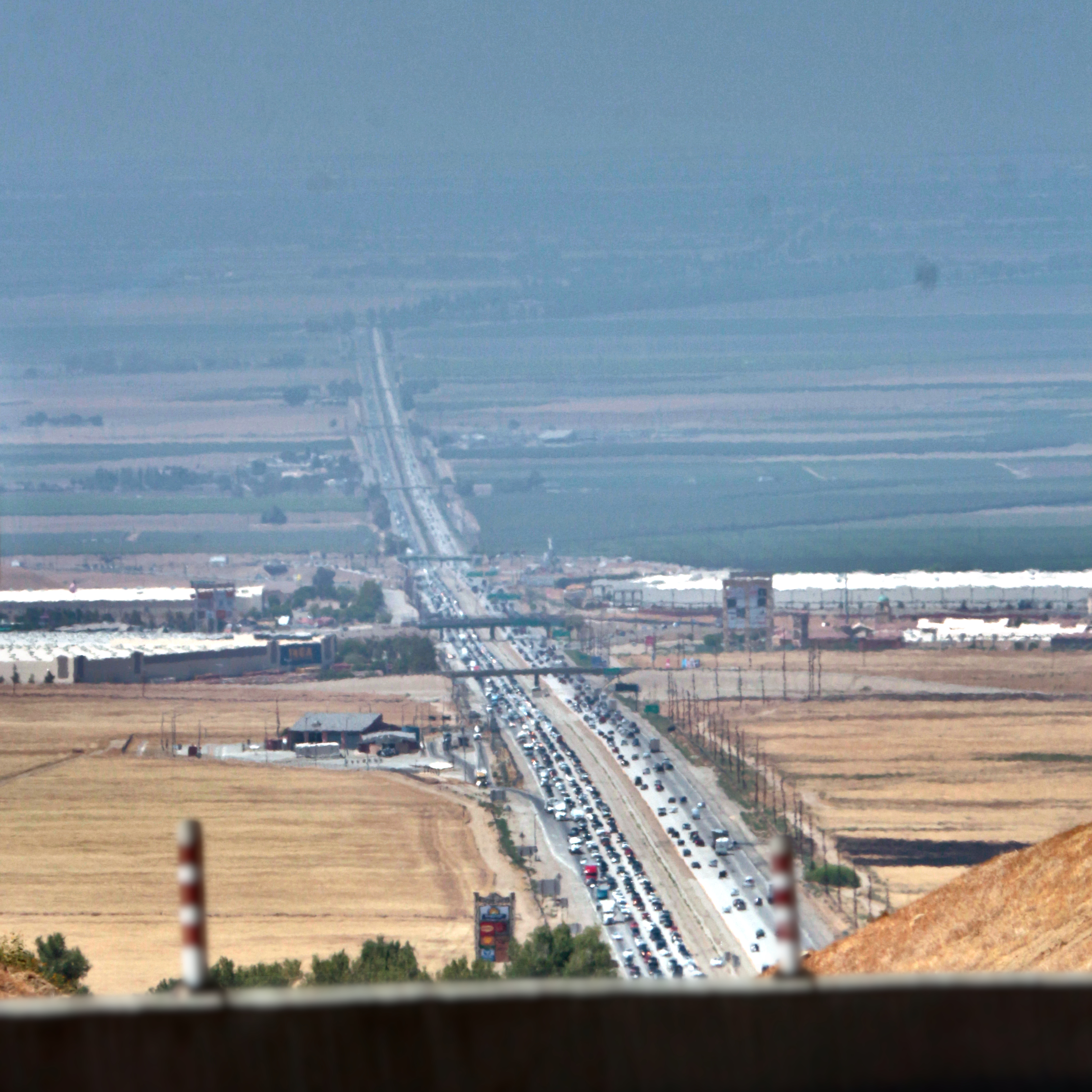
- SR 99, and the interchange, viewed from the south on I-5 near the Tejon Pass.
- Interactive map of Wheeler Ridge Interchange

Location
- Wheeler Ridge, California
- Coordinates: 35°0′50″N 118°57′15″W
- Roads at junction: I-5 (Golden State Freeway / Westside Freeway); SR 99 (Golden State Freeway)

Construction
- Type: Two level stack interchange
- Spans: 2
- Lanes: 8 (I-5 south), 6 (SR 99 north), 4 (I-5 north)
- Constructed: 1966-1967
- Opened: 1967
- Maintained by: Caltrans

The Wheeler Ridge Interchange is a freeway interchange near Wheeler Ridge, California, where State Route 99 (SR 99) merges with Interstate 5 (I-5). Located approximately 20 miles (32 km) south of Bakersfield, it is the southernmost freeway interchange in the San Joaquin Valley.

Principally, it can be seen as splitting northbound traffic from the Los Angeles area into the San Joaquin Valley's two major north–south routes: the Golden State Freeway (SR 99), which serves the major cities and commerce centers in the San Joaquin Valley, and the Westside Freeway (I-5), which bypasses most cities in the valley as a more direct route to the San Francisco Bay Area and Sacramento.

== Description ==
The interchange comprises three freeway segments or paths of travel:

- I-5 south (Golden State Freeway south) – Los Angeles
- I-5 north (Westside Freeway) – San Francisco, Sacramento
- SR 99 north (Golden State Freeway north) – Bakersfield, Fresno

Because of its location at the southernmost end of the San Joaquin Valley, the interchange is a major hub for traffic between the Los Angeles area and the valley. As the Golden State Freeway, I-5 approaches from the south after descending from the Tejon Pass in the Tehachapi Mountains. At the split, SR 99 heads roughly due north to Bakersfield, Fresno, and the other population centers in the valley. I-5 then continues as the Westside Freeway to the northwest toward the western part of the valley, to serve as a faster route to San Francisco, Sacramento, and other Northern California destinations.

The interchange has been confusing to some northbound drivers because of its design. This is due to the fact that the Westside Freeway is a relatively newer route than the other two directions, both of which used to be part of U.S. Route 99 (US 99). The two right northbound lanes on I-5 "exit" onto the Westside Freeway, while the left northbound mainline lanes continue onto SR 99.

The Wheeler Ridge Interchange includes the only truck bypass in Kern County. There are however no ramps connecting southbound I-5 directly with northbound SR 99; traffic must instead use State Route 166 a few miles north of the interchange.

== History ==
US 99 was built beginning in the 1920s. As the major route between Bakersfield and Los Angeles, it was routed through Wheeler Ridge, which was mostly ranchland at the time. When the Interstate Highway System was later designed in the 1950s, the decision was made to route I-5 onto the planned Westside Freeway instead of routing it onto US 99 through Bakersfield and the other major cities in the valley.

US 99 south of Bakersfield was then upgraded from a conventional highway to a freeway beginning in 1962. Five years later, the southern segment of the Westside Freeway and the Wheeler Ridge Interchange was built. By 1968, US 99 was completely decommissioned after I-5 replaced most of its routing; the 424-mile (682 km) stretch between Wheeler Ridge and Red Bluff was re-signed as SR 99.

The large number of trucks passing through the interchange resulted in the construction of a truck bypass for traffic traveling south in 1972. This would allow southbound cars to merge without negotiating the slower moving trucks, which needed enough time to move to the right slow lanes before the freeway started making its ascension up the Tehachapi Mountains to the Tejon Pass. A northbound truck bypass was considered unnecessary.

Since that time, the interchange has seen few changes, although the land directly south along the Laval Road would see increasing activity. The construction of the Tejon Industrial Complex, which contains both large distribution centers and traveler services, would increase traffic in the area. Continued economic growth in the San Joaquin Valley would also contribute to increasing traffic.

== See also ==
- Transportation in Kern County, California
