= Woodson Bridge State Recreation Area =

State park in California, United States

Coordinates: 39.917380°N 122.091375°W

Woodson Bridge State Recreation Area is a woodland park located along the Sacramento River in Tehama County, California.

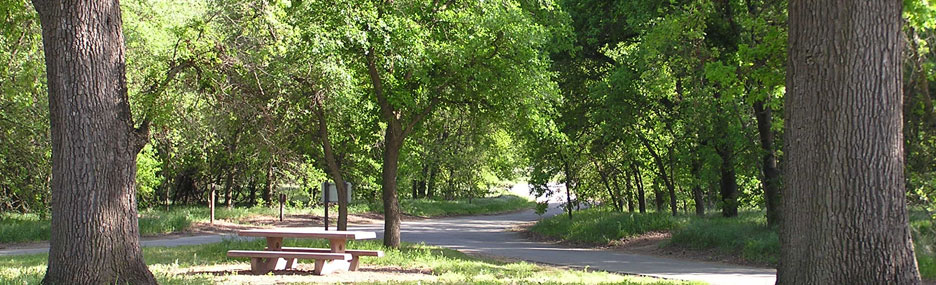
A picnic area in Woodson Bridge State Recreation Area
