= Tipton, California =

Tipton
- census-designated place
- Location in Tulare County and the state of California

- Location in the United States
- Coordinates: 36°3′33″N 119°18′37″W
- Country: United States
- State: California
- County: Tulare

Area
  - Total: 1.726 sq mi (4.471 km^{2})
  - Land: 1.726 sq mi (4.471 km^{2})
  - Water: 0 sq mi (0 km^{2}) 0%
- Elevation: 276 ft (84 m)

Population (2020)
  - Total: 2,519
  - Density: 1,459/sq mi (563.4/km^{2})
- Time zone: UTC-8 (Pacific (PST))
  - Summer (DST): UTC-7 (PDT)
- ZIP code: 93272
- Area code: 559
- FIPS code: 06-78750
- GNIS feature ID: 1652801

Tipton is a census-designated place (CDP) in Tulare County, California, United States. The population was 2,519 at the 2020 census, down from 2,543 at the 2010 census.

== Geography ==
Tipton is located at 36°3′33″N 119°18′37″W (36.059115, -119.310409).

According to the United States Census Bureau, the CDP has a total area of 1.7 square miles (4.4 km^{2}), all land.

== Demographics ==
Historical population
| Census | Pop. | Note | %± |
|---|---|---|---|
| 1980 | 1,185 | | — |
| 1990 | 1,383 | | 16.7% |
| 2000 | 1,790 | | 29.4% |
| 2010 | 2,543 | | 42.1% |
| 2020 | 2,519 | | −0.9% |
U.S. Decennial Census; 1860–1870 1880-1890; 1900 1910 1920; 1930 1940 1950; 1960 1970 1980; 1990 2000 2010

Tipton first appeared as a census designated place in the 1980 U.S. census.

=== 2020 census ===
As of the 2020 census, Tipton had a population of 2,519. The population density was 1,459.4 inhabitants per square mile (563.5/km^{2}).

Racial composition as of the 2020 census
| Race | Number | Percent |
|---|---|---|
| White | 569 | 22.6% |
| Black or African American | 13 | 0.5% |
| American Indian and Alaska Native | 48 | 1.9% |
| Asian | 6 | 0.2% |
| Native Hawaiian and Other Pacific Islander | 1 | 0.0% |
| Some other race | 1,539 | 61.1% |
| Two or more races | 343 | 13.6% |
| Hispanic or Latino (of any race) | 2,204 | 87.5% |

The census reported that 99.7% of the population lived in households, 0.3% lived in non-institutionalized group quarters, and no one was institutionalized. 0.0% of residents lived in urban areas, while 100.0% lived in rural areas.

There were 649 households, out of which 53.3% included children under the age of 18, 57.0% were married-couple households, 5.7% were cohabiting couple households, 19.3% had a female householder with no partner present, and 18.0% had a male householder with no partner present. 9.9% of households were one person, and 3.7% were one person aged 65 or older. The average household size was 3.87. There were 564 families (86.9% of all households).

The age distribution was 34.5% under the age of 18, 11.7% aged 18 to 24, 28.3% aged 25 to 44, 18.5% aged 45 to 64, and 7.0% who were 65 years of age or older. The median age was 27.4 years. For every 100 females, there were 105.3 males, and for every 100 females age 18 and over there were 106.6 males age 18 and over.

There were 667 housing units at an average density of 386.4 units per square mile (149.2 units/km^{2}), of which 649 (97.3%) were occupied. Of these, 44.8% were owner-occupied, and 55.2% were occupied by renters. 2.7% were vacant. The homeowner vacancy rate was 0.3% and the rental vacancy rate was 1.6%.

=== Income and poverty ===
In 2023, the US Census Bureau estimated that the median household income was $51,389, and the per capita income was $17,380. About 29.9% of families and 27.1% of the population were below the poverty line.

=== 2010 census ===
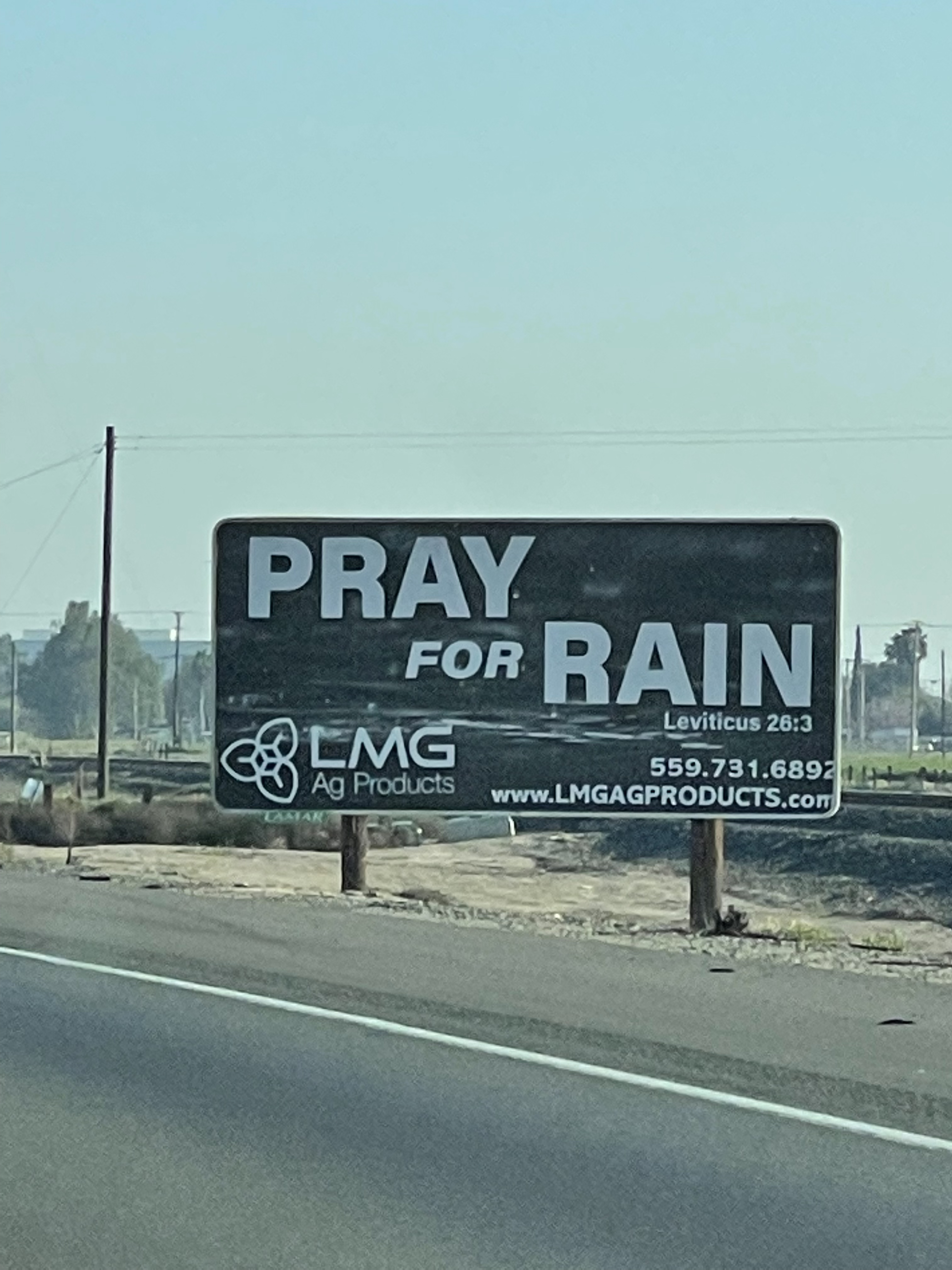
A billboard in Tipton in 2022.

The 2010 United States census reported that Tipton had a population of 2,543. The population density was 2,518.5 inhabitants per square mile (972.4/km^{2}). The racial makeup of Tipton was 1,535 (60.4%) White, 3 (0.1%) African American, 15 (0.6%) Native American, 9 (0.4%) Asian, 0 (0.0%) Pacific Islander, 924 (36.3%) Portuguese and other races, and 57 (2.2%) from two or more races. Hispanic or Latino of any race were 2,147 persons (84.4%).

The Census reported that 2,543 people (100% of the population) lived in households, 0 (0%) lived in non-institutionalized group quarters, and 0 (0%) were institutionalized.

There were 610 households, out of which 393 (64.4%) had children under the age of 18 living in them, 353 (57.9%) were opposite-sex married couples living together, 92 (15.1%) had a female householder with no husband present, 80 (13.1%) had a male householder with no wife present. There were 58 (9.5%) unmarried opposite-sex partnerships, and 6 (1.0%) same-sex married couples or partnerships. 67 households (11.0%) were made up of individuals, and 30 (4.9%) had someone living alone who was 65 years of age or older. The average household size was 4.17. There were 525 families (86.1% of all households); the average family size was 4.45.

The population age distribution is 1,036 people (40.7%) under the age of 18, 276 people (10.9%) aged 18 to 24, 745 people (29.3%) aged 25 to 44, 360 people (14.2%) aged 45 to 64, and 126 people (5.0%) who were 65 years of age or older. The median age was 24.0 years. For every 100 females, there were 107.6 males. For every 100 females age 18 and over, there were 111.7 males.

There were 645 housing units at an average density of 638.8 per square mile (246.6/km^{2}), of which 290 (47.5%) were owner-occupied, and 320 (52.5%) were occupied by renters. The homeowner vacancy rate was 1.4%; the rental vacancy rate was 7.5%. 1,174 people (46.2% of the population) lived in owner-occupied housing units and 1,369 people (53.8%) lived in rental housing units.

== Government ==
In the California State Legislature, Tipton is in the 16th senatorial district, represented by Democrat Melissa Hurtado, and in the 33rd Assembly district, represented by Republican Alexandra Macedo.

In the United States House of Representatives, Tipton is in California's 22nd congressional district, represented by Republican David Valadao

== History ==
When construction of the Southern Pacific Railroad halted temporarily in 1872, a small community started to form at the end of the railroad. The residents named their community "Tip Town", signifying that it was at the end of the railroad. The post office changed the name to Tipton when construction restarted in 1873.

== Education ==
The CDP is served by the Tipton Elementary School District and the Tulare Joint Union High School Districts.
