= Mettler, California =

- Unincorporated community Census-designated place
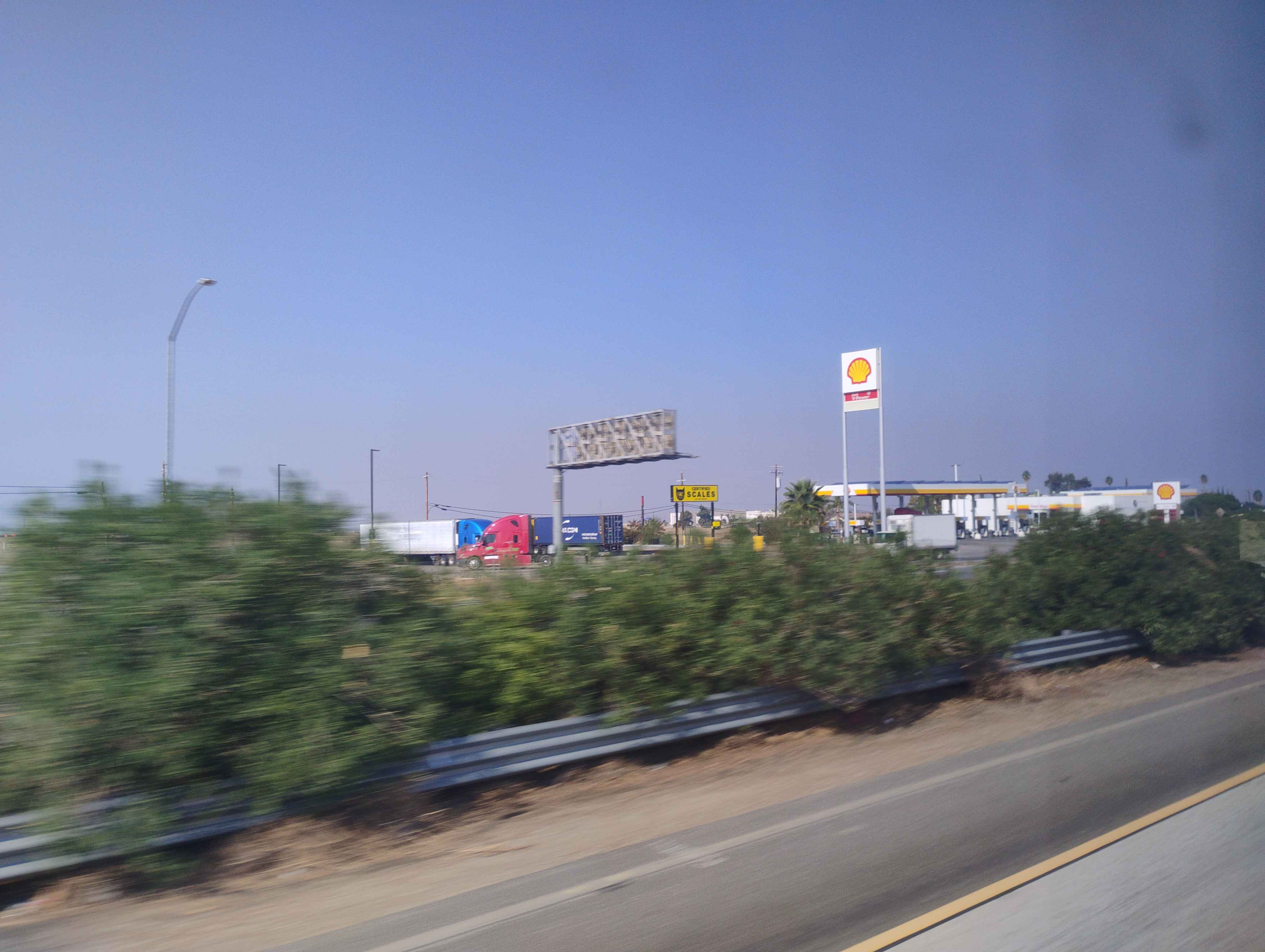
- Mettler in 2025.

- Location in Kern County and the state of California

- Location in the United States
- Coordinates: 35°03′50″N 118°58′12″W
- Country: United States
- State: California
- County: Kern

Government
  - Senate: Shannon Grove (R)
  - Assembly: Stan Ellis (R)
  - U. S. Congress: Vince Fong (R)

Area
  - Total: 0.232 sq mi (0.602 km^{2})
  - Land: 0.232 sq mi (0.602 km^{2})
  - Water: 0 sq mi (0 km^{2}) 0%
- Elevation: 541 ft (165 m)

Population (2020)
  - Total: 90
  - Density: 390/sq mi (150/km^{2})
- Time zone: UTC-8 (PST)
  - Summer (DST): UTC-7 (PDT)
- ZIP code: 93381
- Area code: 661
- FIPS code: 06-47164
- GNIS feature ID: 0245837

Mettler, or Mettler Station, is an unincorporated area in Kern County, California, United States. Actor James Dean received a speeding ticket here the same day as his fatal car accident.

The population was 90 at the 2020 census, down from 136 at the 2010 census. For statistical purposes, the United States Census Bureau has defined that community as a census-designated place (CDP).

== History ==
=== Founding ===
According to the publication California's Geographic Names, Mettler was founded in 1941, but an obituary of Clifford Alvin Mettler in The Bakersfield Californian reported that the settlement was founded by him, his father, William H. Mettler, and his brother (unnamed) in the "late 1940s" in the Wheeler Ridge area, which settlement "later became known as Mettler Station."

=== James Dean ===
On September 30, 1955, motion picture actor James Dean was driving north on Highway U.S. 99 when he was stopped by California Highway Patrol officer O.V. Hunter and given a ticket for speeding. The officer wrote Mettler Station as the location of the infraction. Later that day, Dean would be killed in a fatal car crash as he continued his journey north.

== Geography ==
Mettler is 25 miles (40 km) south of Bakersfield. The locality has an area of 0.2 square miles (0.52 km^{2}), all land, and an elevation of 541 feet (165 m).

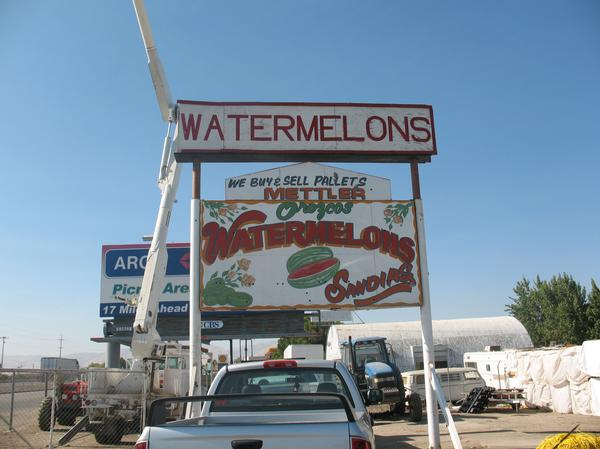
A watermelon stand in Mettler, CA

== Demographics ==
Historical population
Census	Pop.	Note	%±
2000	157		—
2010	136		−13.4%
2020	90		−33.8%
U.S. Decennial Census; 1860–1870 1880-1890; 1900 1910 1920; 1930 1940 1950; 1960 1970 1980; 1990 2000 2010; 2020

Mettler first appeared as a census designated place in the 2000 U.S. census.

=== 2020 ===
Mettler CDP, California – Racial and ethnic composition Note: the US Census treats Hispanic/Latino as an ethnic category. This table excludes Latinos from the racial categories and assigns them to a separate category. Hispanics/Latinos may be of any race.
Race / Ethnicity (NH = Non-Hispanic)	Pop 2000	Pop 2010	Pop 2020	% 2000	% 2010	% 2020
White alone (NH)	24	23	21	15.29%	16.91%	23.33%
Black or African American alone (NH)	0	0	0	0.00%	0.00%	0.00%
Native American or Alaska Native alone (NH)	0	0	1	0.00%	0.00%	1.11%
Asian alone (NH)	0	0	0	0.00%	0.00%	0.00%
Native Hawaiian or Pacific Islander alone (NH)	0	0	0	0.00%	0.00%	0.00%
Other race alone (NH)	0	1	0	0.00%	0.74%	0.00%
Mixed race or Multiracial (NH)	0	3	4	0.00%	2.21%	4.44%
Hispanic or Latino (any race)	133	109	64	84.71%	80.15%	71.11%
Total	157	136	90	100.00%	100.00%	100.00%

At the 2020 census Mettler is reported as having a population of 90. However, due to the margins of error introduced by the application of differential privacy algorithms as a "top down" disclosure avoidance measure to the 2020 census data, along with the various other operational issues related to the simultaneous COVID-19 pandemic this population number is questionable.

=== 2010 ===
At the 2010 census Mettler had a population of 136. The population density was 584.8 inhabitants per square mile (225.8/km^{2}). The racial makeup of Mettler was 74 (54.4%) White, 0 (0.0%) African American, 0 (0.0%) Native American, 0 (0.0%) Asian, 0 (0.0%) Pacific Islander, 43 (31.6%) from other races, and 19 (14.0%) from two or more races. Hispanic or Latino of any race were 109 people (80.1%).

The whole population lived in households, no one lived in non-institutionalized group quarters and no one was institutionalized.

There were 31 households, 17 (54.8%) had children under the age of 18 living in them, 17 (54.8%) were opposite-sex married couples living together, 8 (25.8%) had a female householder with no husband present, 2 (6.5%) had a male householder with no wife present. There were 2 (6.5%) unmarried opposite-sex partnerships, and 0 (0%) same-sex married couples or partnerships. 4 households (12.9%) were one person and 1 (3.2%) had someone living alone who was 65 or older. The average household size was 4.39. There were 27 families (87.1% of households); the average family size was 4.74.

The age distribution was 37 people (27.2%) under the age of 18, 24 people (17.6%) aged 18 to 24, 30 people (22.1%) aged 25 to 44, 34 people (25.0%) aged 45 to 64, and 11 people (8.1%) who were 65 or older. The median age was 28.5 years. For every 100 females, there were 109.2 males. For every 100 females age 18 and over, there were 130.2 males.

There were 36 housing units at an average density of 154.8 per square mile, of the occupied units 18 (58.1%) were owner-occupied and 13 (41.9%) were rented. The homeowner vacancy rate was 0%; the rental vacancy rate was 0%. 62 people (45.6% of the population) lived in owner-occupied housing units and 74 people (54.4%) lived in rental housing units.

=== 2000 ===
At the 2000 census 157 people lived in 31 households (37 housing units). The average household size was about five people. Mettler's population was about six years younger than California at large.

2000 figures	Mettler	California	United States
Median age	27	33.3	35.3
White	47.1%	59.5%	75.1%
African-American	None	6.7%	12.3%
Hispanic/Latino	84.7%	32.4%	12.5%
Family income	$28,750	$53,025	$50,046
Poverty families	5.9%	10.6%	9.2%
Med. home value	$71,500	$211,500	$119,600
High school diploma	42.1%	76.8%	80.4%
College degree	7.0%	28.6%	24.4%

== Newspapers ==
- The Bakersfield Californian
- The Mountain Enterprise
