= Nicolaus, California =

Nicolaus
- Census-designated place
- Position in California.
- Coordinates: 38°53′53″N 121°34′22″W
- Country: United States
- State: California
- County: Sutter

Area
  - Total: 3.131 sq mi (8.108 km^{2})
  - Land: 3.131 sq mi (8.108 km^{2})
  - Water: 0 sq mi (0 km^{2}) 0%
- Elevation: 26 ft (7.9 m)

Population (2020)
  - Total: 176
  - Density: 56.2/sq mi (21.7/km^{2})
- Time zone: UTC-8 (Pacific (PST))
  - Summer (DST): UTC-7 (PDT)
- GNIS feature ID: 2583093

Nicolaus is a census-designated place (CDP) in Sutter County, California, United States. Nicolaus is part of the Yuba City Metropolitan Statistical Area. Nicolaus sits at an elevation of 26 feet (7.9 m). The 2020 United States census reported Nicolaus's population was 176.

It is named after Nicolaus Allgeier, a local rancher. The town's former names included Nicolaus Ferry and Nicolaus' Ranche.

== History ==
Nicolaus Allgeier established a ferry at what later became the town of Nicolaus in 1843 to cross the Feather River on the road between Sutter's Fort and Sutter's Hock Farm. The town was established in 1850 and has had a post office since July 28, 1851 making it one of the oldest post offices in the state.

Nicolaus was an early major stopping point on the Feather River during the California Gold Rush. It was the county seat of Sutter County in 1850-1851 and again 1852-1856 except for two months in 1854 when it was located in Yuba City. The area was described by R.T.P., Allen, Special Agent of the United States Government for the purpose of selecting early post offices in California as "a most beautiful country...[t]he country bordering the Feather River (near Nicolaus) is by far the most fertile and most beautiful I have seen in California."

Nicolaus was once home to a significant Chinese American community, but it violently drove all its Chinese American residents out of town in March 1886. It was also home to a large mixed population of Maidu Indians and Hawaiians, or Kanakas, which has since relocated to El Dorado County, California. The Hawaiians or Kanakas are descendants of workers brought over by John Sutter in 1839.

The town itself has approximately 200 residents and the outlying area has a population of roughly 600. The town is located just off State Highway 99 and adjoins the Feather River. The State Highway used to go through the town but a major flood in 1955 tore out the bridge over the Feather River and the town's commercial district has declined since that time.

The community is inside area code 530. The zip code is 95659 that also encompasses the communities of East Nicolaus, Trowbridge, Lee and Verona. It is served by East Nicolaus High School that is renowned for its male and female sports teams. The football team was the State of California Small Schools Champion in 2015 and has won several section titles in football and other sports. It is also served by Marcum-Illinois Elementary School.

Recreational opportunities abound in the area. Golfers have access to the River Oaks Golf Course, a public 18-hole course, which is located next to the Feather River. The area is an outdoor paradise widely known for its hunting, fishing and bird watching. It is also known for canoeing and kayaking on the Feather River and for bicycling along its roads.

The area is unique in that it has retained its rural character yet is only 20 minutes north of Sacramento, the state capital. The economy of the Nicolaus area is driven by farming and walnut orchards and rice farming predominate. The town of Nicolaus is the site of an annual Labor Day parade, which attracts visitors from throughout the state.

== Geography ==
According to the United States Census Bureau, the CDP covers an area of 3.1 square miles (8.1 km^{2}), all land.

=== Climate ===
According to the Köppen Climate Classification system, Nicolaus has a warm-summer Mediterranean climate, abbreviated "Csa" on climate maps.

== Demographics ==
Historical population
Census	Pop.	Note	%±
2010	211		—
2020	176		−16.6%
U.S. Decennial Census; 2010

Nicolaus first appeared as a census designated place in the 2010 U.S. census.

The 2020 United States census reported that Nicolaus had a population of 176. The population density was 56.2 inhabitants per square mile (21.7/km^{2}). The racial makeup of Nicolaus was 146 (83.0%) White, 1 (0.6%) African American, 2 (1.1%) Native American, 6 (3.4%) Asian, 0 (0.0%) Pacific Islander, 11 (6.3%) from other races, and 10 (5.7%) from two or more races. Hispanic or Latino of any race were 26 persons (14.8%).

The whole population lived in households. There were 82 households, out of which 27 (32.9%) had children under the age of 18 living in them, 53 (64.6%) were married-couple households, 3 (3.7%) were cohabiting couple households, 2 (2.4%) had a female householder with no partner present, and 24 (29.3%) had a male householder with no partner present. 22 households (26.8%) were one person, and 8 (9.8%) were one person aged 65 or older. The average household size was 2.15. There were 57 families (69.5% of all households).

The age distribution was 33 people (18.8%) under the age of 18, 15 people (8.5%) aged 18 to 24, 33 people (18.8%) aged 25 to 44, 46 people (26.1%) aged 45 to 64, and 49 people (27.8%) who were 65 years of age or older. The median age was 50.5 years. There were 89 males and 87 females.

There were 93 housing units at an average density of 29.7 units per square mile (11.5 units/km^{2}), of which 82 (88.2%) were occupied. Of these, 69 (84.1%) were owner-occupied, and 13 (15.9%) were occupied by renters.

== Politics ==
In the state legislature, Nicolaus is in the 1st senatorial district, represented by Republican Megan Dahle, and in the 3rd Assembly district, represented by Vacant.

Federally, Nicolaus is in California's 1st congressional district, represented by Republican James Gallagher.
