= U.S. Route 99 in California =

Former section of U.S. Highway in California, United States

U.S. Route 99
- Pacific Highway; Golden State Highway

Route information
- Maintained by Caltrans
- Length: 754 mi (1,213 km)
- Existed: 1926–1972

Major junctions
- South end: Fed. 5 at Mexican border in Calexico
- US 80 in El Centro; US 60 from Indio to Beaumont, and Pomona to Los Angeles; US 70 from Indio to Los Angeles; US 6 / US 66 / US 101 in Los Angeles; US 399 / US 466 in Bakersfield; US 50 from French Camp to Sacramento; US 40 from Davis to Roseville; US 299 in Redding
- North end: US 99 at the Oregon state line

Location
- Country: United States
- State: California
- Counties: Imperial, Riverside, San Bernardino, Los Angeles, Kern, Tulare, Fresno, Madera, Merced, Stanislaus, San Joaquin, Sacramento; Tehama, Shasta, Siskiyou

Highway system
- United States Numbered Highway System; List; Special; Divided; State highways in California; Interstate; US; State; Scenic; History; Pre‑1964; Unconstructed; Deleted; Freeways
← SR 98	→ SR 99

U.S. Route 99 (US 99) was the main north–south United States Numbered Highway on the West Coast of the United States until 1964, running from Calexico, California, on the Mexican border to Blaine, Washington, on the Canadian border. Known also as the "Golden State Highway" and "The Main Street of California", US 99 was an important route in California throughout much of the 1930s as a route for Dust Bowl immigrant farm workers to traverse the state. It was assigned in 1926 and existed until it was replaced for the most part by Interstate 5 (I-5). A large section in the Central Valley is now State Route 99 (SR 99).

== Route description ==
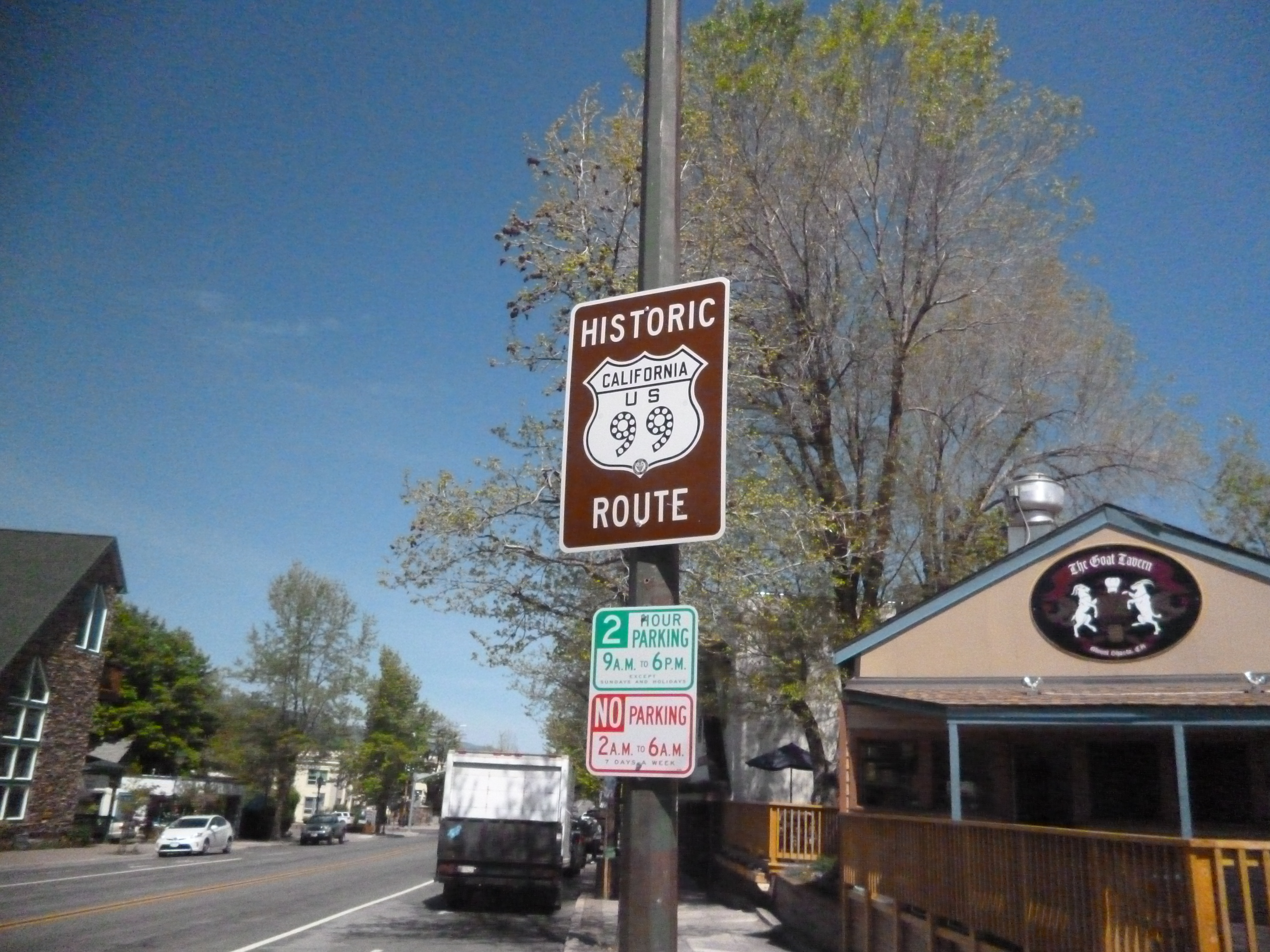
Historic US 99 Marker in Mount Shasta City

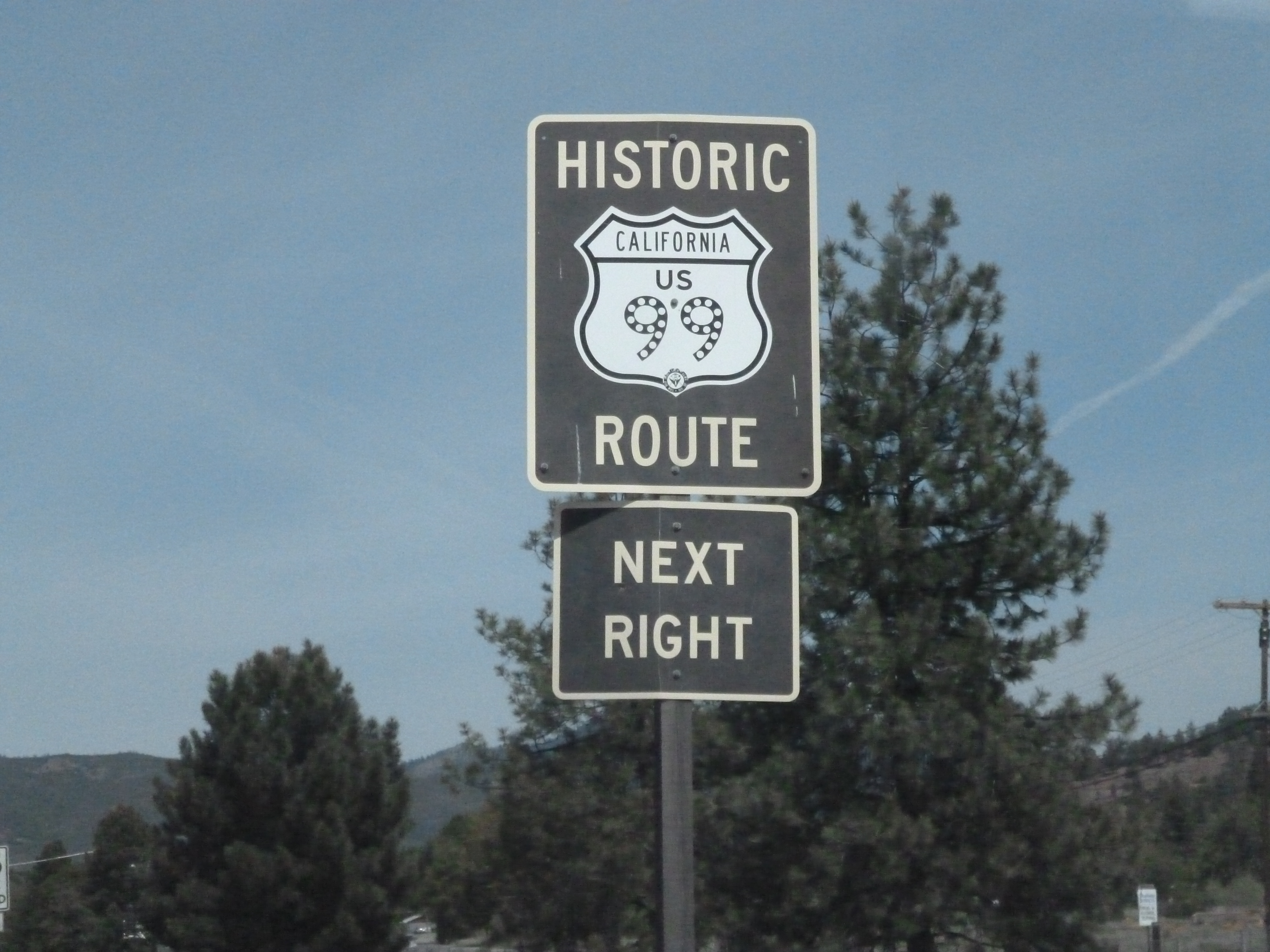
Historic US 99 Marker on I-5 in Yreka, California

=== Mexico to Los Angeles ===
The highway started at the border with Baja California in Calexico, California. It then continued north along the western shore of the Salton Sea. The stretch is now known as SR 86. US 99 continued along present-day SR 111 through Coachella to its intersection at Dillon Road with another major US route signed as both US 60 and US 70.

Now signed as US 60/US 70/US 99, the highway continued north through Indio and turned west through the San Gorgonio Pass toward Los Angeles paralleling the route of modern I-10. In Beaumont, US 60 split off on its own westward trek to Los Angeles. The highway through Banning and Beaumont (known as Ramsey Street in Banning and Sixth Street in Beaumont) was bypassed by the new superhighway version of US 60/US 70/US 99 that would later become part of I-10. The edges of the old US 60 shield at the replacement interchange's overhead sign at one point were visible underneath the SR 60 shield that covers it; however, in 2020, the sign was removed in exchange for a modern retroreflective sign. Prior to the construction of the superhighway, US 99 entered Los Angeles on Valley Boulevard, multiplexed with US 70.

US 70 ended in downtown LA while US 99 turned north once again more or less following the route of today's I-5 (San Fernando Road in the San Fernando Valley before the construction of I-5), up and over the Tehachapi Mountains to the San Joaquin Valley. US 99's original alignment over the rugged Tehachapi Mountains was known in its earliest days as the Ridge Route, the first highway directly linking the Los Angeles Basin to the San Joaquin Valley. Built in 1915, the alignment between Castaic and SR 138 to Gorman is listed on the National Register of Historic Places. The original Ridge Route at the south and the Grapevine at the north was an exceptionally twisty and narrow two-lane concrete road that was very slow to travel along the ridge precipices and was considered dangerous to drive in the days of the Model A Ford and overheating trucks. It was bypassed in 1933 by the three-lane "Alternate Ridge Route", some of which now sits at the bottom of Pyramid Lake. Dropping down from the Tehachapis, US 99 entered the San Joaquin Valley at the bottom of the steep Grapevine grade (the foot of the Tejon Pass) and continued north.

=== Los Angeles ===
When it was first designated in late 1926, US 99 ran with US 66 from San Bernardino via Pasadena to Los Angeles, turning north there to San Fernando. The route was signed in 1928. This alignment remained through 1933, but by 1942 it had moved to its own alignment (concurrent with US 70, as well as US 60 west of Pomona) from San Bernardino to Los Angeles. This alignment used Garvey Avenue from Pomona, turning onto Ramona Boulevard in Alhambra to reach Macy Street (now Cesar E. Chavez Avenue) near downtown Los Angeles. It turned north at Figueroa Street, running through the Figueroa Street Tunnels and turning off at Avenue 26 to reach San Fernando Road. When the San Bernardino Freeway, Santa Ana Freeway and Pasadena Freeway were completed, it was routed onto them, continuing to exit at Avenue 26. In 1962, with the completion of the Golden State Freeway northeast of downtown, US 99 was moved onto it, bypassing the Santa Ana Freeway, Four Level Interchange and Figueroa Street Tunnels.

=== Los Angeles to Sacramento ===
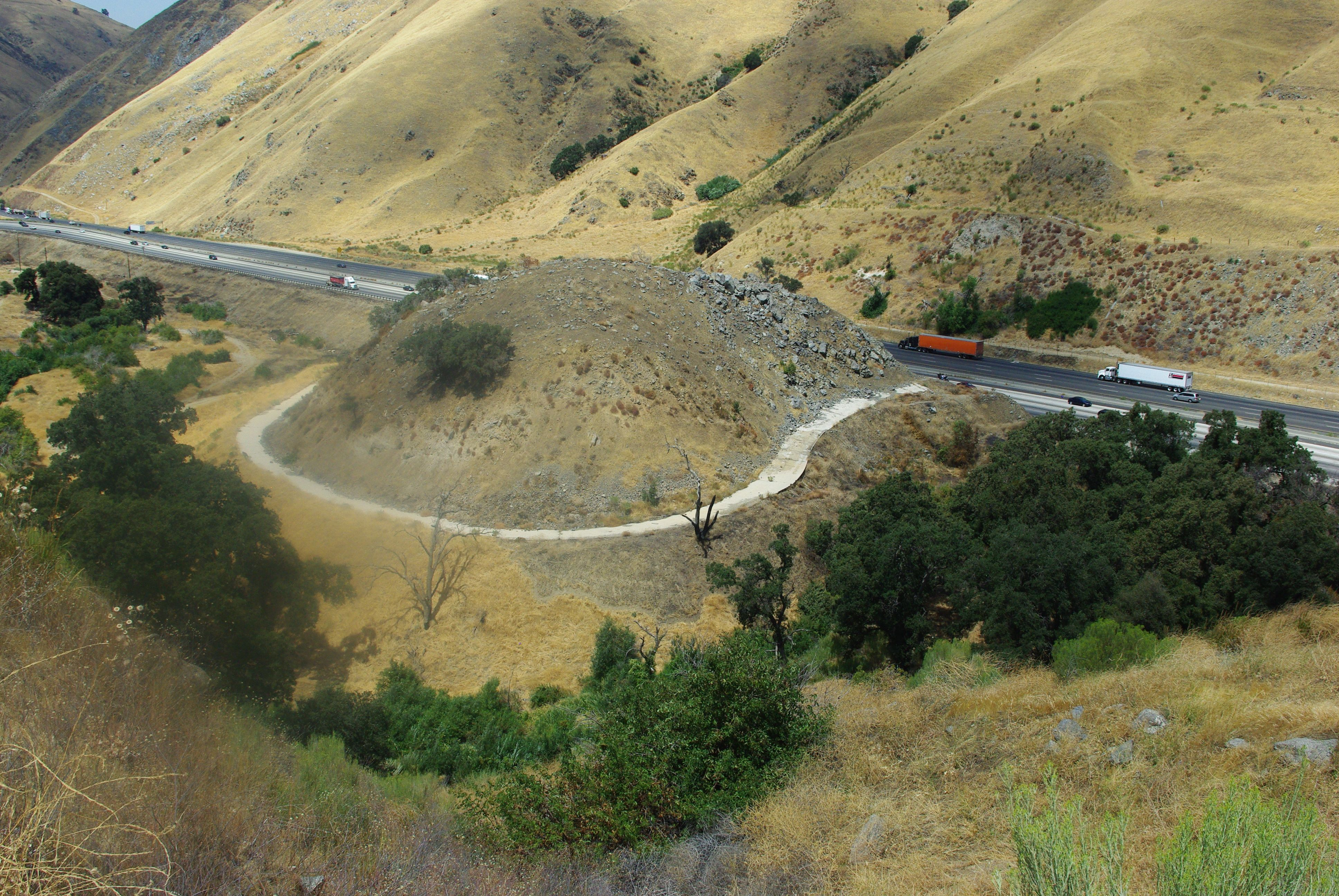
A section of the 1915 Ridge Route in Lebec, abandoned when US 99 (Ridge Route Alternate) opened over Tejon Pass in 1933

From Los Angeles US 99 followed San Fernando Road through Glendale and Burbank to Sylmar. From 1937 to 1964 it shared this routing with US 6; the remaining stretch of the highway through the Santa Clarita Valley is named "The Old Road". The Old Road starts near the Newhall Pass Interchange, just south of Santa Clarita, eventually crossing under present-day I-5. As the road now winds north, passing by Pico Canyon Road, it reaches McBean Parkway near the California Institute of the Arts, College of the Canyons and Six Flags Magic Mountain. In Castaic the Old Road becomes a suburban street and ends at Oak Hill Court, just outside Castaic. A substantial portion of the road is submerged beneath Pyramid Lake; the northern side is now the lake's public access road, while the southern side is access to the dam.

US 99 then headed over Tejon Pass to the San Joaquin Valley. Just north of the route's entry to the valley, I-5 splits off from US 99, and US 99 continued on most of the current route of SR 99, to Bakersfield, Fresno, and Sacramento, though much of SR 99 routing was freeways adjacent to the old route. Many older segments of the highway between the "Grapevine" and Sacramento still exist as local streets, many of them having "Golden State" in their names (such as Golden State Avenue, Golden State Boulevard, Golden State Highway). In Sacramento, the U.S. 99 routing ran north along what is now Stockton Boulevard to Broadway, west to 16th Street, north on 16th to L Street, and L/M Streets west out of town co-signed with U.S. Route 40.

=== Sacramento to Oregon ===
North of Sacramento, the route divided into US 99W and US 99E. US 99W co-routed with US 40 west to Davis, in the city as Olive Drive. The route continued as Richards Boulevard, 1st Street, B Street, and Russell Boulevard before turning north on what is now SR 113 into Woodland to meet and parallel I-5 near the town of Yolo. From there, the route parallels the current I-5, entering Corning from the south as Old Corning road, turning east onto Solano Street before turning north again on 3rd street continuing to Red Bluff, where it became Main Street. All of the old inter-town original roadway still exists, signed as 99W, CR 99 or CR 99W.

From Sacramento, US 99E followed I-80 (first the current business route, then the actual route) to Roseville, then north along SR 65 to Olivehurst, from where it followed SR 70 to Marysville. From Marysville, it followed SR 20 across the Feather River to Yuba City, then along the current SR 99 north to Red Bluff, where it rejoined 99W at Main Street and Antelope Boulevard.

From Red Bluff, US 99 continued north along the same route as I-5, except that it went through Redding along present SR 273. and SR 263 from Yreka to near Black Mountain.

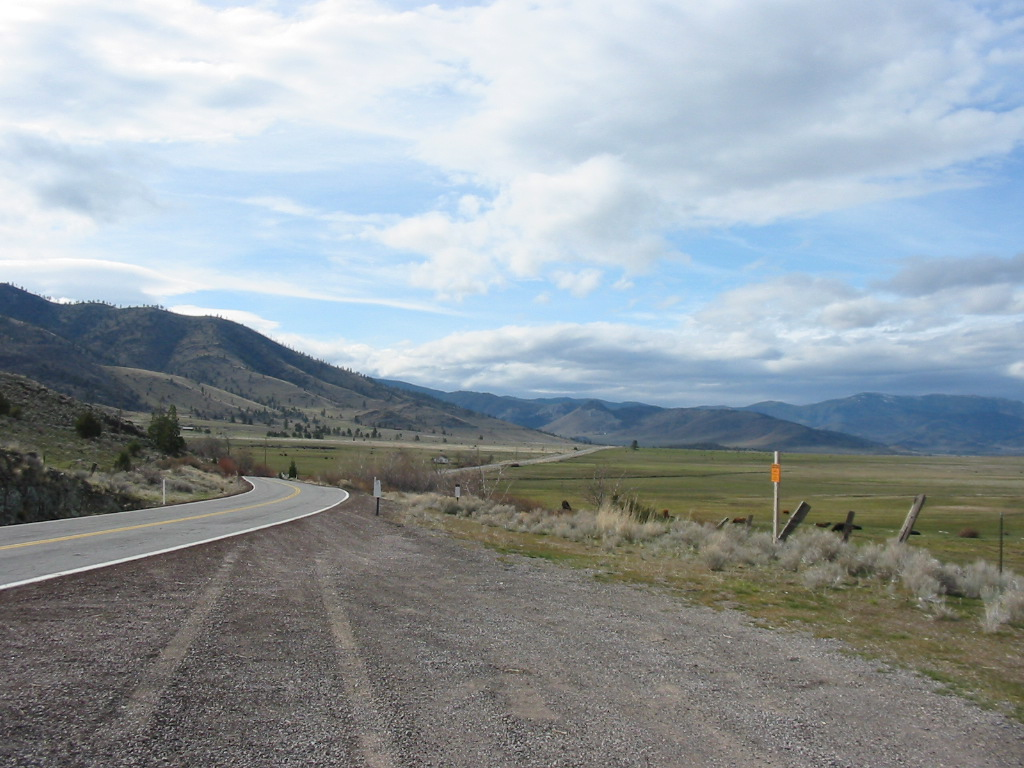
Old 99 Highway in Siskiyou County

From Redding, the highway went through the small town of Mountain Gate, before plunging into what is now Shasta Lake. In drought years, many of the old bridges, road cuts, and guardrail can be seen when the water in the lake recedes. After passing Shasta Lake, the highway had to be designed around very difficult terrain. The Sacramento River Canyon was a big task to overcome, but to this day, many bridges can still be found and visited, reminding us of how far our engineering has come. Once into Siskiyou County, the highway meanders through Dunsmuir, heading north to Mount Shasta, and from there, up to Weed. In Weed, the highway becomes SR 265 for a very short distance, before heading north towards the town of Gazelle.

A 22.7-mile-long (36.5 km) stretch of two-lane county road known as "Old Highway 99" exists in Siskiyou County, between Weed and Yreka, in the same form as it did when it was US 99. It roughly parallels I-5, but at one point diverges from it by a distance of several miles. Once north of Yreka, the highway becomes SR 263, merges with SR 96, and heads north to Hornbrook. Much of the old highway between Hornbrook and Oregon has been demolished or currently sits on private property.

== History ==
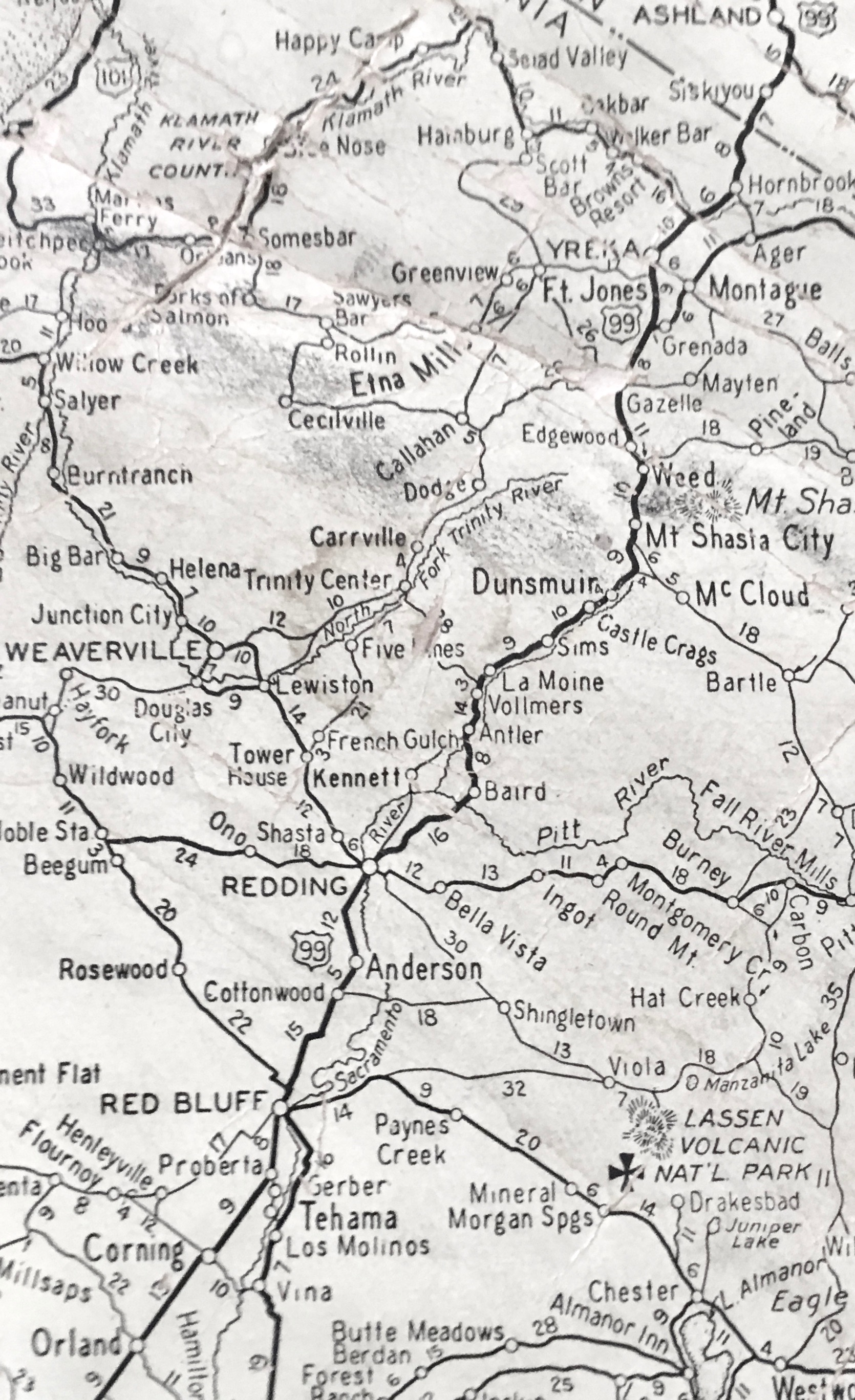
US 99 from Orland, CA to Ashland, OR in 1937

By 1925, the future Route 99 was 99% paved from Los Angeles to Sacramento; the rest of the state was finished about 1932. Sections were expanded to four lanes starting in the late 1930s and by 1961 Los Angeles to Sacramento was all four-lane, much of it being full freeway.

By 1968, US 99 was decommissioned with the completion of I-5 in Washington and California, but the highway's phasing out actually began July 1, 1964, thanks to the passage of Collier Senate Bill No. 64 on September 20, 1963. The bill launched a program to simplify California's complicated highway numbering system and eliminate concurrent postings like the aforementioned US 60/US 70/US 99. The highways that replaced it are:

- SR 111 and SR 86 between the Mexican border and Indio.
- I-10, replacing US 60 and US 70 between Indio and Los Angeles as well.
- US 101 and SR 110 in downtown Los Angeles.
- I-5 from north of downtown all the way to its modern-day split in Wheeler Ridge before US 99's final decommissioning in 1968.

The 424-mile (682 km) stretch between Wheeler Ridge and Red Bluff is signed as SR 99 which makes it California's second-longest state highway behind SR 1. However, the newly enacted Historic U.S. Route 99 extends from Indio starting from I-10 in the Coachella Valley all the way down the Imperial Valley to Calexico on the Mexican border with Mexicali, Baja California, Mexico.

== Major intersections ==
County	Location	mi	km	Destinations	Notes
United States–Mexico border		0	0.0	Fed. 5 – Mexicali	Continuation into Mexico
United States–Mexico border		0	0.0	Calexico Port of Entry	
Imperial	Calexico	1	1.6	SR 98 – Yuma, San Diego	
Imperial	Heber	5	8.0	SR 111 north – Brawley	
Imperial	El Centro	12	19	US 80 east (Main Street) – Yuma	Southern end of US 80 overlap
Imperial	El Centro	13	21	US 80 west (Adams Avenue) – San Diego	Northern end of US 80 overlap
Imperial	Brawley	26	42	To SR 111 (Main Street)	
Imperial		47	76	SR 78 west – Julian, Oceanside	
Riverside	Torres–Martinez Reservation	79	127	SR 195 east	
Riverside	Coachella	94	151	SR 111 south – Brawley	Southern end of SR 111 overlap
Riverside	Indio	95	153	US 60 east / US 70 east – Blythe, Phoenix	Southern end of US 60 and US 70 overlaps
Riverside	Indio	96	154	SR 74 west / SR 111 north	Northern end of SR 111 overlap
Riverside	Whitewater	126	203	SR 111 south – Palm Springs	
Riverside	Beaumont	144	232	US 60 west – Riverside	Northern end of US 60 overlap
San Bernardino	Colton	166	267	US 91 / US 395 / SR 18 – San Bernardino, Riverside	
Los Angeles	Pomona	195.5	314.6	SR 71 (Garey Avenue)	
Los Angeles	Pomona	197	317	US 60 east – Pomona	Southern end of US 60 overlap
Los Angeles	Rosemead	215.5	346.8	SR 19 (Rosemead Boulevard)	
Los Angeles	Monterey Park	219.5	353.3	SR 15 (Atlantic Boulevard)	
Los Angeles	Los Angeles	225	362	US 101 south (Boyle Avenue) US 60 east / US 70 east	National western termini of both US 60 and US 70; northern end of US 60 and US 70 overlaps; southern end of US 101 overlap
Los Angeles	Los Angeles	226.5	364.5	US 6 west (Figueroa Street) / US 66 west / US 101 north (Sunset Boulevard)	Northern end of US 101 overlap; southern end of US 6 and US 66 overlaps
Los Angeles	Los Angeles	228.5	367.7	US 66 east (Figueroa Street)	Northern end of US 66 overlap
Los Angeles	Los Angeles	231.5	372.6	SR 2 (Fletcher Drive)	
Los Angeles	Los Angeles	233	375	SR 134 east (Colorado Boulevard)	Southern end of SR 134 overlap
Los Angeles	Los Angeles	238.5	383.8	SR 134 west (Alameda Avenue)	Northern end of SR 134 overlap
Los Angeles	San Fernando	240.5	387.0	SR 118 east (Maclay Avenue)	
Los Angeles	Newhall	245	394	US 6 east – Palmdale, Lancaster	Northern end of US 6 overlap
Los Angeles	Castaic Junction	255	410	SR 126 west	
Los Angeles	Gorman	286	460	SR 138 east – Lancaster, Palmdale	
Kern		298	480	SR 166 west – Maricopa, Taft	
Kern	Panama	312	502	US 399 south – Taft, Ventura	
Kern	Bakersfield	320	510	US 466 east / SR 178 – Mojave	Southern end of US 466 overlap
Kern	Famoso	340	550	US 466 west – Wasco, Paso Robles	Northern end of US 466 overlap
Kern	Famoso	340	550	SR 65 north – Porterville	
Tulare	Tipton	372	599	SR 190 east – Tipton, Porterville	
Tulare	Visalia	391	629	SR 198 – Visalia, Hanford	
Fresno	Fresno	427	687	SR 41 – Lemoore, Yosemite, Paso Robles	
Fresno	Fresno	427	687	SR 180 – Mendota, Kings Canyon	
Madera	Fairmead	462	744	SR 152 west – Los Banos, Gilroy	
Merced	Merced	484	779	SR 140 east – Mariposa, Yosemite	Southern end of SR 140 overlap
Merced	Merced	484	779	SR 59	
Merced	Merced	485	781	SR 140 west	Northern end of SR 140 overlap
Stanislaus	Modesto	521	838	SR 132 east – Empire, Waterford	Southern end of SR 132 overlap
Stanislaus	Modesto	521	838	SR 132 west – Vernalis	Northern end of SR 132 overlap
San Joaquin	Manteca	538	866	SR 120 – Sonora, San Francisco	
San Joaquin	Stockton	551	887	US 50 west / SR 4 – Oakland, Berkeley, Angels Camp	Southern end of US 50 overlap
San Joaquin	Stockton	552	888	SR 8 east – Linden	
San Joaquin	Stockton	553	890	SR 88 north – Jackson	
San Joaquin	Lodi	563	906	SR 12 – Fairfield	
Sacramento	Galt	577	929	SR 104 east – Jackson	
Sacramento	Sacramento	599	964	US 50 east / SR 16 east – Woodland, Jackson, Lake Tahoe	Northern end of US 50 overlap; southern end of SR 16 overlap
Sacramento	Sacramento	599	964	US 40 east / US 99E north – Yuba City, Marysville, Reno US 40 west / US 99W north / SR 16 west – Woodland, Redding, San Francisco	US 99 splits into US 99E and US 99W
See US 99E and US 99W
Tehama	Red Bluff	599	964	US 99E south / SR 36 east – Chico US 99W south – Sacramento	US 99E and US 99W join to form US 99; southern end of SR 36 overlap
Tehama	Red Bluff	600	970	SR 36 west – Fortuna	Northern end of SR 36 overlap
Shasta	Redding	630	1,010	US 299 west / SR 44 east – Eureka, Susanville	Southern end of US 299 overlap
Shasta	Redding	632	1,017	US 299 east – Burney, Alturas	Northern end of US 299 overlap
Siskiyou	Mount Shasta	693	1,115	SR 89 south – McCloud	
Siskiyou	Weed	704	1,133	US 97 north – Klamath Falls	
Siskiyou		742	1,194	SR 96 west – Willow Creek	
Siskiyou Pass		754	1,213	Siskiyou Summit, elevation 4,466 ft (1,361 m); California–Oregon state line	
Siskiyou Pass		754	1,213	US 99 north – Grants Pass	Continuation into Oregon
1.000 mi = 1.609 km; 1.000 km = 0.621 mi: Concurrency terminus; Route transition

== Suffixed routes ==
U.S. Route 99W
- Location: Central Valley to Stockton
- Existed: 1929–1933

U.S. Route 99E
- Location: Central Valley to Stockton
- Existed: 1929–1933

U.S. Route 99W was a short-lived alternate of US 99 in the Central Valley of California, running from north of Manteca via French Camp to Stockton. At the same time, from roughly 1929 to 1933, U.S. Route 99E ran to the east, having the same termini as US 99W.

US 99W ran along French Camp Road and El Dorado Street, while US 99E used present SR 99 and Mariposa Road. The northern end of each in Stockton is unclear; it may have been at Charter Way and Wilson Way or at Harding Way and Wilson Way.

Prior to the establishment of the United States Numbered Highways in 1926, the main Los Angeles-Sacramento route, pre-1964 Legislative Route 4, ran from Manteca to Stockton via French Camp (later US 99W). At French Camp, pre-1964 Legislative Route 5 split to the southwest to reach the San Francisco Bay Area via Altamont Pass. The Lincoln Highway used Route 4 from Sacramento to French Camp and Route 5 over Altamont Pass.

In November 1926, Route 4 was defined as part of US 99 and Route 5 (to San Jose) became US 48. California's U.S. Routes were not marked until 1928, and US 99 had not yet been split into US 99E and US 99W.

Around 1929, Route 4 was realigned between north of Manteca and Stockton. This became US 99E, and the old route became US 99W. Route 5 was extended north from French Camp to Stockton, but US 48 continued to end at US 99W. US 48 became an extension of US 50 c. 1931, running concurrently with US 99 from Sacramento to Stockton and US 99W to French Camp. Around 1933, US 99W was dropped, and US 99E became part of US 99. Most of former US 99E is now part of SR 99 but former US 99W has been bypassed by I-5.

=== US 99E major intersections ===
County	Location	mi	km	Destinations	Notes
Sacramento	Sacramento	0	0.0	US 99 south – Stockton US 40 west / US 99W north / SR 16 west – San Francisco	Southern end of US 40 overlap; northern end of SR 16 overlap
Placer	Roseville	18	29	US 40 east – Reno	Northern end of US 40 overlap
Yuba	Marysville	52	84	SR 20 east / SR 24 north	Southern end of SR 20 and SR 24 overlaps
Sutter	Yuba City	54	87	SR 20 west / SR 24 south	Northern end of SR 20 and SR 24 overlaps
Butte	Chico	101	163	SR 32 – Orland, Chester	
Tehama	Red Bluff	138	222	SR 36 east – Susanville	Southern end of SR 36 overlap
Tehama	Red Bluff	141	227	US 99 north / SR 36 west – Redding US 99W south – Sacramento	Northern end of SR 36 overlap
1.000 mi = 1.609 km; 1.000 km = 0.621 mi: Concurrency terminus

=== US 99W major intersections ===
County	Location	mi	km	Destinations	Notes
Sacramento	Sacramento	0	0.0	US 99 south / SR 16 east – Stockton US 40 east / US 99E north – Reno	Southern end of US 40 overlap
Sacramento	Sacramento	0	0.0	SR 16 north / SR 24 – Woodland, Isleton	Northern end of SR 16 overlap
Yolo	Davis	14	23	US 40 west – San Francisco	Northern end of US 40 overlap
Yolo	Woodland	26	42	SR 16 east / SR 24 – Sacramento, Marysville	Southern end of SR 16 overlap
Yolo	Woodland	28	45	SR 16 west – Madison	Northern end of SR 16 overlap
Colusa	Williams	66	106	SR 20 – Colusa, Clear Lake	
Glenn	Orland	108	174	SR 32 east – Chico	
Tehama	Red Bluff	139	224	US 99 north / SR 36 west – Redding US 99E south / SR 36 east – Chico	
1.000 mi = 1.609 km; 1.000 km = 0.621 mi: Concurrency terminus
