= List of U.S. Routes in California =

U.S. Routes in California
- Highway shields for US 6, US 95, and US 101
- U.S. Routes highlighted in red

System information
- Maintained by Caltrans
- Length: 1,721.644 mi (2,770.717 km)
- Formed: November 11, 1926

Highway names
- US Highways: U.S. Route XX (US XX)
- Special Routes: U.S. Route XX Alternate (US XX Alt.); U.S. Route XX Business (US XX Bus.); U.S. Route XX Bypass (US XX Byp.); U.S. Route XX Temporary (US XX Temp.)

System links
- State highways in California; Interstate; US; State; Scenic; History; Pre‑1964; Unconstructed; Deleted; Freeways

This is a list of U.S. Routes in the U.S. state of California. It includes routes defined by the California State Legislature but never built, as well as routes entirely relinquished to local governments. It also includes the routes that were decommissioned during the 1964 state highway renumbering.

Each U.S. Route in California is maintained by the California Department of Transportation (Caltrans) and is assigned a Route (officially State Highway Route) number in the Streets and Highways Code (Sections 300-635). Under the code, the state assigns a unique Route X to each highway and does not differentiate between state, US, or Interstate highways.

California has been using a version of the 1961 U.S. Route shield, featuring a simplified cutout shield containing only the outer border, "U S," and the route marker. All other U.S. states adopted the 1971 version of the marker, consisting of a white shield outline on a black square background. However, according to the 2026 MUTCD revision in Figure 2D, it appears Caltrans will begin using the 1971 design to comply with the FHWA. These have begun to appear in the Fix50 project in Sacramento and will appear during any future U.S. Route improvements in the state.

== Mainline routes ==
- Interstate Highways and state highways that traverse California are also defined in the California Streets and Highways code as state routes. This list does not include these state routes as they are listed separately.
- The years listed reflect when the route was affected by legislative action, this is not necessarily the same year as the actual construction or signing changes to the route.
- Concurrencies are not explicitly codified in the Streets and Highways Code; such highway segments are listed on only one of the corresponding legislative route numbers. For example, the I-10/US 95 concurrency between Blythe and the Arizona state line is only listed under Route 10 in the highway code while the definition of Route 95 omits the fact that it does connect to Arizona. When a highway is broken into such segments, the total length recorded by Caltrans only reflects those non-contiguous segments and does not include those overlaps that would be required to make the route continuous. Furthermore, Caltrans may not sign all concurrencies, and instead may only post the highway shields for the route with the contiguous segment in the code.
- Some highways are not contiguous as the state has relinquished control of small sections to local governments. The stated length of the highway may or may not reflect the portions under local control.

Number	Length (mi) (Note: Lengths rounded to the nearest mile or tenth-mile are estimated from various sources including Google Maps.)	Length (km)	Southern or western terminus	Northern or eastern terminus	Formed	Removed	Notes
US 6	40.505	65.186	US 395 in Bishop	US 6 at the Nevada state line	1937	current	Until 1964 western terminus was in Long Beach
US 40	—	—	US 101 in San Francisco	US 40 at the Nevada state line	1926	1964	Replaced by I-80
US 48	87.3	140.5	US 101 in San Jose	French Camp Road in French Camp	1926	1931	Renumbered as US 50
US 50	108.624	174.813	I-80 in West Sacramento	US 50 at the Nevada state line	1926	current	Until 1964 western terminus was in San Francisco
US 60	255	410	I-5 and former US 99 in Los Angeles	US 60 / US 70 at the Arizona state line	1926	1972	Replaced by I-10; ran concurrently with US 70
US 66	315	507	SR 1 and former US 101 Alt. in Santa Monica	US 66 at the Arizona state line	1926	1969	Replaced by I-40 and other routes
US 70	255	410	I-5 and former US 99 in Los Angeles	US 60 / US 70 at the Arizona state line	1926	1964	Replaced by I-10; ran concurrently with US 60
US 80	176.53	284.10	I-5 and former US 101 in San Diego	US 80 at the Arizona state line	1926	1964	Replaced by I-8
US 91	—	—	SR 1 and former US 101 Alt. in Long Beach	US 91 / US 466 Nevada state line	1926	1971	Replaced by I-15 and SR 91
US 95	116.721 (Note: This route is broken into pieces, and the length does not reflect the overlaps that would be required to make the route continuous.)	187.844	I-10 / US 95 at the Arizona state line	US 95 at the Nevada state line	1930	current	
US 97	54.364	87.490	I-5 in Weed	US 97 at the Oregon state line	1935	current	
US 99	754	1,213	Fed. 5 near Calexico	US 99 at the Oregon state line	1926	1964	Replaced by I-5; completely decommissioned in 1972
US 99E	141	227	SR 99 and former US 99 in Wheeler Ridge	SR 99 and former US 99 in Sacramento	1929	1933	Most of former US 99E is now part of SR 99
US 99W	—	—	SR 99 and former US 99 in Wheeler Ridge	SR 99 and former US 99 in Sacramento	1929	1964	Replaced by majority of I-5
US 101	808.111	1,300.529	I-5 / I-10 / SR 60 in Los Angeles	US 101 at the Oregon state line	1926	current	Segment across the Golden Gate Bridge is not officially recognized as part of the state highway system; until 1964 southern terminus was in San Diego
US 101W	—	—	I-880 and US 101	I-580 and US 101	1929	1940	Reverted to US 101 after US 101E was decommissioned
US 101E	—	—	US 101	US 101	1929	1940	Renumbered into SR 17
US 199	36.41	58.60	US 101 near Crescent City	US 199 at the Oregon state line	1926	current	
US 299	304	489	US 101 in Arcata	US 395 in Alturas	1934	1964	Replaced by the majority of SR 299
US 395	556.909	896.258	I-15 near Hesperia US 395 at the Nevada state line	US 395 at the Nevada state line US 395 at the Oregon state line	1979	current	Split into two segments, as the highway clips into Nevada to serve Carson City and Reno; until 1969 southern terminus was in San Diego
US 399	137	220	US 101 in Ventura	SR 99 and former US 99 in Bakersfield	1934	1964	Replaced by SR 33 and SR 119
US 466	526	847	SR 1 in Morro Bay	US 91 / US 466 at the Nevada state line	1935	1965	Replaced by SR 58 and I-15; ran concurrently with former US 91
Former

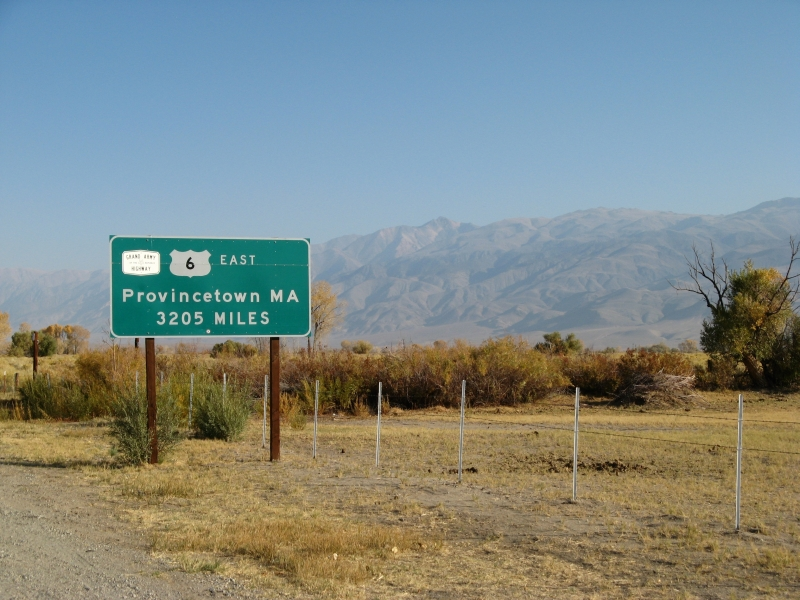
Road sign on US 6 showing that it is 3205 miles to its eastern end in Provincetown, Massachusetts

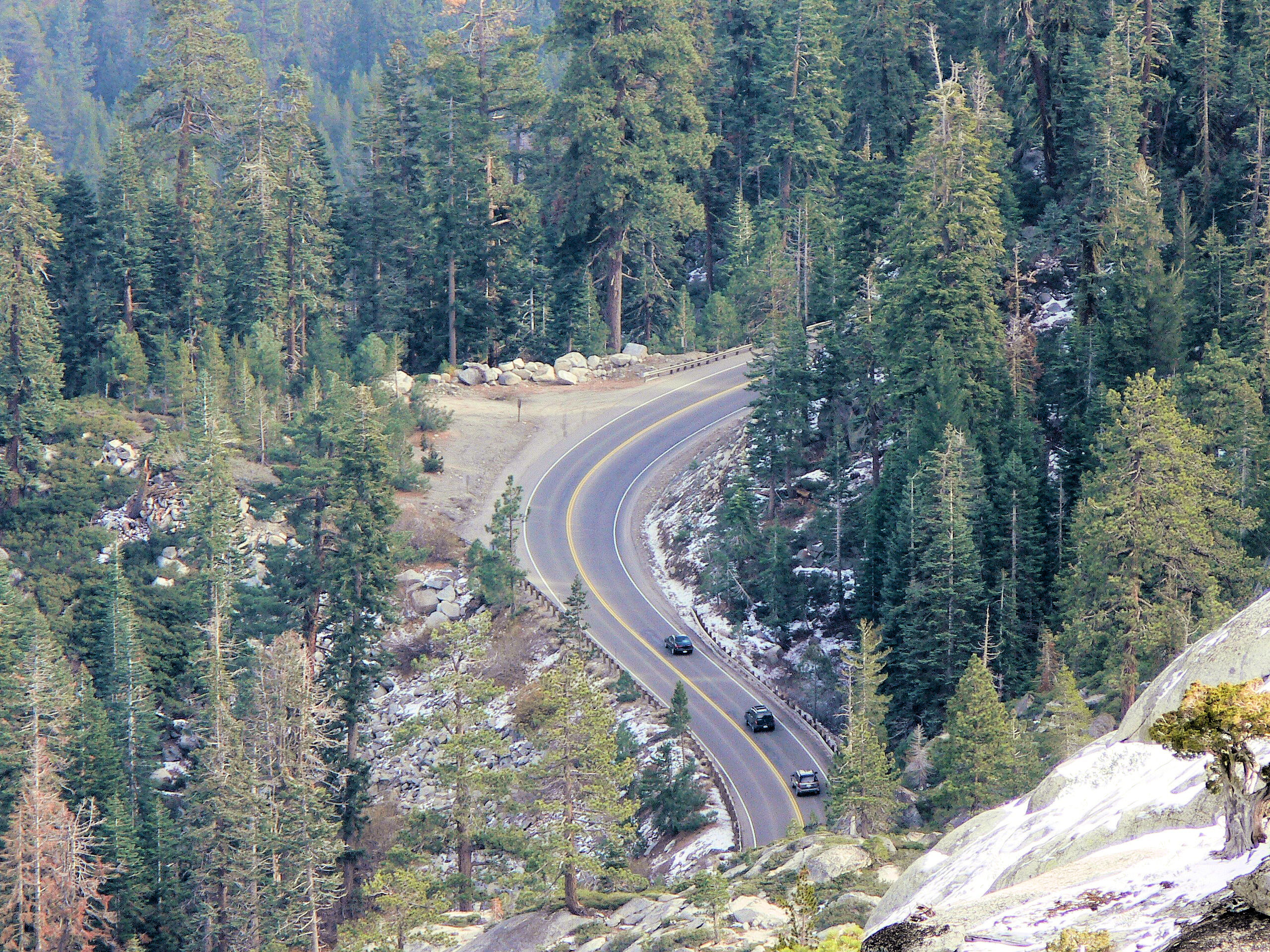
US 50 westbound as it winds down Echo Summit towards the west

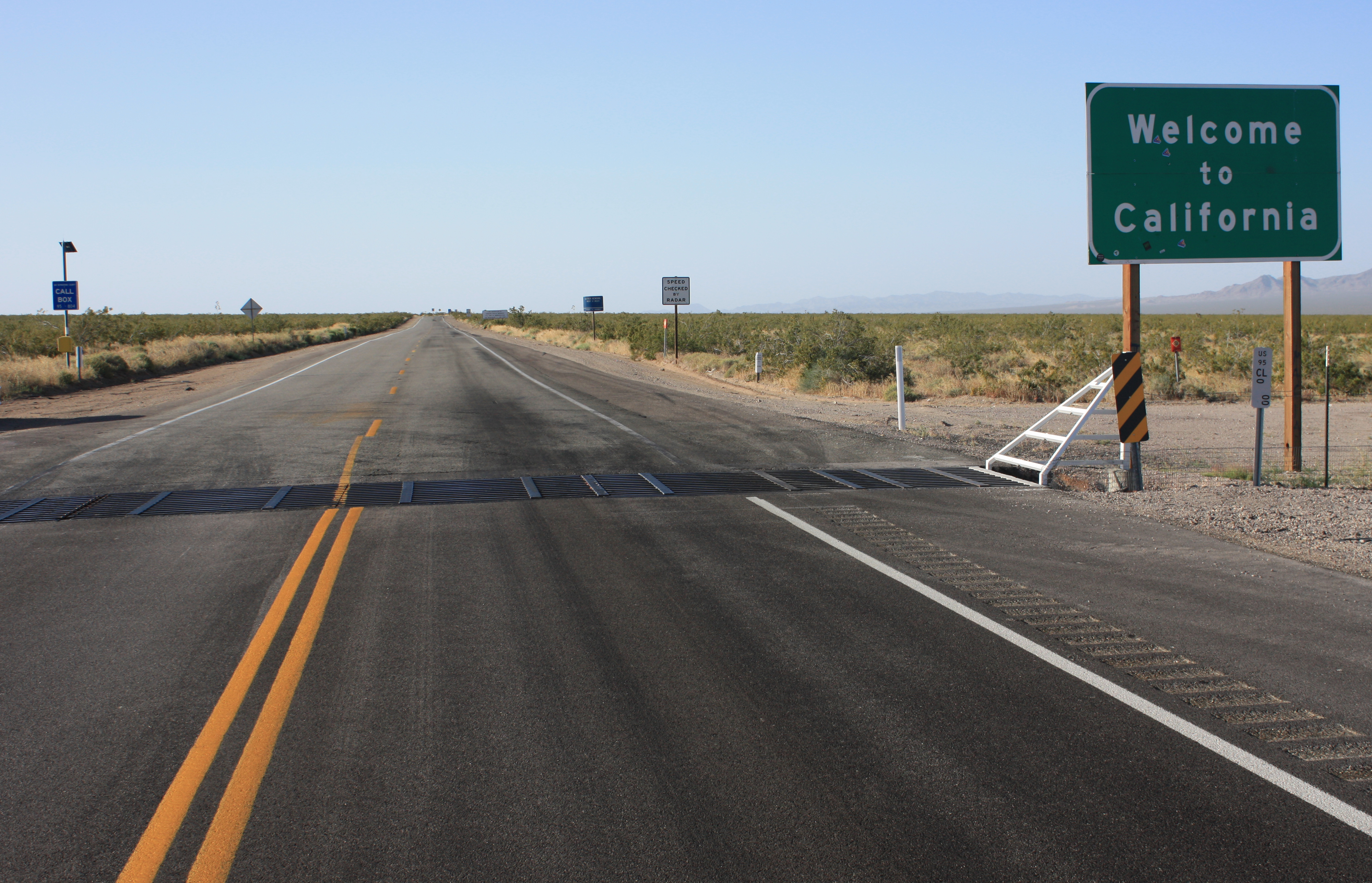
US 95 southbound at the California-Nevada state line

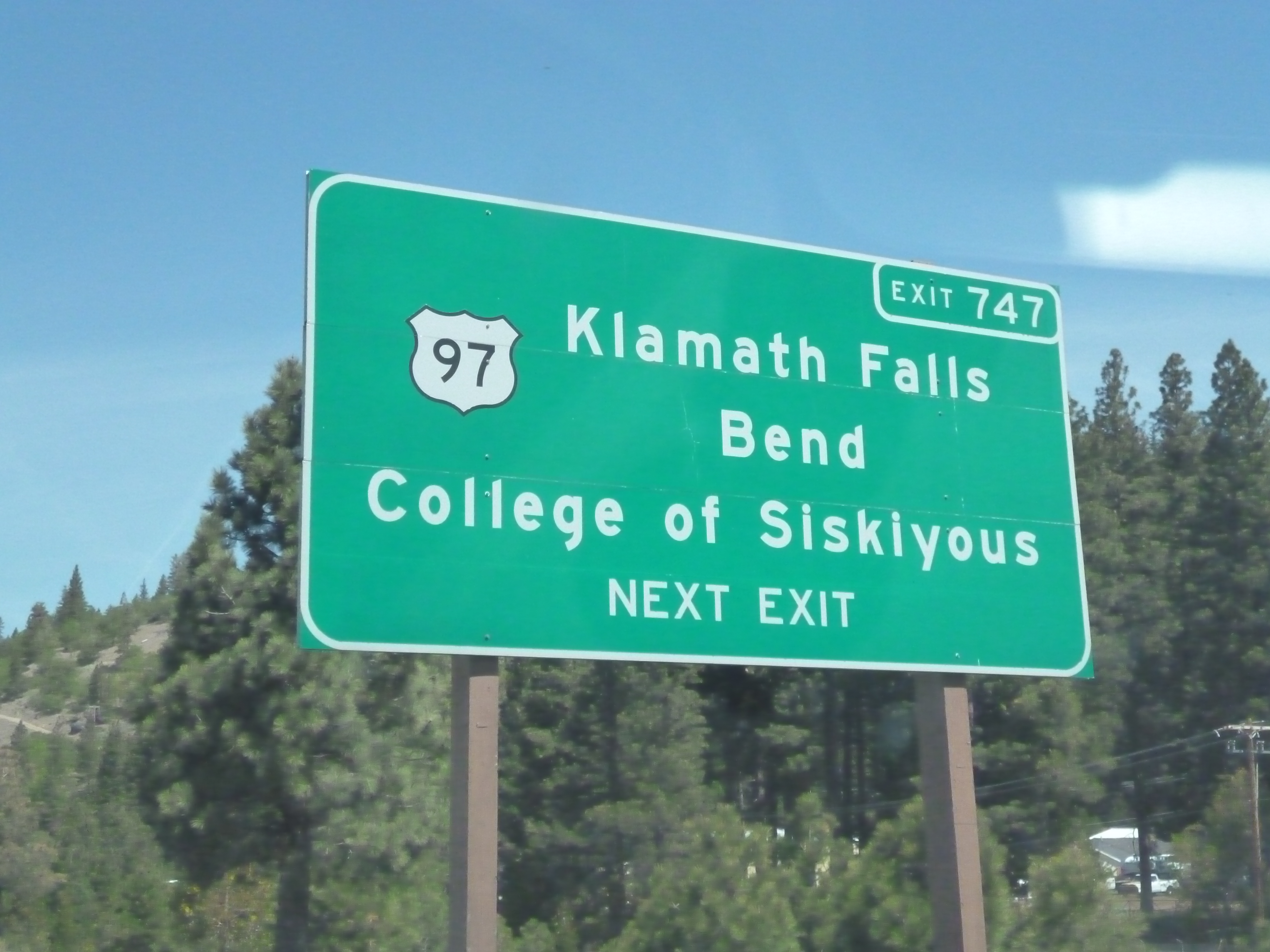
US 97 sign on I-5 in the City of Weed

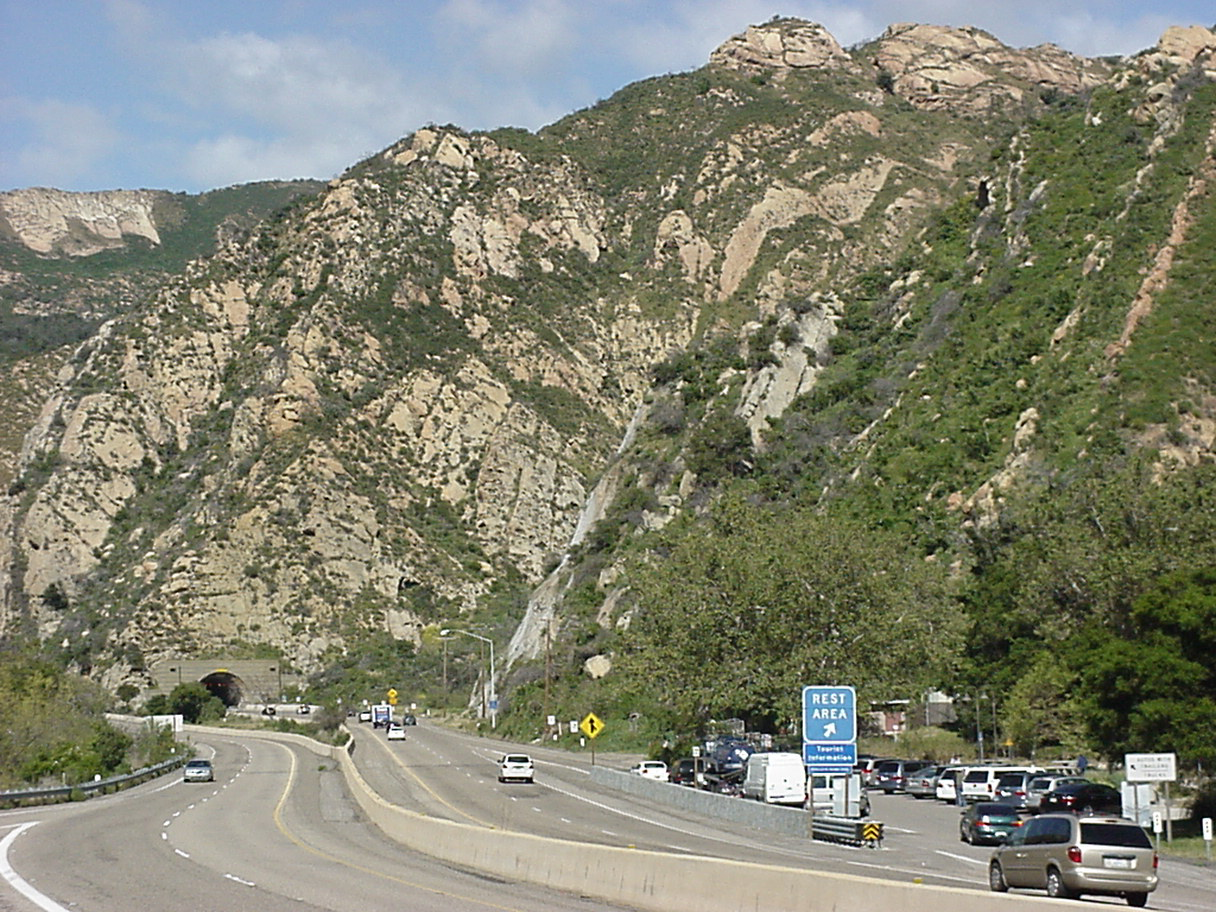
US 101 northbound approaching Gaviota Tunnel through the Santa Ynez Mountains

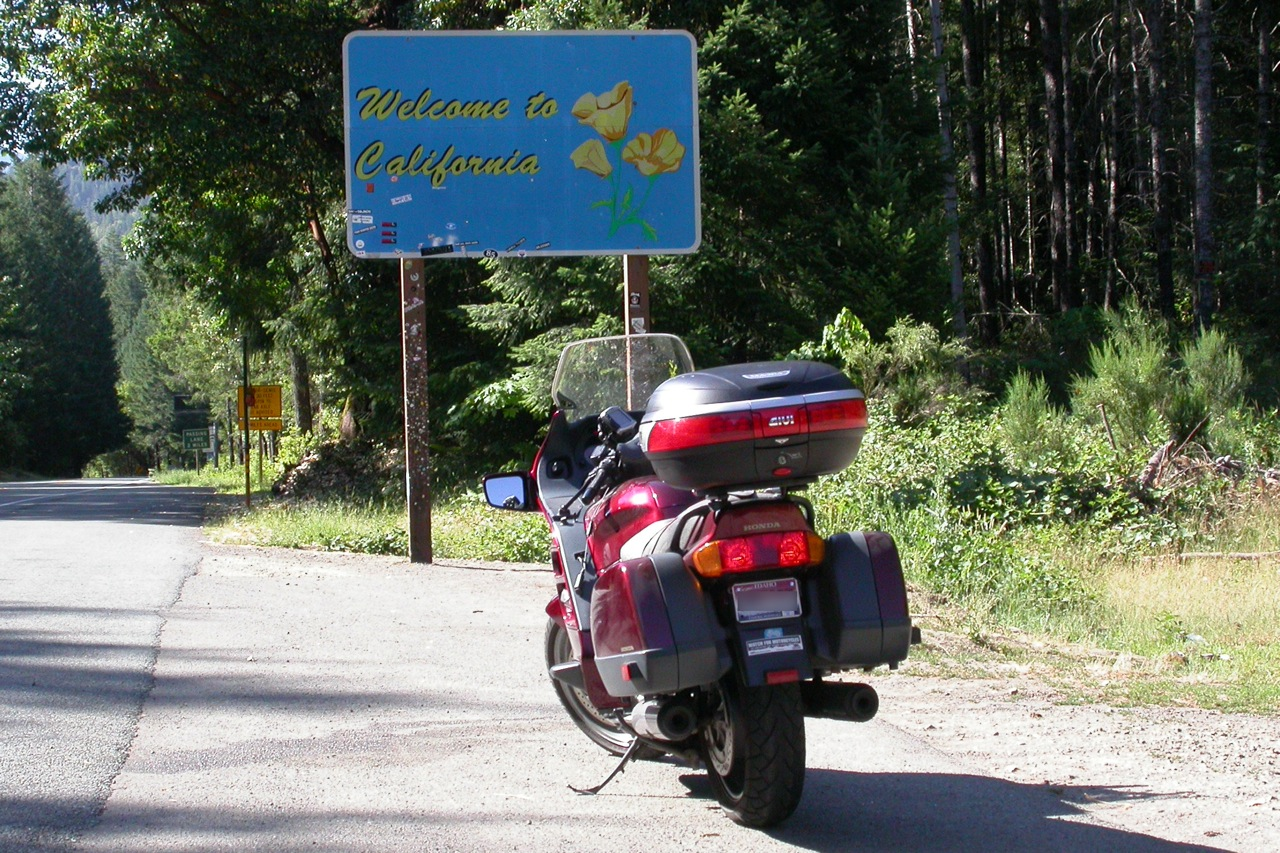
US 199 southbound at the California-Oregon state line

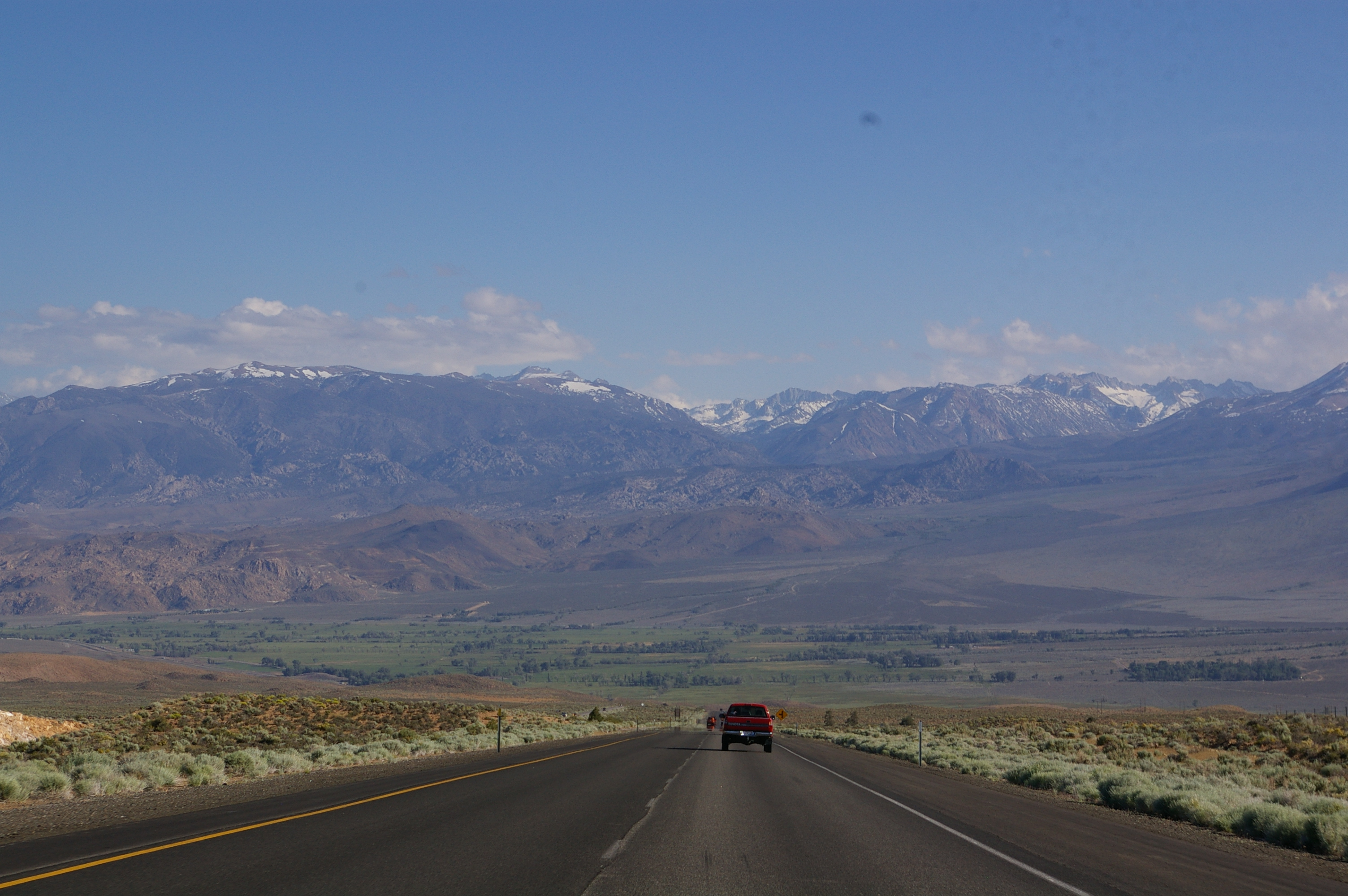
US 395 southbound descending into Owens Valley from the Sierra Nevada, just north of Bishop

== Special routes ==
Business routes in California are assigned by the California Department of Transportation (Caltrans), but are not maintained by Caltrans unless they overlay other routes of the state highway system. Local authorities may request route assignment from the Caltrans Transportation System Information Program, and all requests require approval of the executive committee of the American Association of State Highway and Transportation Officials (AASHTO).

Number	Length (mi)	Length (km)	Southern or western terminus	Northern or eastern terminus	Formed	Removed	Notes
US 40 Bus.	—	—	Oakland	Berkeley	—	—	
US 40 Temp.	—	—	American Canyon	Cordelia	—	—	
US 40 Bus.	—	—	—	—	—	—	Served West Sacramento
US 40 Bus.	—	—	—	—	—	—	Served North Sacramento
US 40 Alt.	—	—	Davis, California	California-Nevada state line	—	—	
US 50 Bus.	—	—	—	—	—	—	Served Oakland
US 50 Bus.	—	—	—	—	—	—	Served Sacramento
US 50 Alt.	—	—	Pollock Pines	South Lake Tahoe, California	—	—	Unofficial route that is activated and deactivated on multiple occasions when the main route of US 50 is closed due to flooding in the American River canyon
US 60 Bus.	—	—	—	—	—	—	Served Riverside
US 60 Bus.	—	—	—	—	—	—	Served Banning
US 66 Alt.	—	—	Los Angeles	Pasadena	—	—	
US 66 Bus.	—	—	—	—	—	—	Served San Bernardino
City US 66	—	—	—	—	—	—	Served San Bernardino
US 70 Bus.	—	—	—	—	—	—	Served Pomona
US 70 Bus.	—	—	—	—	—	—	Served Banning
US 80 Bus.	—	—	—	—	—	—	Served San Diego
US 80 Bus.	—	—	Winterhaven	Arizona-California state line	—	—	
US 91 Bus.	—	—	Corona	Riverside	—	—	
US 91 Bus.	—	—	Colton	San Bernardino	—	—	
US 91 Bus.	—	—	—	—	—	—	Served Victorville
US 99 Bus.	—	—	—	—	—	—	Served Banning
US 99 Bus.	—	—	—	—	—	—	Served Pomona
US 99 Bus.	—	—	Elysian Park	Sylmar	—	—	
US 99 Bus.	—	—	—	—	—	—	Served Fresno
US 99 Bus.	—	—	—	—	—	—	Served Merced
US 99 Bus.	—	—	—	—	—	—	Served Atwater
US 99 Alt.	—	—	Sacramento	Red Bluff	—	—	
US 99 Bus.	—	—	—	—	—	—	Served Sacramento
US 101 Bus.	—	—	Chula Vista	National City	—	—	
US 101 Bus.	—	—	—	—	—	—	Served San Diego
US 101 Alt.	—	—	Capistrano Beach	Oxnard	1936	1964	Now part of SR 1
US 101 Bus.	—	—	—	—	—	—	Served Buena Park
US 101 Bus.	—	—	—	—	—	—	Served Anaheim
US 101 Alt.	—	—	—	—	1936	1964	Served Long Beach; now part of SR 1
US 101 Bus.	—	—	—	—	—	—	Served Los Angeles
US 101 Byp.	—	—	Anaheim	Los Angeles	—	—	The precursor to the Santa Ana Freeway
US 101 Alt.	—	—	—	—	1936	1964	Served Santa Monica; now part of SR 1
US 101 Bus.	—	—	Universal City	Woodland Hills	—	—	
US 101 Bus.	—	—	—	—	—	—	Serves Ventura
US 101 Bus.	—	—	—	—	—	—	Serves Santa Maria
US 101 Bus.	—	—	—	—	—	—	Serves Arroyo Grande
US 101 Bus.	—	—	—	—	—	—	Serves Paso Robles
US 101 Bus.	—	—	—	—	—	—	Serves King City
US 101 Bus.	—	—	—	—	—	—	Serves Greenfield
US 101 Bus.	—	—	—	—	—	—	Serves Soledad
US 101 Bus.	—	—	—	—	—	—	Serves Gonzales
US 101 Bus.	—	—	—	—	—	—	Serves Salinas
US 101 Bus.	—	—	Gilroy	San Jose	—	—	
US 101 Byp.	—	—	San Jose	San Francisco	1939	1964	The Bayshore Freeway, now part of the main route of US 101
US 101 Alt.	—	—	—	—	—	—	Served San Francisco; now part of SR 82
US 101 Bus.	—	—	—	—	—	—	Serves Novato
US 101 Bus.	—	—	—	—	—	—	Serves Petaluma
US 101 Bus.	—	—	—	—	—	—	Serves Santa Rosa
US 101 Bus.	—	—	—	—	—	—	Serves Cloverdale
US 101 Bus.	—	—	—	—	—	—	Serves Ukiah
US 101 Bus.	—	—	—	—	—	—	Serves Rio Dell; southernmost segment carries the unsigned SR 283 designation
US 101 Bus.	—	—	—	—	—	—	Serves Fortuna
US 101 Bus.	—	—	—	—	—	—	Serves McKinleyville
US 395 Bus.	—	—	—	—	—	—	Served Riverside
US 395 Bus.	—	—	Colton	San Bernardino	—	—	
US 395 Bus.	—	—	—	—	—	—	Serves Ridgecrest
Former
