= Panama (disambiguation) =

Panama (or Panamá) is a republic in Central America.

Panama may also refer to:

== Geography and places ==
=== Republic of Panama ===
- Isthmus of Panama, the isthmus on which the country is located
  - Panama Canal, a canal through the isthmus
  - Gulf of Panama, a bay south of the isthmus
- Panamá Province, one of that country's component provinces
  - Panamá District, one of the districts in the Province
    - Panama City, the capital of the Republic, the Province and the District
      - Panamá Viejo, the oldest part of the city
- Panamá Oeste Province, a new province created from the original Panamá Province

==== Pre-independence entities ====
- Real Audiencia of Panama
- State of Panama
- Department of Panama

=== Brazil ===
- Panamá, Goiás, a city in the state of Goiás

=== Canada ===
- Panama station, a light metro station which replaced the old Terminus Brossard-Panama

=== Chile ===
- Panamá, Santa Cruz

=== Sri Lanka ===
- Panama, Sri Lanka

=== United States ===
- Panama, California
- Panama, California, alternate name of Rio Bravo, a former settlement
- Panama City, Florida
- Panama City Beach, Florida
- Panama, Illinois
- Panama, Iowa
- Panama, Missouri
- Panama, Nebraska
- Panama, New York
- Panama, Oklahoma

=== Philippines ===
- Panama, old name of the island of Panay in early Spanish maps

== Music ==
- Panama (band), an electronic band based in Sydney, Australia
- Panama (album), by A Balladeer
- "Panama" (jazz standard), a traditional jazz tune
- "Panama" (song), by Van Halen
- "Panama", a song by The Avener
- "Panama", a song by the Cat Empire

== Film and television ==
- Panama (2015 film), a Serbian drama film
- Panama (2022 film), an American action thriller film
- "Panama" (Prison Break), a television episode

== Ships ==
- USS Panama (SP-101), a United States Navy patrol boat in commission from 1917 to 1920
- SS Panama (1902), a passenger ship
- SS Panama (1939), a passenger liner converted to troop transport during World War II

== Other uses ==
- Panama (ad system), an online advertising platform
- Panama Papers, a set of 11.5 million documents detailing attorney–client information, leaked in 2016
- PANAMA, a cryptographic primitive that can be used as a hash function and a stream cipher
- Panama disease, a banana plant disease
- Panama hat
- Panama (sheep), an American sheep breed
- Panama weave, a.k.a. basketweave, a type of fabric

== See also ==
- Pamana (disambiguation)
- USS Panaman (ID-3299), a United States Navy cargo ship and troop transport in commission from 1918 to 1919
