= U.S. Route 99 =

Former numbered U.S. highway in California, Oregon, and Washington

U.S. Route 99

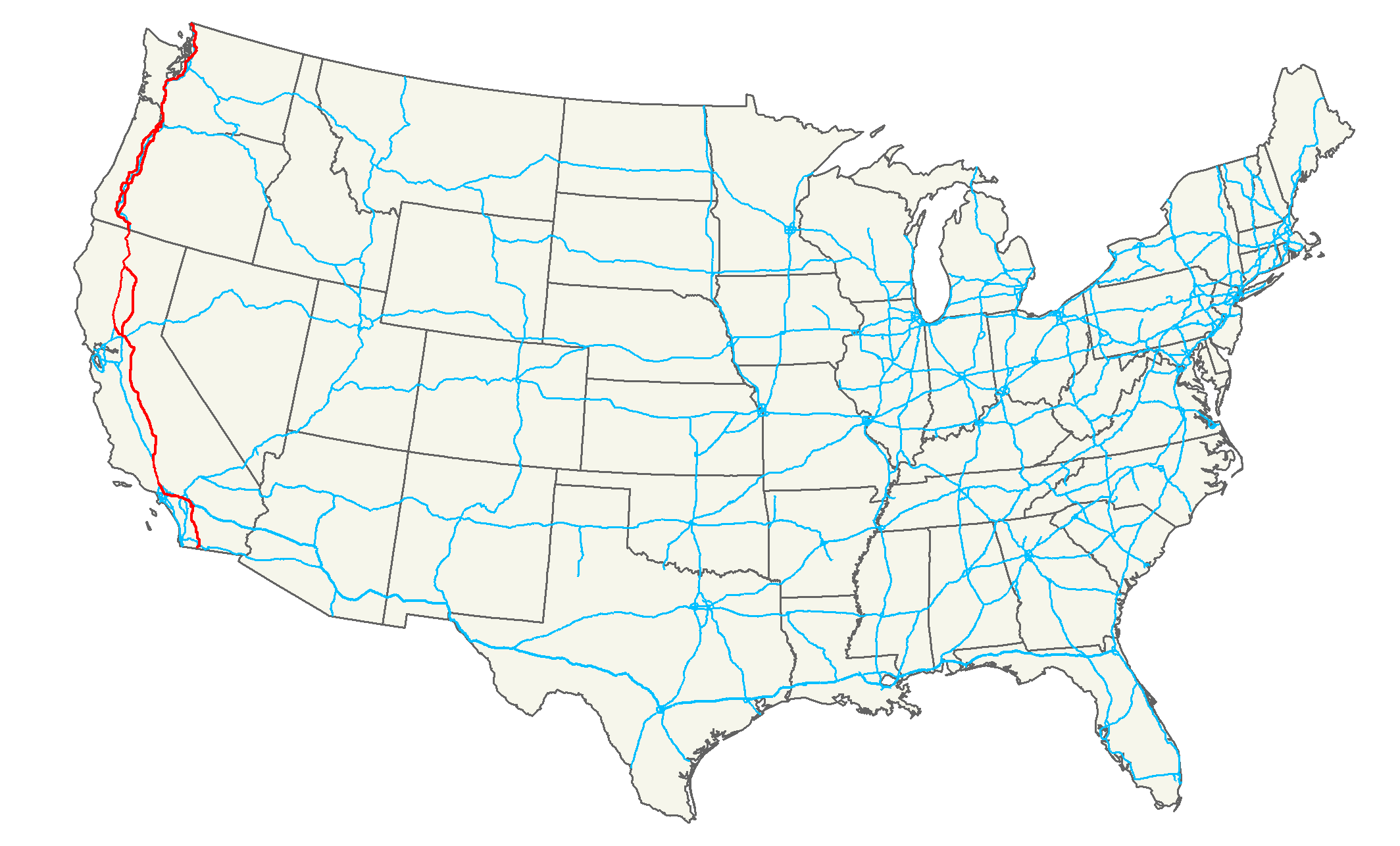
- US 99 highlighted in red

Route information
- Length: 1,600 mi (2,600 km)
- Existed: 1926–1972

Major junctions
- South end: Fed. 5 at Mexican border in Calexico, CA
- US 80 in El Centro, CA; US 60 / US 70 in Los Angeles, CA; US 6 / US 66 / US 101 in Los Angeles, CA; US 50 from French Camp, CA to Sacramento, CA; US 40 from Davis, CA to Roseville, CA; US 20 in Corvallis, OR–Albany, OR; US 30 in Portland, OR; US 101 / US 410 in Olympia, WA; US 10 in Seattle, WA
- North end: Highway 99 at Canadian border in Blaine, WA

Location
- Country: United States
- States: California, Oregon, Washington

Highway system
- United States Numbered Highway System; List; Special; Divided
← US 98	US	→ US 101
← SR 98	CA	→ SR 99
← US 97	OR	→ OR 99
← US 97	WA	→ SR 99

U.S. Route 99 (US 99) was a main north–south United States Numbered Highway on the West Coast of the United States until 1964, running from Calexico, California, on the Mexican border to Blaine, Washington, on the Canadian border. It was assigned in 1926 and existed until it was replaced for the most part by Interstate 5. Known also as the "Golden State Highway" and "The Main Street of California", US 99 was important throughout much of the 1930s as a route for Dust Bowl immigrant farm workers to traverse the state.

Sections of the highway were replaced with freeways that were initially signed as US 99 and later became part of Interstate 5. The entire highway was decommissioned in 1972. Large portions are now California State Route 99 (SR 99), Oregon's Routes 99, 99W, and 99E, and Washington's SR 99. The highway in Washington connected to British Columbia Highway 99, whose number was derived from that of US 99, at the Canada–US border.

== Route description ==
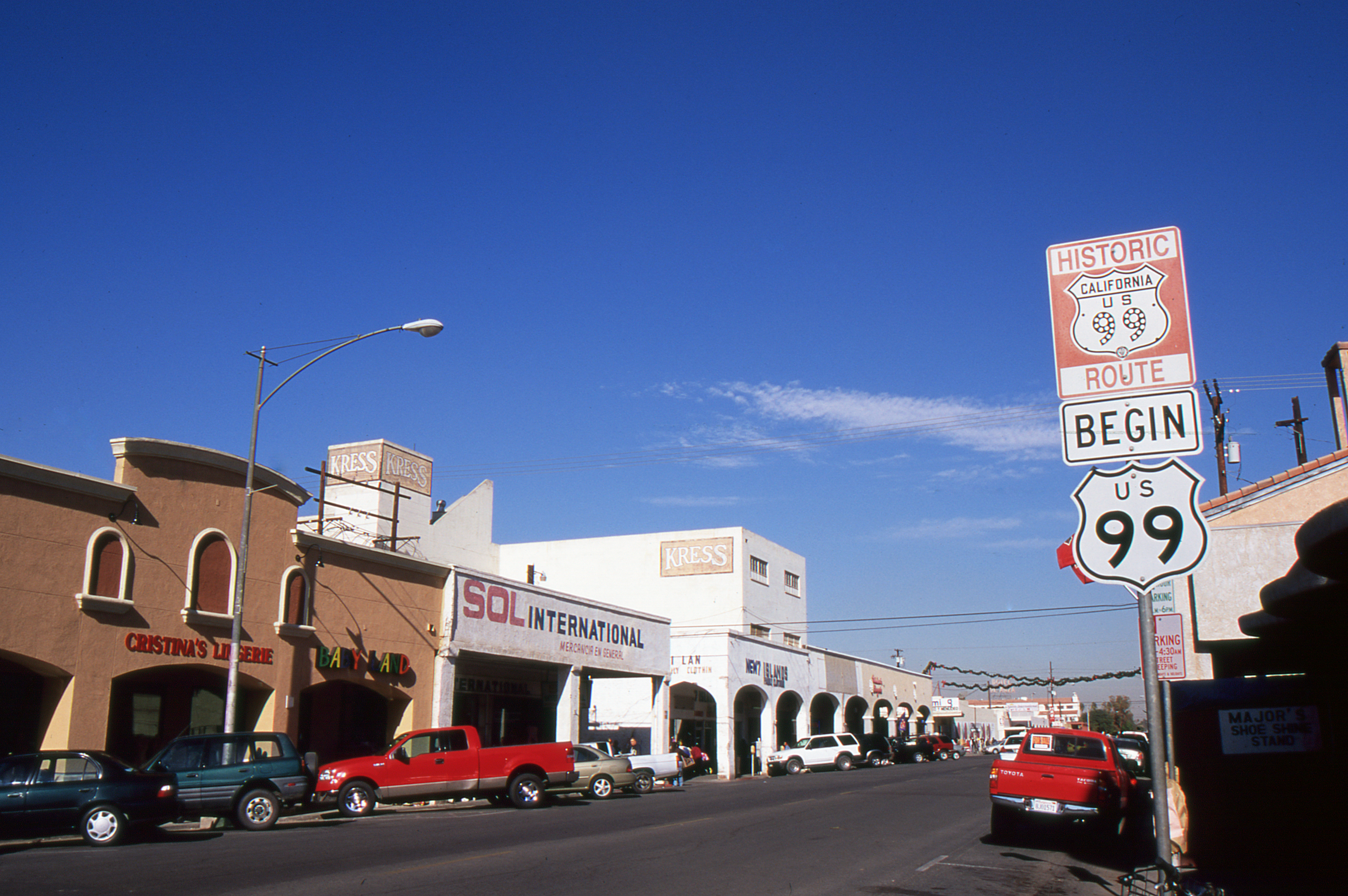
Historic southern terminus of US 99 in Calexico, CA

=== California ===
The basic former route of U.S. Route 99 in California started at the Mexico–United States border in Calexico, and then ran north through the Imperial Valley and along the western shore of the Salton Sea to the Coachella Valley (roughly present-day California State Route 86 and California State Route 111). US 99 then headed west to Los Angeles (present-day Interstate 10), and then north again to the Central Valley (present-day Interstate 5). US 99 then continued along the present-day corridor of California State Route 99 to Bakersfield, Fresno, and Sacramento. In Sacramento, the highway split into two suffixed routes, 99W and 99E. US 99W roughly followed the route of present-day Interstate 5 on the western side of the Sacramento Valley, and US 99E followed present-day State Route 99 on the eastern side of the valley. The two rejoined in Red Bluff, and US 99 continued along the present-day Interstate 5 corridor to the Oregon border.

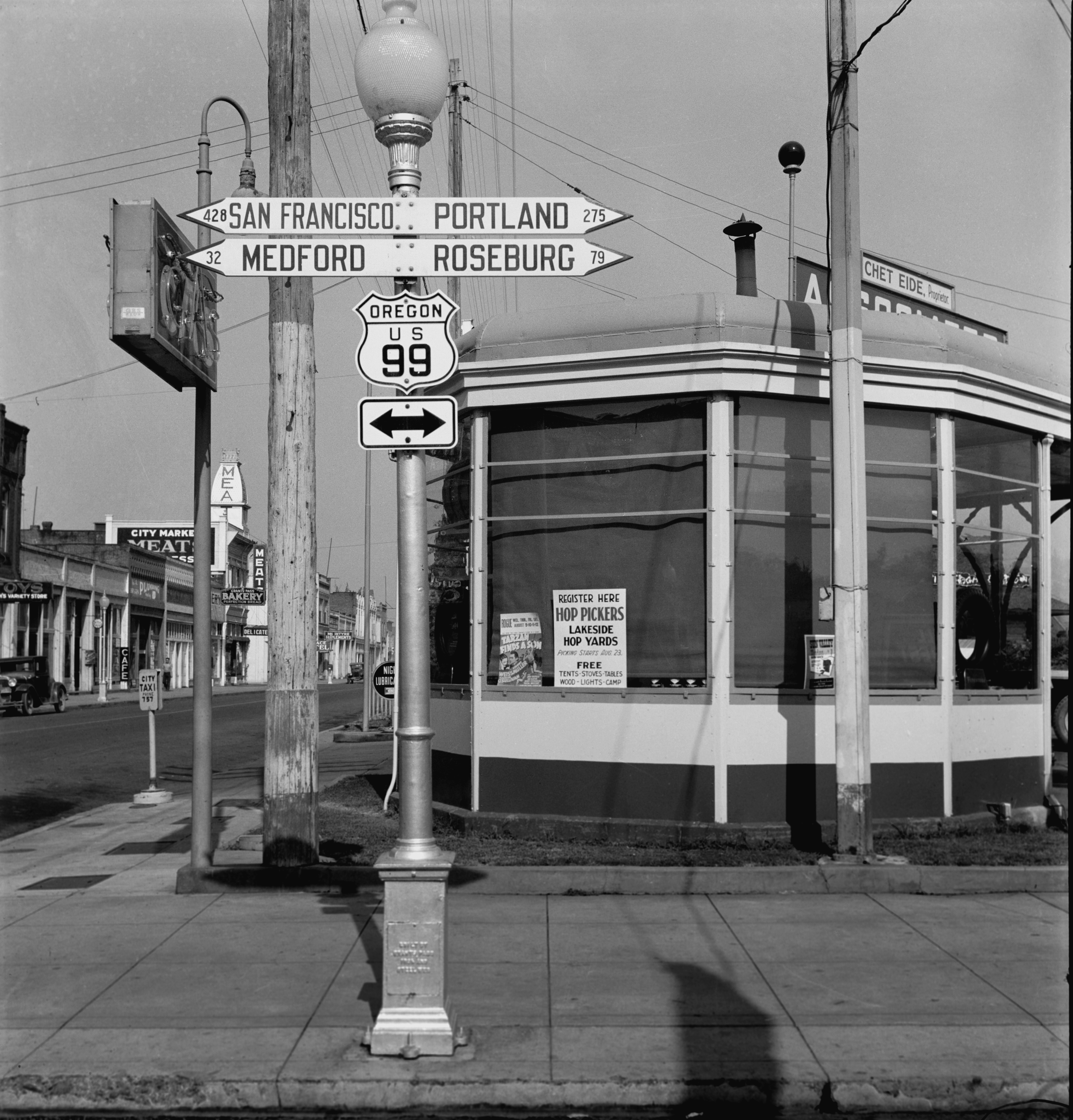
U.S. Route 99 in Grants Pass, Oregon, 1939

=== Oregon ===
The former route of U.S. Route 99 in Oregon mostly follows routes currently signed as Oregon Route 99, 99E, and 99W. The primary exception is from the California–Oregon state border north to Ashland, Oregon, where U.S. 99 is currently designated as Oregon Route 273 from the state border to Exit 6 of Interstate 5. The former route is coterminous with Interstate 5 from Exit 6 to the junction of Oregon Route 99 in Ashland.

=== Washington ===
Unlike in California and Oregon, much of the former route of U.S. Highway 99 in Washington exists as local roads and regular city streets; only the route from Fife to Everett still retains the same number as State Route 99. US 99 went through two stages of redevelopment in Washington. The first was a general replacement of the original two-lane highway with a four-lane limited-access highway. At that time, the limited-access highway was badged as US 99, and any parallel original route was generally known as "old 99". The second phase was the development of an Interstate Highway, much of which followed the new 99 route and is known as I-5.

== History ==
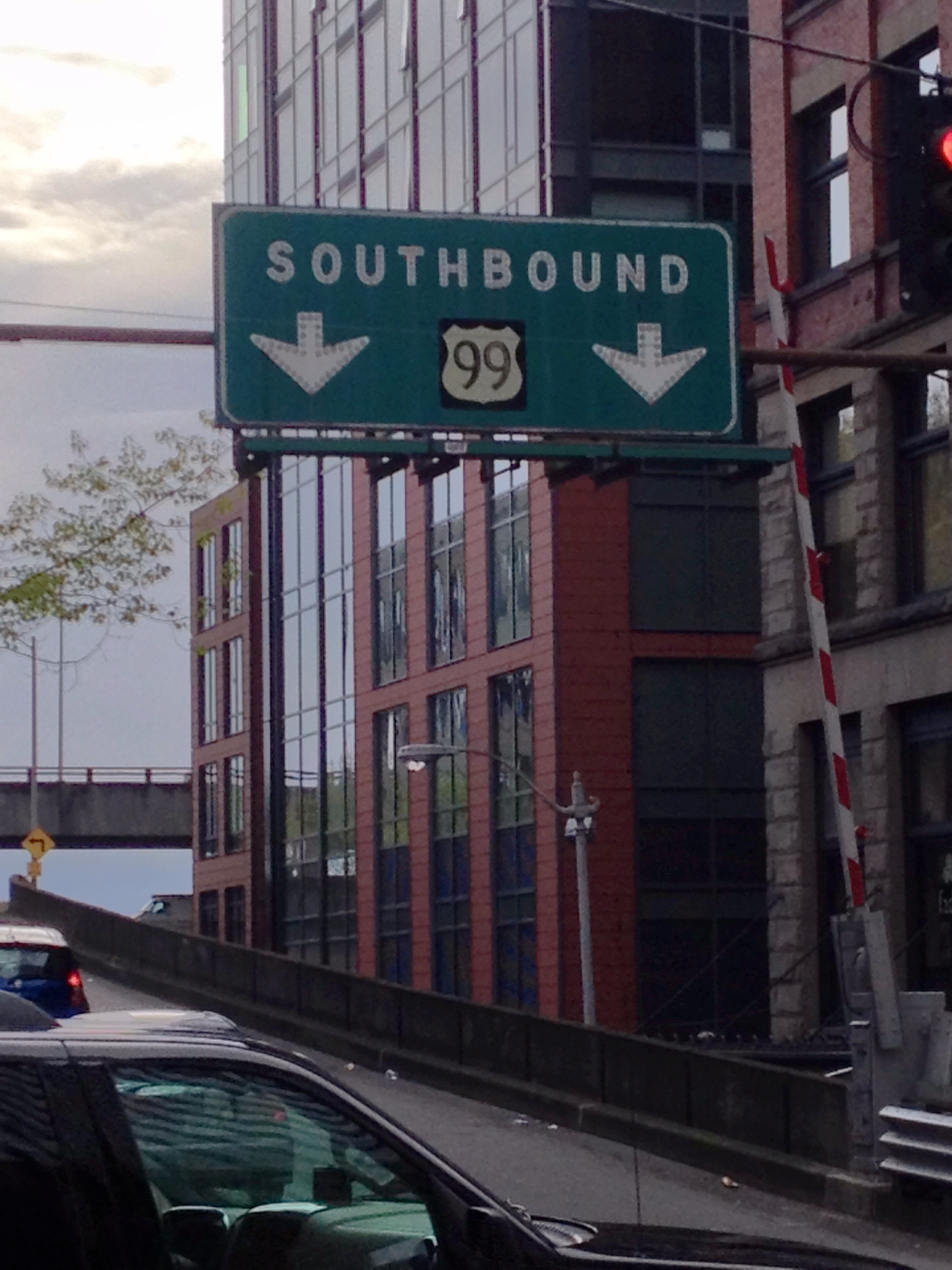
US 99 Sign in Downtown Seattle, at the entrance to the old Alaskan Way Viaduct. The viaduct was torn down in 2019 after it was replaced by the State Route 99 tunnel.

An extensive section of this highway (over 600 miles [970 km]), from approximately Stockton, California to Vancouver, Washington, follows very closely the track of the Siskiyou Trail. The Siskiyou Trail was based on an ancient network of Native American Indian footpaths connecting the Pacific Northwest with California's Central Valley. By the 1820s, trappers from the Hudson's Bay Company were the first non-Native Americans to use the route of U.S. Highway 99 to move between today's Washington state and California. During the second half of the 19th Century, mule train trails, stagecoach roads, and the path of the Central Pacific railroad (later the Southern Pacific railroad) also followed the route of the Siskiyou Trail. By the early 20th century, pioneering automobile roads were built along the Siskiyou Trail, including most notably the Pacific Highway. The Pacific Highway ran from British Columbia to San Diego and is the immediate predecessor of much of U.S. Highway 99. The highway was continuous pavement by the mid-1930s.

=== Decommissioning ===
By 1968, US 99 was completely decommissioned with the near completion of I-5 in Washington and California, but the highway's phasing out actually began July 1, 1964, when Collier Senate Bill No. 64 passed on September 20, 1963. The bill launched a major program designed to greatly simplify California's increasingly complicated highway numbering system and eliminate concurrent postings. The highways that replaced it are

- SR 111 and SR 86 between the Mexico–US border and Indio.
- I-10, replacing US 60 and US 70 between Indio and Los Angeles as well.
- U.S. Route 101 and SR 110 in downtown Los Angeles.
- I-5 from north of downtown Los Angeles to its modern-day split in Wheeler Ridge before 99's final decommissioning in 1968.

In 1972, AASHTO gave permission to the Oregon State Highway Commission to retire US 99W, US 99E and US 99 from the national system. The final segments of US 99 were then decommissioned and re-organized into OR 99W, OR 99E and OR 99.

=== Successor highways ===
All three states have replaced some portions of US 99 with state highways of the same number:

- Washington: 50 miles (80 km) of US 99, from Fife (in Pierce County) to Everett (in Snohomish County), is now State Route 99. It is mostly a surface-level highway with the exception of the SR 99 Tunnel through downtown Seattle. The tunnel was created to replace the Alaskan Way Viaduct, which was torn down in 2019.
- A 4-mile section of the old US 99 through unincorporated Hazel Dell and Salmon Creek, north of Vancouver, Washington is still known as NE Highway 99.
- Other portions of the old US 99 are now designated as SR 505, SR 509, SR 529, and SR 530 or with names such as "Old Highway 99 S.E." or "Pacific Highway S.W."

Historic US 99 in California

- Oregon: Most of former US 99 in Oregon now signed as Oregon Route 99 (OR 99). The route still provides surface-level access to many southern Oregon towns served by I-5. It also provides access to many towns in the Willamette Valley. Between Junction City and Portland, the highway splits into eastern and western routes known as OR 99E and OR 99W, respectively. For significant stretches, OR 99 shares an alignment with I-5. Officially, the highway is signed with both route numbers when this occurs; however, in practice, this is often not the case as the OR 99 designation is dropped in favor of I-5. One notable exception is a stretch of OR 99E that runs between Albany and Salem, where OR 99E is cosigned along the highway.
- California: The 425-mile (684 km) stretch between Wheeler Ridge and Red Bluff is signed as State Route 99 which makes it California's second-longest state highway behind SR 1. However, the newly enacted Historic U.S. Route 99 extends from Indio starting from Interstate 10 in the Coachella Valley all the way down the Imperial Valley to Calexico on the US-Mexico border with Mexicali, Baja California, Mexico.

== Major intersections ==
California

- Fed. 5 at U.S.–Mexico border in Calexico
- US 80 in El Centro
- US 60 / US 70 from Indio to Los Angeles
- US 91 / US 395 in Colton
- US 101 in Los Angeles
- US 6 / US 66 in Los Angeles
- US 6 at Newhall Pass
- US 466 from Bakersfield to Famoso
- US 399 in Greenfield
- US 50 from Stockton to Sacramento
- US 99W / US 99E in Sacramento
- US 40 from Davis to Sacramento ( US 99W) and Sacramento to Roseville (US 99E)
- US 99W / US 99E in Red Bluff
- US 299 in Redding
- US 97 in Weed

Oregon

- US 199 in Grants Pass
- US 126 in Eugene
- US 99W / US 99E in Junction City
- US 20 in Corvallis (US 99W) and Albany (US 99E)
- US 26 in Portland (US 99W and 99E)
- US 30 in Portland (US 99W and 99E)
- US 99W / US 99E near Portland

Washington

- US 830 from Vancouver to near Kelso
- US 101 / US 410 in Olympia
- US 410 in Tacoma
- US 10 in Seattle
- US 2 in Everett
- Highway 99 at Canada–US border in Blaine

== Special routes ==
=== US Route 99W (California) ===
U.S. Route 99W
- Location: Sacramento–Red Bluff
- Existed: 1926–1964

US 99W in California ran from Sacramento, where it diverged from highway 99E, to Red Bluff. This section of the highway ran through towns such as Corning, Orland, Willows, Artois, Williams, and Maxwell. This section of the highway runs parallel with current day Interstate 5.

=== US Route 99E (California) ===
U.S. Route 99E
- Location: Sacramento–Red Bluff
- Existed: 1926–1964

US 99E in California ran from Sacramento to Red Bluff and was partially concurrent to California State Route 36. This section of the highway ran through towns such as Chico, Durham, Richvale, and Yuba City. This section of the highway is currently used as part of California's State Route 99.

=== US Route 99W (Oregon) ===
U.S. Highway 99W
- Location: Junction City–Portland
- Existed: 1926–1972

US 99W in Oregon ran from Junction City, where it diverged from highway 99E, to Portland. The US designation was redesignated as Oregon Route 99W in 1972. In 1994, Oregon 99W was truncated to Interstate 5 in Tigard at Exit 294. As such, highways 99W and 99E no longer converge.

=== US Route 99E (Oregon) ===
U.S. Highway 99E
- Location: Junction City–Portland
- Existed: 1926–1972

US 99E in Oregon ran from Junction City, where it diverged from highway 99W, to Portland, but using a different route than highway 99W. A segment between Albany and Salem is cosigned with Interstate 5. Like its western counterpart, US 99E was changed to state highway 99E in 1972. Its current northern terminus is at Interstate 5 in Delta Park near the Portland Expo Center at Exit 307.

=== Alternate and business routes in Washington ===
U.S. Route 99 Alternate
- Location: Bellingham
- Existed: 1931–1964

U.S. Route 99 Alternate
- Location: Bellingham–Canadian border
- Existed: 1952–1969

U.S. Route 99 Business
- Location: Seattle, Washington

Two routes in Washington were designated US Route 99 Alternate; both passed through parts of Bellingham, and for about twelve years both had this designation at the same time.

In 1931, a new route for US 99 was constructed near the east side of Lake Samish (similar to the route of today's Interstate 5), and US 99 was moved to this new road. As a result, the older 99 route past Bellingham Bay (Chuckanut Drive) was designated as US 99 Alternate. Today, this older route is Washington State Route 11.

Beginning in 1952, the other US Route 99 Alternate began in downtown Bellingham and went due north along the Guide Meridian to Lynden and then to Canada. This highway was decommissioned in 1969 and is today known as Washington State Route 539.

Both of these routes were renumbered in the 1964 when the state decommissioned all of US Route 99 and scrapped its entire highway numbering system to replace it with a new system.

A business route ran in Seattle, Washington and began at exit and entrance ramps on Aurora Ave. just before a tunnel that connected the Alaskan Way Viaduct and Aurora Ave. near 4th Ave S. & Denny Way. The south-bound route went down Wall St. until it met 2nd Ave. following that until it merged with 4th Ave. S. then following that until the end of the route. The north-bound route went from 4th Ave. S. & E. Marginal Way up to Battery Street, following it until it used 7th Ave. to continue north on the main highway. This was the original route of U.S. 99 until the viaduct was constructed in the 1950s. The business route ended at 4th Ave. S. & E. Marginal Way where the business route connected back with the highway.

== Legacy ==
Travel on U.S. Route 99 is highlighted in a long poem by Gary Snyder, "Night Highway 99".

Route 99 was planned to be featured in Pixar's Cars 3, as confirmed by Michael Wallis. However, this never went through.

== See also ==
- U.S. Route 199
- U.S. Route 299 (Decommissioned)
- U.S. Route 399 (Decommissioned)
