= CA-48 =

CA-48 or Ca-48 may refer to:

- California's 48th congressional district
- California State Route 48, a proposed highway
- U.S. Route 48 in California, a former highway
- Calcium-48 (Ca-48 or ^{48}Ca), an isotope of calcium
