= U.S. Route 48 (disambiguation) =

U.S. Route 48 is part of the Appalachian Development Highway System.

U.S. Route 48 may also refer to:

- U.S. Route 48 (1926), a highway in California and one of the original routes in the United States Numbered Highways system
- U.S. Route 48 (1969–1989), a highway in West Virginia and Maryland now designated as Interstate 68
