= Pamana =

Pamana may refer to:

- Pamana Island, Indonesia
- Pamana language or Kagwahiva language, a Tupi–Guarani dialect cluster of Brazil
- Pamana (TV series), a Filipino educational series beginning in 2001
- "Pamana", the first part of the 2012 Filipino film Shake, Rattle and Roll XIV : The Invasion
- Pamana, a 2018 Filipino television film produced by TAPE Inc.

== See also ==
- Gedhe Pamanahan, the first ruler of the Sultanate of Mataram
- Panama (disambiguation)
