= State highways in California =

California State Highway System
- Standard route signage in California for (from left-to-right) an Interstate Highway, a U.S. Highway, and a State Route

System information
- Notes: All classes of state-numbered highways are generally state-maintained.

Highway names
- Interstates: Interstate X (I-X)
- US Highways: U.S. Route X (US X)
- State: State Route X (SR X)

System links
- State highways in California; Interstate; US; State; Scenic; History; Pre‑1964; Unconstructed; Deleted; Freeways

The state highway system of the U.S. state of California is a network of highways that are owned and maintained by the California Department of Transportation (Caltrans).

Each highway is assigned a Route (officially State Highway Route) number in the Streets and Highways Code (Sections 300–635). Most of these are numbered in a statewide system, and are known as State Route X (abbreviated SR X). United States Numbered Highways are labeled US X, and Interstate Highways are Interstate X. Under the code, the state assigns a unique Route X to each highway, and does not differentiate between state, US, or Interstate highways.

The California Highway Patrol (CHP) is tasked with patrolling all state highways to enforce traffic laws.

== Overview ==
=== The State Highway System ===
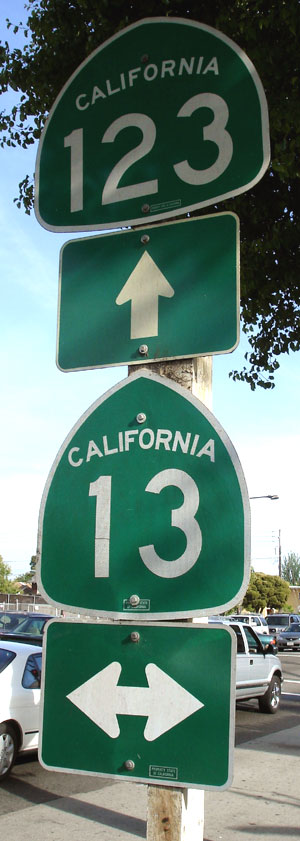
Route shield signs at the intersection of SR 123 and SR 13 in Berkeley

California's highway system is governed pursuant to Division 1 of the California Streets and Highways Code, which is one of the 29 California Codes enacted by the state legislature. Since July 1 of 1964, the majority of legislative route numbers, those defined in the Streets and Highways Code, match the sign route numbers. For example, Interstate 5 is listed as "Route 5" in the code.

Some short routes are instead signed as parts of other routes regardless of legislative definition. For instance, Route 112 and Route 260 are signed as part of the longer State Route 61. Route 51 is signed as Interstate 80 Business, but is done so under legislative mandate in section 351.1.

The Streets and Highways Code allows for non-contiguous segments of state highways, which are logged by Caltrans using the route's postmile data, picking up where it leaves off at any legislative breaks in the state highway as originally measured. To avoid duplication, concurrencies are only listed in one of their respective highway's definition, and are treated as non-contiguous segments in their other highways' definition. For example, the I-80/I-580 concurrency, known as the Eastshore Freeway, only falls under the Route 80 description in the highway code while the definition of Route 580 is broken into non-contiguous segments. However, Caltrans may not sign all concurrences. For example, while Route 1 is generally co-signed along Route 101 between its disconnected segment from San Francisco to Sausalito, Route 1 is not co-signed along Route 101 between near the Ventura-Santa Barbara county line and Las Cruces.

The state highway system may be expanded by either construction of new state highways or adoption of local highways as state highways. Section 75 allows the California Transportation Commission to select, adopt and determine locations for state highway routes, while Section 90 empowers Caltrans to construct and maintain said state highways between the termini designated by the routes listed in Chapter 2, Article 3. Section 81 allows the commission to adopt local highways as state highways, and without compensation as stated in Section 83, as long as the adopted route meets eligibility requirements. Said requirements include that the road be traversable from end-to-end, must exist along a route defined in Chapter 2, Article 3 to be superseded or yet to be constructed, be contiguous to a portion of the state highway system currently maintained by Caltrans, and be constructed to adequate standards. For example, Seal Beach Boulevard in the City of Seal Beach between Route 1 and Route 405 would be eligible for adoption under Section 81, as its traversable alignment matches an unconstructed portion of Route 605 as defined in Section 619, subdivision (a). By law, an adoption under this section would sign the route as State Route 605.

Section 73 of the code permits the commission to relinquish any portion of a state highway to a city or county that has been deleted via legislative enactment or superseded by relocation, but only after the highway has been placed in a state of good repair as defined in Section 23. Legislative deletion can involve the superseding of a state highway route by a different state highway route that serves a similar corridor, such as the completion of Route 105 forcing the deletion of Route 42, or an agreement between the state and city or county to transfer a portion of state highway to local control based on the desires of either entity. Depending on the relinquishment, the local jurisdiction may be required to install and maintain signs directing drivers to the continuation of that highway (although there are no direct enforcement powers for this in the code, and thus for budgetary reasons a local jurisdiction may just remove the Caltrans-posted highway signs without replacing them, or leave them standing until they became dilapidated). These portions of state highway relinquished are deemed by the legislature to be ineligible for future adoption under Section 81. In most cases, these highways are ineligible by default as the route's definition is amended by the legislature.

=== Alternate routes ===
California state highways have three types of alternate routes: Business routes, unrelinquished routes, and supplemental routes. Alternate routes are not defined by the Streets and Highways Code.

Business routes are not state highways and are instead locally maintained, unless they overlay other routes of the state highway system (such as I-80 Bus. in Sacramento running concurrently with the unsigned State Route 51). Local authorities may request business route assignment from the Caltrans Transportation System Information Program. Interstate and U.S. business routes also require approval of the executive committee of the American Association of State Highway and Transportation Officials (AASHTO).

Unrelinquished routes are state highways that have been superseded by a newly constructed alignment via Section 73, but the state and local municipality have yet to come to proper terms and conditions to relinquish the state highway and place it in a good state of repair according to Section 23. These highways carry the suffix U, such as Route 8U, Route 14U and Route 210U. Unrelinquished state highways can remain on the system indefinitely, with some existing for decades.

Supplemental routes are state highways consisting of spurs, truck lanes and bus lanes where all or part of the roadway is a separate alignment. These highways carry the suffix S. Spurs may constitute highways that were constructed to bypass local traffic, such as Route 86S and Route 180S, tolled freeway bypasses, such as Route 880S, and even unrelinquished routes, such as Route 5S or Route 178S. Any parent route that is bypassed by a supplemental route along the same legislative route definition is authorized for relinquishment under Section 73. If relinquished, the supplemental route assumes the parent route.

== History ==
It is the intent of the Legislature ... that the routes of the state highway system serve the state's heavily traveled rural and urban corridors, that they connect the communities and regions of the state, and that they serve the state's economy by connecting centers of commerce, industry, agriculture, mineral wealth, and recreation.

— Section 300 of the California Streets and Highways Code

Counties covered by the Automobile Club of Southern California (red) and California State Automobile Association (blue)

The first legislative routes were defined by the State Highway Bond Act in 1909, passed by the California State Legislature and signed by Governor James Gillett. These, and later extensions to the system, were numbered sequentially. No signs were erected for these routes.

The United States Numbered Highways were assigned by the American Association of State Highway Officials (AASHO) in November 1926, but posting did not begin in California until January 1928. These were assigned to some of the main legislative routes in California. Initially, signs were posted by the Automobile Club of Southern California (ACSC) and California State Automobile Association (CSAA), which had been active in signing national auto trails and local roads since the mid-1900s.

In 1934, after the major expansion of the state highway system in 1933 by the California Legislature, California sign route numbers were assigned by the California Division of Highways (predecessor to Caltrans). The California sign route numbers were assigned in a geographical system, completely independent of the legislative routes. Odd-numbered routes ran north–south and even-numbered routes ran east–west. The CSAA covered central and northern California, and the ACSC covered southern California. CSAA routes could be identified by their number: either a multiple of four, or a multiple of four plus one. Other numbers would signify a ACSC route. For example, SR-1, 4, 5, 8, and 9 would be in central or northern California, and SR-2, 3, 6, 7, and 10 would be in southern California.

A rough grid was used inside the two regions, with the largest numbers – all less than 200 (except for State Route 740, which was related to State Route 74) – in eastern California (north–south) and near the border between the two regions (east–west).

The Interstate Highway System numbers were assigned by AASHO in late 1959. In 1963 and 1964, a total renumbering of the legislative routes was made, aligning them with the sign routes. Some changes were also made to the sign routes, mostly related to decommissionings of U.S. Routes in favor of Interstates.

Since the 1990s, many non-freeway routes, especially in urban areas, have been deleted and turned over to local control. This transfers the cost of maintaining them from state to local budgets, but also gives local governments direct control over urban arterial roads that carry primarily local traffic. Once transferred, if a local government wants to make improvements such as adding landscaping in the center median, or installing additional traffic lights or other traffic control devices, it can immediately do so itself rather than having to negotiate with Caltrans. Not all cities have been prepared to accept such routes from Caltrans simultaneously, so many have been decommissioned from the state system one fragment at a time. In the case of the San Francisco Bay Area, the Caltrans district responsible for that region is granted permission to retain in the State highway system routes that run on conventional (non freeway or expressway) roadways unless a freeway is built to bypass the surface street route.

== Use of definite article ==
One cultural difference between Northern and Southern Californians is that the latter tend to put the definite article "the" before highway numbers (e.g. "taking the 5 to L.A."), while the former use the number alone (e.g. "taking 80 to San Francisco") or less frequently, with "I-" in the case of interstate freeways. The Southern California usage of the definite article is seen as stereotypical of Southern California "surfer" culture, and has been parodied in the recurring Saturday Night Live sketch "The Californians". When the Southern California freeway system was built in the 1940s and early 1950s, local common usage was primarily the freeway name preceded by the definite article, such as "the Hollywood Freeway". It took several decades for Southern California locals to start to commonly refer to the freeways with the numerical designations, but usage of the definite article persisted. For example, it evolved to "the 605 Freeway" and then shortened to "the 605". This did not occur in Northern California, where usage of the route numbers was more common.

Signage along northbound U.S. Route 101 reflecting the different lexicon usage

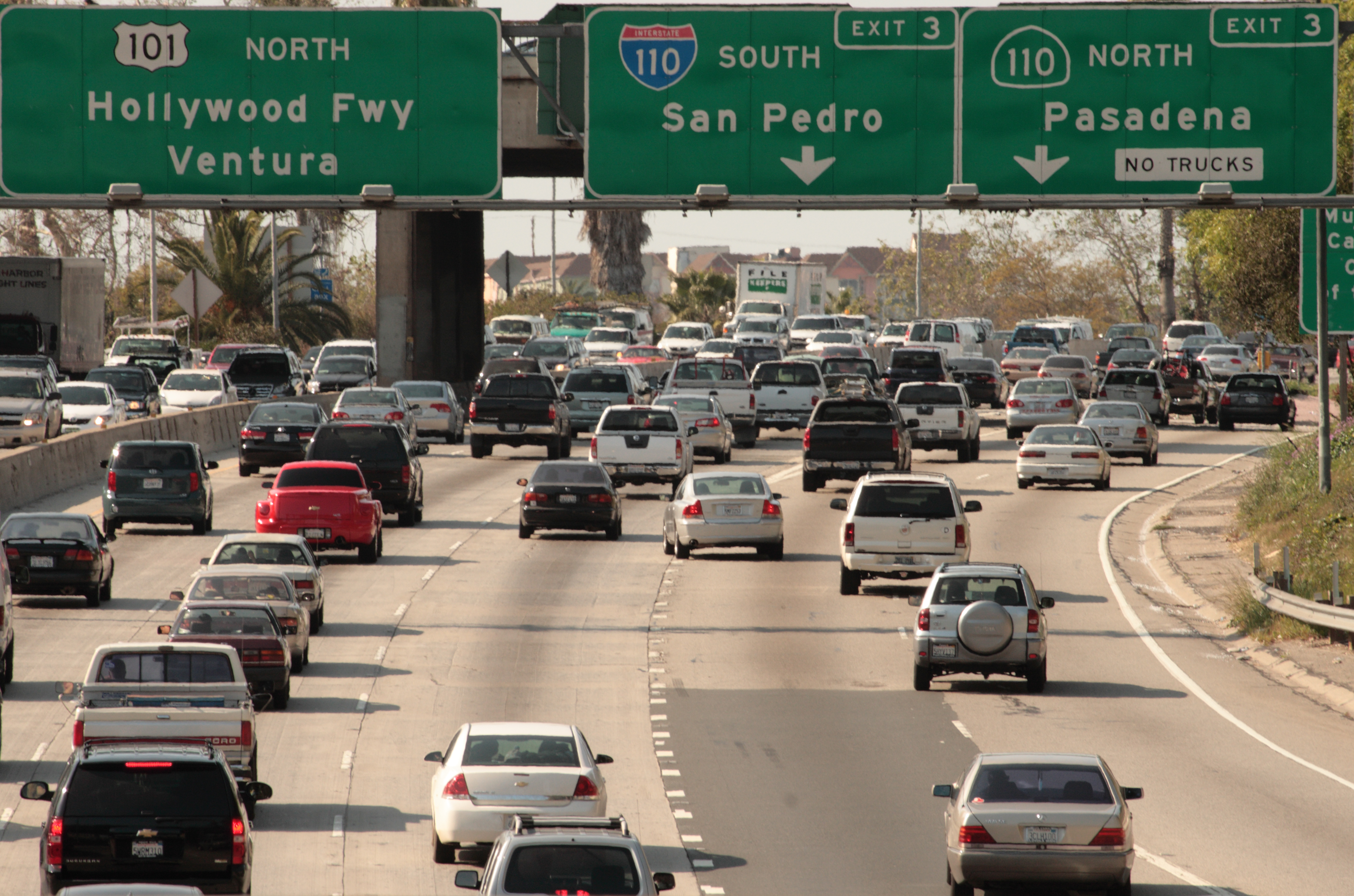
Signage at the 110 Freeway interchange in Los Angeles, with the leftmost sign for US 101 north listing both its name, the Hollywood Freeway, as well as its destination, Ventura

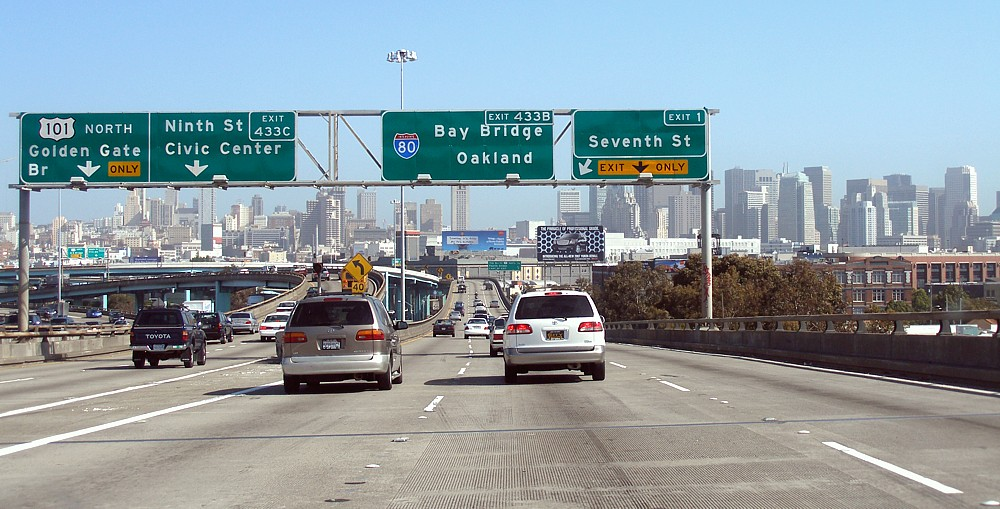
Signage at the Interstate 80 interchange in San Francisco, with the leftmost sign for US 101 north only listing its destination, the Golden Gate Bridge

== List of routes ==
The list of routes, as defined in the California Streets and Highways code, is split into the following pages:

- List of Interstate Highways in California
- List of U.S. Routes in California
- List of state highways in California

=== Former U.S. Routes In California ===
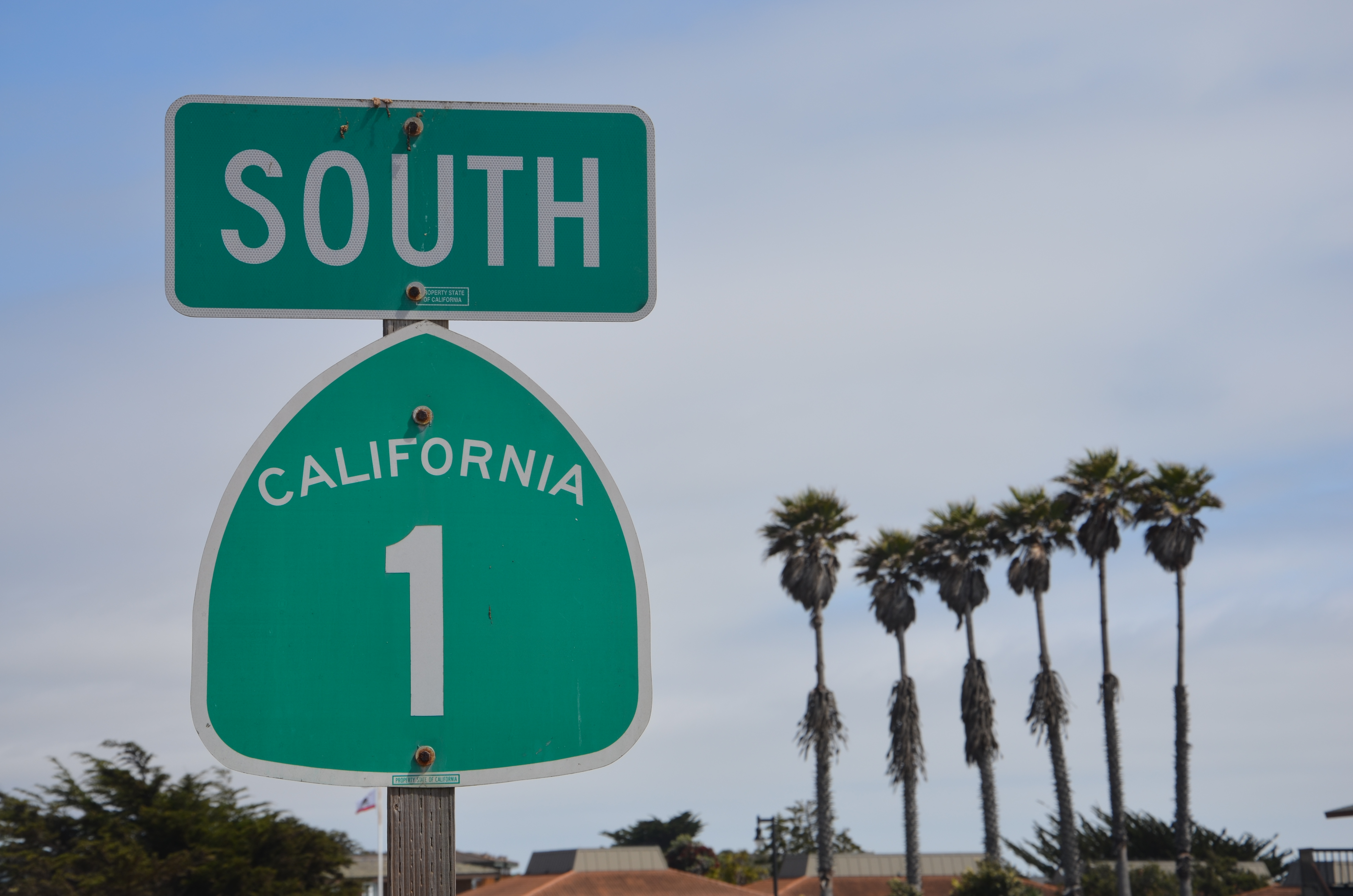
California State Route 1 road sign

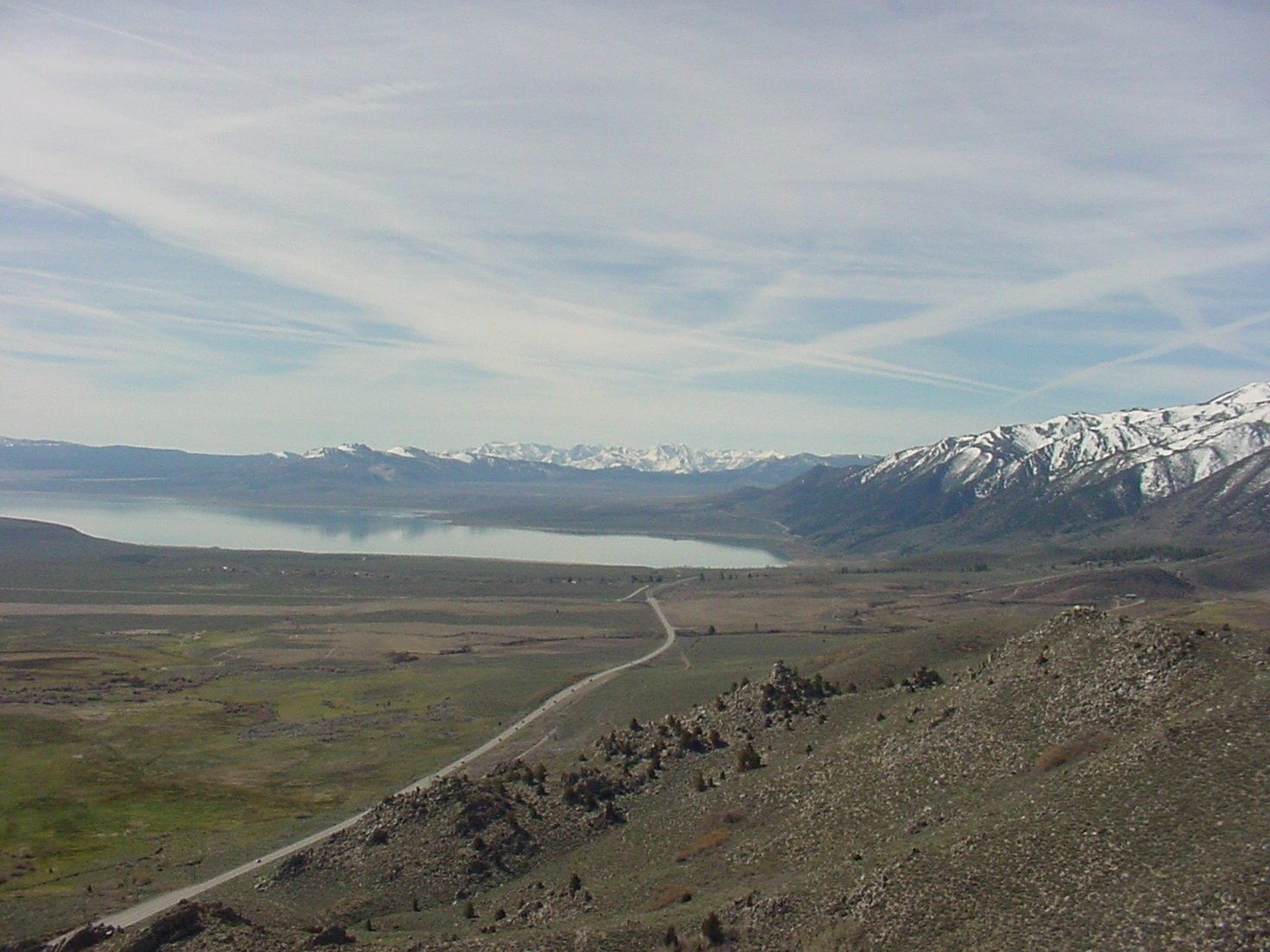
U.S. Route 395 looking south at Mono Lake

- U.S. Route 40
- U.S. Route 40 Alternate
- U.S. Route 48
- U.S. Route 60
- U.S. Route 66
- U.S. Route 70
- U.S. Route 80
- U.S. Route 91
- U.S. Route 99
- U.S. Route 99E (central California)
- U.S. Route 99E (northern California)
- U.S. Route 99W (central California)
- U.S. Route 99W (northern California)
- U.S. Route 101A
- U.S. Route 101 Bypass (San Francisco Bay area)
- U.S. Route 101 Bypass (Los Angeles & Orange counties)
- U.S. Route 101E
- U.S. Route 101W
- U.S. Route 299
- U.S. Route 399
- U.S. Route 466

== See also ==
- Deleted California State Highways
- Unconstructed California State Highways
- Scenic California State Highways
- List of county routes in California
