= U.S. Route 399 =

Former highway in California

U.S. Route 399
- US 399 highlighted in red

Route information
- Auxiliary route of US 99
- Maintained by Caltrans
- Length: 124 mi (200 km)
- Existed: 1934–1964

Major junctions
- South end: US 101 in Ventura
- SR 33 in Taft
- North end: US 99 in Pumpkin Center

Location
- Country: United States
- State: California
- Counties: Ventura, Santa Barbara, San Luis Obispo, Kern

Highway system
- United States Numbered Highway System; List; Special; Divided; State highways in California; Interstate; US; State; Scenic; History; Pre‑1964; Unconstructed; Deleted; Freeways
| ← US 395 | → I-405 |

U.S. Route 399 was a U.S. Highway in the state of California that ran from Ventura to Bakersfield. It was established in 1934 and decommissioned in 1964, as it was only 124 miles (200 km) long, less than the 300-mile (480 km) minimum that the American Association of State Highway and Transportation Officials (AASHTO) set as the threshold for U.S. Highways. It has been replaced with a segment of State Route 33 (SR 33), all of SR 119, and a segment of SR 99.

== Route description ==
From its original junction at US 101 in Ventura, the route continued along what is now SR 33 up to Ojai, temporarily joining SR 150. Leaving Ojai, it continued into the Los Padres National Forest along the Maricopa Highway, with its summit at Pine Mountain. Descending into the Cuyama River Valley, it met SR 166 and travelled east towards Maricopa past what is now the Carrizo Plain National Monument and crossing the axis of the San Andreas Fault into the southern San Joaquin Valley. In Maricopa, it continued north again with SR 33 into the southern Midway-Sunset Oil Field and intersecting modern SR 119 in Taft. From Taft, US 399 followed SR 119 out of town through Valley Acres and past the modern Buena Vista Recreation Area (the old Buena Vista Lake) towards US 99 (now SR 99) in Pumpkin Center and Greenfield, then with the old alignment of US 99 (Union Avenue, SR 99 Bus.) north into Bakersfield where it terminated. This ending, being a useless concurrency, was later truncated to US 99 until US 399 was decommissioned.

The route was subsequently realigned several times, most notably the original Ojai Freeway in southern Ventura which is now the modern SR 33 freeway, and the expressway bypass of eastern Taft which is now the modern SR 119 expressway.

== History ==
The origins to US 399 can be traced back to 1913. That year, the state decided to fund a survey party to determine a highway route between Legislative Route 4 (later became US 99 and today is known as SR 99) and Ventura. This highway was named the Bakersfield, Maricopa, and Ventura Road. At that time, several county roads which would become part of the route were already under construction. In the 1920s, the legislative definition would truncate the route as between Ventura and the Cuyama Valley. However, in 1934, the route would reemerge as a spur to US 99, called US 399.

By 1964, California's highway system was very cumbersome. Several routes were cosigned with two or even three route numbers. As a result, all of the state's highways were renumbered to simplify the system. During the renumbering, it was decided to decommission many of the US Routes in California in favor of Interstate and State Routes. The parent route, US 99, was also decommissioned, which contributed to the removal of this route. US 399 became one of the US routes to be completely decommissioned. It became part of SR 33 (West Side Highway), SR 166 (Maricopa Highway), and all of SR 119 (Taft Highway).

== Major intersections ==
| County | Location | mi | km | Destinations | Notes |
|---|---|---|---|---|---|
| Ventura | Ventura | 0 | 0.0 | US 101 – Los Angeles, San Francisco | Southern terminus |
| Ventura | Mira Monte | 12 | 19 | SR 150 west – Santa Barbara | Southern end of SR 150 concurrency |
| Ventura | Ojai | 13 | 21 | SR 150 east – Ojai, Santa Paula | Northern end of SR 150 concurrency |
| Santa Barbara | No major junctions | | | | |
| San Luis Obispo | | 70 | 110 | SR 166 – Santa Maria | Southern end of SR 166 concurrency |
| Kern | Maricopa | 85 | 137 | SR 166 east to US 99 | Northern end of SR 166 concurrency |
| Kern | Taft | 93 | 150 | SR 33 north – Taft | Southern terminus of SR 33 |
| Kern | Pumpkin Center | 124 | 200 | US 99 – Bakersfield, Los Angeles | Northern terminus |
1.000 mi = 1.609 km; 1.000 km = 0.621 mi: Concurrency terminus
