= Panamá, Santa Cruz =

Panamá
- Village
- Country: Chile
- Region: (O'Higgins Region) O'Higgins
- Provinces: Colchagua
- City: Santa Cruz

Government
  - Mayor of Santa Cruz: William Arévalo

Panamá is a village in the Chilean commune of Santa Cruz, Colchagua province.
