= Rio Bravo (former settlement), California =

Former settlement in Kern County, California, US

Coordinates: 35.29684°N 119.05678°W

Rio Bravo (also, Panama and Old Panama) is a former settlement in Kern County, California, United States. It was located on the railroad, 2 miles (3.2 km) north of Panama.

Rio Bravo was a Mexican settlement established in 1849. It took its name from the Spanish name for the Kern River Rio Bravo de San Felipe.

Later Rio Bravo was called Panama, and after that name was applied to the current place, as Old Panama. The application of the name Panama was descriptive of the location as low, swampy, and plagued by mosquitoes.

== See also ==
- List of ghost towns in California
