= U.S. Route 48 (1926) =

Former U.S. Highway in California

U.S. Route 48
- A former routing of US 48 highlighted in red

Route information
- Maintained by Caltrans
- Length: 87.3 mi (140.5 km)
- Existed: 1926–1931

Major junctions
- South end: US 101 in San Jose
- North end: US 99E in French Camp

Location
- Country: United States
- State: California
- Counties: Santa Clara, Alameda, San Joaquin

Highway system
- United States Numbered Highway System; List; Special; Divided; State highways in California; Interstate; US; State; Scenic; History; Pre‑1964; Unconstructed; Deleted; Freeways
← SR 47	→ SR 48

U.S. Route 48 (US 48) was a route in Central California near the San Francisco Bay Area. Assigned in 1926, it ran from San Jose to French Camp. It was the first US highway to be deleted in California and was one of the first few US highways to be deleted in the US.

== Route description ==
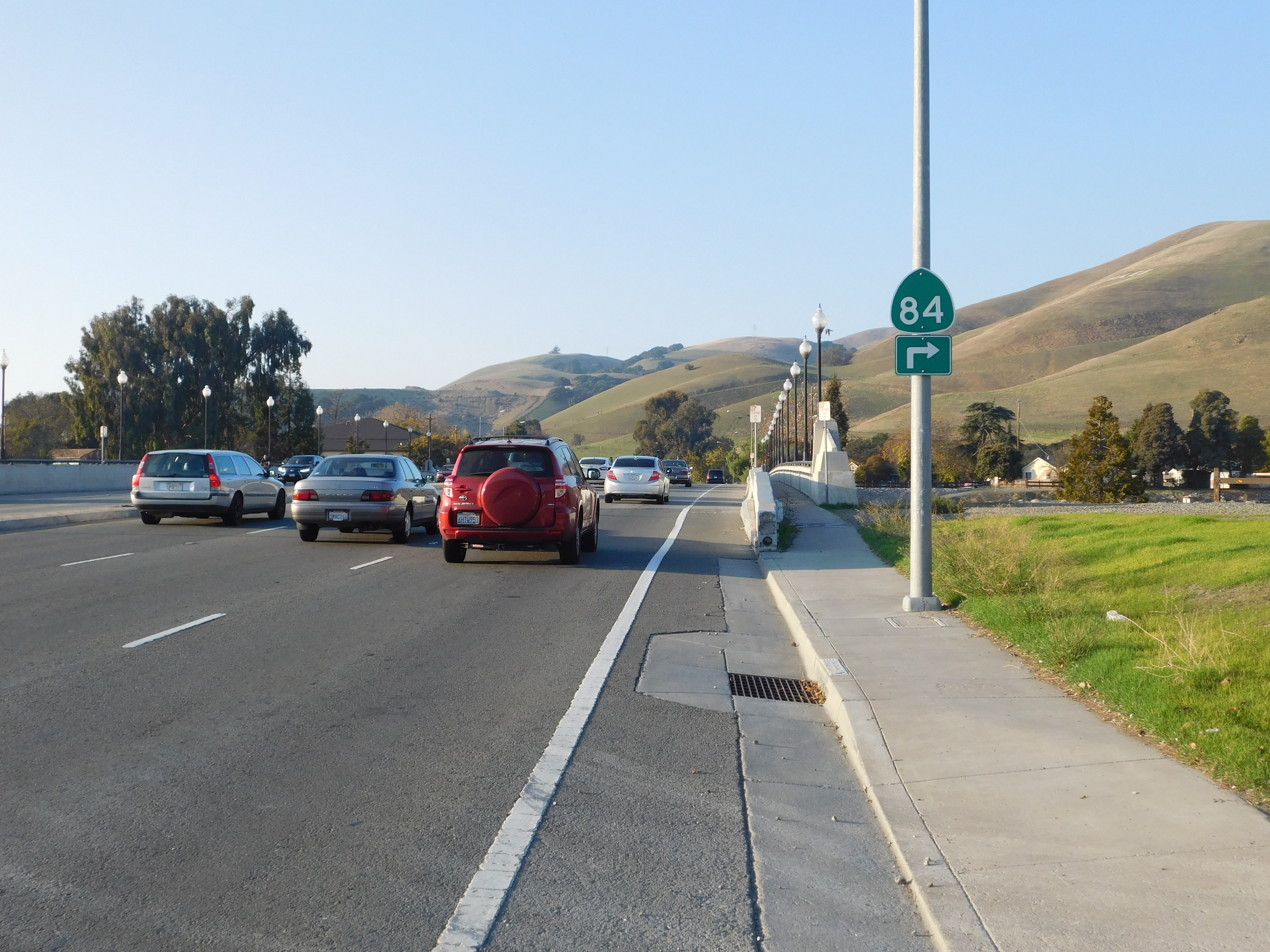
An old alignment of US 48, now SR 238

US 48 was a highway connecting the San Francisco Bay area with the San Joaquin Valley, traveling from San Jose to near Modesto, largely following the future routing of US 50, which replaced US 48. Its western terminus was located at former State Route 82 (SR 82), which was a former routing of US 101. From there, it head northeast on Downtown San Jose surface streets, roughly following the roads of Oakland Rd, Main St, and SR 238, eventually reaching the present day Interstate 580 (I-580), then east through the cities Pleasanton and Livermore on Castro Valley Rd, Dublin Canyon Rd, and Altamont Pass Rd. to the present-day separation between I-580 and I-205. From here, US 48 continued east on 11th St. (now I-205 Business (I-205 BUS)) through Tracy to former US 99W, now roughly I-5. It then followed US 99W northeast to Yosemite Ave, an old alignment of SR 120, where US 48 followed Yosemite Ave. to Main St, former US 99E, the location of its eastern terminus.

== History ==
US 48 was on the original map of US routes in 1926, running from Stockton to Oakland and San Jose (although at one time it was shown as US 42), along what is nowadays I-580 and US 101E/I-880. In 1928, US 48 was signed in California. It ran from French Camp to San Jose via Tracy and Hayward. By 1935, this had been renumbered as part of US-50 (Legislative Route Number 5) using a routing that is now I-580 and I-205 (from Oakland along I-580 until the I-205/I-580 junction, and then along I-205 to Tracy; however, there are some reports that include I-238 in Oakland as part of the original US 48, and that indicate it was numbered as US 101E. There are also some maps that show Route 237 as part of US 48 (née US 42).

In October 1913 the Lincoln Highway was formally dedicated. The Lincoln Highway was routed from French Camp over Altamont Pass on the following alignment:

- Ash Street to Harlan Road.
- Harlan Road through Lathrop to Manthey Road
- An older crossing via Manthey Road through Mossdale which is up river south of the current roadway.
- Manthey Road through the present right of way of I-5 to 11th Street/I-205 BL.
- 11th Street to Grant Line Road/County Sign Route J4.
- Grant Line Road/County Sign Route J4 to Banta via G Street.
- Likely 7th Street and F Street through Banta.
- F Street to Banta Road.
- Banta Road to 11th Street.
- 11th Street to Byron Road.
- Byron Road (which becomes County Sign Route J4 north of I-205) to Grant Line Road
- Grant Line Road to Altamont Pass Road
- Altamont Pass Road over Altamont Pass

The Lincoln Highway appears to have been shifted out of Banta by 1918 onto the 11th Street Bypass which can be seen on the State Highway Map of the same year. The route of US 48 was ultimately selected to be routed from French Camp west over Altamont Pass and by proxy San Jose in 1926. US 48 was largely planned to originate at US 99 in French Camp and travel southwest by way of Altamont Pass to San Jose. US 48 ultimately appears between French Camp and San Jose on 1926/1927 commercial maps. In 1928 State Maintenance of LRN 4 out of Stockton shifted to Mariposa Road. This eventually led to a request by the State of California to the AASHO to extend the east terminus of US 48 to Stockton and create a US 48N to Oakland. The request was for US 48 was borne out of US 99 moving out of French Camp to a direct alignment between Stockton-Manteca. The AASHO rejected this concept but offered an alternative which truncated US 48 from San Jose to Hayward and from French Camp to Mossdale. This alternative conceptualized US 101E and the US 99W/US 99E split from Stockton-Manteca. The truncation of US 48, creation of US 101E, and the US 99W/US 99E Stockton-Manteca split was approved in April 1929 by the AASHO. The State of California made a request to the AASHO to extend US 50 from Stockton to Oakland in 1931. The AASHO approved US 50 to subsume all of remaining US 48 by June of said year. The State of California would not attempt to resolve US 101E and the US 99W/US 99E Stockton-Manteca split by pursuing deletion of those routes until 1932.

West of Livermore, US 48 (LRN 5) continued through Dublin, the Castro Valley, and Hayward, and continued S to San Jose via Mission Blvd. The original plan (proposed in 1910) was to route LRN 5 along Castro Valley Road/Mattox Road, but the decision was made to use a route through Hayward. The first generation of LRN 5 was along East Castro Valley (the old version of Dublin Road, now abandoned) through Castro Valley, and on to Hayward via Grove and A Street. In 1926, LRN 5 became US 48, and in 1930, the state rerouted LRN 5 via Castro Valley Blvd/Mattox Road, bypassing Hayward and building a high-speed connector to Foothill Blvd. It was at this time that Maddox Road was widened to 100'. In 1933, the route was renumbered as part of US 50. It appears the US 48 routing was Dublin Road (Dublin Blvd) to Castro Valley Road, to Foothill Blvd, and then S on Mission Blvd. In 1930, with the renumbering to US 50, the routing changed to run N to Oakland.

Note that US 48 was originally proposed as US 42, but the number was changed to US 48 in 1926.

== Major intersections ==
This table refers to the route as it was in 1926.

County	Location	mi	km	Destinations	Notes
Santa Clara	San Jose	0	0.0	US 101	Southern terminus; Now former SR 82
Santa Clara	Milpitas	7.4	11.9	SR 237	
Alameda	Fremont	15.8	25.4	SR 21	Now I-680
Alameda	Hayward	30.0	48.3	MacArthur Boulevard	Now I-580 and former US 50 and I-5W
Alameda	Pleasanton	40.6	65.3	SR 21	Now I-680
San Joaquin		77.7	125.0	US 99W	Now I-5
San Joaquin	Lathrop	80.7	129.9	SR 120	
San Joaquin	French Camp	87.3	140.5	US 99E	Northern terminus: Now SR 99
1.000 mi = 1.609 km; 1.000 km = 0.621 mi

== See also ==
- U.S. Route 50 in California
