= Panama, California =

Unincorporated community in California, United States

Panama
- Unincorporated community
- Location in California Panama (the United States)
- Coordinates: 35°16′01″N 119°03′24″W
- Country: United States
- State: California
- County: Kern
- Elevation: 351 ft (107 m)

Panama, formerly named Rio Bravo after the Spanish name for the Kern River, Rio Bravo de San Felipe, is an unincorporated community in Kern County, California, United States. It is located 8 miles (13 km) south-southwest of Bakersfield, at an elevation of 351 feet (107 m) in the San Joaquin Valley.

A post office operated at Panama from 1874 to 1876.
