= List of highways numbered 99W =

The following roads have been numbered 99W:

== United States ==
- U.S. Route 99W (central California), Manteca to Stockton
- U.S. Route 99W (northern California), Sacramento to Red Bluff
- U.S. Route 99W (Oregon)
- Oregon Route 99W

== See also ==
- List of highways numbered 99E
