= List of highways numbered 99E =

The following roads have been numbered 99E:

== United States ==
- U.S. Route 99E (central California), Manteca to Stockton
- U.S. Route 99E (northern California), Sacramento to Red Bluff
- U.S. Route 99E (Oregon)
- Oregon Route 99E

== See also ==
- List of highways numbered 99W
