= East 14th Street =

East 14th Street is the part of 14th Street in Manhattan, New York east of Fifth Avenue.

East 14th Street may refer to:

- East 14th Street, a street in the East Bay of California, the portion of which going through Oakland was renamed International Boulevard
- East 14th Street, a street running through Midwood in Brooklyn, New York
- An historic area in Davenport, Iowa
