= Mission Boulevard =

The following roads are named Mission Boulevard:

- Mission Boulevard (East Bay, California) in the San Francisco East Bay Area, including:
  - the segment of California State Route 185 running from the unincorporated community of Ashland south to the City of Hayward
  - the segment of California State Route 238 running from Hayward south to Fremont
  - the entirety of California State Route 262 in Fremont
- Mission Boulevard (Southern California), a former routing of California State Route 60
