= El Camino Real (California) =

Commemorative route in California, United States

- The Royal Road
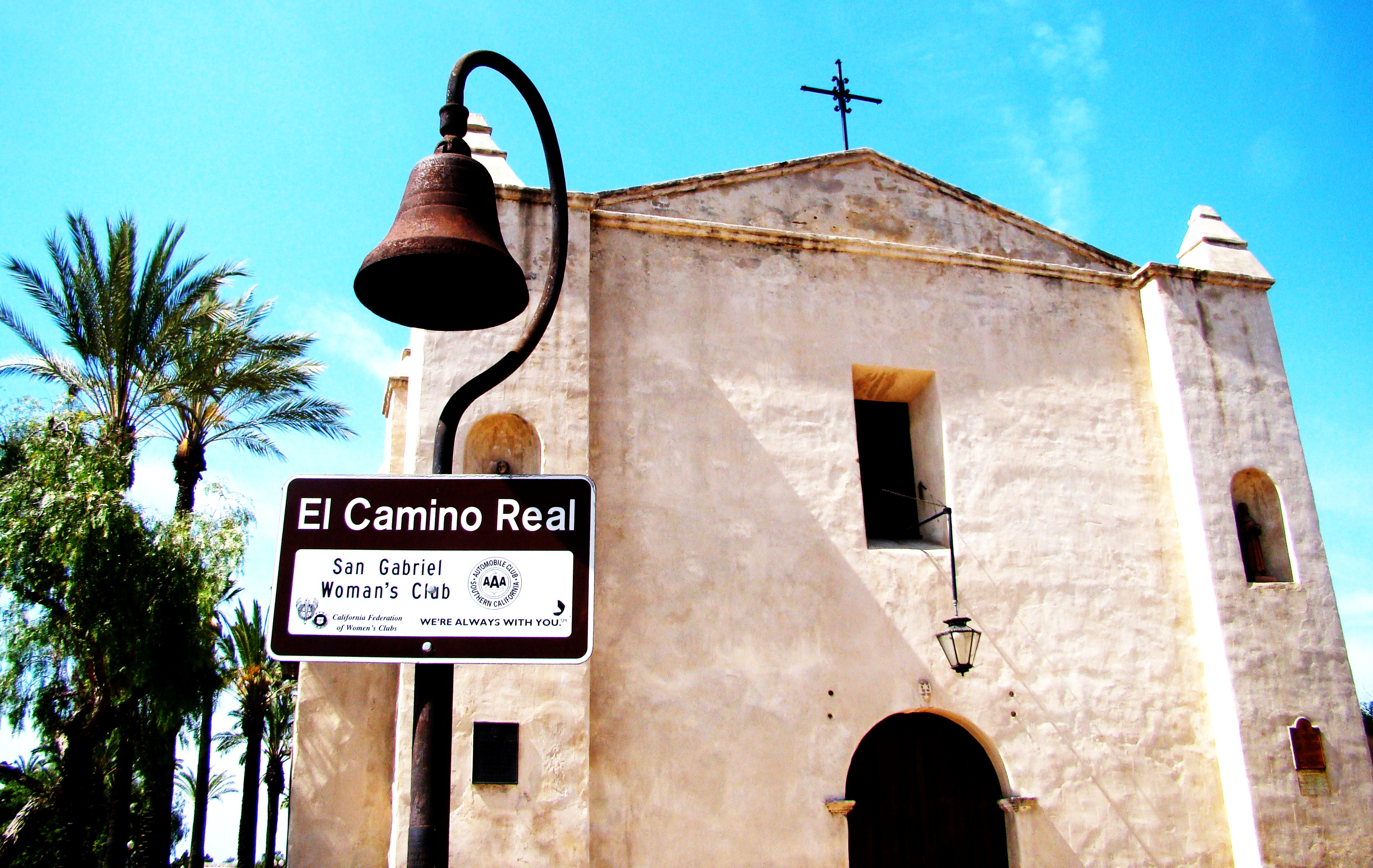
- East entrance of San Gabriel Mission with an El Camino Real bell

Historical route
- South end: Mission San Diego de Alcalá in San Diego
- North end: Mission San Francisco Solano in Sonoma

Modern official designation
- South end: I-5 at the Mexican border in San Diego
- North end: SR 12 in Sonoma

Location
- Country: United States
- State: California
- Counties: Main route: San Diego, Orange, Los Angeles, Ventura, Santa Barbara, San Luis Obispo, Monterey, San Benito, Santa Clara, San Mateo, San Francisco, Marin, Sonoma; East Bay route: Santa Clara, Alameda, Contra Costa

Highway system
- State highways in California; Interstate; US; State; Scenic; History; Pre‑1964; Unconstructed; Deleted; Freeways

California Historical Landmark
- Reference no.: 784

Interactive map of historic stops along the El Camino Real
Missions
Asistencias
Pueblos
Presidios

El Camino Real (Spanish; literally The Royal Road, sometimes translated as The King's Highway) is a 600-mile (965-kilometer) commemorative route connecting the 21 Spanish missions in California (formerly the region Alta California in the Spanish Empire) from Mission San Diego de Alcalá in San Diego to Mission San Francisco Solano in Sonoma, along with a number of sub-missions, four presidios, and three pueblos. The route is historically associated with a network of royal roads (caminos reales) used by inhabitants of New Spain. The modern commemorative route in the U.S. state of California is named after these roads, and is officially defined in the California Streets and Highways Code to run along various roads from Interstate 5 at the Mexican border to State Route 12 in Sonoma.

During the period of Spanish rule, there was no single road constructed by the Spanish to connect the missions, with most of the network of royal roads following historic Native American trading routes. These various caminos reales covered much of what is today California, but with no single special route designated to link the missions. The name was revived in the American era in connection with the boosterism associated with the Mission Revival movement of the early 20th century. Streets throughout California bear the "El Camino Real" name. The route has been continually upgraded and is decorated with commemorative bell markers.

== Spanish and Mexican era ==
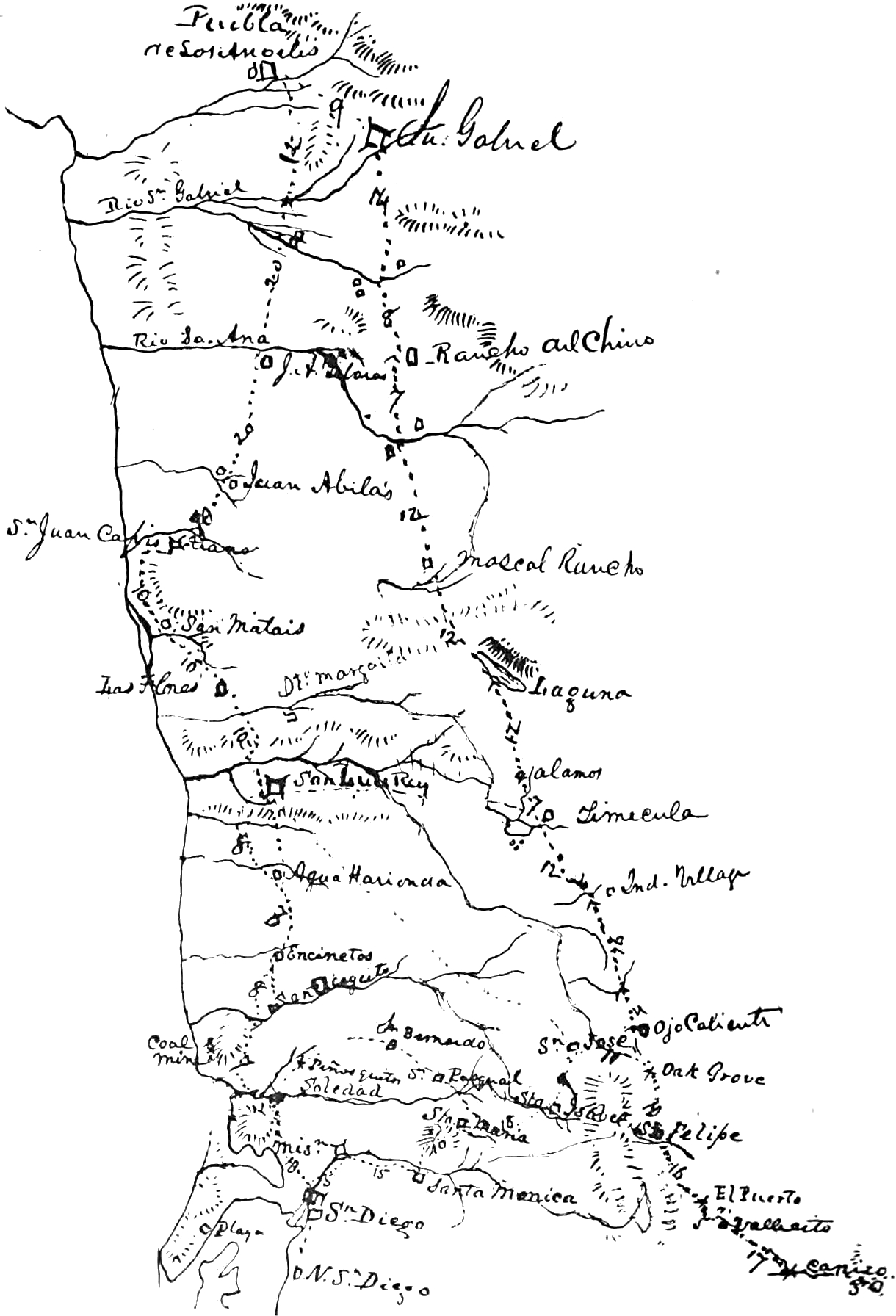
El Camino Real and Couts Path, drawn in 1850 by Cave J. Couts.

In earlier Spanish colonial times, any road under the direct jurisdiction of the Spanish crown and its viceroys was considered to be a camino real. Examples of such roads ran between principal settlements throughout Spain and its colonies such as New Spain. Most caminos reales had names apart from the appended camino real. Missions were present in Las Californias for decades before the establishment of any missions in what is today the U.S. state of California, with various Spanish missions established in present-day Baja California, Mexico, starting in 1697 with the Misión de Nuestra Señora de Loreto Conchó in present-day Loreto.

The Portolá expedition of 1769 included Franciscan missionaries, led by Junípero Serra. Starting from Loreto, Serra established the first of the 21 missions at San Diego. Serra stayed at San Diego and Juan Crespí continued the rest of the way with Gaspar de Portolá. Proceeding north, Portolá followed the coastline (today's California State Route 1), except where forced inland by coastal cliffs.

Eventually, the expedition was prevented from going farther north by the entrance to San Francisco Bay, the Golden Gate. Crespí identified several future mission sites which were not developed until later. On the return trip to San Diego, Gaspar de Portolá found a shorter detour around one stretch of coastal cliffs via Conejo Valley.

Portolá journeyed again from San Diego to Monterey in 1770, where Junipero Serra (who traveled by ship) founded the second mission (later moved a short distance south to Carmel). Carmel became Serra's Alta California mission headquarters.

The Juan Bautista de Anza expedition of (1775–76) entered Alta California from the southeast (crossing the Colorado River near today's Yuma, Arizona), and picked up Portolá's trail at Mission San Gabriel. De Anza's scouts found easier traveling in several inland valleys, rather than staying on the rugged coast. On his journey north, de Anza traveled the San Fernando Valley and Salinas Valley. After detouring to the coast to visit the Presidio of Monterey, de Anza went inland again, following the Santa Clara Valley to the southern end of San Francisco Bay and on up the east side of the San Francisco Peninsula.

Between 1683 and 1835, Jesuit and Franciscan missionaries established a series of religious outposts from today's Baja California and Baja California Sur into present-day California. Heavy freight and long-distance passenger movement was practical only via ships by a coastal water route.

While it is sometimes claimed that mission settlements were deliberately spaced approximately 30 miles (50 km) apart to facilitate overland travel via horseback during the Spanish era, this claim is not made in any historical sources and first appeared in 20th-century advertising materials encouraging automobile travel along the route. The missions are in fact spaced at highly variable intervals and do not reflect any particular planning. It is also traditionally claimed that the padres sprinkled mustard seeds along the trail to mark the windings of the trail's northward progress with bright yellow flowers, creating a golden trail stretching from San Diego to Sonoma, although this legend remains unverified.

Valuable seeds were brought to California also marking the Camino Real de Tierra Adentro with trees for different uses. For example, ash trees were the marker for where a spring was to be found, as seen to this day at the church of Nuestra Señora del Tránsito in Fresnillo, Zacatecas.

== American era ==
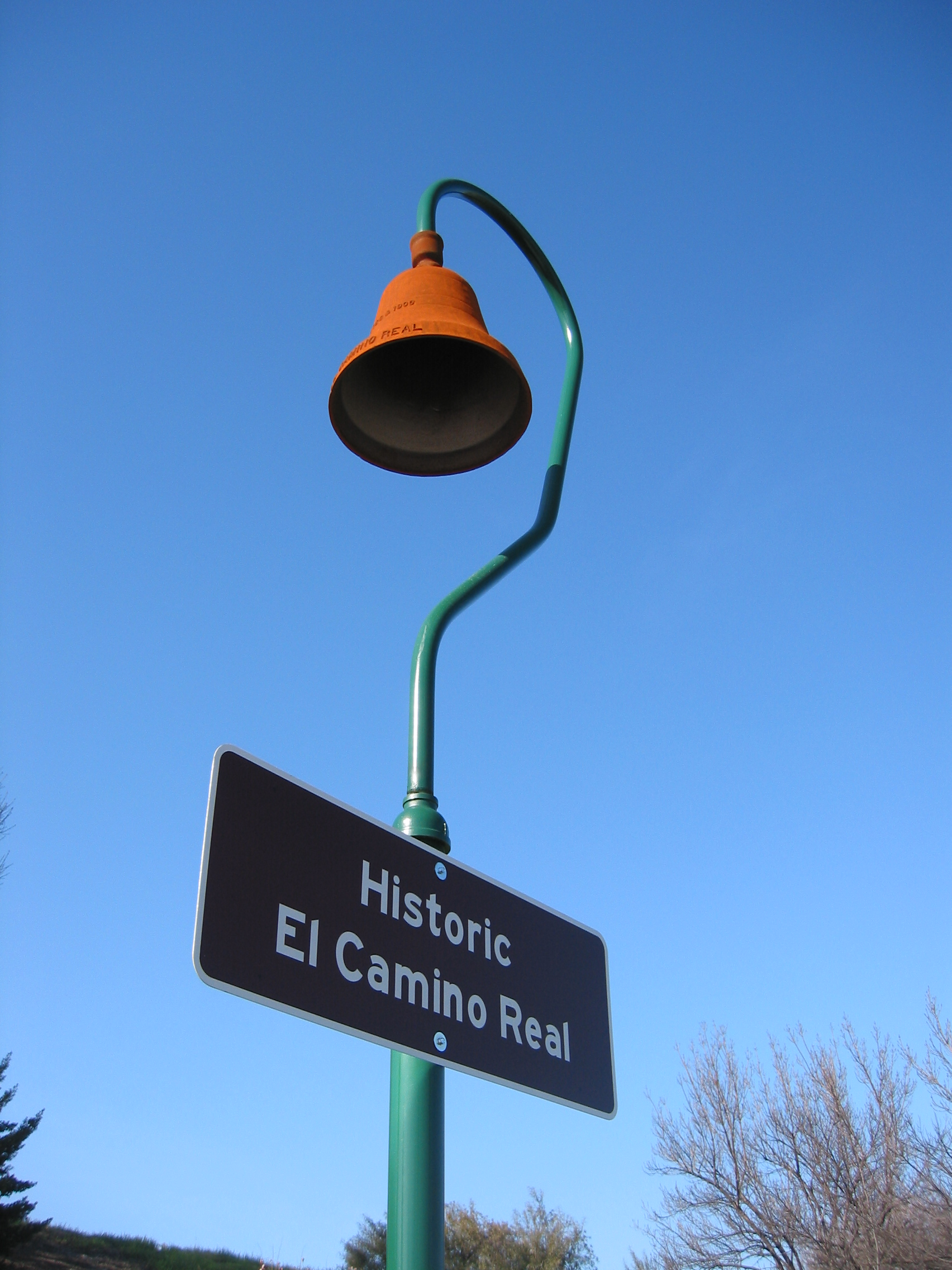
A historical marker situated along El Camino Real

By the mid-nineteenth century, when California became a state, the route had been improved in certain sections, but was wholly inadequate for large stagecoaches and freight wagons. In 1892, Anna Pitcher of Pasadena, California initiated an effort to establish a commemorative route which was adopted by the California Federation of Women's Clubs in 1902. In the early twentieth century, organizations and government agencies became interested in creating official designations or commemorations of roads and highways. Given the lack of standardized highway signs at the time, it was decided to place distinctive bells along the route, hung on supports in the form of an 11-foot (3.4 m) high shepherd's crook, also described as "a Franciscan walking stick". The bells were designed by Mrs. A. S. C. Forbes, who also owned the California Bell Company where they were cast. The first of 450 bells were unveiled on August 15, 1906, at the Plaza Church in the Pueblo near Olvera Street in Los Angeles.

A 1915 map produced by the Automobile Club of Southern California traced the route that connected the missions for motorists to follow. The club and associated groups cared for the bells from the mid-1920s through 1931 after the original organization which installed the bells fragmented. Distinctive route markers were added to U.S. Route 101 and other national auto trails when the joint board of state highway officials adopted the United States Numbered Highway System in 1926. The state highways forming El Camino Real were identified as Highway 1, U.S. Route 101 and Highway 82 on the San Francisco Peninsula in a 1959 law. Most of the bells eventually disappeared due to vandalism, theft or simple loss due to the relocation or rerouting of highways and roads. The State took over bell maintenance in 1933. After a reduction in the number of bells to around 80, the State began replacing them, at first with concrete, and later with iron. Justin Kramer took over the production of the bells in 1959. The California Department of Transportation (Caltrans) began a restoration effort in 1996.

Keith Robinson, Principal Landscape Architect at Caltrans developed an El Camino Real restoration program which resulted in the installation of 555 El Camino Real Bell Markers in 2005. The Bell Marker consists of a 460 mm diameter cast metal bell set atop a 75 mm diameter Schedule 40 pipe column that is attached to a concrete foundation using anchor rods. The original 1906 bell molds were used to fabricate the replacement bells. The bells are most typically marked 1769 & 1906, and include a designer's copyright notice. The two dates represent the date of the founding of the first Alta-California mission in San Diego, and the date of the setting of the first commemorative bell-marker, respectively. In 1997, the California Federation of Women's Clubs, in conjunction with California State Automobile Association, developed a restoration project as part of CalTrans "Adopt-a-Highway" program. Permits issued by Caltrans for installations along state routes have detailed specifications on how the bell should be set up for safety and legal considerations. The Caltrans were provided over two million dollars in grants categorized under Transportation Enhancements, a governmental program that aims to symbolize and preserve cultural, ecologically beneficial, and various aesthetic aspects of the land surrounding transportation routes.

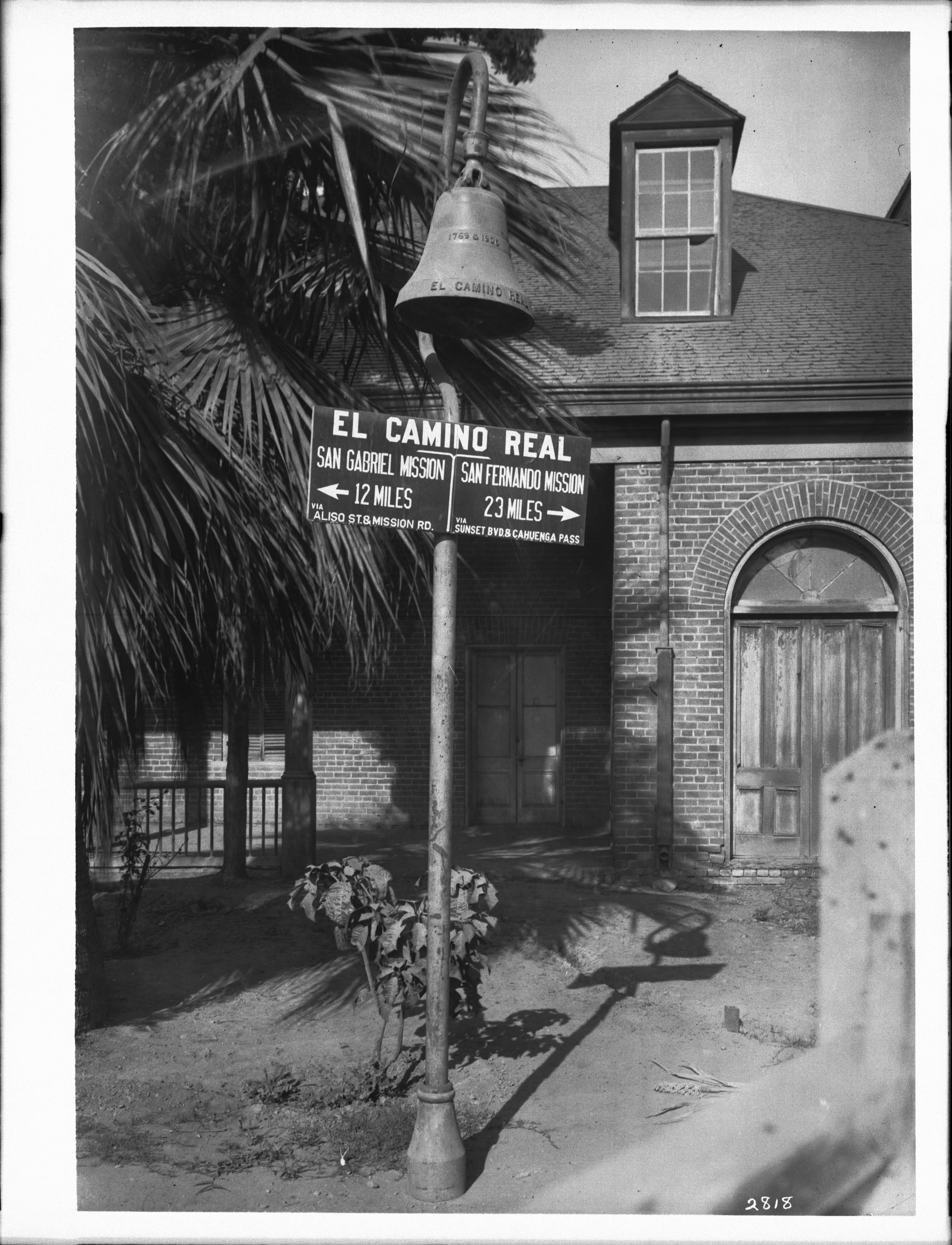
One of the commemorative bells, placed at El Pueblo de Los Ángeles Historical Monument with wayfinding markers to Mission San Fernando and Mission San Gabriel

For some indigenous populations, the bells are painful symbols of the dehumanization of their ancestors, together with the domination and erasure of their culture. The Amah Mutsun tribal band shared with local authorities how the bells represent historical injustices and oppression of their people, such as the punishment endured for missing a ring of the bell. In response, a bell at the University of California, Santa Cruz was removed by campus officials in June 2019. The issue was also present when the statues of Junípero Serra were damaged and/or removed in 2020 during the George Floyd protests which expanded to include monuments of individuals associated with the impact of the genocide of indigenous peoples in the Americas. The historical preservation commission of Santa Cruz reported to the city council in November 2020 that the bells represent a painful history for the indigenous people of the city, and noted that a bell in Mission Park Plaza had been stolen in 1999 and not replaced. Santa Cruz scheduled the removal of the last bell in the city, at the intersection of Soquel and Dakota avenues, for August 28, 2021, but the bell was stolen the night before it was to be removed. The Tribal Band, an organization of local tribes, led a ceremony to mark the occasion in spite of the theft.

== Modern highway and street routes ==
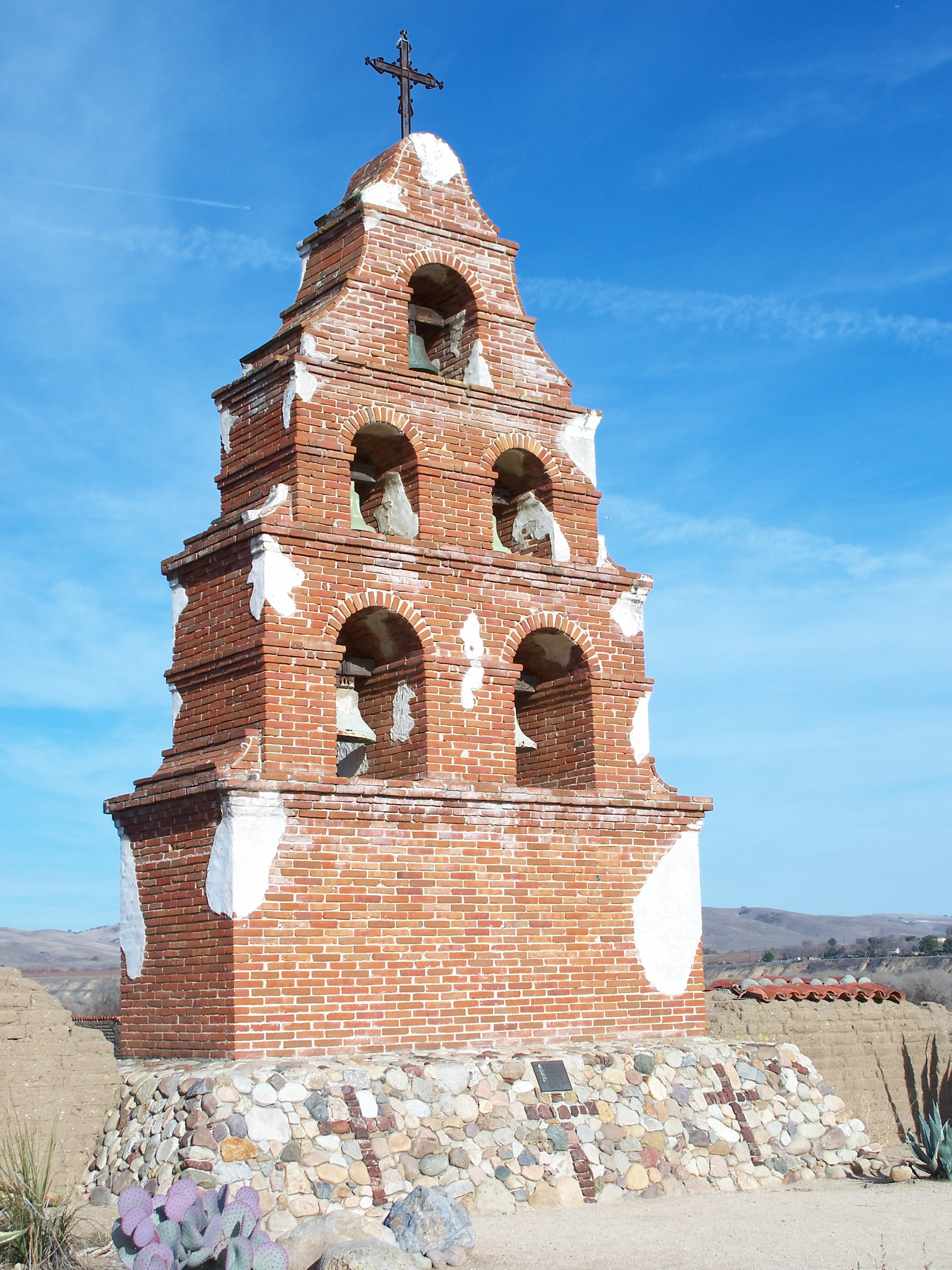
Mission San Miguel as seen from the road while driving the "commemorative route" of the Camino Real

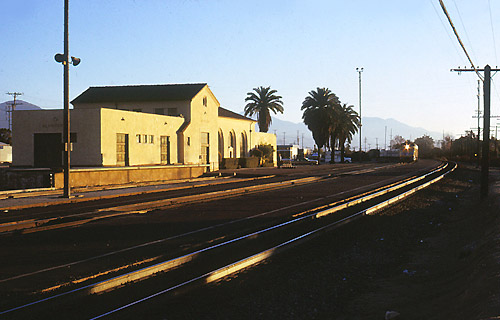
Alhambra station along Mission Road in Alhambra in 1973

Several modern highways include parts of the commemorative route, though large sections are on city streets (for instance, most of the stretch between San Jose and San Francisco). The full route as defined in section 635, subdivision (b) of the California Streets and Highways Code is as follows:

Destinations	Notes
Interstate 5	U.S.-Mexico border to Anaheim
Anaheim Boulevard, Harbor Boulevard, State Route 72 and Whittier Boulevard	Anaheim to Whittier
Valley Boulevard in El Monte to Mission Drive in Rosemead; Mission Drive in Rosemead to East Mission Road in San Gabriel; East Mission Road in San Gabriel to West Mission Road in Alhambra (at the San Gabriel Mission); West Mission Road in Alhambra to Alhambra Avenue in Los Angeles; Alhambra Avenue in Los Angeles to Valley Boulevard in Los Angeles; Valley Boulevard in Los Angeles to U.S. Route 101	Whittier to Los Angeles
U.S. Route 101	Los Angeles to San Jose
State Route 87	within San Jose
State Route 82	San Jose to San Francisco
Interstate 280	San Francisco
U.S. Route 101	San Francisco to Novato
State Route 37	Novato to Sears Point
State Route 121	Sears Point to Sonoma
State Route 12	Sonoma

East Bay route

Destinations	Notes
State Route 87	within San Jose
State Route 92	San Jose to Fremont
State Route 238	Fremont to Hayward
State Route 185	Hayward to Oakland
State Route 123	Oakland to San Pablo (continued to Martinez)

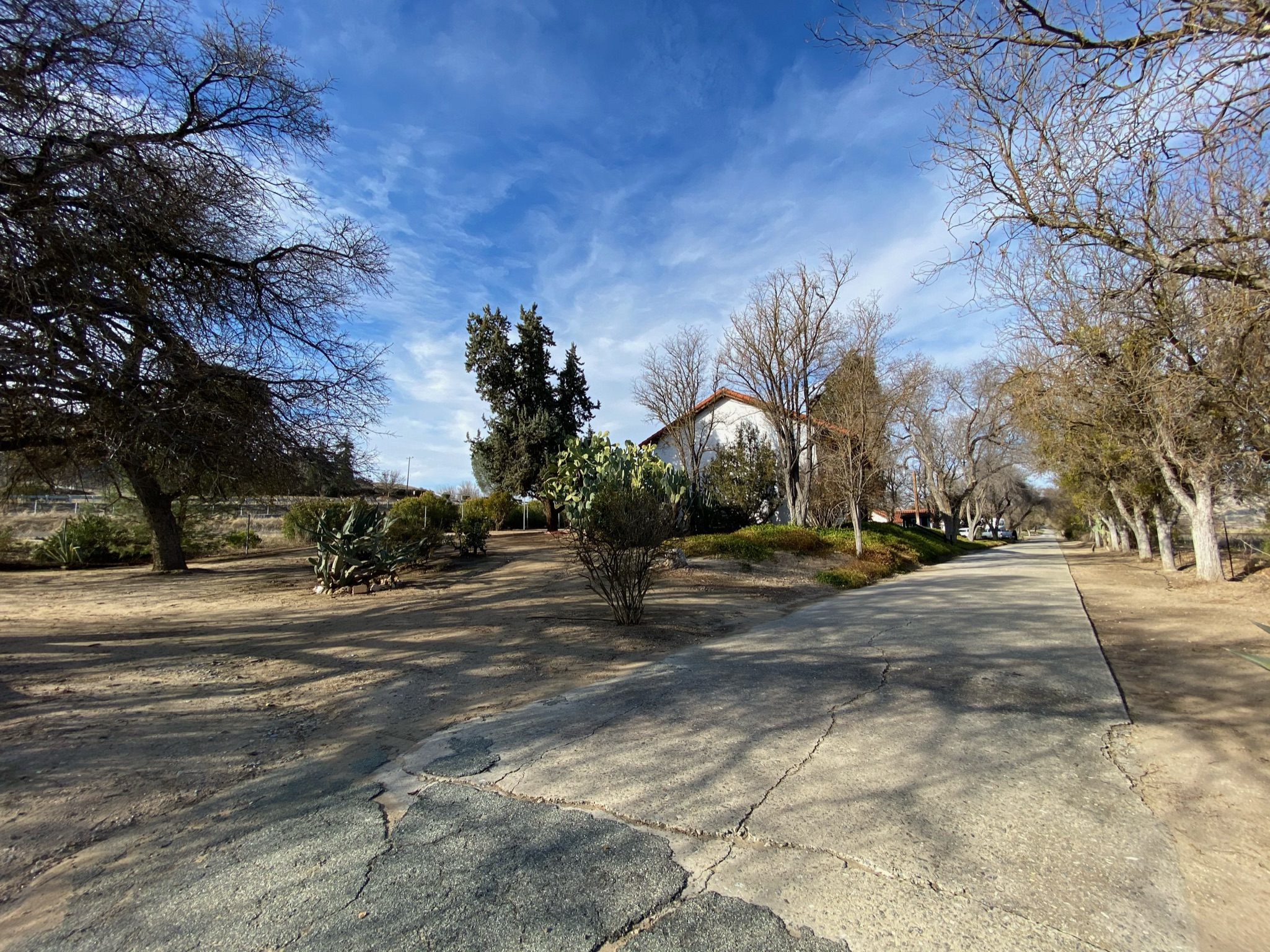
Stretch of El Camino Real at Rios-Caledonia Adobe San Miguel

Some older local roads that parallel these routes also have the name. Mission Street in San Francisco does correspond to the commemorative route. An unpaved stretch of the old road has been preserved just east of Mission San Juan Bautista; this section of road runs parallel to the San Andreas Fault, which can be clearly seen where the ground drops several feet. Many streets throughout California bear the name of the road, often with scant relation to the original.

A section of the old mission road, El Camino Real fronts the Rios-Caledonia Adobe in San Miguel. This road served stagecoaches and then was paved as part of the original US 101 highway.

The route through the San Mateo and Santa Clara counties is designated as State Route 82, and some stretches of it are named El Camino Real. The old road is part of the de Anza route, located a few miles west of Route 101.

== Historic designations ==
El Camino Real is designated as California Historical Landmark #784. There are two state historical markers honoring the road: one located near Mission San Diego de Alcalá in San Diego and the other one near Mission San Francisco de Asís in San Francisco.

== See also ==
- El Camino Real de los Tejas
- El Camino Viejo, another north-south trail in colonial California
- History of California
