= AC Transit =

Public transit operator in Alameda County and Contra Costa County, California

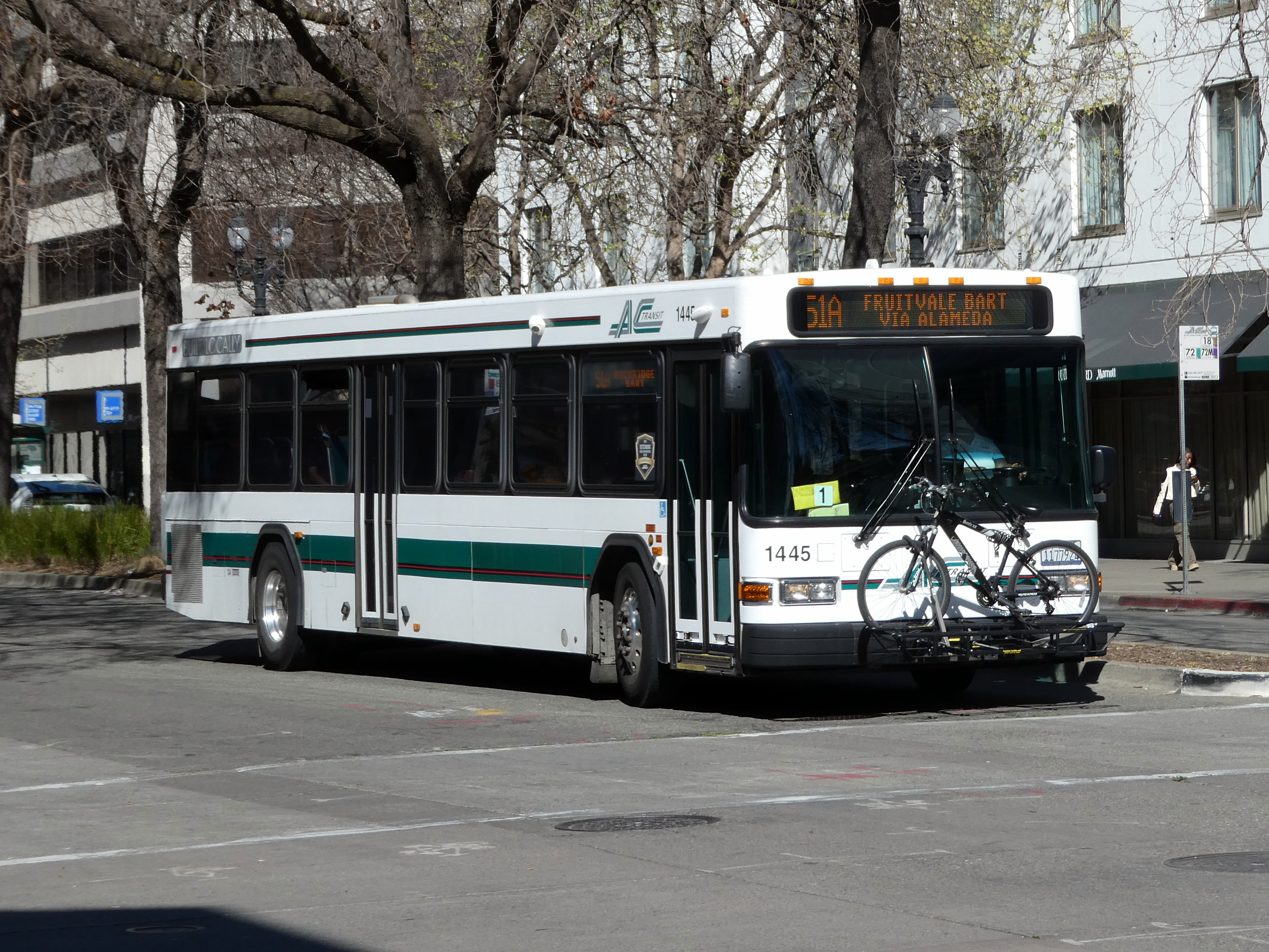
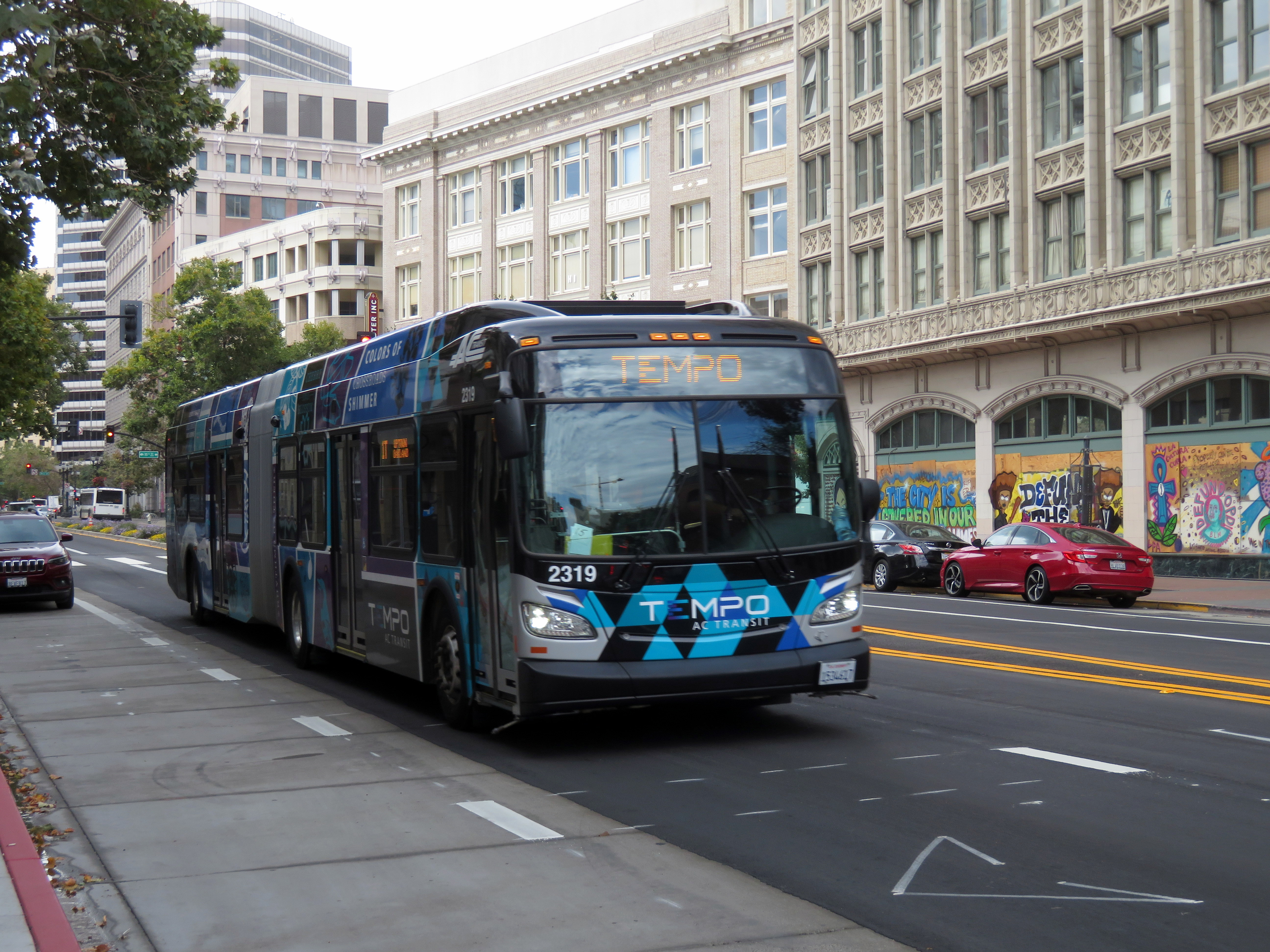
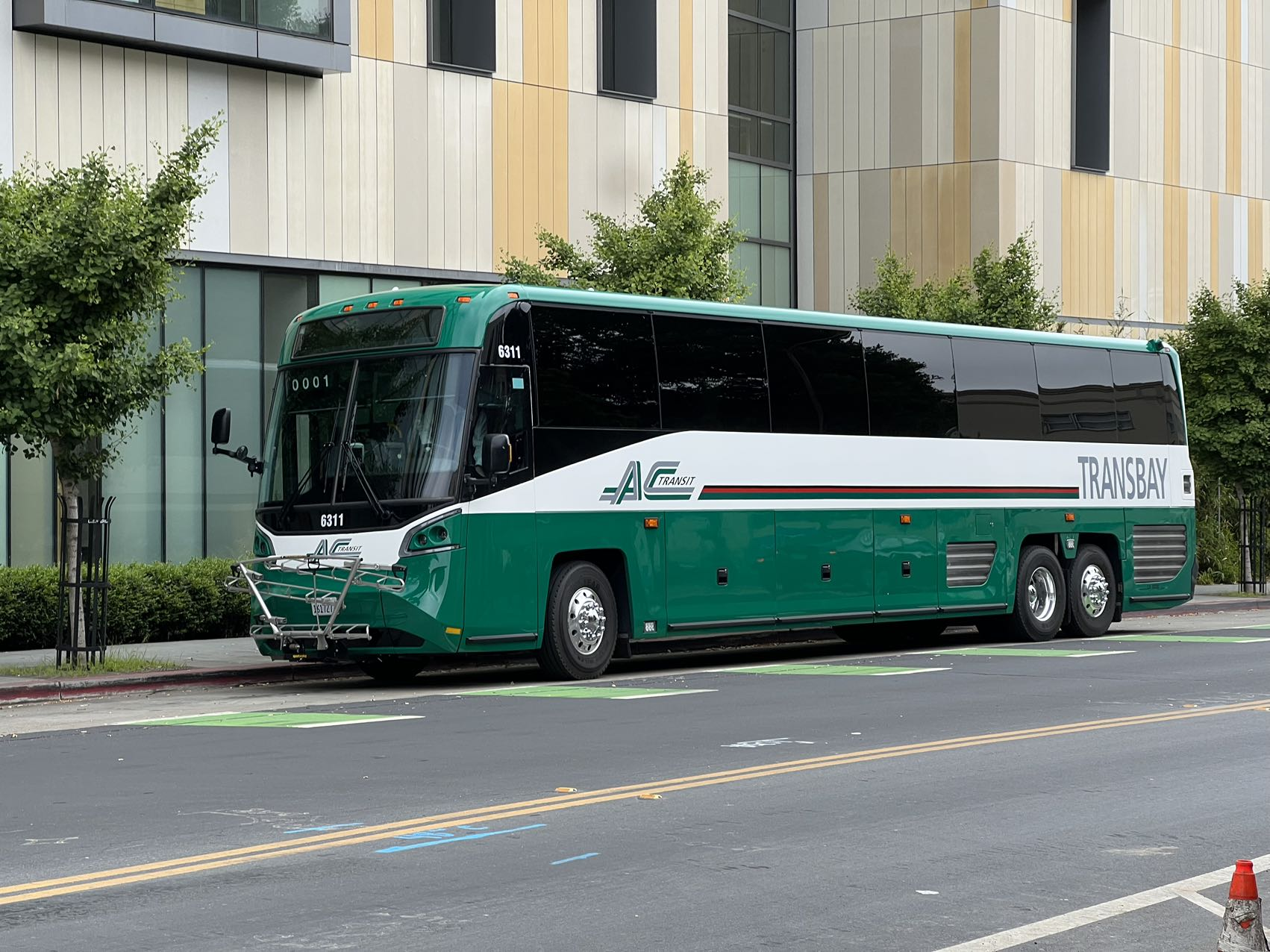
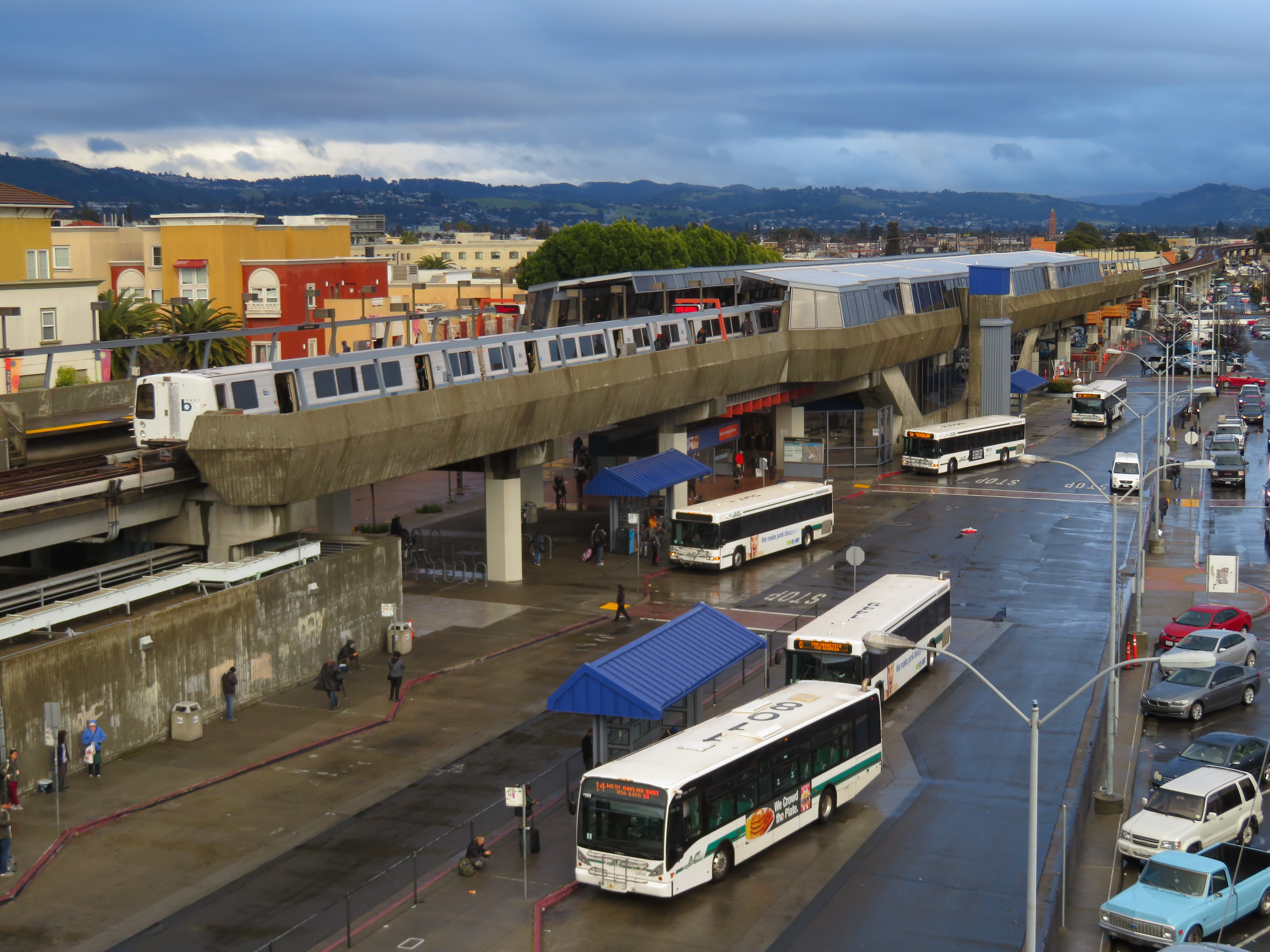
- Top left to bottom right: Local, Tempo, and Transbay buses, and Fruitvale station bus terminal
- Founded: 1960
- Headquarters: 1600 Franklin St, Oakland, CA
- Locale: East Bay
- Service area: Western Alameda and Contra Costa counties
- Service type: Bus; Bus rapid transit; Paratransit; Night bus
- Routes: 130
- Stops: approx. 5,500
- Fleet: 630
- Daily ridership: 164,800 (weekdays, Q2 2026)
- Annual ridership: 40,408,900 (2025)
- Website: actransit.org

AC Transit is the main bus transit operator in the East Bay region of the San Francisco Bay Area, California. AC Transit is the third largest bus operator in California, serving the western portions of Alameda and Contra Costa counties, with a fleet of over 600 buses operating 130 routes. The agency was founded in 1960 as the successor of the bankrupt Key System.

AC Transit's primary services are its local bus routes, which serve the entire East Bay region from Richmond to Milpitas; "Transbay" regional routes, most of which operate between the East Bay and San Francisco via the Bay Bridge; and the Tempo bus rapid transit line from Oakland to San Leandro.

AC Transit has its headquarters in Oakland, with four bus operations facilities throughout the East Bay and a control center in Emeryville. The agency is officially known as the Alameda-Contra Costa Transit District, and it is structured as a special district governed by an elected seven-member board of directors. In 2025, AC Transit had a ridership of 40,408,900, or about 164,800 per weekday in the second quarter of 2026.

== Services ==
AC Transit operates four main brands of bus services: local, Transbay, Tempo, and Rapid. The agency also operates paratransit services for customers with disabilities and special school services to middle and high schools.

Local services operate throughout the agency's entire service area, which consists of much of the East Bay region, extending north to Richmond and south to Milpitas in Santa Clara County. All local lines connect to regional transit services, with most lines serving BART stations.

Transbay lines operate across the San Francisco Bay, providing regional service from the East Bay to the San Francisco Peninsula. Most lines operate from the East Bay to the Salesforce Transit Center in San Francisco, with frequent service during weekday commute hours. Select lines operate all day, 7 days per week. Transbay service is the successor to regional rail lines operated by the Key System, which operated direct streetcar service from the East Bay to the former Transbay Terminal via rail infrastructure on the Bay Bridge.

Tempo is a limited-stop bus service on International Boulevard, with elements of bus rapid transit. Tempo buses operate in dedicated lanes on part of the route, serving bus stops located in the median of the street, and using uniquely-branded buses with doors on both sides. Tempo is listed in AC Transit schedules as route 1T, and operates 24/7 from the Uptown Transit Center at 19th St/Oakland BART station to San Leandro BART station.

Rapid is AC Transit's brand for its limited-stop bus services, which was introduced in 2003 with line 72R on San Pablo Avenue. AC Transit's second Rapid service, line 1R on International Boulevard, was discontinued in 2016 and fully replaced by Tempo bus rapid transit service in 2020. As of 2025, AC Transit has proposed Rapid services for the Telegraph Avenue and Grand Avenue corridors.

East Bay Paratransit is a joint venture of AC Transit and BART to provide paratransit service in the East Bay, in compliance with the Americans with Disabilities Act. East Bay Paratransit serves customers who cannot use regular bus or train service due to a disability. Paratransit service is operated by Transdev.

AC Transit operates supplemental school services to middle and high schools within its service area. Some school service is provided by regular local routes with minor modifications, and other schools are served by dedicated routes numbered in the 600s. Unlike traditional school bus services provided by school districts, AC Transit supplemental school services are open to the public with the payment of regular fares, and are operated with standard transit buses. School services are funded by school districts, which has at times caused conflict between the transit agency and the school districts over the cost and schedules of the services.

=== Regional connections ===
AC Transit forms part of the regional public transit network in the San Francisco Bay Area, and accepts the regional Clipper card for fare payment. AC Transit buses serve 23 BART stations in the agency's East Bay service area, and connect to multiple local transit operators including MUNI, Golden Gate Transit, and VTA. AC Transit also connects to regional and national transportation networks, with services to Oakland San Francisco Bay Airport and connections to Amtrak and San Francisco Bay Ferry services.

AC Transit operates 24/7 service on 7 key routes in the regional All Nighter network, with a central hub in downtown Oakland.

AC Transit also operates multiple lines of the regional BART Early Bird Express network, which provides supplemental early-morning commuter service along BART lines in the 4:00 AM hour, before BART trains begin operating in the 5:00 hour. The BART Early Bird Express service was introduced in 2019 to replace cancelled early-morning BART trains, which were eliminated to provide time for additional maintenance to the Transbay Tube.

=== Routes ===
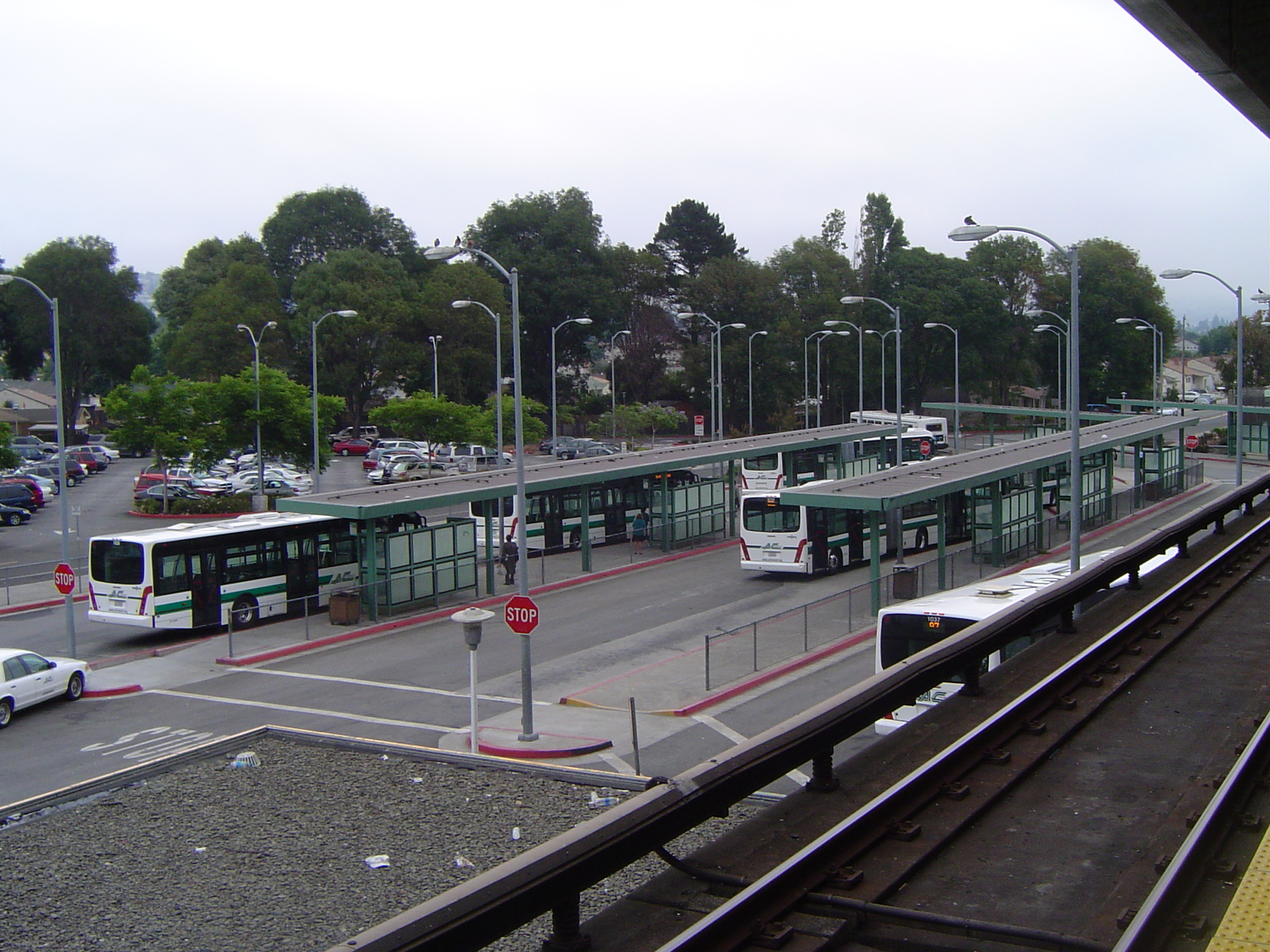
AC Transit buses at Bay Fair BART Station

As of September 2024, AC Transit operates 130 routes, which includes 60 local and Rapid lines, 15 Transbay lines, 6 All Nighter routes, and 45 special school routes.

== Fares ==
The standard fare for AC Transit local services is $2.75 with cash, and $2.25 with the agency's mobile app or the Clipper card. Transbay services have a higher fare of $6. Daily, weekly, and monthly passes are available for both local and Transbay services, and reduced fares are available for children, seniors, and individuals with disabilities.

AC Transit offers fare capping in addition to its daily, weekly, and monthly passes, allowing customers to earn a pass by paying single fares. Clipper card users are eligible for a daily fare cap of $5 on local services, and users of the AC Transit mobile app can also earn weekly and monthly passes.

== History ==
Voters created the Alameda-Contra Costa Transit District (AC Transit) in 1956 and subsequently approved a $16.5 million bond issue in 1959 enabling the District to buy out the failing privately owned Key System Transit Lines. In October 1960, AC Transit's service began. The new District built up the bus fleet with 250 new buses, extended service into new neighborhoods, created an intercity express bus network, and increased Bay Bridge bus service.

Numerous AC Transit routes were modified in 1972–73 to serve the new BART system. AC Transit began operating express service connecting BART terminals with outer suburban points under contract to BART on December 2, 1974. With BART operating, suburban municipalities began contracting with AC Transit to operate local bus service. Service began in Fremont on November 12, 1974; in Newark on December 16, 1974; in Concord on September 8, 1975; in Pleasant Hill on December 8, 1975; in Moraga and Orinda on September 13, 1976; and in Antioch and Pittsburg (as Tri Delta Transit under contract to the Eastern Contra Costa Transit Authority) on June 5, 1977. The lines in central Contra Costa County (County Connection) were transferred to the new Central Contra Costa Transit Authority in June 1982. Tri-Delta Transit switched to a different operator in 1984.

In 2003, the District introduced a San Mateo-Hayward Bridge route. Designated as Line M, the service connected the BART stations of Castro Valley and Hayward with Foster City and San Mateo's Hillsdale Caltrain station. A second San Mateo-Hayward Bridge route, Line MA, was added in 2006 and discontinued in 2007. In 2004, the District began service on Line U across the Dumbarton Bridge, connecting Stanford University with ACE and BART trains in Fremont. As part of a consortium of transit agencies (including AC Transit, BART, SamTrans, Union City Transit, and VTA), the District already operated Dumbarton Express bus service across the Dumbarton Bridge.

On June 30, 2003, a new "rapid bus" line operating on San Pablo Avenue was introduced. Designated as Line 72R (or San Pablo Rapid), the service connected Oakland with Richmond and operated at faster speeds than regular local service due to wide stop spacing and signal priority treatments.

Beginning December 10, 2005, AC Transit began participating in the regional All Nighter network, providing 24-hour bus service throughout its service area to supplement BART service, which does not operate during owl hours. AC Transit had provided 24-hour service on many of its trunk lines prior to this date, except in the late 1990s due to budget limitations.

On December 13, 2013, AC Transit adopted a new fare policy that brought changes to the transit system July 2014, including a new day pass that is in line with other transit agencies including VTA and SamTrans. The policy is also designed to speed boarding and help keep buses on schedule, provide greater convenience and value for customers, and encourage more customers to switch to Clipper

== Rapid Bus and Bus Rapid Transit ==
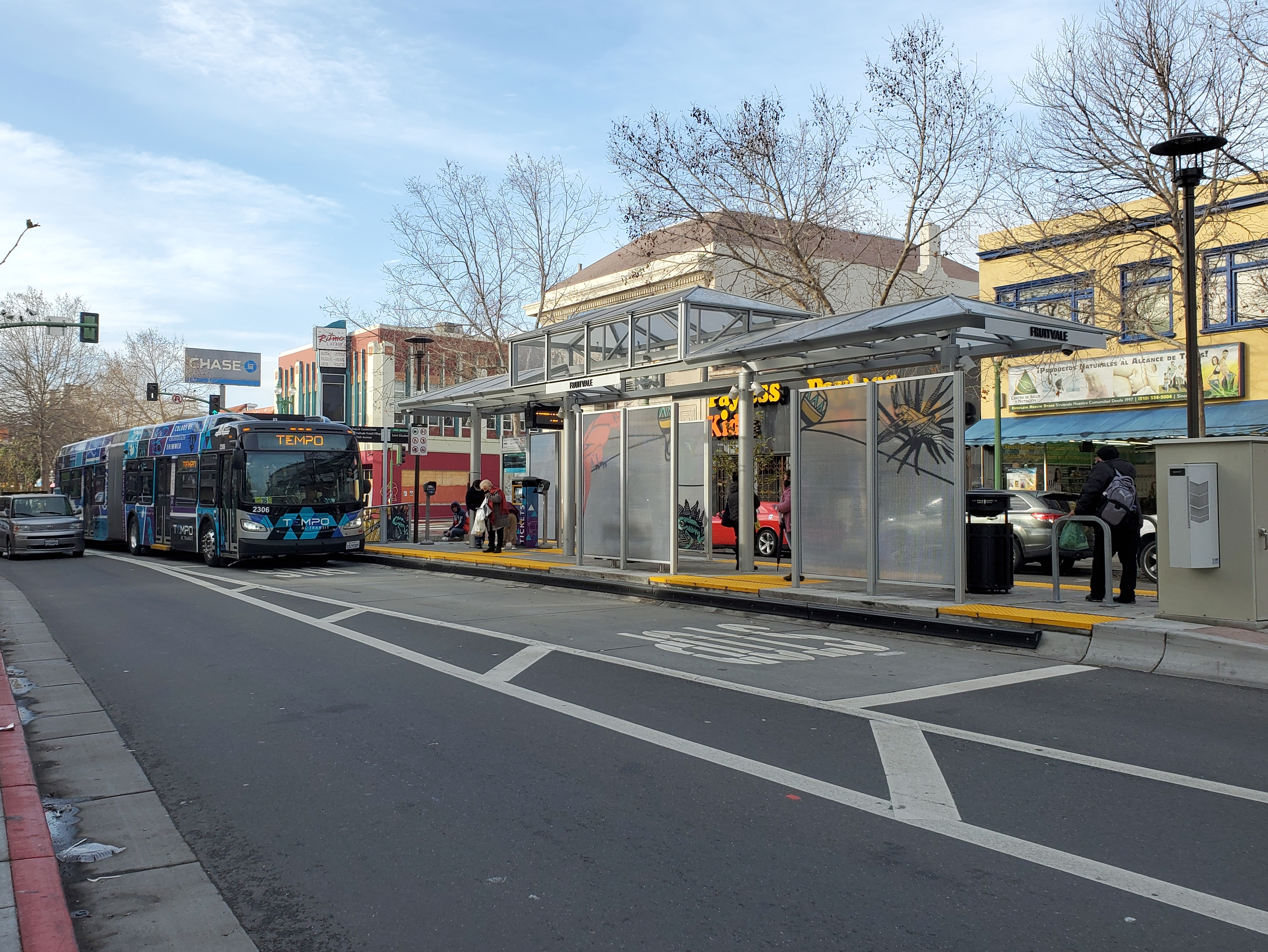
Tempo bus in Fruitvale, 2021

A rapid bus line was introduced on San Pablo Avenue on June 30, 2003. Designated as Line 72R (or San Pablo Rapid), it operates from 6 am to 7 pm at 12-minute intervals on weekdays, and 7 am to 7 pm at 15-minute intervals on weekends and holidays. Bus stops are spaced 2/3-mile apart on average, running between Jack London Square (via 20th Street and Broadway) in Oakland and Contra Costa College in San Pablo, and buses receive signal priority at several intersections. Although the line does have scheduled timepoints en route, most buses typically travel along the route as fast (or as slow) as traffic allows.

Line 1R (or International Rapid) operated on weekdays between Berkeley Way and Oxford Street in Berkeley and Bay Fair BART station in San Leandro, mainly along Telegraph Avenue, International Boulevard, and East 14th Street. Weekend and holiday service operated between Downtown Oakland and San Leandro only.

Line 1R was discontinued in 2016. On August 9, 2020, the 1R was largely replaced by Tempo, AC Transit's new Bus Rapid Transit (BRT) route. Tempo operates between the Uptown Transit Center and the San Leandro BART station via International Boulevard and East 14th Street. It features 46 brand new platform stations (curbside and center-median) with dedicated bus lanes along the majority of the route. The Telegraph Avenue alignment of the 1R between the Uptown Transit Center and U.C. Berkeley is currently being served by local route 6.

== Bus fleet ==
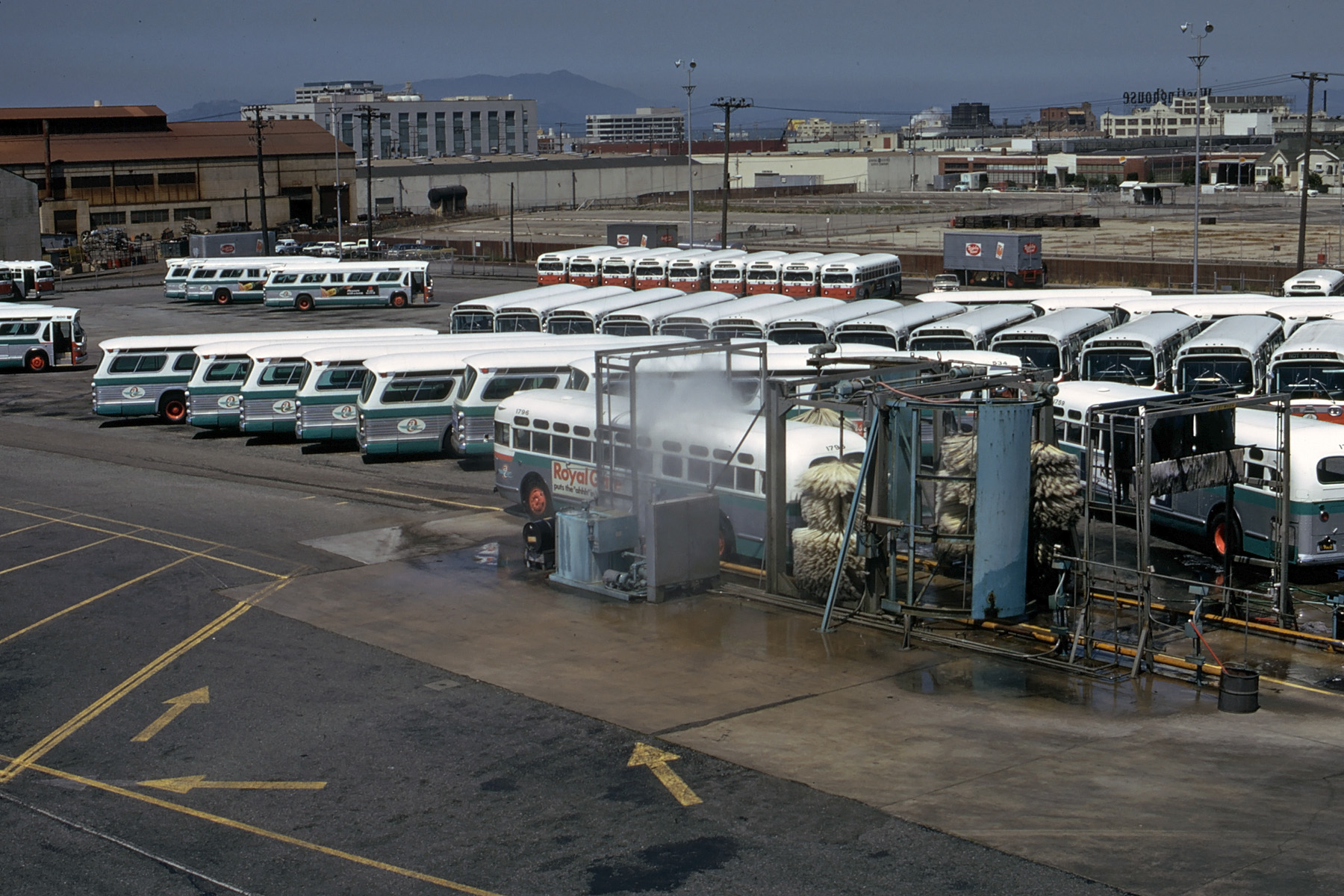
Mixed "old-look" and New Look buses from GM at the Seminary Division bus wash

At its inception, AC Transit purchased the mixed White, Mack, and GM "old-look" bus fleet from its predecessor, the Key System. The ex-Key System buses were repainted in "clownface" livery, featuring a predominantly white (upper half) and orange (lower front) color scheme with teal side stripes, and AC Transit adopted a "wing" logo featuring the same colors. After its inception, the first new AC Transit orders were for GM New Look buses, which the agency advertised as "Transit Liners". AC Transit began New Look operation in late 1960. AC Transit would continue to operate a mixed fleet of buses throughout the 1960s.

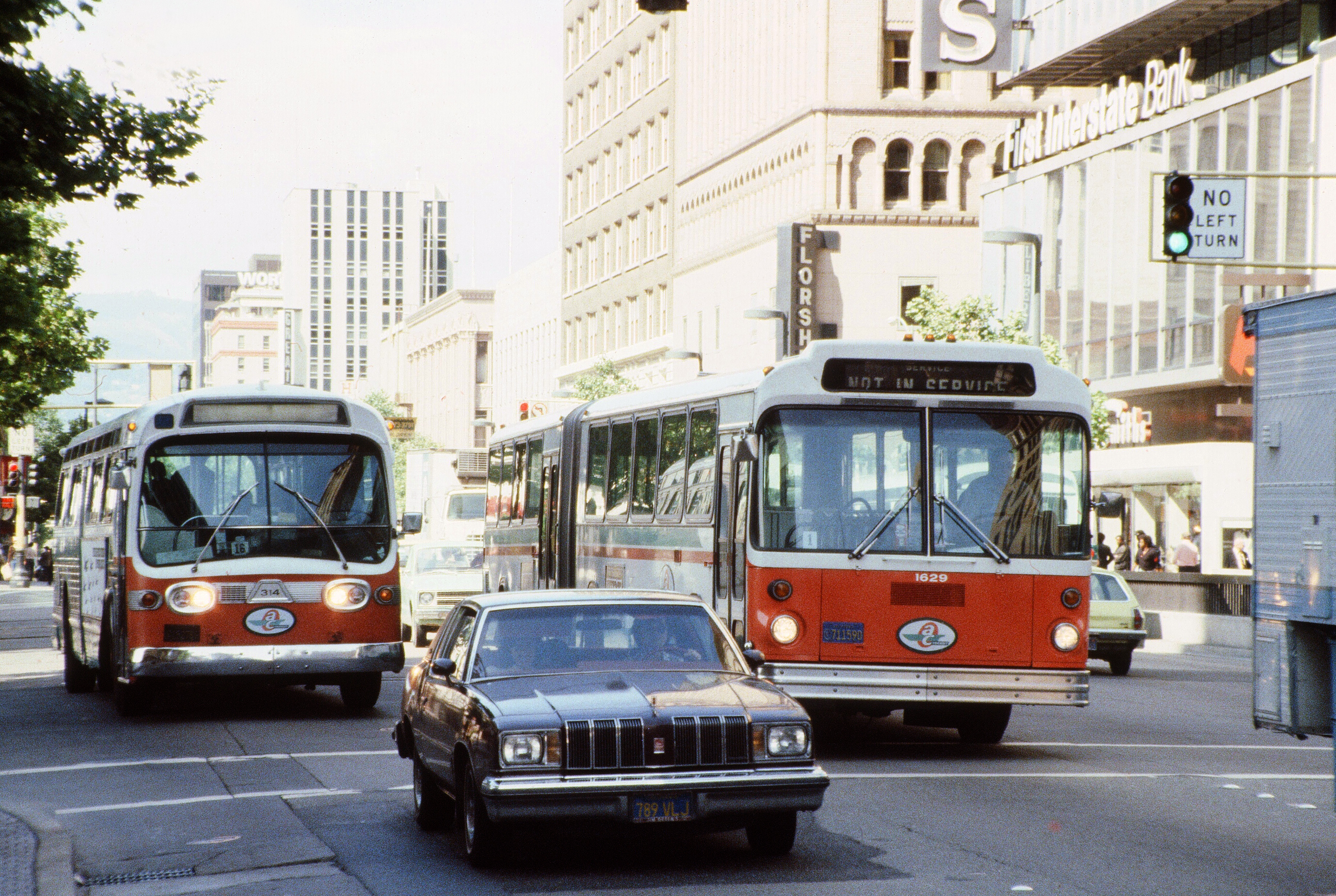
GM New Look and AM General/M.A.N. SG-220 buses, ca. 1980s

AC Transit also pioneered the use of articulated buses in the United States; in March 1966 it was the first transit agency to use the Super Golden Eagle long-distance coach (originally designed and built for Continental Trailways; AC Transit designated it XMC-77 and called it the "Freeway Train"), primarily on Transbay service. By 1970, AC Transit was one of six agencies to participate in a "super bus project" coordinated by the National Transportation Center (Pittsburgh) to write a specification for a higher-capacity bus; once the specification had been written, two prototypes would be built and tested to select a winner for a large group procurement of 100 buses to keep per-unit costs low. Two European-built articulated buses were tested in the summer of 1974: a Volvo B58, and a MAN SG 192. Riders received the M.A.N. bus favorably, and the specification was released for bid in 1975; AC Transit placed an order for 30 buses in 1976 and deliveries began from the AM General/M.A.N. joint venture in 1978.

For its rigid buses, AC Transit continued purchasing GM New Look buses through the early 1970s, then switched to purchasing Flxible New Look buses starting in 1974. Since the early 1980s, AC Transit began acquiring buses from Flyer, Neoplan, and Gillig. Around this time, AC Transit began ordering new buses in a "stripe" color scheme, featuring the same orange, teal, and white colors as the previous "clownface" livery. In the late 1990s, AC Transit added buses from NABI. AC Transit supplemented these buses with a fleet of 45-foot over-the-road coaches purchased from Motor Coach Industries beginning in the early 2000s.

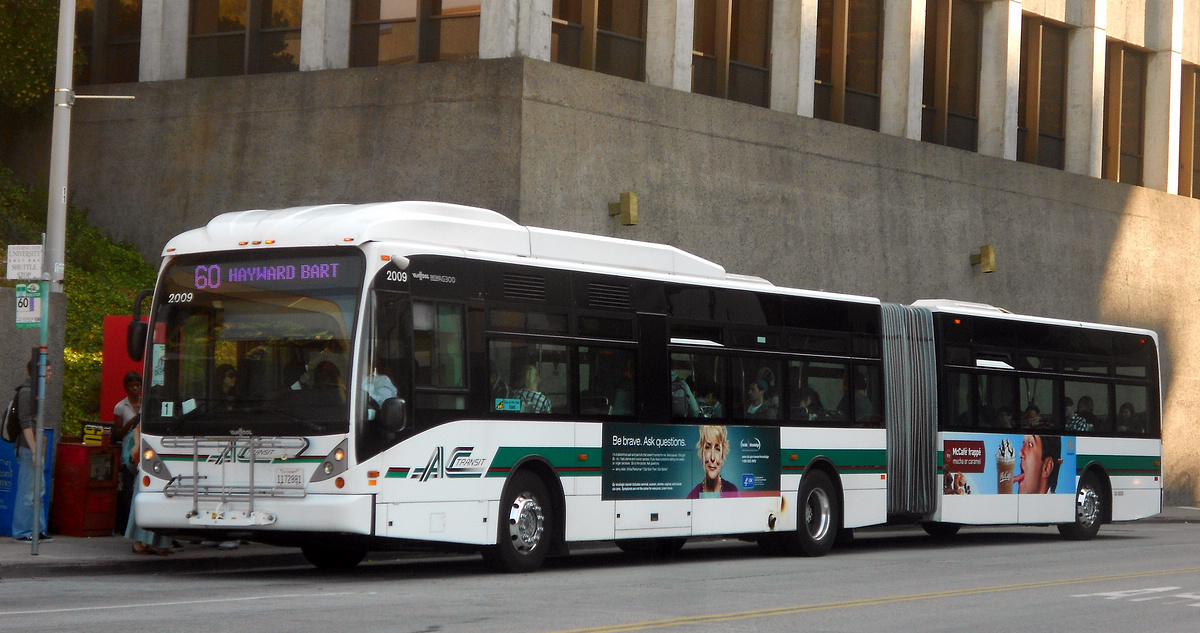
Van Hool AG300

In 2003, AC Transit began purchasing low-floor buses from Van Hool. The Van Hool buses were assembled in Belgium and featured low floors and three doors (four doors on articulated models), which AC Transit touted as the key to bus rapid transit service between Berkeley and San Leandro along Shattuck, Telegraph, International Blvd, and East 14th Street. At the same time, AC Transit rolled out a revised "ribbon" livery featuring new colors (green and black), and a new logo. The logo was simplified in 2014.

After criticism over the use of federal funds to purchase foreign-made Van Hool buses and the tailoring of specification requirements to exclude domestic manufacturers, AC Transit ordered locally-built Gillig buses in 2012. In March 2013, AC Transit began operating the first of its new Gillig buses. In August of the same year, AC Transit placed the first of its new New Flyer Xcelsior articulated buses into service. Later that year, in November 2013, new Gillig buses with a suburban seating configuration and Transbay branding were introduced into service.

All AC Transit buses are wheelchair accessible and have front-mounted bicycle racks. The MCI buses also feature luggage bay bicycle racks. AC Transit buses purchased after 2007 have air conditioning, as approved by the board of directors.

=== Alternative power ===
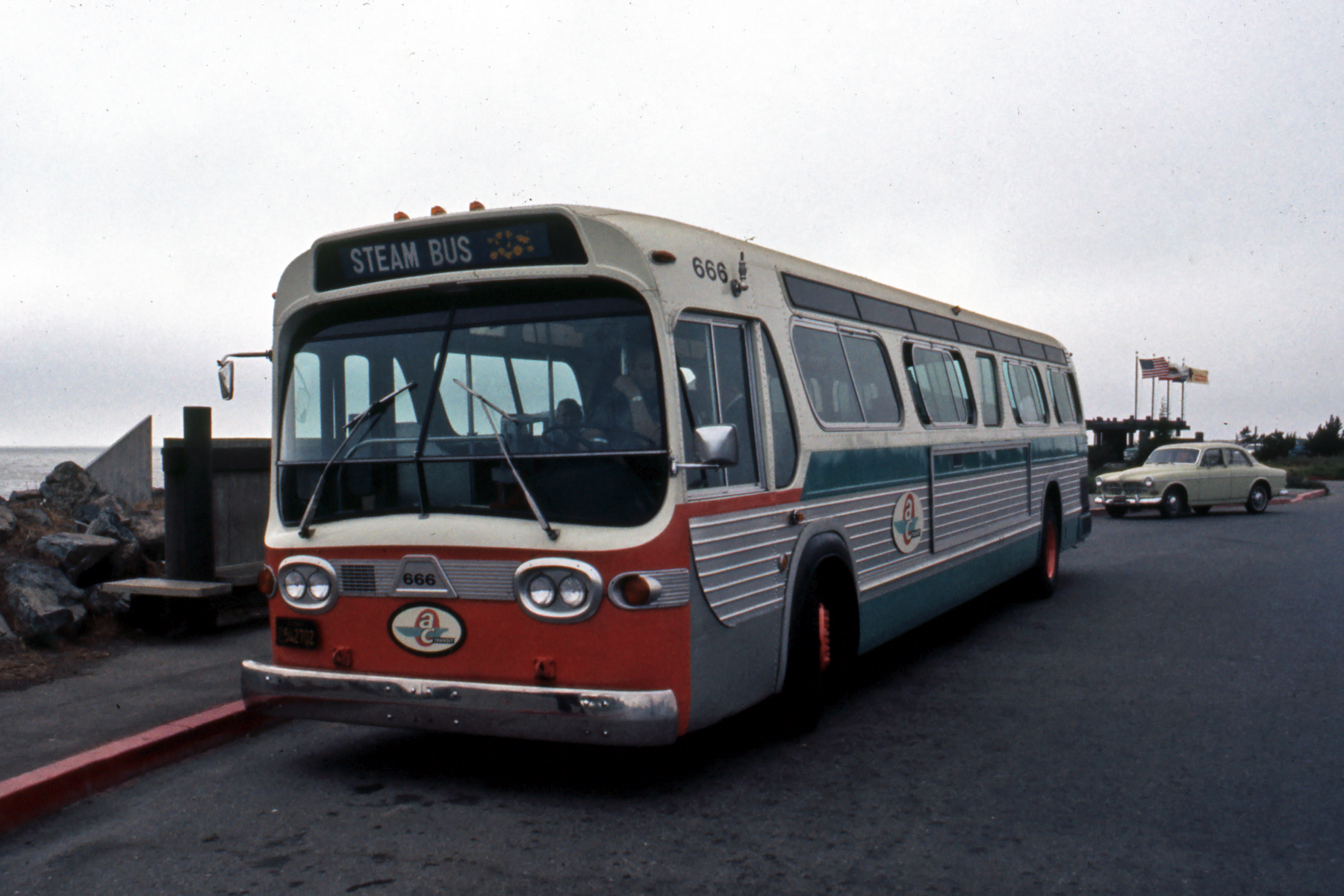
AC Transit GM New Look bus #666, converted to steam power in the early 1970s

In 1969, AC Transit received a grant and converted bus #666 to steam power, which ran in revenue service between 1971 and 1972. The propulsion system was designed by William Brobeck and used a triple-expansion reciprocating steam engine; power was improved compared to the original six-cylinder Detroit Diesel 6V71 engine and emissions were reduced, but fuel consumption was higher than the conventional diesel bus. The steam system is a closed loop. Exhaust steam is condensed and returned to the steam generator, which is an externally-fired boiler that uses 1,400 feet (430 m) of coiled steel tubing. Prior to entering service, the steam bus was exhibited in Washington DC and to the public. Bus #666 completed 3,403 miles (5,477 km) in revenue service when the trial ended in September 1972, and the diesel engine was subsequently reinstalled in the bus.

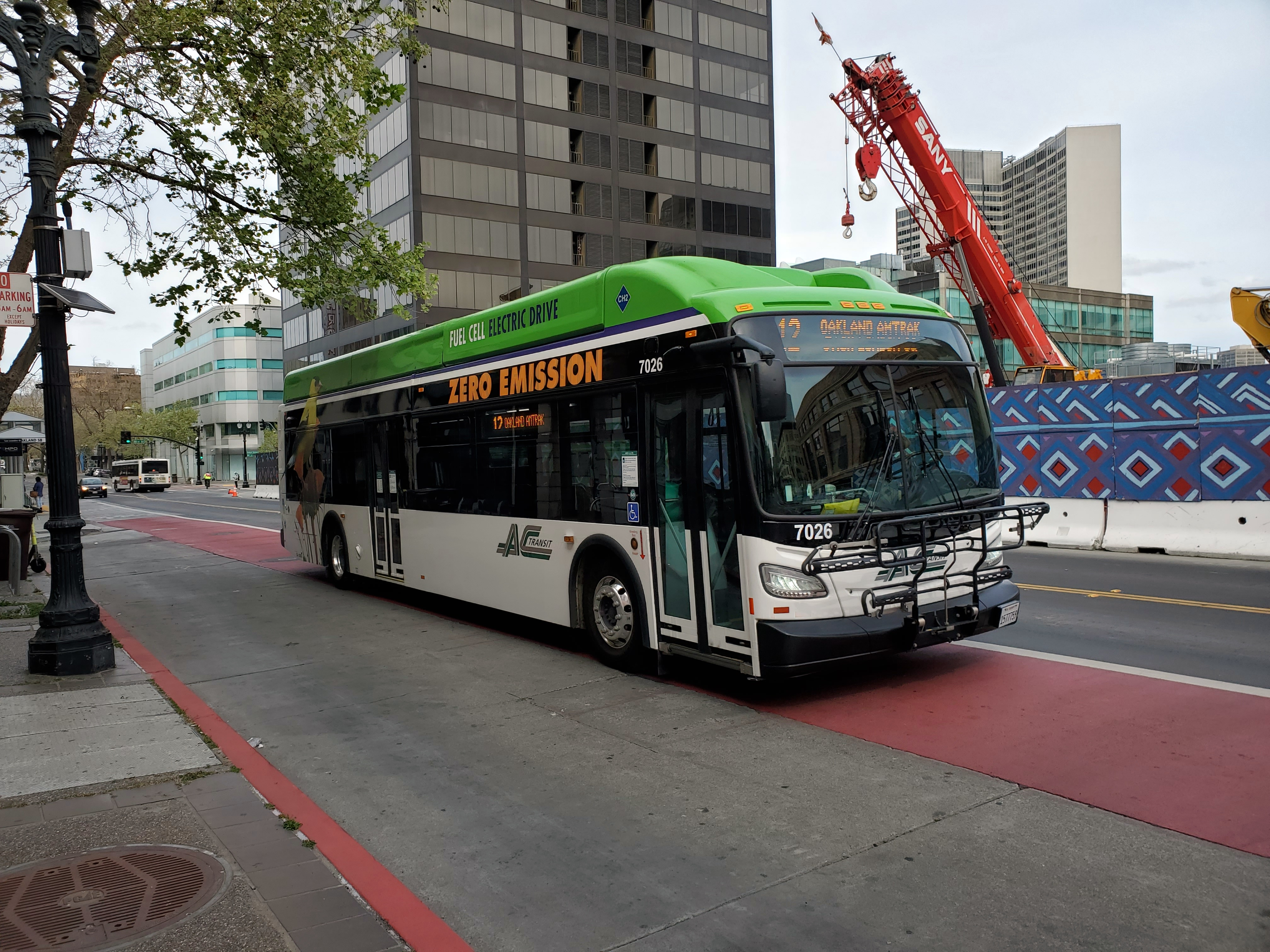
AC Transit bus #9076, a New Flyer XHE40 powered by a hydrogen fuel cell

AC Transit is the lead agency of Zero Emission Bay Area (ZEBA), a consortium of five Bay Area transit agencies (AC Transit, Golden Gate Transit, SFMTA, SamTrans, and VTA) demonstrating fuel cell buses. The District began the HyRoad program in 1999 and tested several fuel cell buses with new hydrogen fuelling infrastructure, including the Ballard/XCELLSiS ZEbus (a New Flyer F40LF with a Ballard fuel cell) in November 1999. Three hydrogen-powered buses, based on the Van Hool A330, operated in revenue service from 2006 to 2010. AC Transit took delivery of 12 additional third-generation fuel cell buses, based on the Van Hool A300L in 2011. In 2019, AC Transit began operating 11 additional hydrogen fuel cell buses from New Flyer, one of which is a 60-foot articulated bus, and 5 battery electric buses from New Flyer.

== Governance ==
AC Transit is governed by a seven-member board of directors. The AC Transit service area is divided into seven wards, each of which elects a board member to a four-year term. As a special district, AC Transit is legally independent of its two namesake county governments. The board of directors hires a professional general manager to operate the agency.

Until 2023, the AC Transit service area was divided into five wards, each of which elected a board member; the remaining two members were elected at-large. Planning began in 2023 to reapportion the AC Transit service area into seven wards, eliminating the at-large seats. The change will be fully implemented in 2026.

=== General Manager and other Board-Appointed Officers ===
The Board of Directors appoints the General Manager, District Secretary, and General Counsel. Past General Managers include James O'Sullivan, Sharon Banks, Rick Fernandez, and Michael Hursh. Kathleen Kelly has served as Acting or Interim General Manager several times.

=== Funding ===
AC Transit is funded by passenger fares and federal, state, and local government subsidies.

In March 2004, voters throughout the San Francisco Bay Area approved Regional Measure 2, which funds regional transportation capital and operating programs through a $1.00 surcharge on the 7 State-owned bridges operated by the Bay Area Toll Authority. In 2023, AC Transit received approximately $11 million in RM2 funds.

In November 2004, voters approved Measure BB, which increased the parcel tax from $24 to $48 annually for 10 years beginning 1 July 2005, to help fund AC Transit services.

In April 2005, a federal class-action lawsuit was filed against the Metropolitan Transportation Commission alleging that it discriminates against AC Transit's primarily minority riders by giving AC Transit disproportionately less money than BART and Caltrain. AC Transit is not party to the lawsuit, and the court sided with MTC in 2009.

In November 2008, voters approved Measure VV, which increased the parcel tax by $48 annually for 10 years beginning 1 July 2009, to help fund AC Transit services. Measure VV also extended the $48 parcel tax approved under Measure BB, so a total $96 annual tax is effective through 30 June 2019.
