= International Boulevard (Oakland, California) =

Road in Oakland

- Interactive map of International Boulevard
- Component highways: SR 185 from Durant Ave to 42nd Ave
- South end: SR 185 E. 14th Street at Durant Avenue
- Major junctions: SR 185 (42nd Avenue)
- North end: First Avenue

International Boulevard (in Oakland), East 14th Street (in San Leandro), and Mission Boulevard (in Hayward, Union City, and Fremont) is a major road in Alameda County, California, United States. The section now known as International Boulevard was also named East 14th Street until 1996, owing to its position in the East Oakland grid plan; though fully deprecated within the city of Oakland today, this name is still commonly used, especially in casual speech. In the city of San Leandro, East 14th Street remains the official name to this day. Mission Boulevard is so named because 43300 is the location of Mission San José. The road was originally called Haywards Road.

South of 42nd Avenue and the end of California State Route 77 (CA-77, SR 77, or "Highway 77"), the street is signed as CA-185; after the junction with CA-92 (which carries the San Mateo Bridge) in Hayward, it is signed as part of CA-238; between I-680 and I-880, it is signed as the relatively obscure CA-262. The Oakland portion features median strip boarding platforms to accommodate the AC Transit Tempo bus rapid transit line.

International Boulevard, East 14th Street, and Mission Boulevard are each among the longest continuously-named streets in the Bay Area individually. The numbers along the International Boulevard are notable in that they are continuous, growing with no large gaps from 102 International Boulevard (at 1st Avenue, one block from Lake Merritt), to 10970 International Boulevard (at the intersection with Durant Avenue on the Oakland/San Leandro border).

In 1996, the city of Oakland renamed its portion of East 14th Street as International Boulevard to acknowledge the cultural diversity of the route, and to address the stigma of the segment being seen as a high-crime area. Fruitvale, a neighborhood of Oakland with a large Hispanic population, is centered on International Boulevard's intersections with Fruitvale and 35th Avenues, and has seen considerable economic growth in recent years. Immediately northwest of Fruitvale are many businesses long owned locally by East and Southeast Asian residents. Much of the rest of International Boulevard is made up of predominantly low-income African-American communities.

Some portions of International Boulevard have gained a reputation as areas of prostitution, and are part of Oakland's continuing troubles with underage prostitution. An award-winning short film about underage prostitution, International Boulevard: A Documentary, covers the issue of Commercially Sexually Exploited Children (CSEC) in Oakland, and on a national level.

== Traffic safety ==
International Boulevard is considered a very dangerous road locally, with a reputation for speeding and recklessness, including cars illegally speeding in bus lanes. According to the Alameda County government, Caltrans, and the Oakland Department of Transportation, speeding is a significant problem on the road. A 2002 study found that International Boulevard had the most pedestrian collisions (both in total and per mile) of any street in Oakland. A 2021 analysis of collision data found that the intersection of 35th Avenue and International Boulevard is the most dangerous intersection in Oakland.

== Transportation ==
AC Transit 1T runs on the boulevard north of Davis Street, running in the median with center boarding islands between Durant Avenue and 20th Avenue.

Trolley service was installed on 14th Street in 1892 by the Oakland, San Leandro and Haywards Electric Railway. The line was absorbed into the sprawling Key System, but streetcar service to Hayward ended in 1935.
