= California Bell Company =

American bell manufacturer

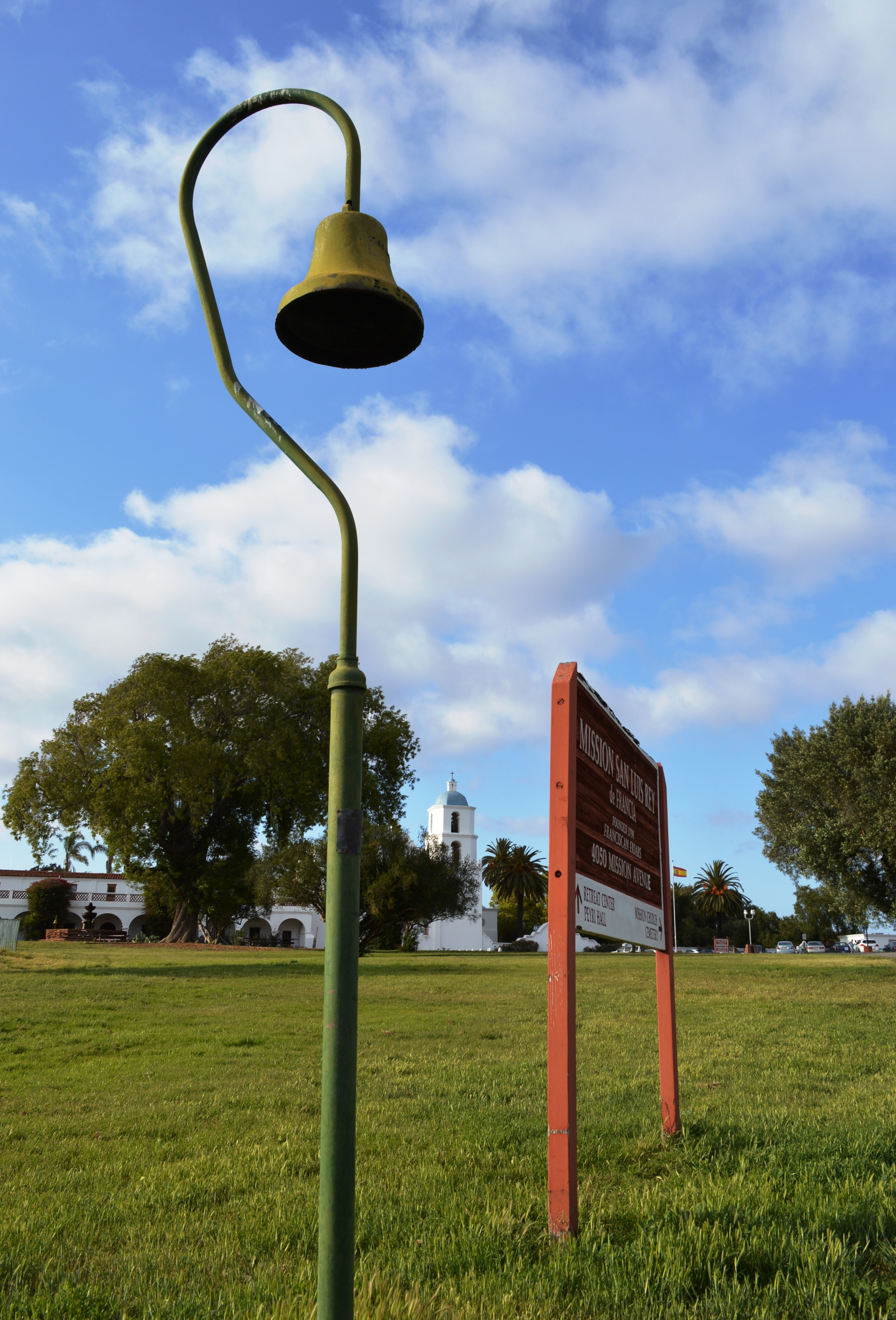
- El Camino Real Bell
- Founded: January 1, 1914; 112 years ago
- Founder: Mrs. A.S.C. Forbes
- Headquarters: Saratoga, California, U.S.
- Area served: California
- Website: www.californiabell.com

The California Bell Company, a company that produces bells, was established in 1914 by Mrs. A.S.C. Forbes. The company has its headquarters in Saratoga, California. Their history goes back to 1906, when Forbes designed the first of the El Camino Real Bells.

== Background ==
The California Bell Company was the first to make the original 1906 El Camino Real Bell. They also manufacture other Mission Style Bells which will complement any Spanish style home. California Bell also makes church bells for customers as far away as Kenya and Tonga but most reside in the US or Canada.

California Bell was established in 1906 and closed in 1960. In 2000, a customer wanted to buy a bell to place in his backyard from the owner of California Bell. The owner would not sell him the bell unless he purchased the whole company. John Kolstad bought the company and reopened California Bell Company's doors in 2000. The company has now made over 1500 bells for customers such as Caltrans, cities, counties, and just for individuals who want them as a decoration.

== Gallery ==
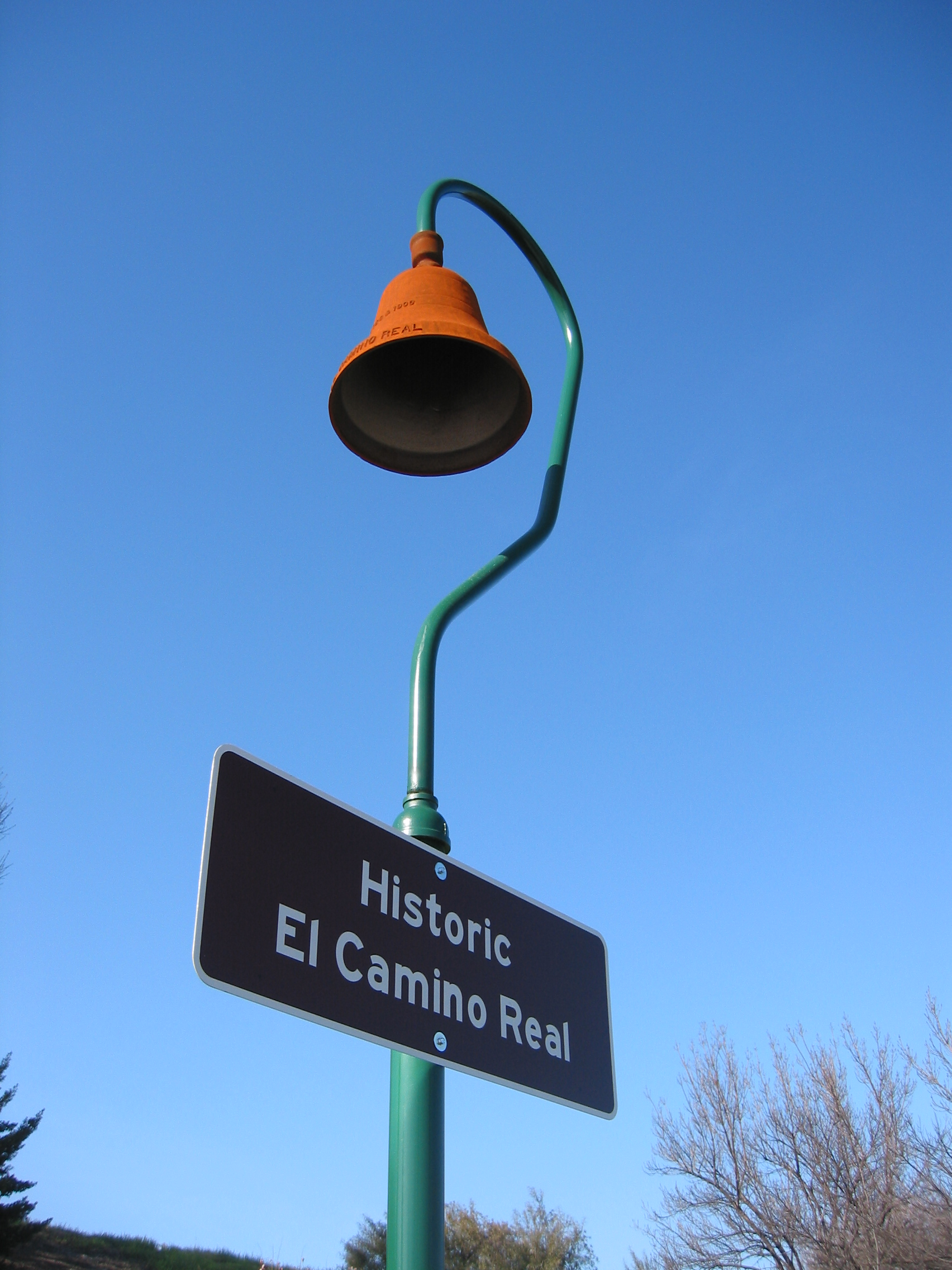
A historical marker along El Camino Real.

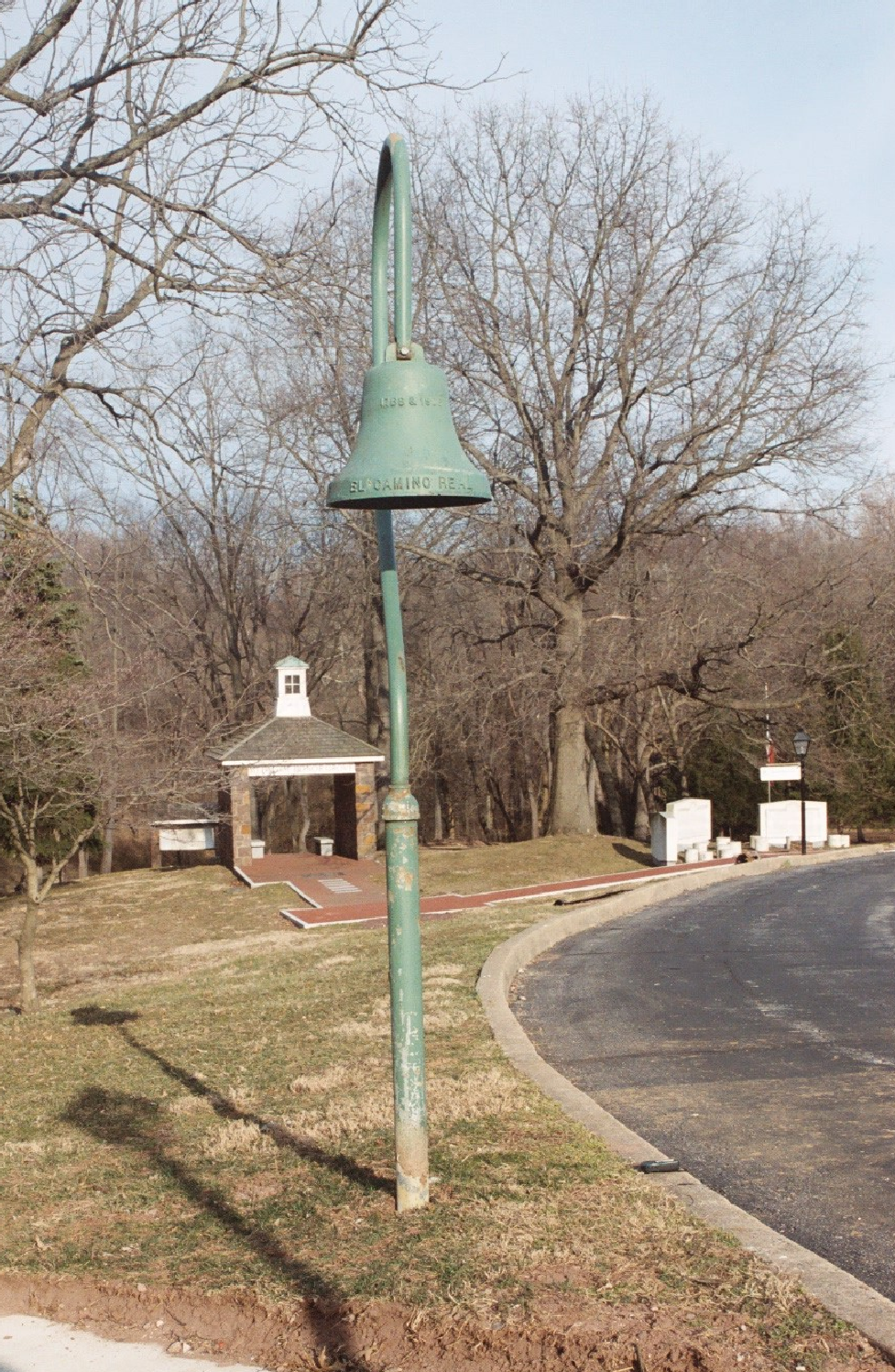
California Section of the Medal of Honor Grove at the Freedoms Foundation

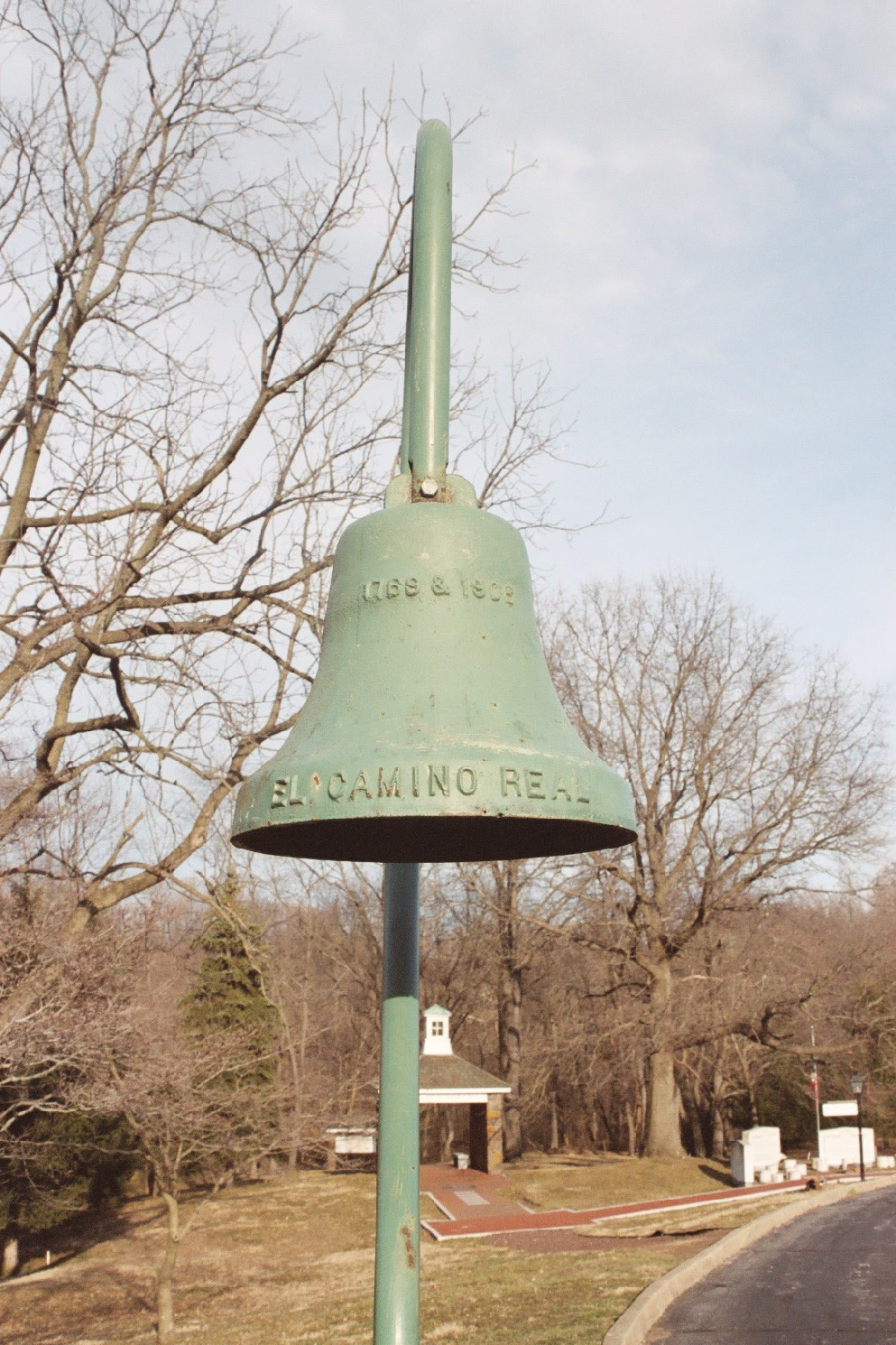
California Section of the Medal of Honor Grove at the Freedoms Foundation
