= Harrye Forbes =

American historical preservationist (1861–1951)

Harrye R. P. Forbes
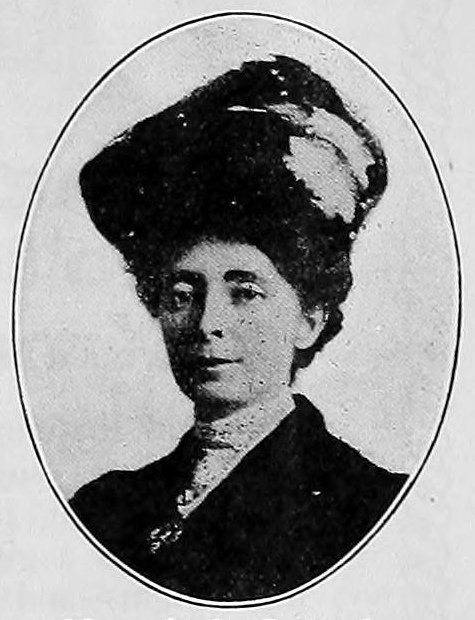
- Born: Harrye Rebecca Piper Smith; May 6, 1861; Everett, Pennsylvania
- Died: September 18, 1951 (aged 90)
- Occupations: historical preservationist, journalist, and author

Harrye Rebecca Piper Forbes (nee Smith; May 6, 1861 – September 18, 1951), also known as Mrs. A. S. C. Forbes, was an American historical preservationist, journalist, and author, best known for her efforts to preserve and promote California's El Camino Real and the old Spanish missions which it connected. She was for many years director of the Historical Society of Southern California.

== Early life ==
Harrye Rebecca Piper Smith was born near Everett, Pennsylvania, one of at least nine children of William Piper Smith (1827–1900) and Rachel Lavinia (Kay) Smith (1831–1921). The family moved to the area of Wichita, Kansas, in the 1870s. She graduated from the Wichita Episcopal College and attended the Heatherley School of Fine Art in London. In 1886 she married English-American businessman Armitage S. C. Forbes (1857–1928) in Wichita. After marriage, the couple moved to Tacoma, Washington, where her husband became owner of Pacific Soda Works. They later relocated to London, where they lived for four years, traveling in France and Spain and collecting art and artifacts. While in Europe she wrote letters to American newspapers. Upon returning to the United States the Forbeses took up residence in Southern California.

== Career ==
Forbes was a writer on topics such as the history of California, Native Americans, and the Boxer Rebellion in China. She sometimes used the pseudonym "Harry Forbes".

Around 1900 Forbes started promoting the idea of a "National Naval Memorial" for dead navy sailors, consisting of a ceremony of casting flowers into the sea. Her ideas were incorporated into naval memorial ceremonies nationwide.

In the early 1900s Forbes was living in Pasadena, California and, along with Tessa Kelso and Anna Pitcher, became involved with saving the deteriorating Spanish missions. In 1904 the El Camino Real Association of California was founded, and Forbes' design for a bell to mark the route of El Camino Real was adopted. In 1906 she established the California Bell Company to make the 90 pound bells, which proved popular and stimulated public interest in preserving the missions. She served for three years as president of the Department of California History and Landmarks for the Federated Clubs of California. Known as an "enthusiastic amateur photographer", she was also on the board of directors of the Los Angeles Camera Club, chair of club's 1902 Los Angeles Salon, and won first place in the Landscape category, the only amateur so awarded.

== Published works ==
- Forbes, Harrye (Mrs. A.S.C. Forbes) (1903). California Missions and Landmarks, El Camino Real (1 ed.). Los Angeles, Ca. ISBN 0343989867.
- Forbes, Harrye (Mrs. A.S.C. Forbes) (1909). Mission Tales in the Days of the Dons. Illustrated by Langdon Smith (1 ed.). Los Angeles, Ca: Kessinger Publishing. ISBN 0548656819.
- Los Pastorcillos En Belen [Little Shepherds of Bethlehem]. Translated by Harrye Forbes (Mrs. A.S.C. Forbes). Los Angeles: Wetzel Publishing Company. 1929.
