= East 14th Street Historic District =

Historic district in Iowa, United States

- U.S. National Register of Historic Places
- U.S. Historic district
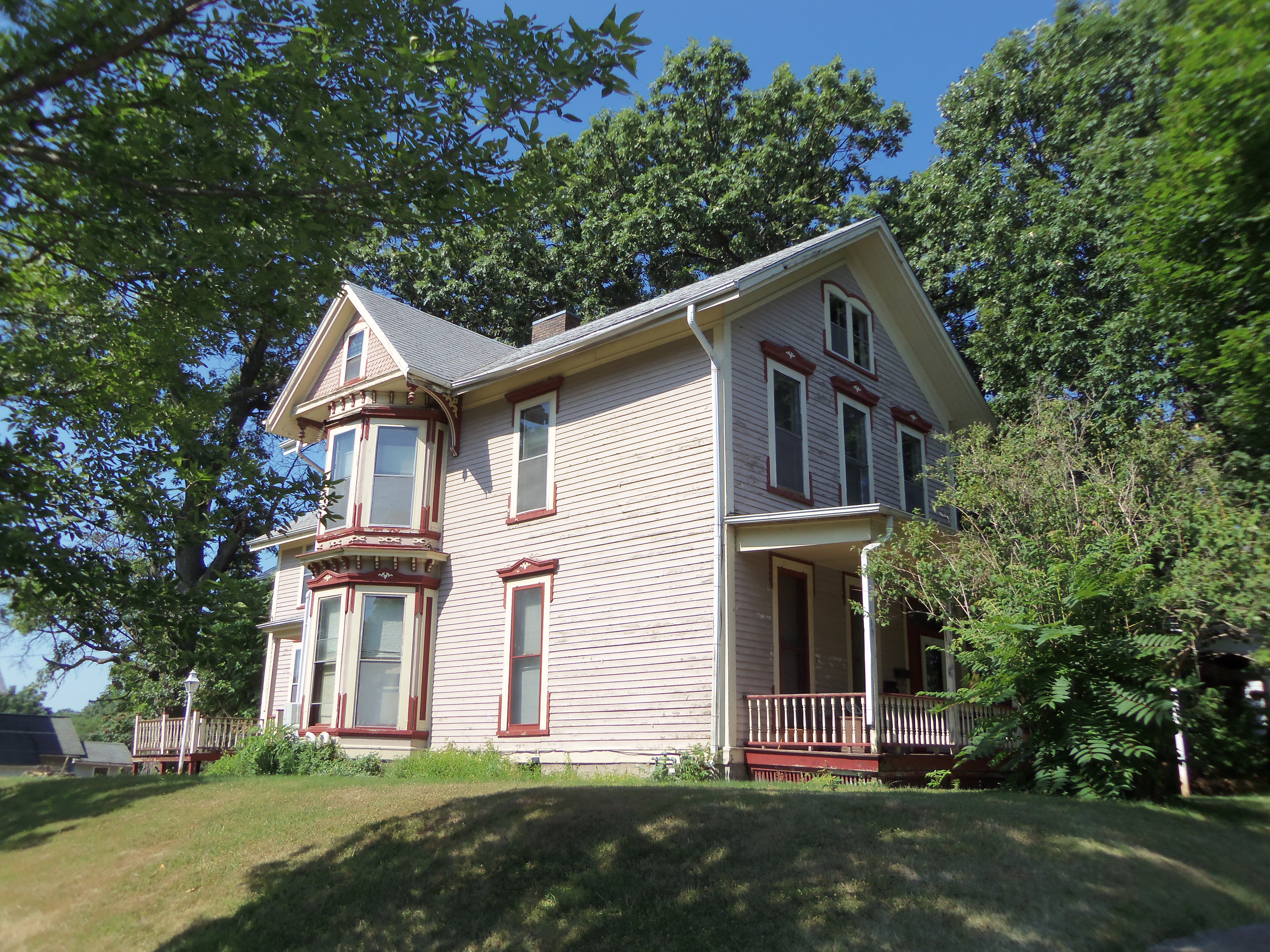

- Location within Iowa Location within the United States
- Location: 14th Street from Pershing to Arlington Ave., Davenport, Iowa
- Coordinates: 41°32′2″N 90°34′1″W
- Architectural style: Late Victorian
- MPS: Davenport MRA
- NRHP reference No.: 83003649
- Added to NRHP: November 18, 1983

The East 14th Street Historic District is a neighborhood located on the east side of Davenport, Iowa, United States. It has been listed on the National Register of Historic Places since 1983.

== History ==
The historic district is located in a part of the city known as the LeClaire Reserve and was developed later than other parts of the Reserve. It covers the 300 to the 800 blocks of East 14th Street and includes 67 houses. The earliest homes were built in the 1870s and the newest around 1910, however, most of the houses were built between 1880 and 1900. The district is located in the heart of the non-German residential area. The Germans largely resided to the west of Harrison Street. Several prominent entrepreneurs, industrialists, and professionals lived along East 14th Street. Their families, however, lived here for several decades unlike the German's who would spend a lifetime in their neighborhoods.

== Architecture ==
The homes on East 14th Street are described as “solid, reasonably prosperous, and unostentatious.” For the most part, they are large (2 to 2½ stories) and of frame construction. The houses are located on long, narrow lots and are set back 20–30 feet from the street. Many of the lots are slightly elevated and terraced. Most of the houses are single-family dwellings, or they were when they were built. There are also several double houses where the two sides of the main facade are a mirror image of each other.

The houses follow changing tastes and architectural styles. The earliest style found in the district is the Italianate with its emphasis on symmetry and the horizontal. It was followed by the Queen Anne with its irregular plan, towers, variegated roofs, projecting bays, dormers, and a variety of surface textures. Closer to the turn of the 20th century the symmetry of the Colonial Revival style became more predominant, especially the Georgian Revival form. Some of the houses show the influence of the Prairie Style. There is also evidence that older homes were remodeled with the features and textures of the later styles, so some of the houses are a combination of styles. East 14th Street also has several houses built in a vernacular style that was popular in 19th century Davenport. They are two-story, three-bay, front gable houses with a main entrance that is off center and a window located in the gable end.
