= Interstate 238 and California State Route 238 =

State highway in California

Interstate 238 and State Route 238
- I-238 highlighted in red; SR 238 in purple; the gap represents the relinquished portion

Route information
- Maintained by Caltrans
- Length: 11.20 mi (18.02 km) Portions of SR 238 have been relinquished to or are otherwise maintained by local or other governments, and are not included in the length.
- History: Designated 1934 (as SR 9); July 1, 1964 renumbered SR 238; Northernmost portion designated I-238 in May 1983 by FHWA
- Component highways: SR 238 from Fremont to Castro Valley; I-238 from Castro Valley to San Leandro

Major junctions
- South end: I-680 in Fremont
- SR 84 in Fremont; SR 92 / SR 185 in Hayward; I-580 in Castro Valley
- North end: I-880 in San Leandro

Location
- Country: United States
- State: California
- Counties: Alameda

Highway system
- Interstate Highway System; Main; Auxiliary; Suffixed; Business; Future; State highways in California; Interstate; US; State; Scenic; History; Pre‑1964; Unconstructed; Deleted; Freeways
| ← SR 237 | → SR 241 |

Route 238, consisting of State Route 238 (SR 238) and Interstate 238 (I-238), is a mostly north–south state and auxiliary Interstate highway in the San Francisco Bay Area of California. The southern segment is signed as SR 238 and is a divided multilane surface highway that runs parallel to the Hayward hills between I-680 in Fremont and I-580 in Castro Valley. The northern segment is signed as I-238 and is a six-lane freeway that runs more east–west between I-580 and I-880 in San Leandro.

The numbering of I-238 does not fit within the usual conventions of existing three-digit auxiliary Interstate Highways, where a single digit is prefixed to the two-digit number of its parent Interstate Highway as I-38 does not exist. The I-238 number was specifically requested by the state of California so it could match the California Streets and Highways Code and because all three-digit combinations of I-80 (the primary two-digit Interstate in the Bay Area) were already being used in the state.

Though some maps and signs mark SR 238 as continuous through Hayward, control of most of the route within the city was relinquished to that local jurisdiction and is thus no longer officially part of the state highway system.

== Route description ==
Route 238 is defined in section 538, subdivision (a), of the California Streets and Highways Code, and that the highway is "from Route 680 in Fremont to Route 61 near San Lorenzo via Hayward." Route 238 was never fully constructed to extend to near San Lorenzo as it is defined, as was SR 61's proposed southern extension from that highway's current southern terminus in San Leandro. Also, control of former portions of Route 238 have been relinquished by the state to the city of Hayward. However, section 538 subdivision (b) further mandates that the city must still "maintain within their respective jurisdictions signs directing motorists to the continuation of Route 238". In addition, subdivision (c) permits the state to relinquish the remaining conventional highway portion of Route 238 located in Hayward to the city.

Only the constructed segment of Route 238 from I-580 in Castro Valley to I-880 in San Leandro is considered an Interstate Highway according to the Federal Highway Administration (FHWA)'s route logs.

Route 238 is part of the California Freeway and Expressway System and is part of the National Highway System, a network of highways that are considered essential to the country's economy, defense, and mobility by the Federal Highway Administration (FHWA).

=== SR 238 ===
SR 238 runs from I-680 in Fremont to Union City, Hayward and I-580 in Castro Valley parallel to the Hayward hills. Until I-680 was completed in the area and supplanted it completely as a through route, SR 238 extended south to San Jose at its intersection with US Route 101 (US 101). Locally, it is designated Mission Boulevard from I-680 to the intersection with SR 92 and SR 185 (which continues as Mission Boulevard) in Hayward. It is designated as Foothill Boulevard in northern Hayward from A Street to I-580.

In Downtown Hayward immediately north of SR 92, northbound traffic continues along the original SR 238 alignment on Foothill Boulevard, while southbound traffic is diverted onto A Street and Mission Boulevard. This loop of one-way streets is known as the "Hayward Loop".

==== Mission Boulevard ====
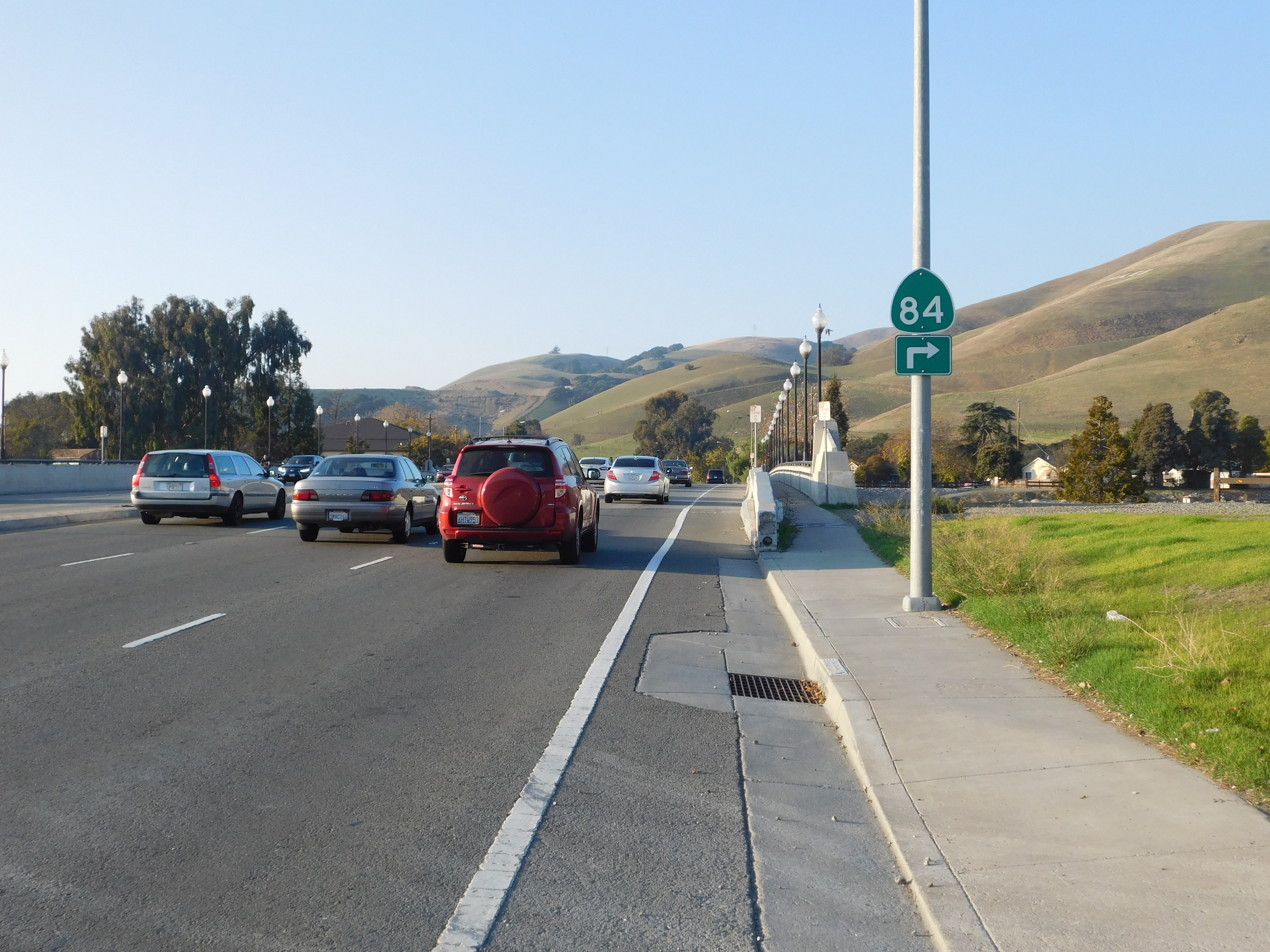
SR 238 approaching SR 84 (Niles Canyon Road) in Fremont

Mission Boulevard, the former El Camino Viejo and El Camino Real, is the road that passes in front of Mission San José, the historic Spanish Mission founded in 1797, for which the road is named. Mission Boulevard proceeds in both directions from the Mission, but mainly northwest (the former El Camino Viejo) through Fremont, Union City, and Hayward. At the north end of Hayward, it changes its name to East 14th Street, which continues as a major thoroughfare going through San Leandro and Oakland. Since it runs along the base of the hills, Mission Boulevard nearly coincides with the Hayward Fault, a major earthquake fault, for almost the entire length of the Boulevard. The southern direction from the Mission San José is the former El Camino Real route to Mission Santa Clara de Asís.

Mission Boulevard joins the historic centers of the Mission San Jose and Niles districts of Fremont (formerly independent towns), the Decoto district of Union City (formerly an independent town), and Hayward.

=== I-238 ===
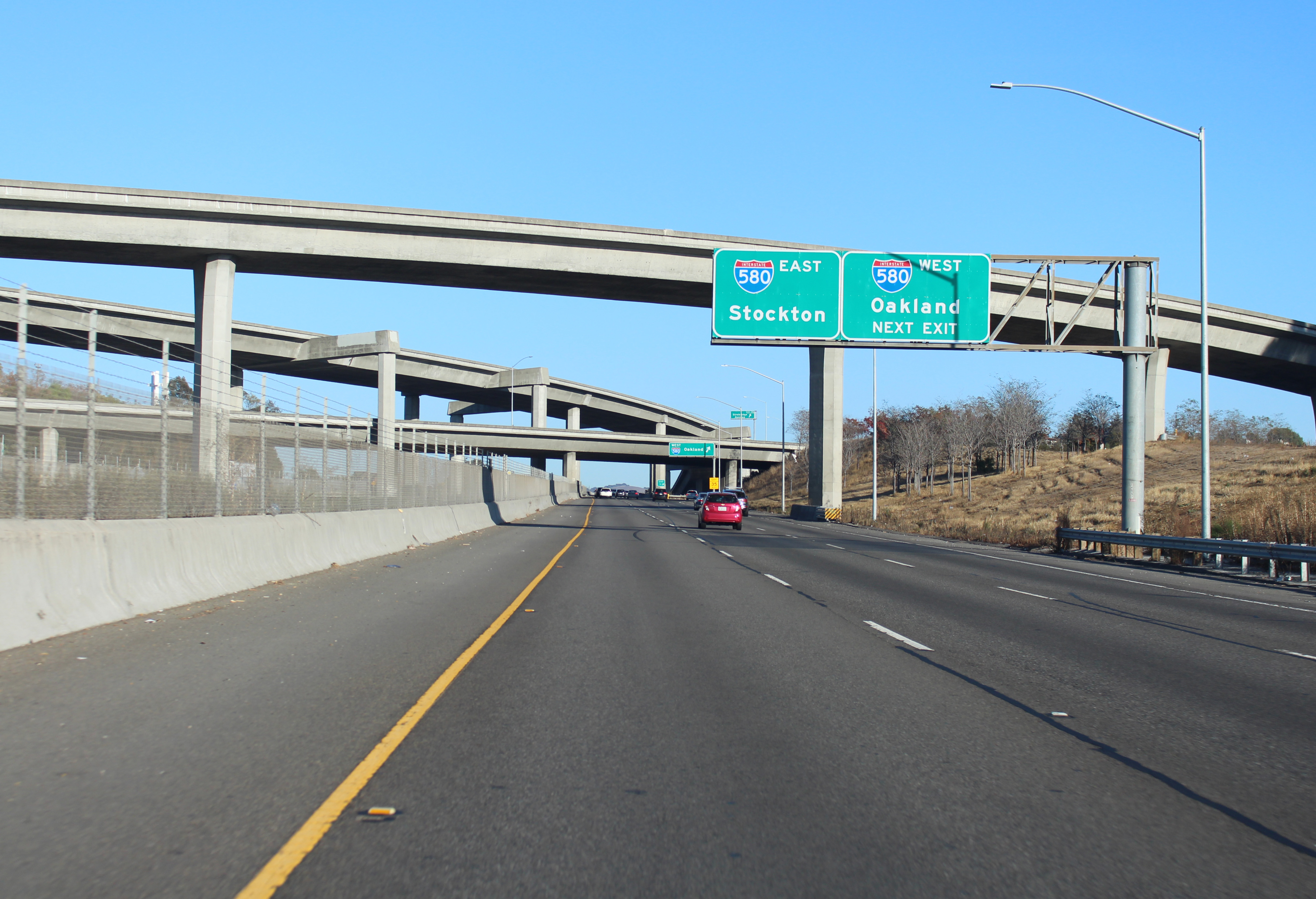
Eastern end of Interstate 238 at the interchange with Interstate 580 in Ashland

Although the 2.23-mile-long (3.59 km) I-238 goes in an east–west direction from Castro Valley to San Leandro, the California Department of Transportation (Caltrans) officially signs it as a north–south freeway since the rest of SR 238 is more north–south. The southern (geographically eastern) terminus of I-238 is at its interchange with I-580 and SR 238 in Castro Valley. From there, it enters into the southern portion of the census-designated place of Ashland, running parallel to its border with Cherryland. Then, after entering San Leandro, I-238 ends at its northern (geographically western) terminus with I-880.

I-238 and I-880 are used as an alternate truck route between Castro Valley and Oakland; trucks over 4.5 short tons (4.1 t; 4.0 long tons) are prohibited through the latter on I-580.

==== I-238 numbering ====
I-238 does not follow established rules for numbering Interstates as there is no I-38. As it connects two auxiliary routes of I-80, it would normally use a three-digit number ending in 80, but, of the nine possible numbers, two (180 and 480) were in use by State Routes (the latter an Interstate until 1968 though SR 480 was deleted in 1991), and the remainder were already in use by other California auxiliary routes. (I-880 was designated at the same time as I-238.) I-238 is treated as an auxiliary route of I-80 instead.

== History ==
=== State Route 9 ===
State Route 9
- Location: Fremont–Santa Cruz
- Existed: 1934–1963 north of SR 17

Before California massively renumbered its state highways in 1964, SR 238 was part of SR 9, which extended south to San Jose and Santa Cruz.

=== Canceled Foothill/Mission Freeway project ===
For several decades, SR 238 from I-680 in Fremont to Hayward was planned to be upgraded to a freeway, called the "Mission" or "Foothill" freeway. The segment was submitted to the Interstate Highway System in October 1968 but was rejected. Then, after years of various lawsuits and appeals, Caltrans decided to cancel the project in 2003 and sell off the property it had acquired in the name of eminent domain along the proposed route.

As an alternative, SR 238 was proposed to be expanded from two lanes in each direction to three lanes in each direction along the majority of its width. Various other improvements began in July 2010. The California State Legislature then relinquished control of the segment of SR 238 within Hayward between Industrial Parkway and the Castro Valley border/Apple Avenue to local control in 2012. In March 2013, the routing in Downtown Hayward was changed to include a one way circulation known as the "Hayward Loop", designed to improve traffic flow between SR 238, SR 185, and SR 92.

=== I-238 segment ===
The section of road that is now I-238 had no signed number before the 1964 renumbering; it was pre-1964 Legislative Route 228 (along with an unbuilt extension west to unbuilt SR 61, which is still included in the SR 238 definition). The segment was then built as a freeway in 1956.

When I-880 was added to the Interstate Highway System as a renumbering of part of SR 17, the short piece of SR 238 connecting I-880 to I-580 was also added; both were non-chargeable routes (not eligible for Interstate Completion funds). Both numbers—I-238 and I-880—were approved by the American Association of State Highway and Transportation Officials (AASHTO) on July 7, 1983. The interchanges with I-580 and I-880 were rebuilt from 1988 to 1994, in part to add missing ramps between I-238 and I-880 toward the south. Prior to the completion of the ramps, access was provided by Hesperian Boulevard.

On July 7, 1983, while approving the designation, AASHTO said:

This is to inform you that your application for the elimination of Route 180 and extension of Route 580, and the establishment of Route 880 and Route 238 have been approved.
However, since the I-238 designation does not fit the overall national numbering sequence and was necessitated only because all three[-digit] combinations of I-80 have been used, the Committee has a further option to offer for your consideration. If the I-580 designation [were] continued from Castro Valley to San Lorenzo and then used in place of the proposed I-880 designation northerly to Oakland and over existing I-180 between Albany and San Rafael, then existing I-580 between Castro Valley and Oakland could be designated I-180. The Committee does recognize this option would involve considerable resigning, however.

On July 27, 1983, Caltrans responded:

We already have a State Route 180 in our Fresno area, and this route is separated from I-580 in Castro Valley by about 100 miles [160 km]. We are therefore unable to recommend the designation of existing I-580 between Castro Valley and Oakland as I-180.

With the decommissioning of SR 480 in 1991, the "480" designation was once again made available. However, there has been no push since then to renumber I-238 to I-480.

In September 2006, a project began to reconstruct the entire length of I-238, including a reconfigured interchange with I-880 and an added travel lane in each direction. Additionally, almost all the bridges and overpasses were replaced with new ones meeting current earthquake resistance standards. The project was completed in October 2009, six months ahead of schedule.

=== Canceled northwestern extension ===
There were plans to extend Route 238 from I-880 to SR 61. SR 61 itself was originally planned to extend south from San Leandro, and across present-day open San Francisco Bay or wetlands, to as far south as the Dumbarton Bridge's east approach. The SR 61/238 interchange would likely have sat atop landfill; as public opinion shifted against filling in the bay, completing the remaining portions of both highways also fell out of favor.

== Major intersections ==
The entire route is in Alameda County.

| Location | mi | km | Exit | Destinations | Notes |
|---|---|---|---|---|---|
| Fremont | 0.00 | 0.00 | | Mission Boulevard | Continuation beyond I-680; former SR 21 south |
| Fremont | 0.00 | 0.00 | | I-680 – San Jose, Sacramento | Interchange; southern end of SR 238; I-680 exit 16 |
| Fremont | 2.76 | 4.44 | | Walnut Avenue, Morrison Canyon Road | Serves Kaiser Permanente Fremont Medical Center, Washington Hospital |
| Fremont | 3.31 | 5.33 | | SR 84 west (Mowry Avenue) – Centerville District, Newark, Dumbarton Bridge | South end of SR 84 overlap |
| Fremont | 3.64 | 5.86 | | SR 84 east (Niles Canyon Road) / Niles Boulevard – Sunol, Livermore, Niles District | North end of SR 84 overlap |
| Union City | 6.78 | 10.91 | | Decoto Road – Decoto District, Dumbarton Bridge | |
| Hayward | 9.32 | 15.00 | | Alquire Parkway, Industrial Parkway to I-880 | Northern end of state maintenance |
| Hayward | 9.94 | 16.00 | | Tennyson Road | |
| Hayward | 11.20 | 18.02 | | Harder Road to SR 92 / I-880 – San Mateo Bridge | |
| Hayward | 12.61 | 20.29 | | SR 92 (Jackson Street) to I-880 – San Mateo Bridge, San Mateo, San Jose | No northbound access; south end of "Hayward Loop" one-way pair where northbound traffic continues on Foothill Boulevard and southbound traffic joins from Mission Boulevard |
| Hayward | 12.61 | 20.29 | | SR 185 north (Mission Boulevard north) / A Street west | Northbound access is via a left turn on A Street; southbound traffic turns left from A Street west onto Mission Boulevard south |
| Hayward | 13.12 | 21.11 | | A Street | North end of "Hayward Loop" one-way pair where southbound traffic is diverted onto A Street west |
| Hayward–Castro Valley line | 14.08 | 22.66 | Southern end of state maintenance | | |
| Castro Valley | 14.10 | 22.69 | | I-580 west (MacArthur Freeway) – Oakland | Interchange; northbound exit and southbound entrance; I-580 exit 34 |
| Castro Valley | 14.10 | 22.69 | | I-580 east (MacArthur Freeway) – Stockton | Interchange; northbound exit only |
| Castro Valley | 14.50 | 23.34 | | Castro Valley Boulevard, Mattox Road | Interchange northbound and at-grade intersection southbound |
| Castro Valley | 14.74 | 23.72 | Northern end of SR 238; southern end of I-238 Freeway | | |
| Castro Valley | 14.74 | 23.72 | 14 | I-580 (MacArthur Freeway) – Oakland, Stockton | Southbound left exit and northbound left entrance; I-580 exit 34 |
| Ashland | 14.98 | 24.11 | 15 | SR 185 (East 14th Street, Mission Boulevard) | Mission Boulevard not signed northbound despite the name change when SR 185 cross I-238 |
| San Leandro | 15.22 | 24.49 | 16A | I-880 south (Nimitz Freeway) – San Jose, San Mateo Bridge | Northbound exit and southbound entrance; former SR 17 south; I-880 north exit 31A |
| San Leandro | 15.46 | 24.88 | 16B | Hesperian Boulevard – San Lorenzo | Northbound exit and southbound entrance |
| San Leandro | 15.70 | 25.27 | 17A | Washington Avenue | Northbound exit and southbound entrance |
| San Leandro | 15.96 | 25.69 | 17B | I-880 north (Nimitz Freeway) – Oakland | Northbound exit and southbound entrance; northern end of I-238; former SR 17 north; I-880 south exit 31 |
1.000 mi = 1.609 km; 1.000 km = 0.621 mi: Concurrency terminus; Incomplete access; Route transition
