= California State Route 185 =

State highway in California

State Route 185 and State Route 77
- SR 185 in red, SR 77 in purple

Route information
- Maintained by Caltrans
- Length: 10.826 mi (17.423 km) Length of SR 77 is 0.353 mi (1 km)
- Existed: 1964 renumbering–present

SR 185
- South end: A Street in Hayward
- Major intersections: I-238 in Ashland
- North end: SR 77 in Oakland

SR 77
- East end: SR 185 in Oakland
- West end: I-880 in Oakland

Location
- Country: United States
- State: California
- Counties: Alameda

Highway system
- State highways in California; Interstate; US; State; Scenic; History; Pre‑1964; Unconstructed; Deleted; Freeways
← SR 184	→ SR 186
← SR 76	→ SR 78

State Route 185 (SR 185) is a state highway in the San Francisco Bay Area of the U.S. state of California. It runs along sections of Mission Boulevard in Hayward, East 14th Street in San Leandro and International Boulevard in Oakland. Though some maps mark SR 185's south end at State Route 92 (Jackson Street) in Hayward, control of the segment south of A Street was relinquished to the city. At the north end of SR 185 at International Boulevard and 42nd Avenue, the short State Route 77 (SR 77) heads southwest to Interstate 880.

== Route description ==
The south end of SR 185 is defined to be at State Route 92 (Jackson Street) in Hayward. However, state control of the segment in Hayward south of A Street was relinquished to the city in 2010, and thus no longer officially part of the state highway system. The City of Hayward has since re-configured the segment of Mission Boulevard from A Street south to SR 92 as part of the one-way pair known as the "Hayward Loop." Traffic in the Hayward Loop travels one-way northbound on Foothill Boulevard, and one-way southbound on A Street and Mission Boulevard.

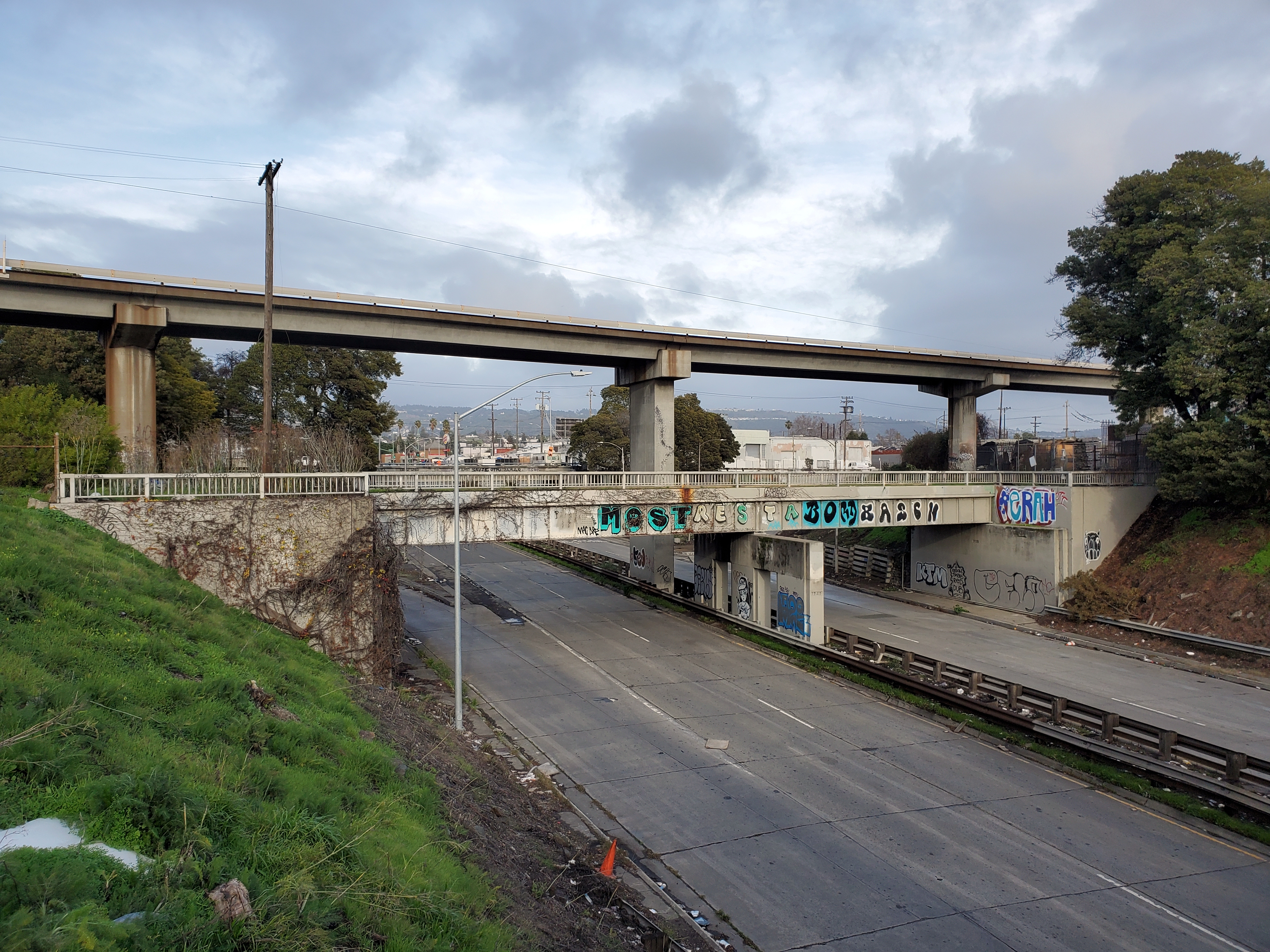
The BART viaduct over SR 77

SR 185 then heads north on Mission Boulevard, then becomes East 14th Street after it crosses under Interstate 238 in the community of Cherryland. SR 185 then meets the east end of State Route 112 (signed as State Route 61) in downtown San Leandro.

SR 185 becomes International Boulevard after crossing the Oakland city limits. The north end of SR 185 then lies just northwest of High Street at 42nd Avenue, where the short State Route 77 heads southwest to Interstate 880. SR 77 was originally signed as SR 185 from SR 185's terminus to I-880; since at least August 2008, Caltrans has erected SR 77 shields in place of SR 185 shields as reassurance markers and freeway entrance signage at SR 77's two on-ramps at International Boulevard/42nd Avenue and East 12 Street. SR 77 was originally a freeway; however, in 2011, the interchange with I-880 was converted to consist of intersections, as part of the I-880 High Street Seismic Retrofit Project, therefore SR 77 can no longer be considered a freeway.

The 0.35-mile (0.56 km) State Route 77 is part of a proposed 13.8 miles (22.2 km) route, which would run from I-880 northeast past SR 185 to Interstate 580 near High Street. There, it would turn northwest on I-580 toward Park Boulevard, splitting there to head northeast and north to State Route 24 near Lafayette.

Only the part east of unbuilt State Route 93 west of Moraga is part of the California Freeway and Expressway System; this does not include the constructed part, which was built as a short freeway. SR 185 is part of the National Highway System, a network of highways that are considered essential to the country's economy, defense, and mobility by the Federal Highway Administration.

== History ==
In 1996, the city of Oakland renamed its portion of East 14th Street as International Boulevard to acknowledge the cultural diversity of the route, and to address the stigma of the segment being seen as a high-crime area.

In 2012, the California legislature relinquished control of SR 185 in Downtown Hayward between SR 92/SR 238 and A Street to local control. In March 2013, this segment became part of a one way circulation known as the "Hayward Loop", designed to improve traffic flow between SR 92, SR 185 and SR 238.

== Major intersections ==
Except where prefixed with a letter, postmiles were measured on the road as it was in 1964, based on the alignment that existed at the time, and do not necessarily reflect current mileage. Postmile prefixes include: R reflecting a realignment in the route since then, M indicating a second realignment, L referring to an overlap due to a correction or change, and T indicating postmiles classified as temporary. Segments that remain unconstructed or have been relinquished to local control may be omitted. The entire route is in Alameda County.

Location	Postmile	Destinations	Notes
Hayward	0.00	SR 92 west (Jackson Street) to I-880 / Mission Boulevard south	South end of SR 185 and "Hayward Loop"; no left turn from SR 185 south; Mission Boulevard south is relinquished SR 238
Hayward	0.38	A Street	South end of state maintenance; north end of "Hayward Loop"; no left turn from SR 185 south; traffic from Foothill Boulevard south joins in from A Street; access to Foothill Boulevard north to I-238 / I-580 is via a left turn at C Street
Ashland	1.99	I-238 south to I-580 / Lewelling Boulevard – Stockton	I-238 exit 15
Ashland	1.99	I-238 north to I-880 / 170th Avenue – Oakland	I-238 exit 15
San Leandro	5.73	Davis Street (SR 61) / Callan Avenue	
Oakland	7.24	98th Avenue	
Oakland	8.69	Hegenberger Road, 73rd Avenue	
Oakland	10.47 0.45 (Note: Indicates that the postmile represents the distance along SR 77 rather than SR 185.)	42nd Avenue, International Boulevard	North end of SR 185; east end of SR 77
Oakland	0.37	East 12th Street, High Street	Interchange; southbound exit and northbound entrance
Oakland	0.10	I-880 (Nimitz Freeway) – San Jose, Downtown Oakland, Alameda	Interchange; west end of SR 77; I-880 exit 38; former SR 17
1.000 mi = 1.609 km; 1.000 km = 0.621 mi: Incomplete access; Route transition
