= Belmont Slough =

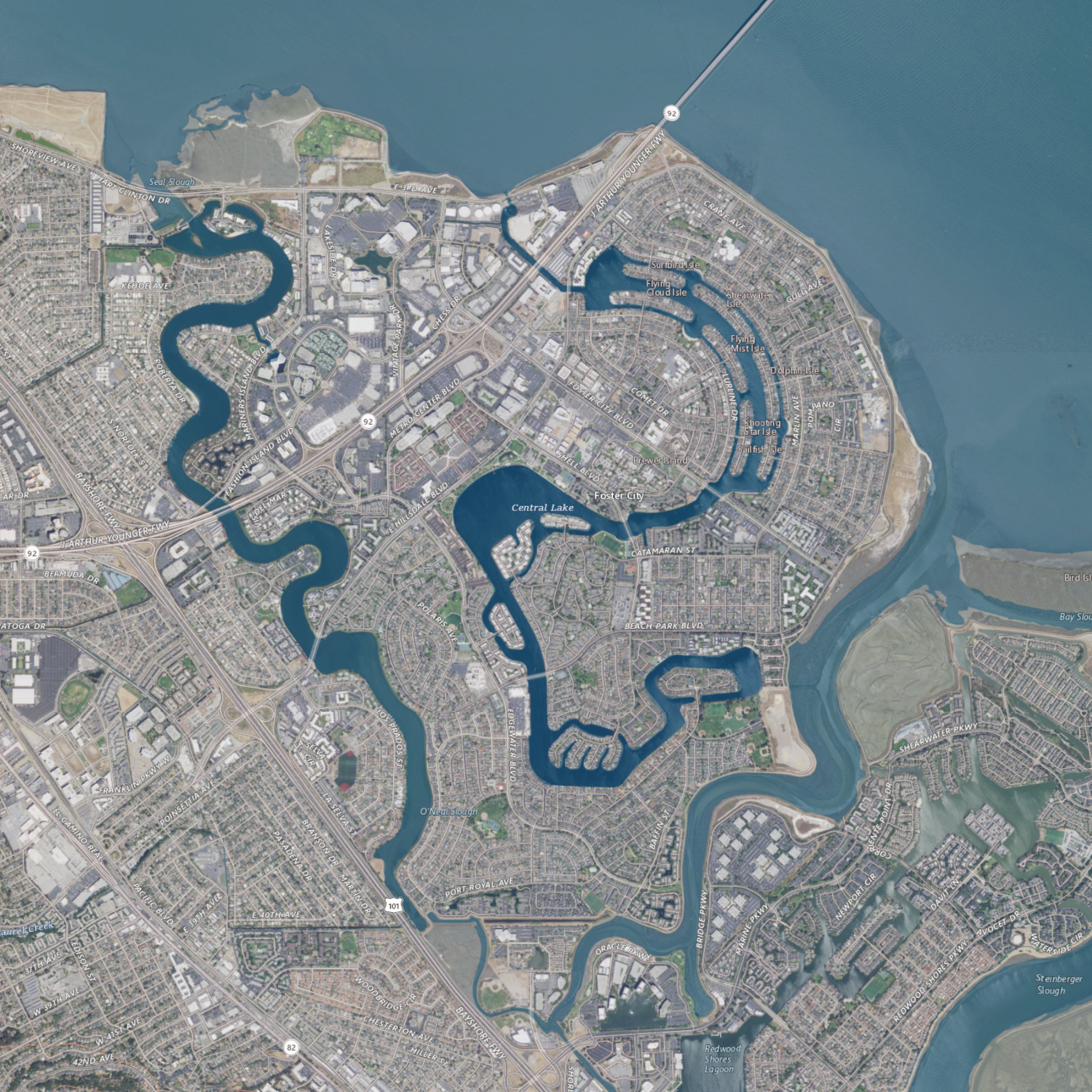
- Satellite view of Foster City / Brewer Island, which is separated from the mainland by Seal Slough (to the west) and Belmont Slough (to the east/south). The Redwood Shores peninsula is just visible in the southeast corner, with Steinberger Slough separating it from Bair Island.

- Location within San Francisco Bay Area Location within California

Location
- Country: United States
- State: California

Physical characteristics
- Source
  - coordinates: 37°33′15″N 122°14′40″W

Belmont Slough is a slough on the western shore of San Francisco Bay separating Redwood Shores and Foster City. It provides estuarine and marine deepwater habitats in its subtidal waters, which are characterized as brackish and saltwater.

== Course ==
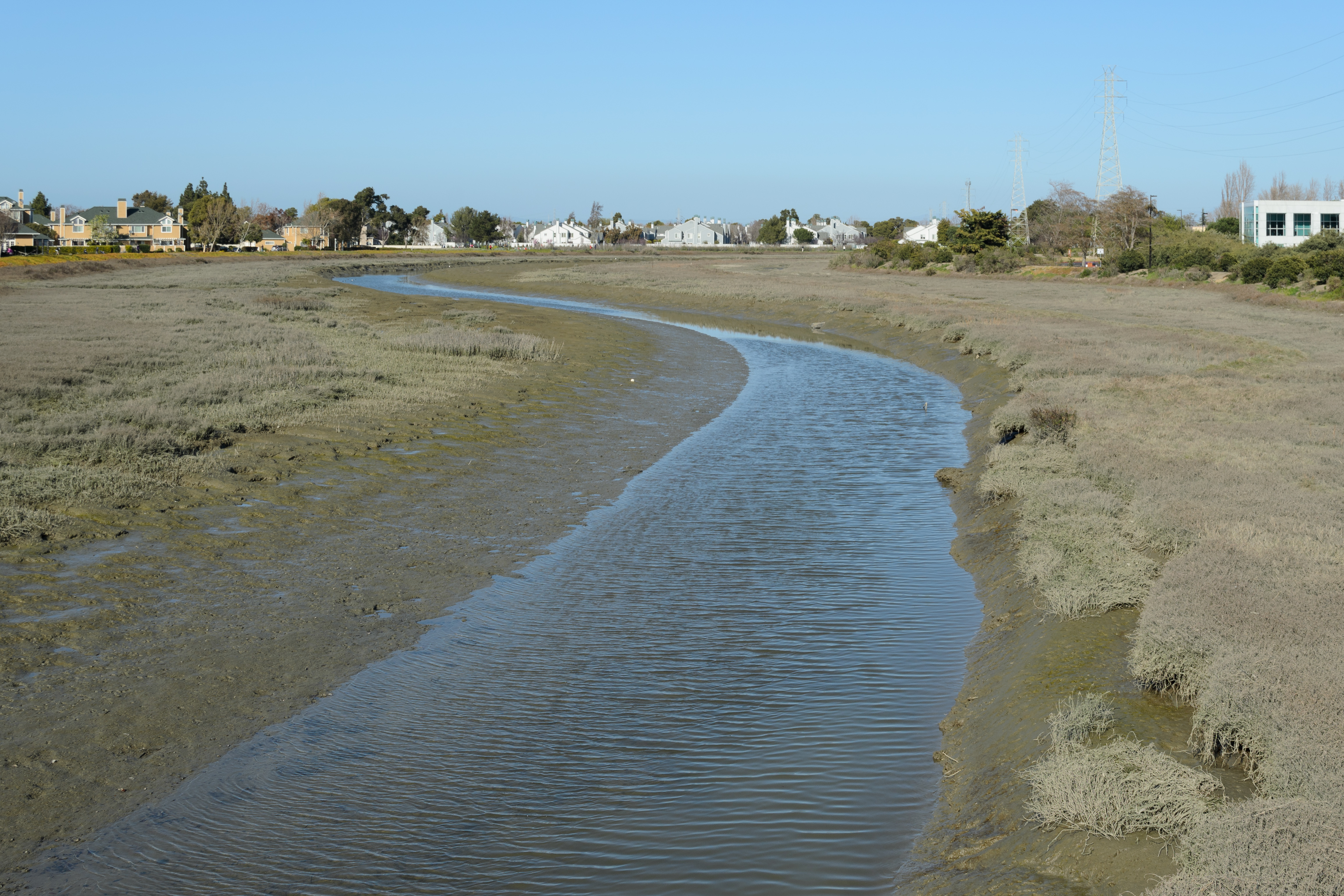
Near the head of Belmont Slough, as seen from Oracle Bridge in 2013, Redwood Shores, Redwood City, California.

The head of the slough is in Belmont, California, just east of U.S. Route 101, slightly north of the exit for Ralston Avenue / Marine Parkway. The slough takes a winding course generally northeast from there, passing to the north of the Redwood Shores Oracle campus (completed in 1989, formerly Marine World/Africa USA) and south of Port Royal Park in Foster City. From there, the slough turns almost directly north, then east, then north again, and finally northeast as it enters the tidal exchange zone with the San Francisco Bay, an area characterized by shallow mudflats.

Both the Foster City and Redwood Shores shorelines of Belmont Slough are protected by the California Department of Fish and Wildlife as the 268-acre (108 ha) Redwood Shores Ecological Reserve, which is northwest of the adjacent Don Edwards San Francisco Bay National Wildlife Refuge and Bair Island Ecological Reserve.

== History ==
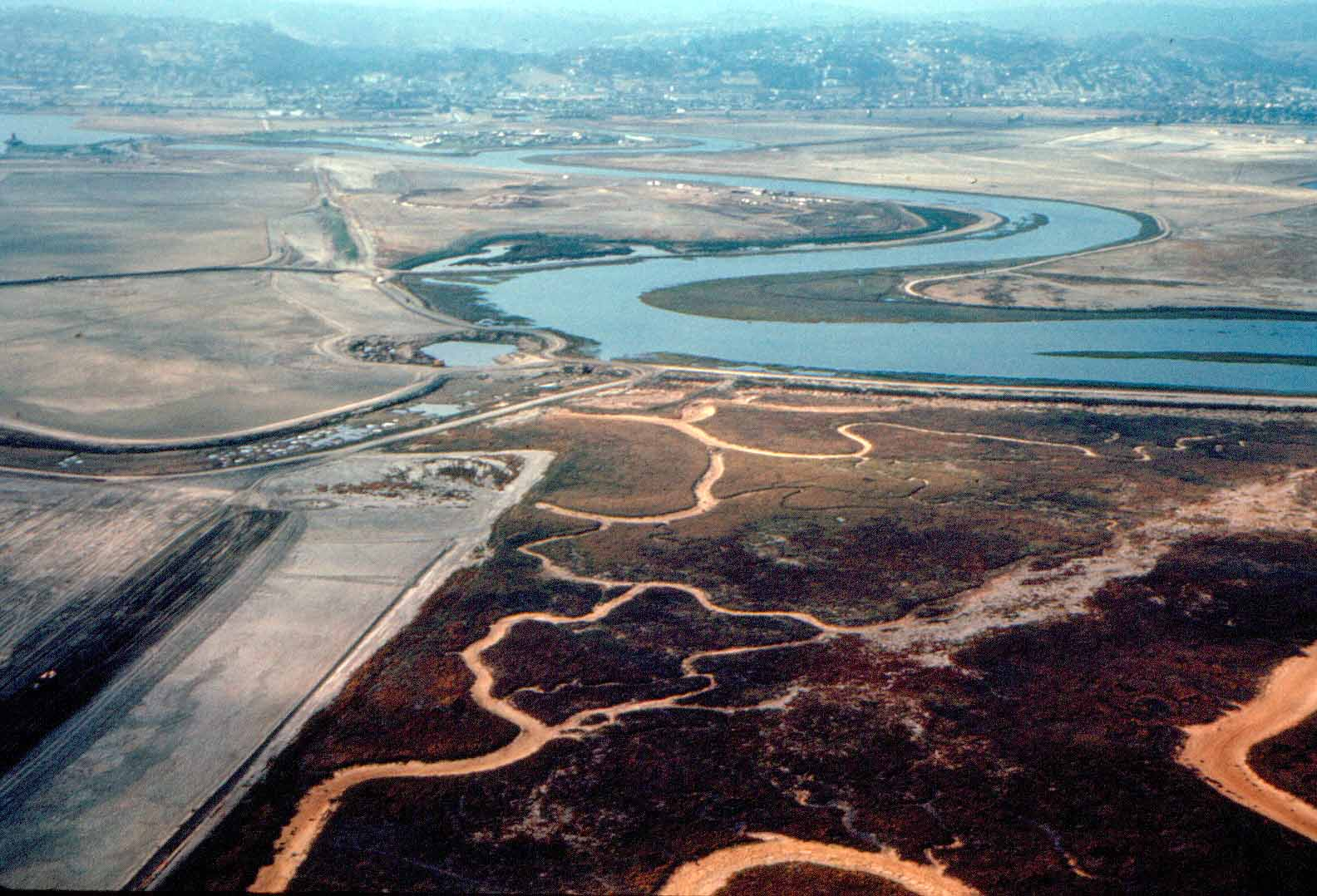
Belmont Slough (1970), view directed southwest. This was taken before the development of Redwood Shores (east of the Slough, on the left side of this photograph) and Foster City (west / right). The southern tip of Bat Ray Island is visible within the Slough.

In the early 1900s the slough was considered the best place to hunt ducks in San Mateo County, with the birds so plentiful, hunters could sneak up on them.

Foster City established the slough as a nature preserve in 1973. The main route of the San Francisco Bay Trail runs along the perimeter of Foster City, including the western border along Belmont Slough. The city maintains several spur trails off the Bay Trail along the western shore of Belmont Slough, including trails that lead to a beach area and the Foster City sign, visible from aircraft landing at nearby San Francisco International Airport. The intake structure for the Foster City Lagoon, which provides flood control and recreational opportunities for the city, is at the western end of Angelo Slough; Angelo Slough is a stub waterway connected to Belmont Slough running east–west, just north of Bat Ray Island.

The California State Lands Commission acquired the shoreline areas along Belmont Slough in an exchange with Mobil Oil Corporation in 1976.

== Ecology ==
The salt marshes surrounding Belmont Slough contain stands of cordgrass and pickleweed and serve as feeding areas for rails, herons, and other shorebirds; the levees built to reclaim the land for Foster City and Redwood Shores host gum plant, which provides nesting grounds for the Bay salt marsh song sparrow. Small rodents that live in the area are predated upon by the white-tailed kite, short-eared owl, and marsh harrier. Other animals that may be found near Belmont Slough include the California black rail, California clapper rail, Western snowy plover, Alameda song sparrow, and pallid bat.

== See also ==
- Belmont Creek
