= Belmont Creek =

Creek in California

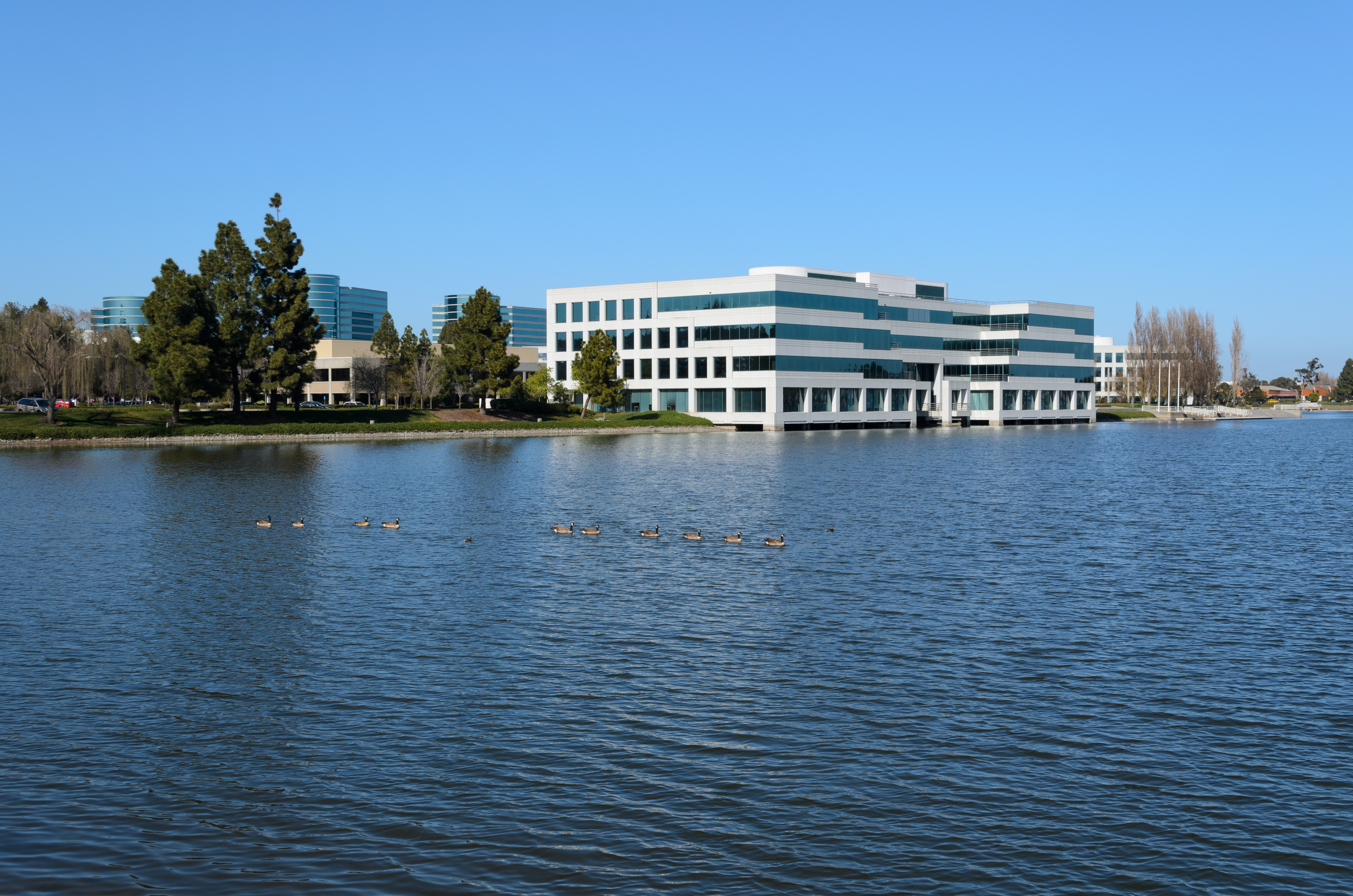

Location
- Country: United States

Physical characteristics
- Mouth
  - location: Redwood Shores, California
  - coordinates: 37°31′44″N 122°16′11″W

Belmont Creek is a creek in San Mateo County, California. The creek rises in Belmont and flows east under the Bayshore Freeway entering the Belmont Slough in Redwood Shores.

== Watershed and course ==
Belmont Creek drains a watershed of approximately 1,900 acres. From Water Dog Lake, the creek runs for approximately three miles through Belmont to the San Carlos border. In downtown Belmont, it passes beneath Sixth Avenue and El Camino Real. Belmont Creek is a major storm-drainage collector that discharges into San Francisco Bay through Belmont Slough. The creek includes reaches with vegetated channel banks, rock lining, concrete-rubble lining, concrete lining, and concrete culverts.

== Flooding ==
Flooding affects the lower portion of Belmont Creek between El Camino Real and U.S. Route 101 in the Harbor/Industrial Area, including the low-lying area around Old County Road and Industrial Road. According to the 2019 watershed plan, sediment accumulation and head losses around bends and culvert openings contribute to flooding in this area. The plan reported that the existing drainage network could accommodate a "10-year storm", an event with a 10% chance of occurring in any given year, while more severe events could overwhelm downstream sections. During severe storms in late 2022 and early 2023, Belmont Trailer Park experienced prolonged flooding, and multiple Caltrain underpasses, including the one at Harbor Boulevard, were closed.
