= Foster City Marina =

Planned development in California, US

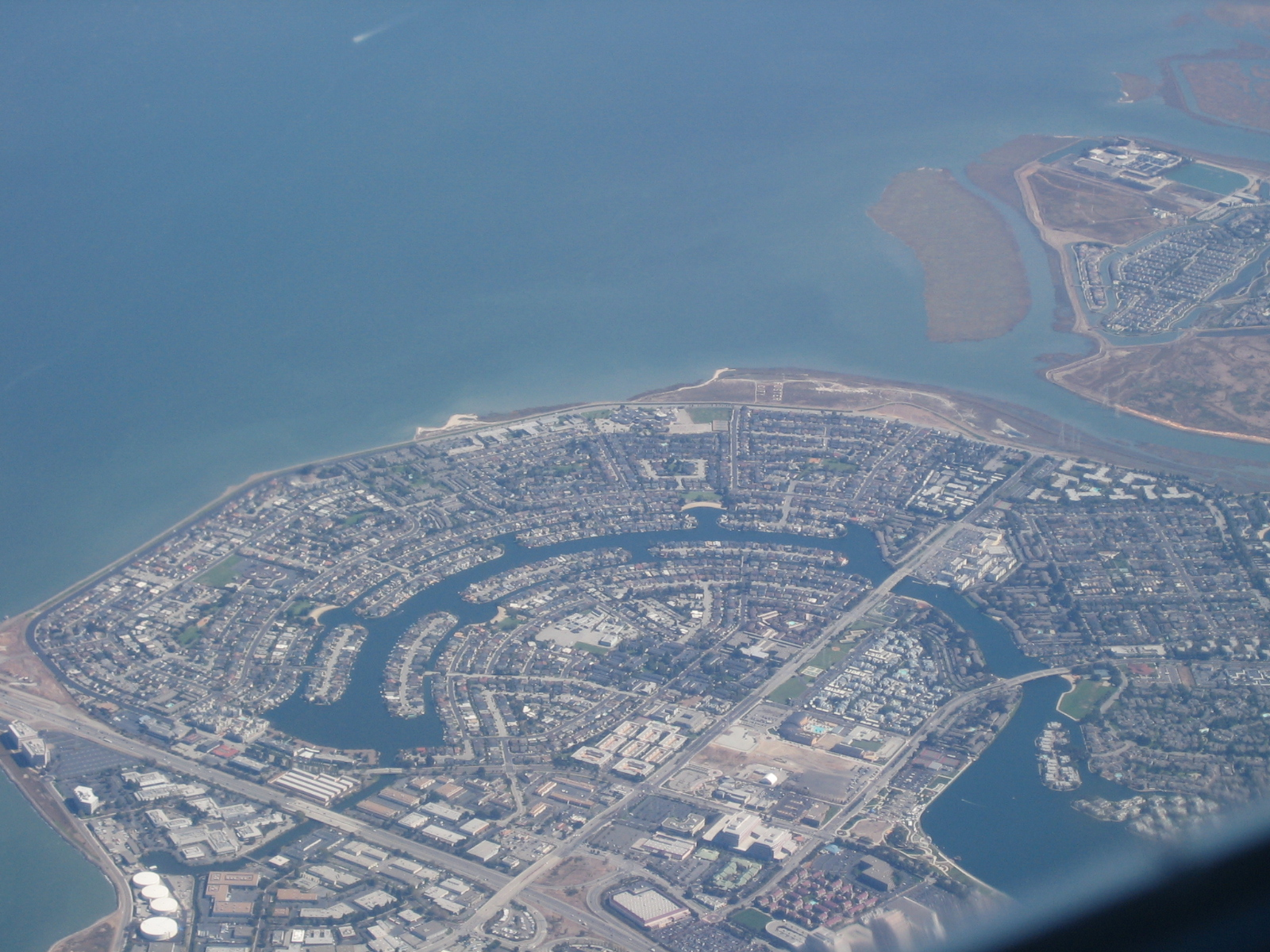
Aerial view of Foster City and Marina

The Foster City Marina is a planned facility for waterfront land use and boat berthing in Foster City, California. The site area is 60 acres (24 ha) and the marina site is the only land use designated as "waterfront commercial" by the city's General Plan. The original formal planning for the Foster City Marina began in the mid 1980s when the city council authorized Earth Metrics Inc to prepare an Environmental Impact Report for the marina use. The marina is designed to provide berthing for 750 vessels, and this site has been the focus of considerable political debate as to the timing of development.

In February 2014 the city council received a new development proposal, the fifth since 1973. The project proposal describes a mixed-use development with 273 apartment units and 27,500 square feet of commercial space, plus a marina with 214 boat slips and harbormaster building. The site is a wetland area to the east of Beach Park Boulevard, adjacent to the intersections with Halibut and Swordfish streets. Any development of this wetland area faces significant hurdles, and requires approval from up to 11 different agencies.

== See also ==
- Leo J. Ryan Memorial Park
