= Brewer Island =

Island in California

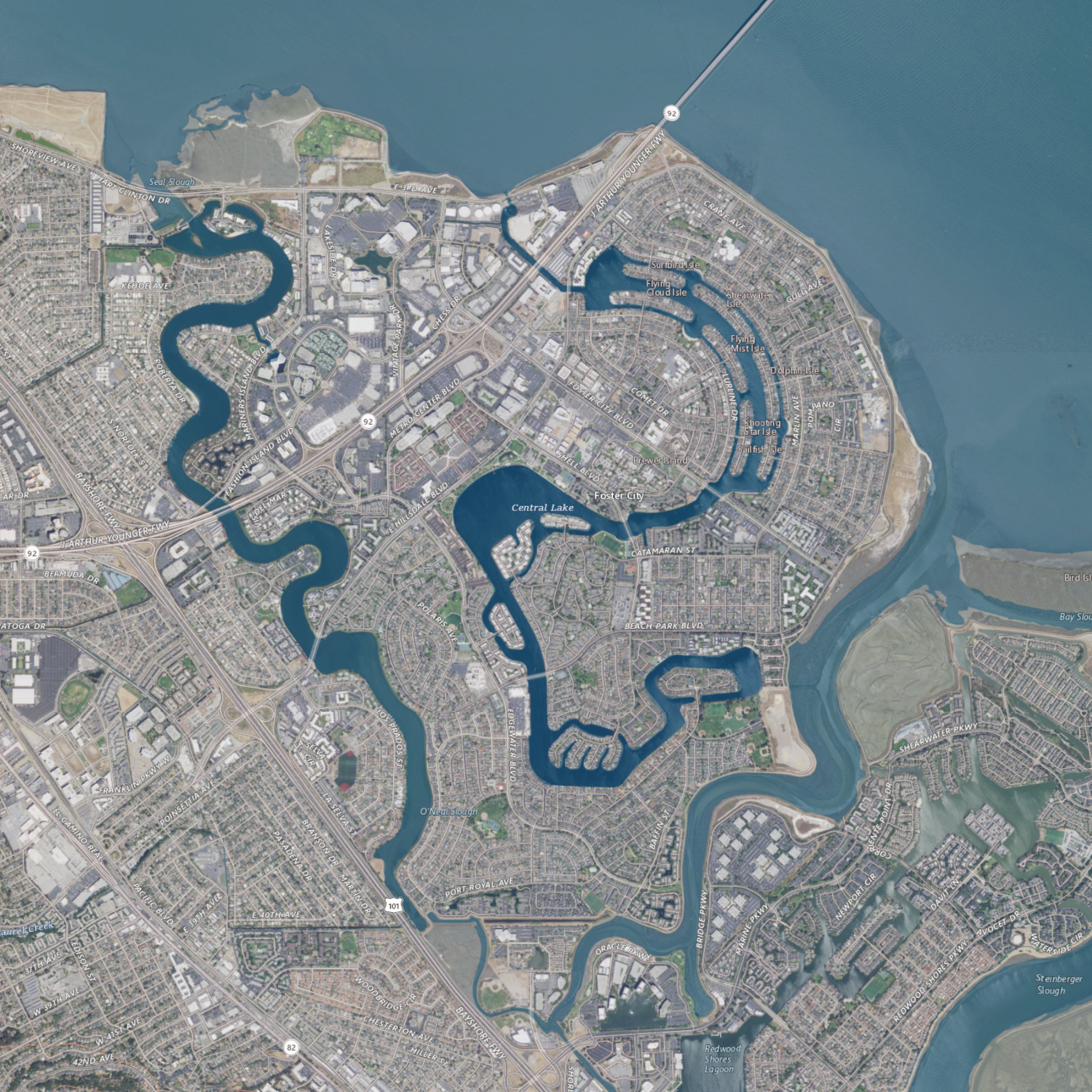
- USGS aerial imagery of Brewer Island
- Interactive map of Brewer Island

Geography
- Location: Northern California
- Coordinates: 37°33′25″N 122°15′50″W
- Adjacent to: San Francisco Bay
- Highest elevation: 7 ft (2.1 m)

Administration
- United States
- State: California
- County: San Mateo

Brewer Island is an island in the San Francisco Bay, in San Mateo County, California. Originally owned by W. P. A. Brewer, for over one hundred years it was used for hay farming. Several attempts to develop the island failed between 1912 and 1959. Ultimately, a venture by Richard Grant and T. Jack Foster succeeded in 1960; Brewer Island's surface was raised by 6 ft (1.8 m), an artificial lake was dug in its center, and it became the location of what is now known as Foster City.

== Geography ==
As marsh land covered in sloughs, Brewer Island appears in United States Geological Survey (USGS) maps dating to 1892 (the earliest available for the area). In 1894, it appears on an official map of San Mateo County; the first USGS map in which it is labeled "Brewer Island" is in 1939. The USGS gave its elevation as 7 ft (2.1 m) in 1981. Since being surrounded by levees in the 1890s, and built up with fill in the 1960s, Brewer Island is no longer marshland.

On the north, Brewer Island is bounded by mud flats of San Francisco Bay. To its east and southeast is Belmont Slough. To its south is O'Neill Slough, and to its west is Seal Slough; across these lies the city of San Mateo. It is crossed by California State Route 92; the San Mateo–Hayward Bridge terminates on the northern end of Brewer Island.

Brewer Island consists mostly of dry land, with a system of lagoons in the center providing drainage; the water in these lagoons is kept at a controlled level, with excess being pumped into San Francisco Bay. The lagoons and waterways of the island, which cover approximately 200 acres (81 ha), are also used for recreation.

== History ==
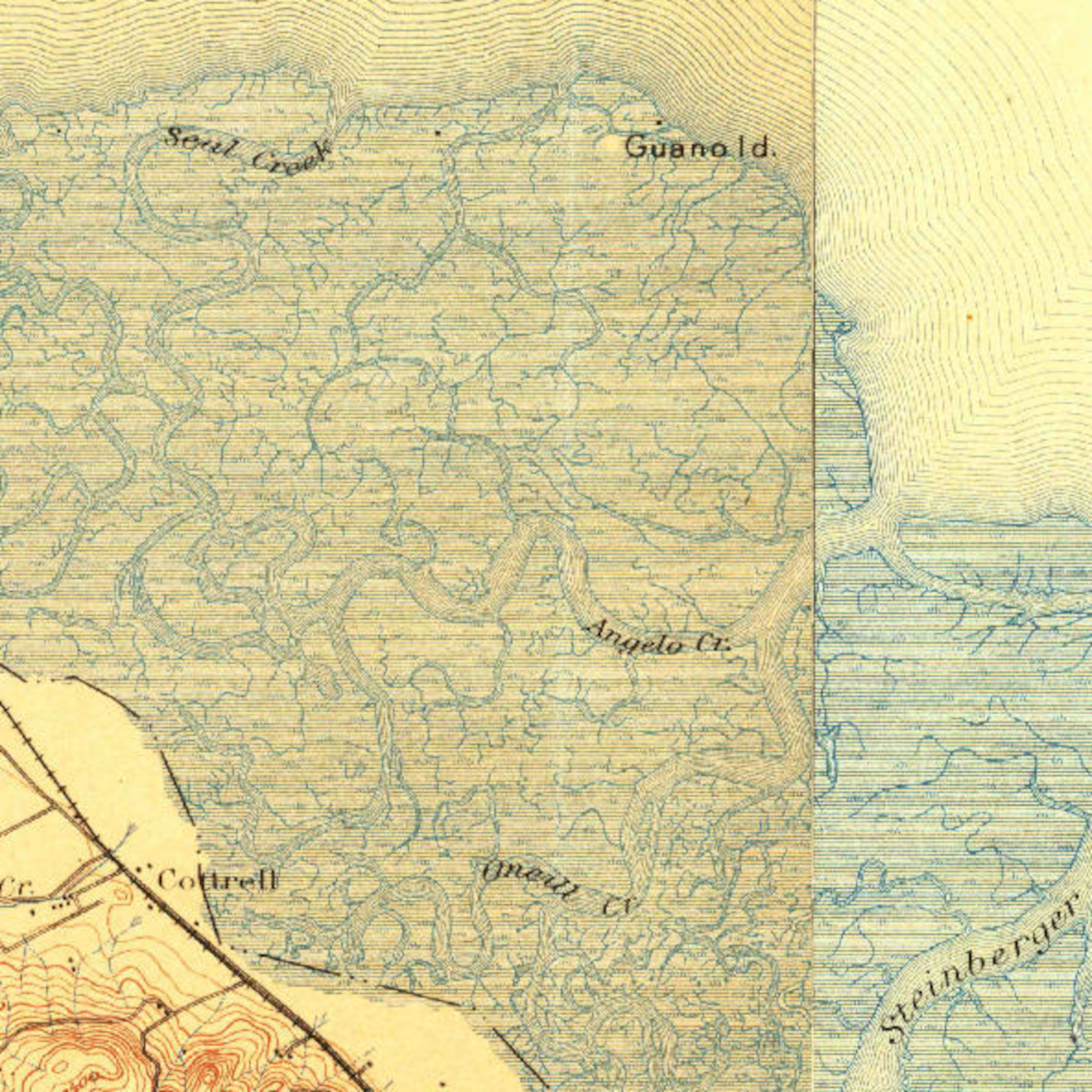
Current area in a 1899 USGS survey map

In prehistoric times, the area later occupied by Brewer Island was "situated at the bay margin in an area of extensive marshlands". While California was inhabited by humans as early as the 10th millennium BC, evidence of such habitation has not been found on Brewer Island. However, by the time of European settlement in the mid-19th century, Brewer Island was part of territory controlled by Ohlone hunter-gatherers.

Starting in the 1860s, the shoals surrounding the island were used by the Morgan Oyster Company, founded by J. S. Morgan (which "came to monopolize the Bay Area's oyster industry").

Brewer Island was created in the late 1800s by Arthur L. Whitney and E. B. Pond, who built a series of levees around the salt marsh to reclaim the land for agricultural use. From this point onward, it was used to produce hay and graze cattle.

Buildings are known to have existed on the island at this time, with an 1894 map showing buildings labeled "House", "Wharf", and "Chinese Fish House". The island was named for William P. A. Brewer, who purchased large amounts of land on the island in 1898 and used it to run the San Mateo Ranch Dairy. The Brewer family also had a beach house on the shore of the island. When William died in 1905, his son Frank became the owner of the dairy, and of the island.

=== Unsuccessful developments ===
==== Hog farm (1912) ====
In the early 20th century, a hog farm was proposed to be operated on Brewer Island. In 1912, however, numerous parties entered protests to the San Mateo County Board of Supervisors, urging them to deny it a permit. The land remained undeveloped.

==== "Elaborate plans" (1923) ====
By 1923, the Morgan Oyster Company had gone out of business; meanwhile, preparations were being made for the construction of two bridges across San Francisco Bay. "Elaborate plans" were formulated for Brewer Island's development, as it was near the San Mateo end of one proposed bridge. However, the land remained undeveloped.

==== Army aviation base (1929) ====
In 1929, two island sites in San Francisco Bay were being considered by the government for an Army aviation base; Brewer Island was one, and Alameda was the other. The San Mateo Times said that "The San Francisco Chamber of Commerce never had a better opportunity of practically demonstrating its desire to aid in the development of the Peninsula than is offered in the present campaign to obtain the location of the United States army aviation base in this vicinity." The argument in favor of using Brewer Island was that it could be used immediately, as the Alameda site "would require an enormous amount of fill before it could be improved for aviation purposes". The site, which was offered to the War Department for free, comprised some 350 acres (140 ha).

The owner of Brewer Island, Arden Salt Company principal Rudolph Schilling, agreed to offer the island as a site for the aviation base. Local organizations and committees "worked indefatigably on the air base offer for eight months." In August, the Times reported that "members of the military affairs committee of the house of representatives are on their way to the bay region from Cuba to make an inspection of Brewer Island and other sites proposed", for a base estimated to cost $5,000,000 ($91.6 million in 2024).

However, before they could arrive, Schilling withdrew his offer. He refused to explain why, saying only that he had done so for "important reasons". The site at Alameda would eventually become Naval Air Station Alameda; on Brewer Island, the land remained undeveloped.

==== Seaplane base (1935) ====
San Mateo County again offered Brewer Island as a potential military site in 1935; this time as a seaplane base. At that time, transportation and weather data were also being prepared for proposed sites on Belle Air Island. These plans never materialized, and the land remained undeveloped.

==== City airport (1945) ====
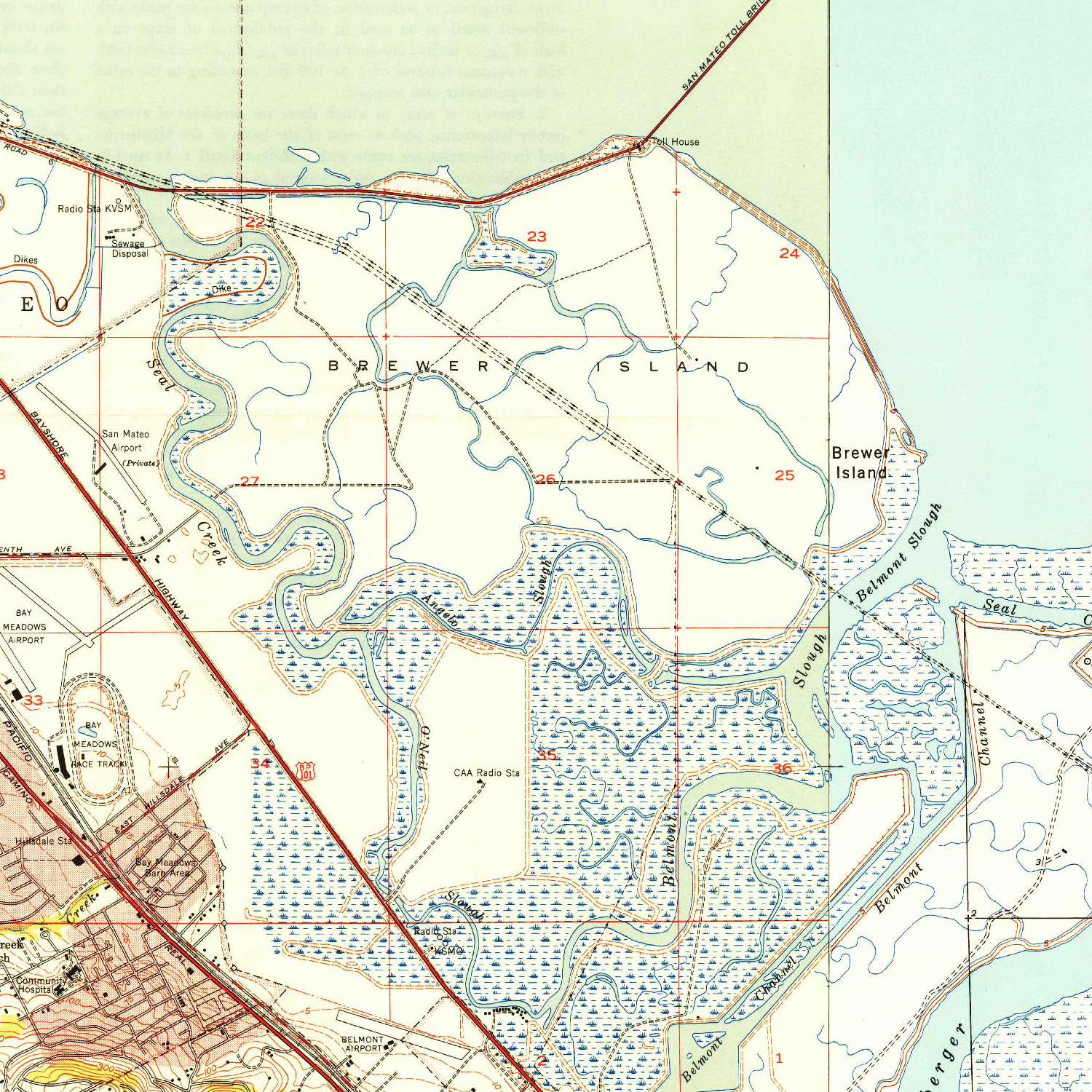
1949 USGS survey map

Ten years later, Brewer Island was the subject of another proposed development when it was selected by a meeting of the Burlingame and San Mateo chambers of commerce as their desired future location for a planned San Mateo Airport. This development was projected to cost $250,000 ($4.37 million in 2024); while other locations were being looked at, the amount of available acreage on Brewer Island—1,700 acres (690 ha)—as well as the low cost were cited as driving factors. Nonetheless, by June, the San Mateo Chamber of Commerce had selected the alternate Bay Meadows site for the airport; the Burlingame Chamber of Commerce "reiterated its stand" that Brewer Island should be chosen. Ultimately, the Civil Aeronautics Administration engineer forbade the use of Brewer Island, determining that aircraft approaches would interfere with safe operation of radio facilities. In 1952, the city of San Mateo conducted a study of the viability of Brewer Island for residential and industrial development, but the land remained undeveloped.

==== County airport (1953) ====
In 1953, Brewer Island was again suggested for development as an airport; George Van Vliet, chairman of San Mateo's county aviation committee, presented a proposal to the county's Board of Supervisors recommending that the island be used for a central county airport. The committee cited the potential wartime utility of an airport, as well as recreational potential and the possibility of the county expanding its tax base as benefits of such a development. However, these plans did not succeed, and the land remained undeveloped.

==== A single storage shed (1954) ====
By 1954, nearly a half-century of efforts by various private and governmental entities toward developing the island had culminated in several shacks which seasonal workers slept in during the haying season, as well as a storage shed used to house some two hundred pheasants. The storage shed burned to the ground in July. The land remained undeveloped.

=== Successful developments ===
==== Foster City (1954–1962) ====
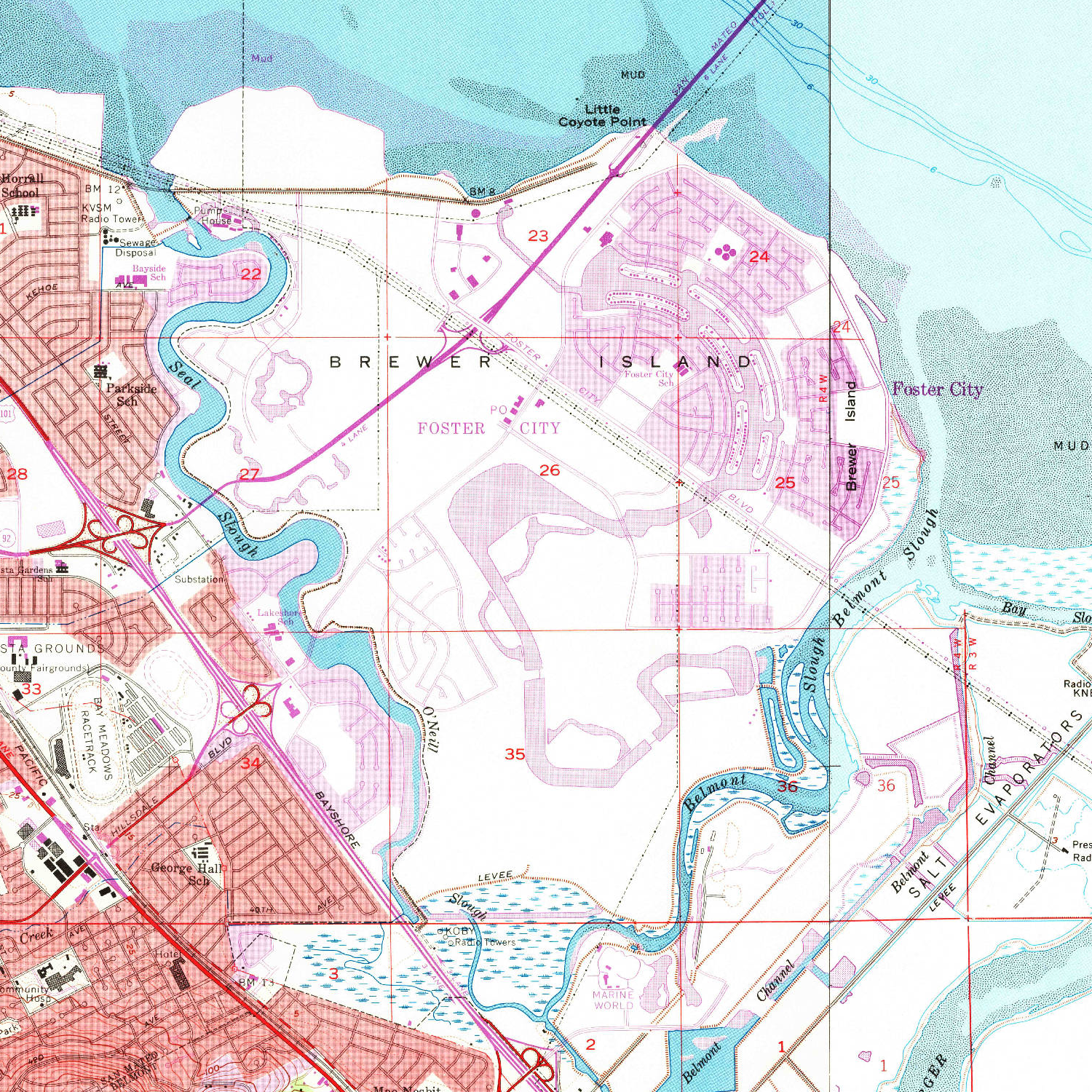
1956 USGS survey map

In the later half of 1954, the development of Brewer Island was proposed yet again; this time, it was part of a bayside expansion plan for the city of San Mateo. On August 4, it was reported that plans for a "city within a city" included as many as 10,000 homes and 35,000 residents.

By August 26, a Citizens' Pro-Industry Committee, composed of several "civic, service, and improvement club leaders", had been organized to protest the development of homes on the island. James Tormey, the county superintendent of schools, told the Board of Supervisors that the full development would create a $10,000,000 ($117 million in 2024) "bonding deficit on the elementary and high school district levels, and a substantial tax increase within the district". He said that "the effects of building 10,000 homes would be the same whether the subdivision were on Brewer Island or in the hills. The difference lies in the fact that Brewer Island could be used for light industry and the hills could not".

The next year, Brewer Island remained the "biggest single undeveloped area in the county", and San Mateo city planners were "voicing fear of the bugaboo of Brewer Island's residential development". In July they "informally vetoed" a proposed revision of the city's street map which included a skeleton layout of streets on Brewer Island.

In October 1955, negotiations were underway for the sale of Thomas Therkildsen's 328 acres (133 ha) property on the island to real estate developer Thomas Culligan for between $1,000,000 and $1,250,000 ($11.7 million and $14.7 million in 2024); the land was planned for use in a $40,000,000 ($1.64 billion in 2024) "Fiesta Gardens type of home development". This would involve some 1,800 homes, which would be sold for $18,000 to $20,000 each ($211,282 to $234,758 in 2024). While it was initially unclear what amount of the land would be set aside for industrial use, and how it would be annexed to San Mateo, initial plans featured a $1,000,000 ($11.7 million in 2024) "industrial area, major business center, and recreational compound complete with swimming pool and 9-hole golf course". Development would require large amounts of fill dirt to raise the land, taken from hills to the west of San Mateo.

In 1958, the city of San Mateo's master plan included a "water sports center" on Brewer Island, consisting of a "system of inland waterways along the bayshore" developed from existing sloughs. By that point, the Therkildsen lands (now 353 acres (143 ha)) were proposed for a $100,000,000 ($1.09 billion in 2024) recreational development; Therkildsen's representative Ray Holdren said that "he did not want any comparison with Disneyland, and that the project here would be larger and somewhat different in character". This plan would have included "a hotel-inn, auditorium, baseball park, stadium, marina, horse show arena, central plaza, western town, stables and corrals, stockade museum, zoo, miniature working ranch [...] heliport, Indian village and museum, mock gold mine and museum, picnic and camp sites, Junior league baseball parks, tennis club, golf course, polo field, Country club, beach and trap shooting" as well as "permanent international displays of Mexico, Copenhagen, the Middle East, Hawaii, South America, Holland, Venice, France, Japan and England". The proposal drew "varied reactions"; some spoke positively of the "tremendous advantage to be gleaned from high tax-producing develop of the island, preferred in many quarters to home development". Others said that the project would "have to be a bang-up job or could cause a blight on the community".

This ambitious proposal was to "officially hit the wastebasket" by 1959; county officials returned to debating the virtue of industrial versus residential use of the land. Meanwhile, Brewer Island remained undeveloped, and a haystack caught fire in March of that year. The Leslie Salt Company, which at that time controlled approximately 2,200 acres (890 ha) of the island, began official negotiations to annex the island to the city of San Mateo in April. By 1960, an approximately $10,000,000 ($106 million in 2024) option-purchase agreement had been recorded for the island. The transaction involved developer Richard Grant and financier T. Jack Foster, who proposed a $350,000,000 ($3.72 billion in 2024) "self-supporting, balanced community of industry, apartments, businesses, schools, recreational facilities and homes for an estimated 45,000 residents". The development was planned "so that a newcomer finding a job will also find a vacant and available dwelling at the same time"; houses were expected to sell for between $25,000 and $150,000 ($265,720 to $1.59 million in 2024). Also planned were "a championship golf course, a beach, a yacht harbor, theatres, public swimming pools, parks and playgrounds" in addition to "a community center, libraries, medical buildings, churches, shopping facilities and adequate parking" and a "small-size 'Radio City' for offices, recording studios, and TV production".

Brewer Island's last hay harvest was in 1960; at this point, construction began on Grant and Foster's developments. This involved dredging around 22,000,000 cu yd (17,000,000 m^{3}) of sand from San Francisco Bay for fill, raising land on the island by as much as 6 ft (1.8 m). Dredging was also used to create a lake in the center of the island, for a 100 acres (40 ha) "recreational and boating area". This was claimed by the developers to be "America's first 'new city', the first completely planned from raw land to the tallest building, with all utilities, roads, and other developments pre-determined prior to commencement of the city's construction". At this point, Brewer Island had become Foster City.

==== Foster City (1963–present) ====
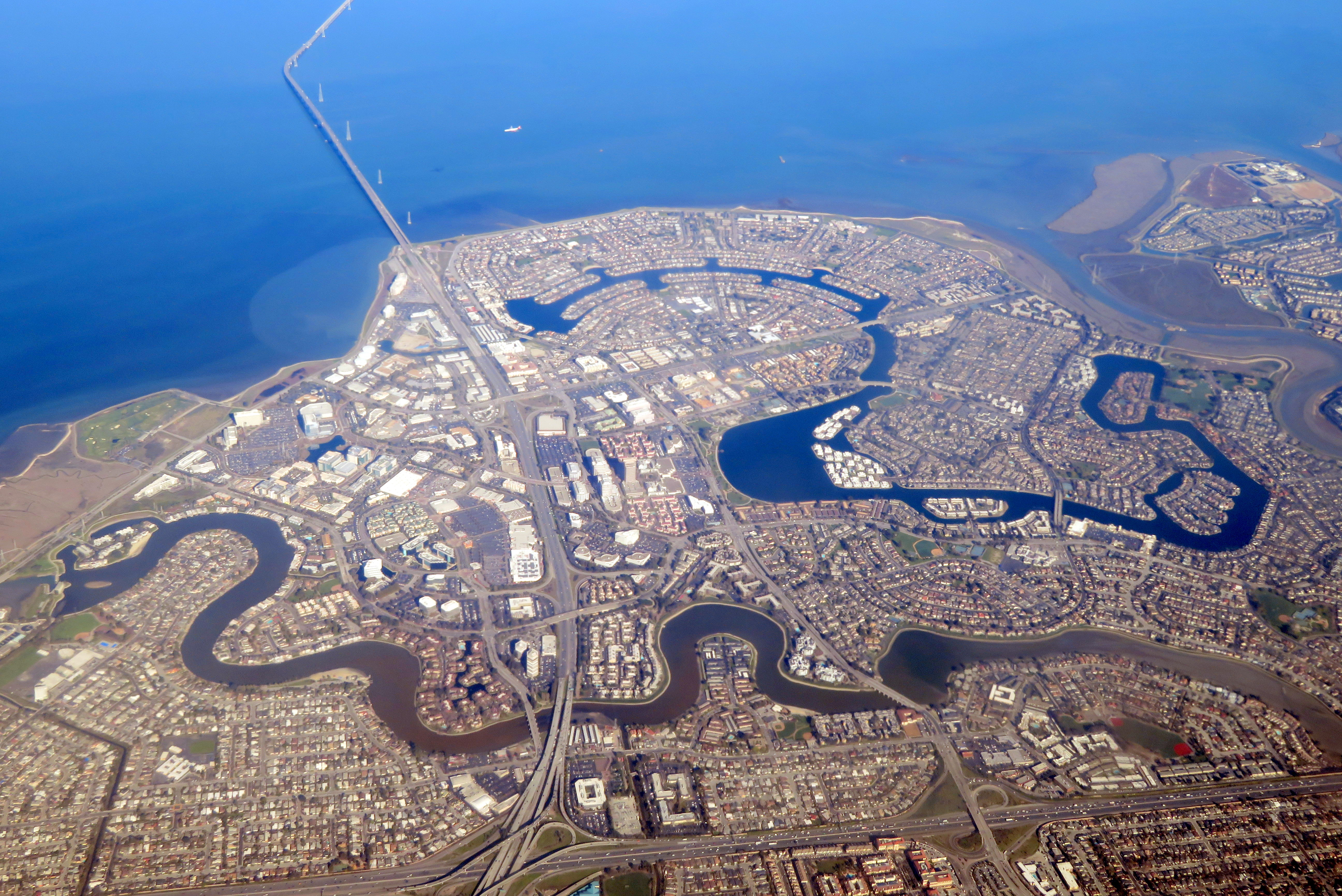
Foster City in 2018

Foster City incorporated in 1971, with Wayne McFadden as its first mayor. A period of "intense political dissension" followed, including two years (1971 and 1977) in which four separate City managers were appointed and dismissed. The city claims on its website that it has had "stable leadership" since then. In 1983, the levees were reinforced by Caltrans. Further improvements were made during the 1990s, at which time the levees were raised 18 in (460 mm) and a concrete stormwall was constructed (as well as access ramps for a pedestrian/bicycle trail on the levees' crest).

The population of Foster City, according to the 2020 United States Census, was 33,805; corporations located there include Gilead Sciences and Visa.
