= Zoox =

Self-driving taxi company

Zoox, Inc.
- Type: Subsidiary
- Industry: Automotive
- Founded: July 29, 2014; 12 years ago
- Founders: Tim Kentley-Klay; Jesse Levinson
- Headquarters: Foster City, California
- Area served: Las Vegas, Nevada, United States
- Key people: Aicha Evans (CEO)
- Products: Self-driving cars
- Number of employees: c. 2,200 (2023)
- Parent: Amazon.com, Inc.
- Website: zoox.com

Zoox, Inc. is an American technology company subsidiary of Amazon developing driverless vehicles that provide mobility as a service. It is headquartered in Foster City, California, and has offices of operations in the San Francisco Bay Area and Seattle. Zoox is a part of the Amazon Devices & Services organization along with other Amazon units like Amazon Lab126, Amazon Alexa, and Amazon Leo.

== History ==
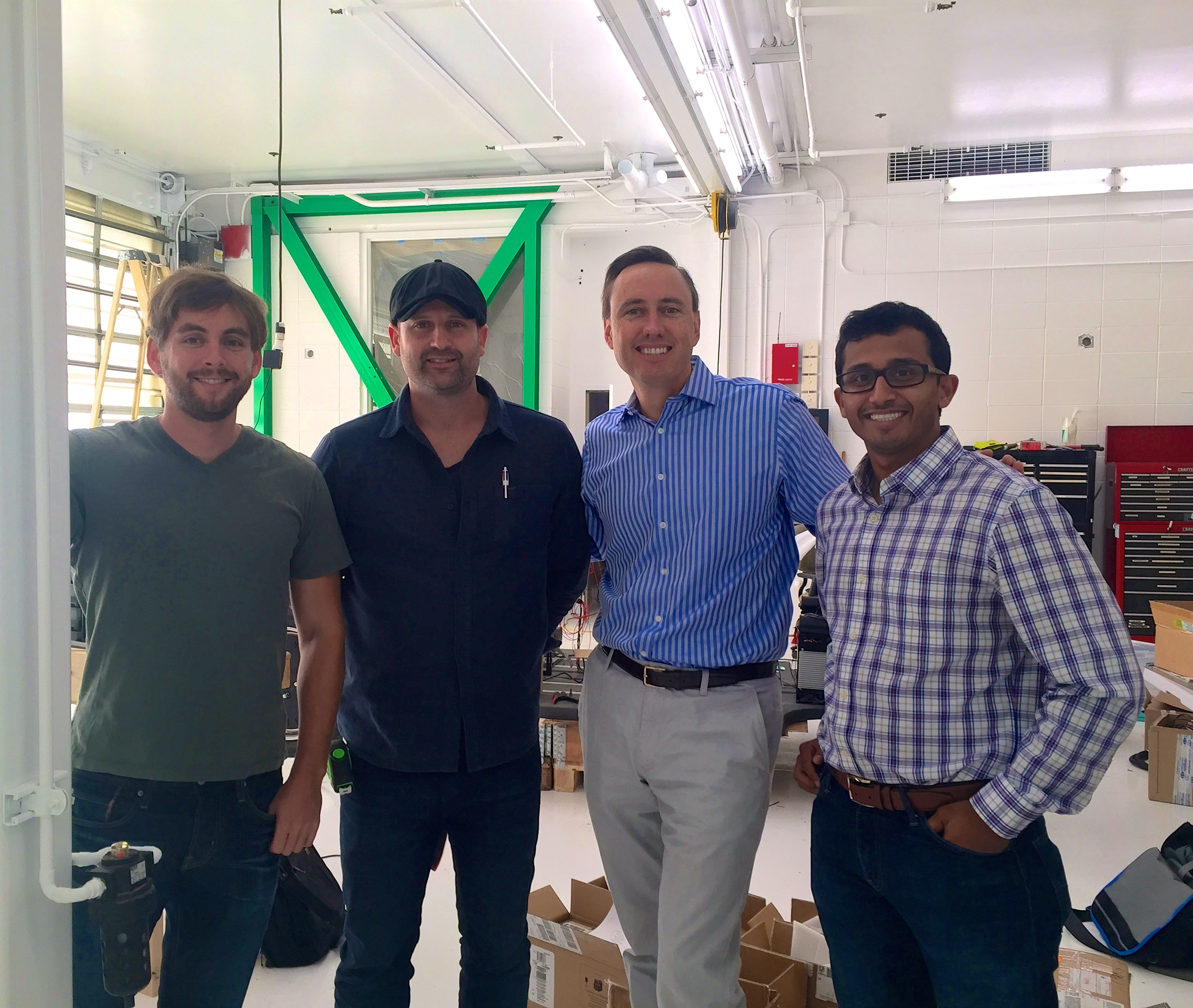
Left to right: Jesse Levinson, Tim Kentley Klay, Steve Jurvetson and Mo Islam (2015)

Zoox was founded in 2014 by Australian artist-designer Tim Kentley-Klay and Jesse Levinson, son of Apple Incorporated chairman Arthur D. Levinson, who was developing self-driving technology at Stanford University. The name "Zoox" is a reference to Zooxanthellae, a marine organism that, like the Zoox robotaxi, depends on renewable energy and is able to maintain a symbiotic relationship with organisms in its surrounding habitat.

In January 2019, Zoox appointed a new CEO, Aicha Evans, who was previously the Chief Strategy Officer at Intel. On June 26, 2020, Amazon and Zoox signed a definitive merger agreement, under which Amazon acquired Zoox as a wholly owned subsidiary for over $1.2 billion. As is the case with other Amazon subsidiaries like Amazon Web Services, Zoox has no independent board of directors, but operates as a separate legal entity with its own governance structure. Zoox is a part of the Amazon Devices & Services organization with Evans reporting into Amazon Senior Vice President, Panos Panay.

== Services ==
Zoox service areas in the United States

As of January 2026, Zoox has approximately 50 robotaxis in service.

Service areas in the United States
State	Metro area	Status	Launch date	Area served	Ref.
Arizona	Phoenix	Testing	—	—	
California	Los Angeles	Testing	—	—	
California	San Diego	Testing	—	—	
California	San Francisco	Waitlist service	—	—	
Colorado	Denver	Testing	—	—	
Florida	Miami	Service announced	—	—	
Georgia	Atlanta	Testing	—	—	
Nevada	Las Vegas	Full commercial service	September 10, 2025 (Note: Initially launched as a free public trial (with no waitlist). Zoox began charging riders on August 10, 2026.)	Las Vegas Strip	
Texas	Austin	Service announced	—	—	
Texas	Dallas	Testing	—	—	
Texas	Houston	Testing	—	—	
Washington	Seattle	Testing	—	—	
Washington, D.C.		Testing	—	—	

Airport service in the United States
State	Airport	Status	Launch date	Ref.
Nevada	Harry Reid International Airport	Full commercial service	September 3, 2026	

== Technology ==
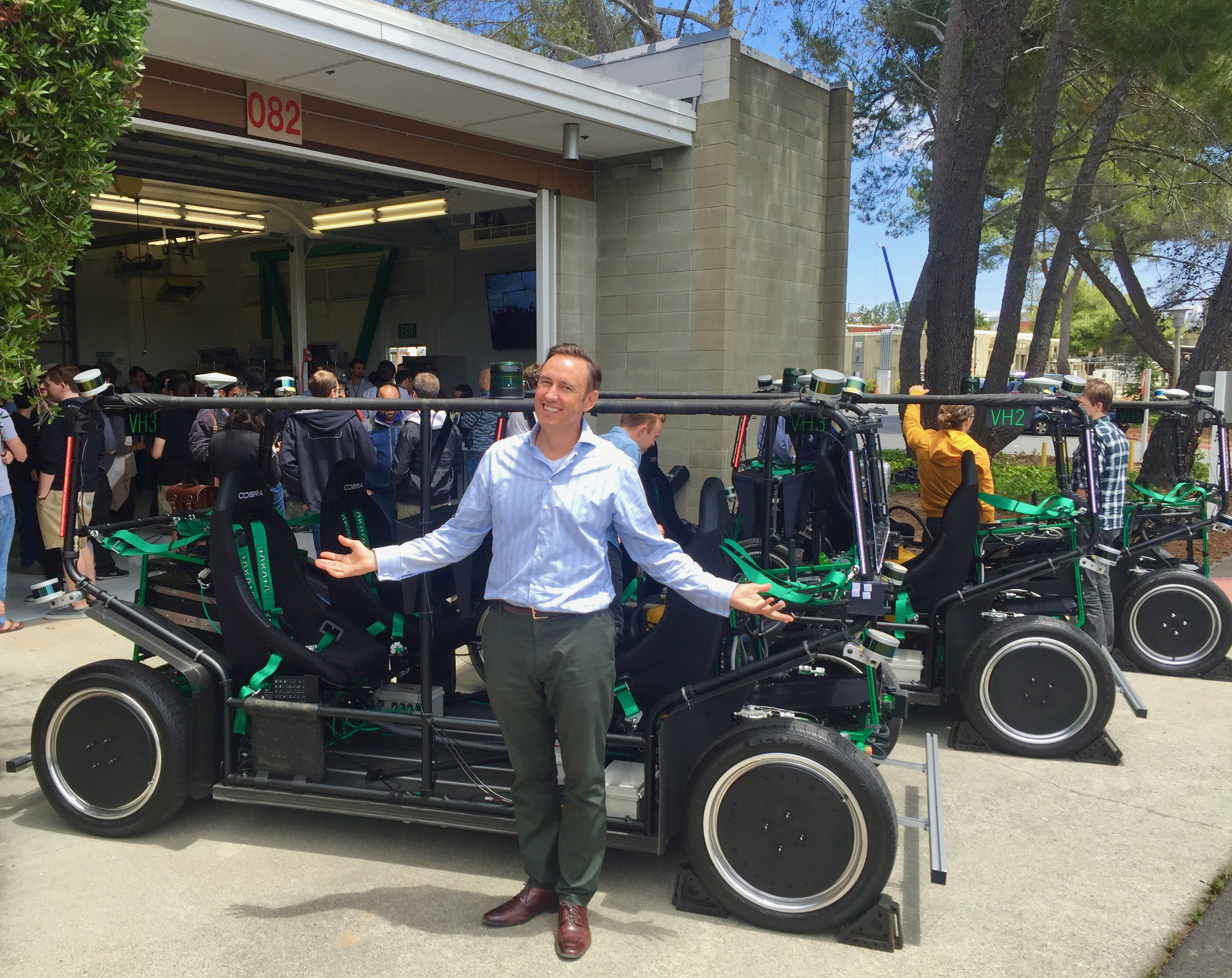
Early test vehicles at original Zoox headquarters in SLAC in 2016

Zoox develops autonomous, battery-electric vehicles targeted at the robotaxi market. The company's approach is centered on the fact that a retrofitted vehicle is not optimized for autonomy. Notable features of the company's vehicles include being symmetrical and bi-directional.

The company has used retrofitted Toyota Highlanders with their self-driving system in final preparation for their commercial vehicle reveal in December 2020. As of July 2018 test driving was taking place in both San Francisco's Financial District and North Beach districts, as well as Las Vegas.

== Progress and competition ==
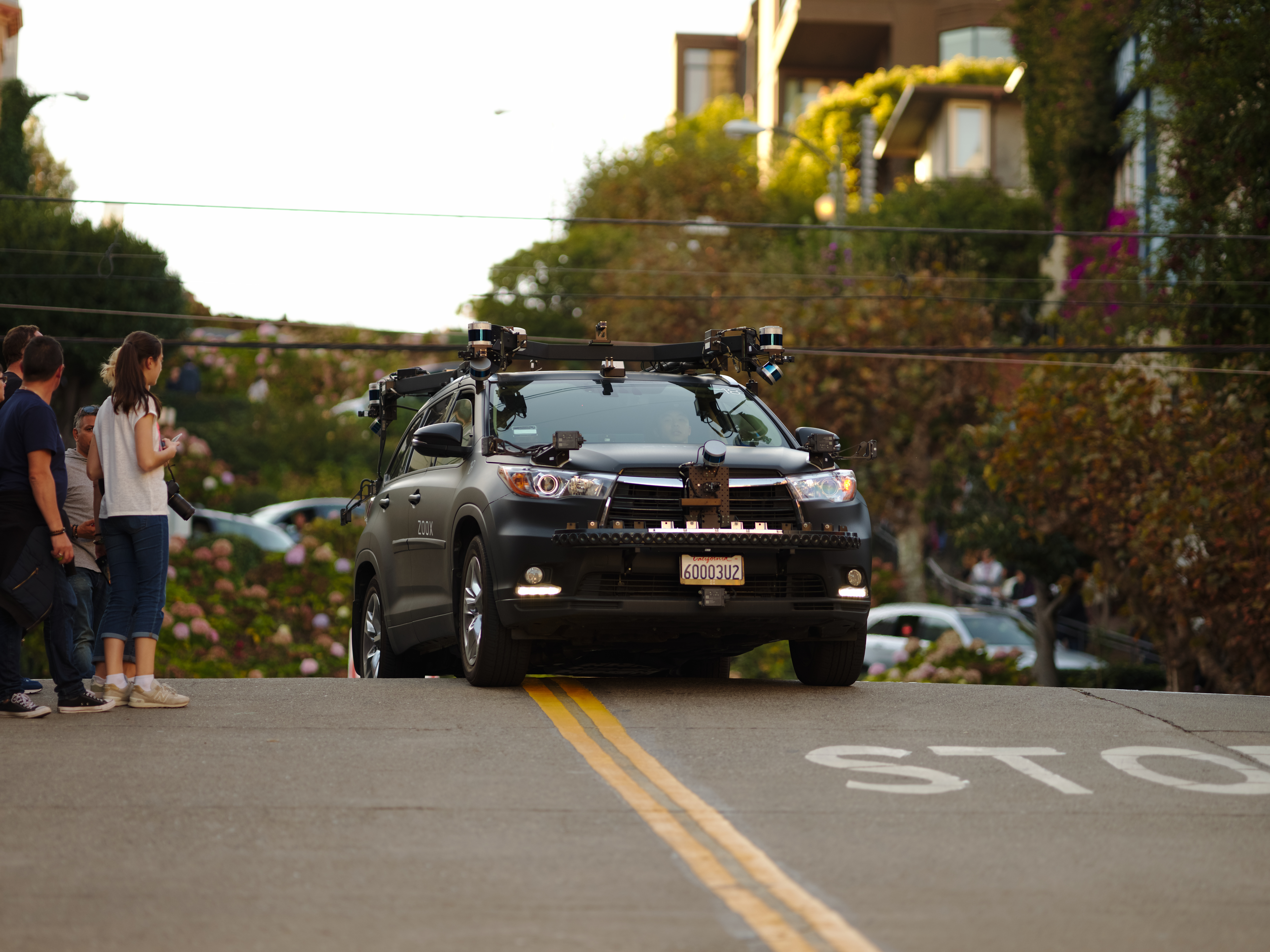
Zoox prototype testing in San Francisco in 2019

In December 2018, Zoox became the first company to gain approval for providing self-driving transport services to the public in California. By July 2018, according to Bloomberg, Zoox had raised $800 million in venture capital, at a valuation of $3.2 billion. Draper Fisher Jurvetson is an investor in the company. In September 2020, Zoox became the fourth company in the State of California to receive permit to test driverless automobiles on public roads. On December 14, 2020, Zoox showcased a fully autonomous, all-electric, purpose-built vehicle that is capable of driving up to 75 mph.

On March 20, 2019, Tesla, Inc. filed a lawsuit against Zoox and several now-former Tesla employees (who left Tesla for employment at Zoox) alleging theft of Tesla's proprietary information and trade secrets related to warehousing, shipping, and logistics in late 2018 and early 2019. The lawsuit was settled for an undisclosed sum in April 2020 where Zoox "acknowledged that certain of its new hires from Tesla were in possession of Tesla documents pertaining to shipping, receiving, and warehouse procedures when they joined Zoox's logistics team".

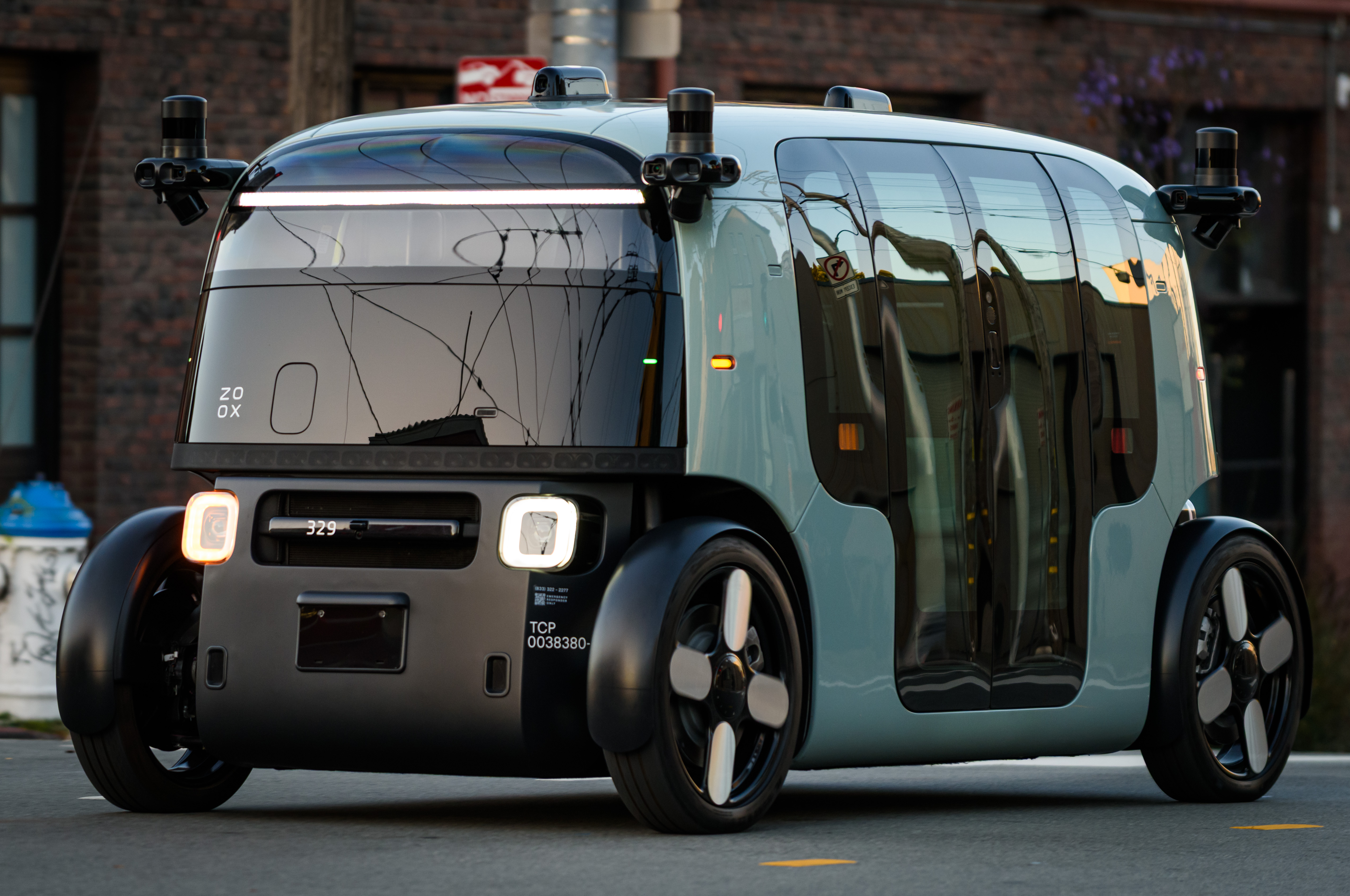
An electric Zoox Robotaxi in San Francisco in 2025

In July 2022, Zoox self-certified that its purpose-built, fully autonomous, all-electric passenger vehicle met the existing US Federal Motor Vehicle Safety Standards (FMVSS) without the need for regulatory changes or exemption requests. The US National Highway Traffic Safety Administration (NHTSA) has not granted Zoox an exemption from rules requiring vehicles to have controls including a steering wheel and pedals, and has an open investigation into this claim.

In 2023, Zoox was given approval by the California Department of Motor Vehicles (DMV) to begin testing self-driving robotaxis on open public roads with passengers on board. The DMV provided Zoox with a limited permit to operate on roads at speeds of up to 35 miles an hour at a designated area around its Foster City headquarters. In June 2023, Zoox expanded its facilities and operations to Las Vegas, Nevada, after being authorized by the Nevada Department of Motor Vehicles to operate its autonomous robotaxis on public roads.

In May 2024, the NHTSA launched an investigation into potential flaws in Zoox vehicles after two rear-end collisions involving motorbikes and Zoox vehicles.

On August 6, 2025, the NHTSA issued an exemption for Zoox driverless vehicles under its newly expanded Automated Vehicle Exemption Program. All of the purpose-built vehicles manufactured by Zoox and operating on public roads in the United States are now covered by this exemption. The Audit Query is now closed.

On September 10, 2025, Zoox officially began the robotaxi service in Las Vegas as an initially free service to transport riders to and from fixed destinations along the Las Vegas Strip, with plans to expand to more resorts and entertainment spots in the coming months.

On November 18, 2025, Zoox launched its robotaxi service to the public in San Francisco, marking a significant step in the company’s commercial progress. Operating through the "Zoox Explorers" program, the company began offering free rides to select users in its purpose-built autonomous vehicles within neighborhoods like SoMa and the Mission District. This launch directly accelerates Zoox's competition against Waymo, the Google subsidiary that already operates a fare-charging, driverless service in the city. There is currently a waitlist, but Zoox hopes to completely remove the wait list by 2026 as it adds more robotaxis to its fleet.

== Accidents and incidents ==
As of August 17, 2026, the National Highway Traffic Safety Administration (NHTSA) has logged 156 accidents involving Zoox vehicles in autonomous mode, of which a small number resulted in injury or property damage.

List of notable Zoox accidents:

- In 2024, two Zoox autonomous test vehicles were involved in separate rear-end collisions with motorcyclists after the vehicles allegedly braked unexpectedly. Both motorcyclists were injured. The incidents prompted an investigation by the National Highway Traffic Safety Administration (NHTSA), and Zoox subsequently issued a voluntary software recall.
- On April 4, 2025, a Zoox collided with an electric bicycle.
- On April 8, 2025, a Zoox collided with a passenger car; Zoox recalled its software in response.
- On May 8, 2025, a Zoox collided with an e-scooter; Zoox recalled its software in response.
- On January 17, 2026, a Zoox in San Francisco hit a car door while the driver was opening it, injuring the driver; according to Zoox, the robotaxi identified the door, but could not avoid hitting it. The San Francisco Police Department later launched an investigation.

=== Regulatory investigations ===
- In May 2024, NHTSA opened Preliminary Evaluation PE24015 to investigate Zoox's automated driving system following two crashes involving motorcyclists who rear-ended Zoox vehicles. The investigation focused on reports of unexpected braking and the system's interaction with vulnerable road users.
- In 2025, NHTSA reviewed Zoox's purpose-built robotaxi, which lacks conventional controls such as a steering wheel and pedals, to determine compliance with federal motor vehicle safety standards. The agency later granted an exemption permitting demonstration operations and closed the investigation.
