= Aicha Evans =

Senegalese-American business executive

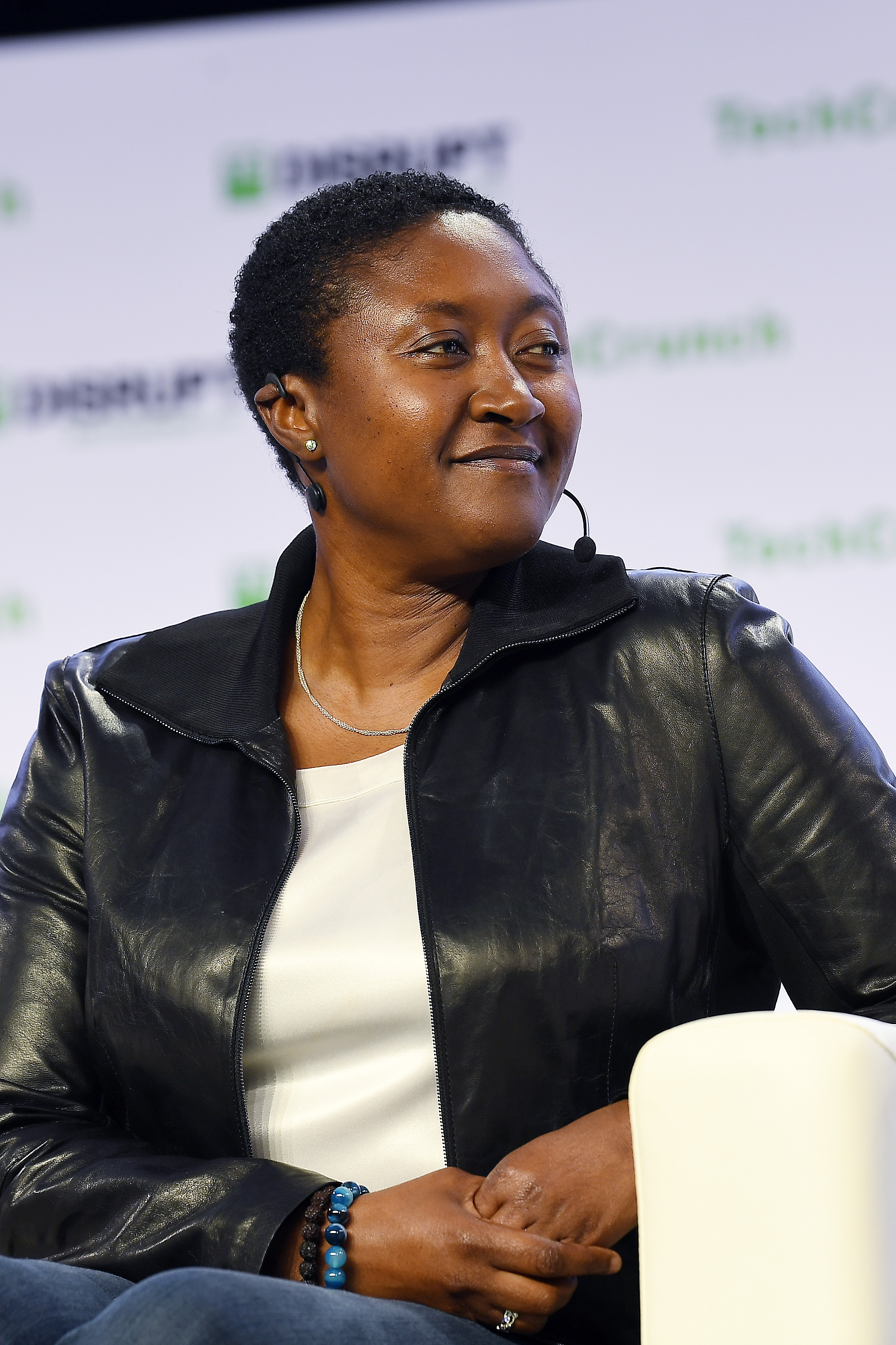
- Evans (2019)
- Born: 1969 (age 56–57); Senegal
- Education: The George Washington University
- Occupation: CEO of Zoox

Aichatou Sar Evans (born 1969), known professionally as Aicha Evans, is an American chief executive officer of Amazon's self-driving car subsidiary Zoox. In June 2020, Evans led the acquisition of her company by Amazon for US$1.3 billion.

== Early life and education ==
Evans was born in Senegal and spent her childhood in Paris. After immigrating to the United States, she studied at The George Washington University in Washington, D.C., where she received a bachelor's degree in Computer Engineering in 1996.

== Career ==
Evans has held engineering management positions at companies including Rockwell Semiconductor, Conexant, and Skyworks Solutions. Evans serves as a trustee for the Anita Borg Institute for Women & Technology.

Evans joined Intel in 2006, and spent 12 years with the firm, specializing in leading wireless engineering projects utilizing technologies like Bluetooth, Wireless LAN, XMM register, and 5G. In 2013, Evans assumed leadership of a communications and devices division with more than 7,000 employees. In 2017, Evans was promoted to Chief Strategy Officer. In a Federal Trade Commission case against Qualcomm, Evans served as a witness alleging unfair business practices and potential anti-trust violations.

In February 2019, Evans joined Zoox as its new CEO. In doing so, she became the first Senegalese-American female CEO of an autonomous vehicle technology company. In June 2020, Evans led the acquisition of her company by Amazon for US$1.3 billion. A Forbes analysis suggests that Evans' decision to pursue aggressive patent coverage in the mobility space led to Amazon's interest. Evans will continue to manage the company as a stand-alone business post-acquisition.
