= Leo J. Ryan Memorial Park =

Recreational city park in Foster City, California

- West Lagoon view of Ryan Park.
- Interactive map of Leo J. Ryan Memorial Park
- Type: Recreational park
- Location: Foster City, California
- Coordinates: 37°33′31″N 122°16′18″W
- Area: 20.75 acres (8.40 ha)
- Created: Rededicated on November 13, 2005
- Operator: Foster City government
- Status: Open

Leo J. Ryan Memorial Park is a recreational city park, located in Foster City, California and run by the city government and local citizens. Originally called "Central Park", the park was renamed in 1979 in honor and memory of Congressman Leo J. Ryan, who was assassinated in 1978 in Guyana on orders from Jim Jones.

The park is situated on 20 acres (8 ha) which overlook Foster City's lagoon. The park houses the William E. Walker Recreation Center, and includes a waterfront, outdoor amphitheatre, sailboat tie-up facilities, boardwalk, lawn areas, and a gazebo on the lake. There is a pathway that goes around the perimeter of the park, which also has ADA access.

== Ryan 25th anniversary memorial service ==
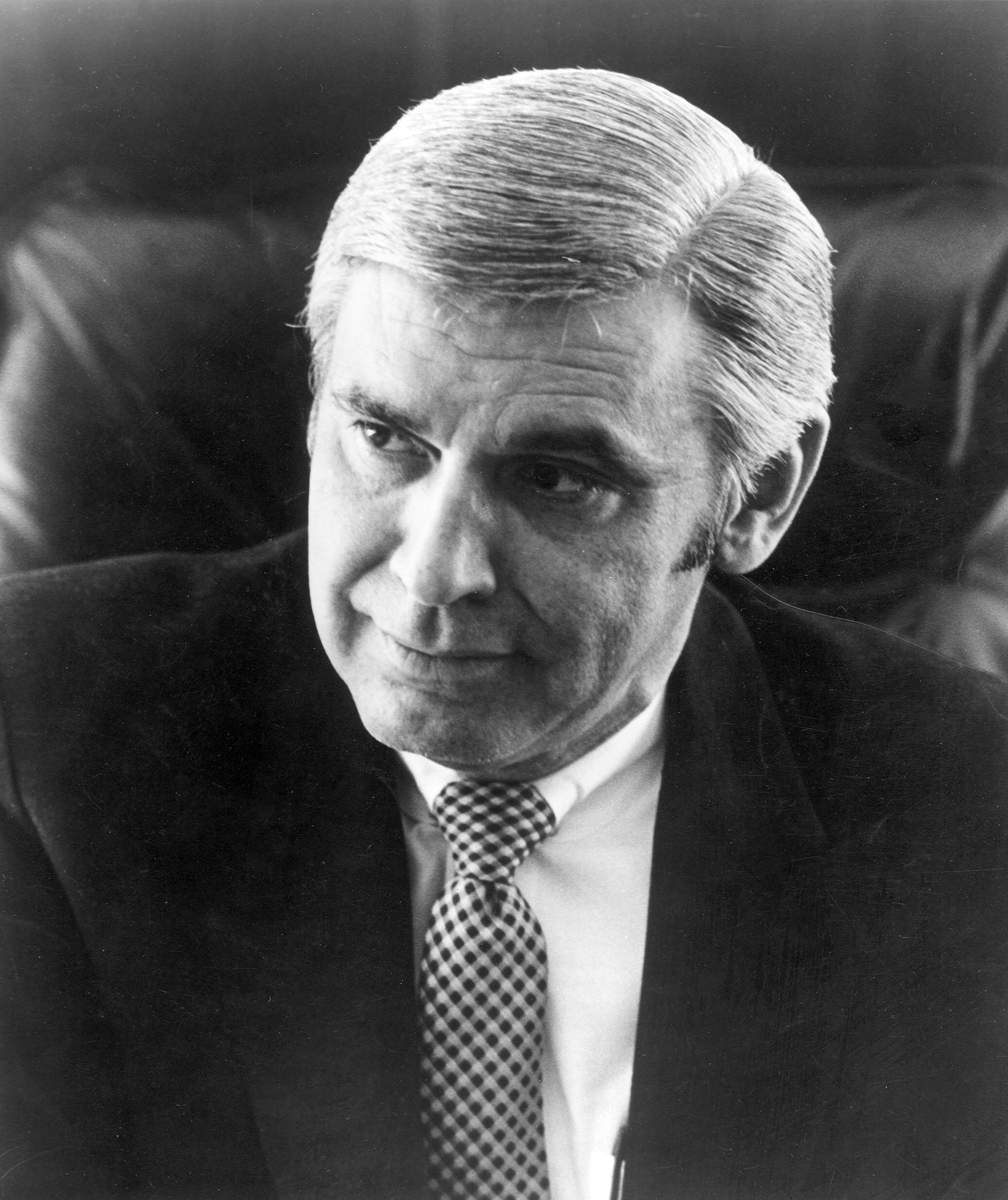
Congressman Leo J. Ryan

In 2003, on the 25th anniversary of his death, a special memorial tribute was held in Congressman Ryan's honor in Foster City, California. Ryan's family and friends including California State Senator Jackie Speier and Ryan's daughters were in attendance. The San Francisco Chronicle reported that "Over and over today, people described a great man who continually exceeded his constituents' expectations." Towards the end of the memorial service, parents of those who had died in Jonestown stood in honor of the congressman.

After the service had concluded, mounted police escorted the family and friends into Leo J. Ryan Memorial Park. A wreath was laid next to a commemorative rock that honored Ryan.

== 2005 rededication ==
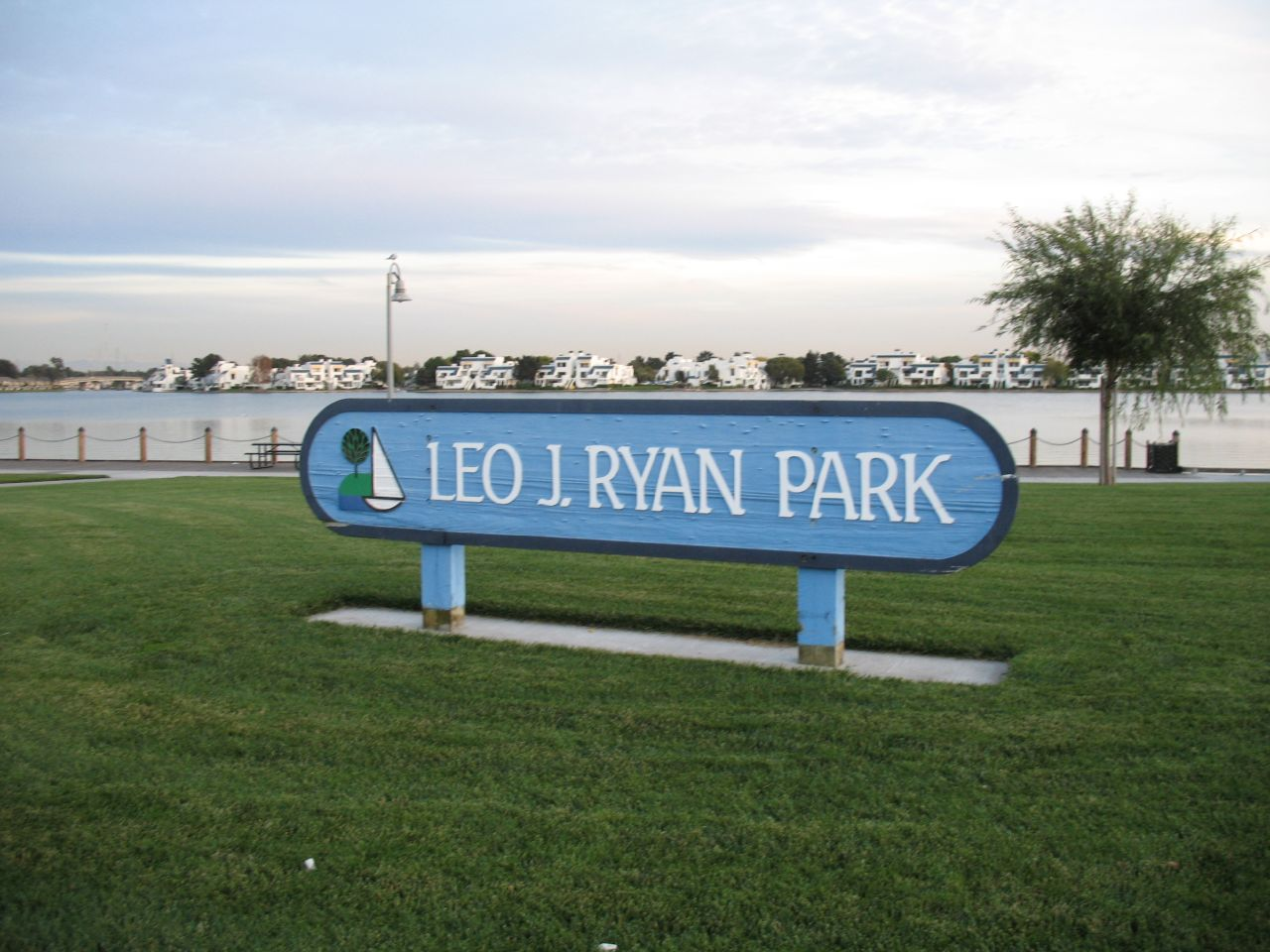
The sign in the park honoring Ryan

After a three-year construction project, the park was rededicated on November 13, 2005. Notable individuals in attendance included Congressman Ryan's two daughters, as well as Foster City council members and other members of government. Jackie Speier was also in attendance. Ryan's family stated: "Foster City's decision to name the park there after our dad really touched us ... They've done remarkable things with the park."

Phases I and II of the park's reconstruction included the relocation and construction of the amphitheater and repair and replacement of the boardwalk. Phase III included the Leo Ryan Memorial Plaza, the Leo Ryan Park Meadow area and installation of public art, the construction of two Bocce Ball courts and improvements to the City boat storage area.

== Recreation ==
From March to October annually, Leo J. Ryan Memorial Park hosts food trucks each evening behind the Recreation Center. Additionally, in the summer, concerts are held in the park's amphitheater on Friday evenings. Additionally, the park offers a plethora of water sports on the bordering lagoon, such as paddle boating and windsurfing.
