= Redwood Shores =

Community on San Francisco Bay, California

- District of Redwood City, California
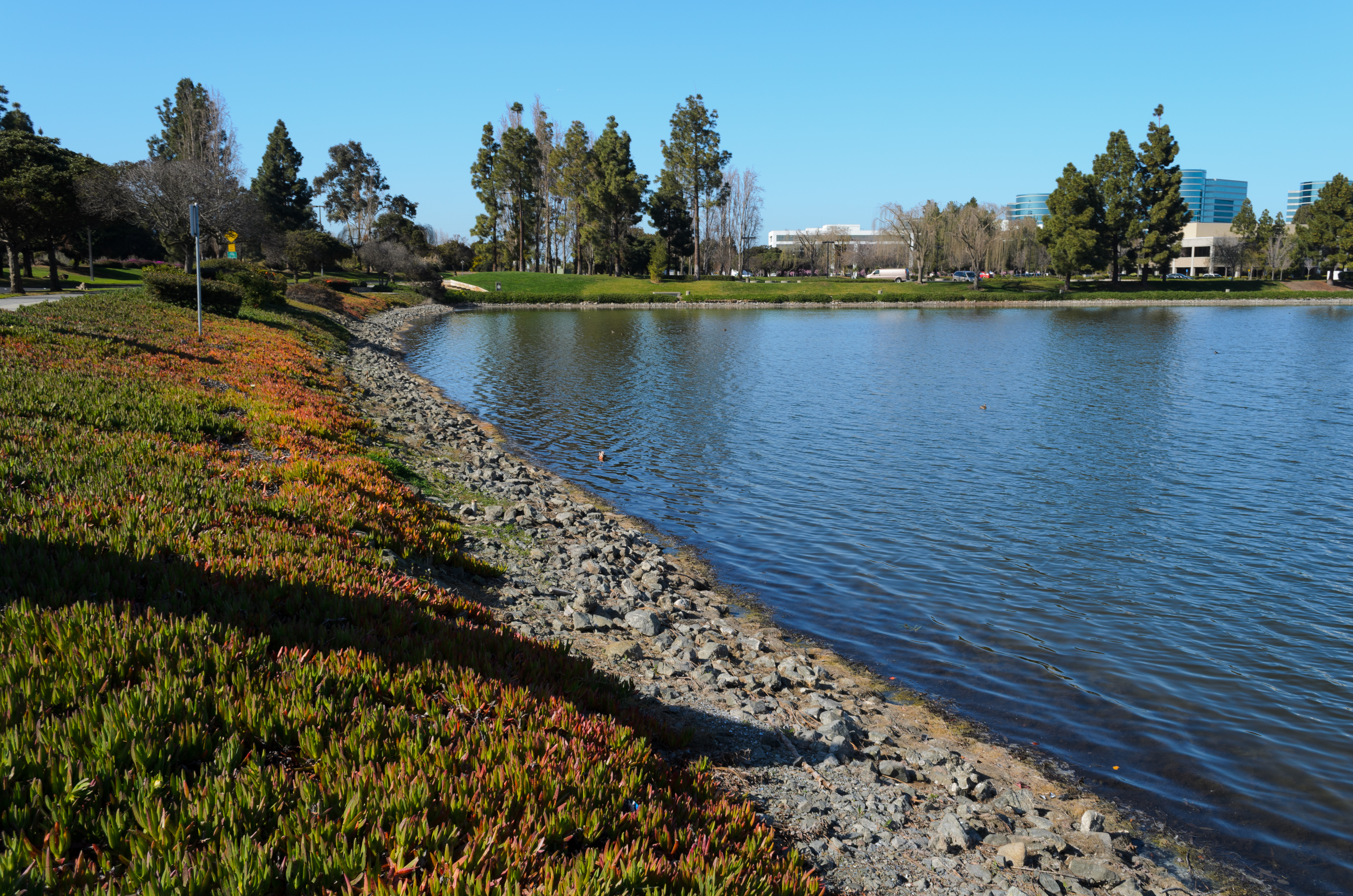
- Redwood Shores Lagoon, with the former Oracle headquarters visible in the background
- Motto: Climate Best By Government Test
- Location within San Francisco Bay Area
- Coordinates: 37°31′55″N 122°14′53″W
- Country: United States
- State: California
- County: San Mateo
- City: Redwood City
- Elevation: 7 ft (2.1 m)

Population
  - Total: 12,781
  - Density: 5,132/sq mi (1,981/km^{2})
- ZIP code: 94065
- Area code: 650

Redwood Shores is a waterfront community in Redwood City, California, along the western shore of San Francisco Bay on the San Francisco Peninsula in San Mateo County. Redwood Shores is the home of several major technology companies, including Oracle Corporation (which relocated its headquarters in 2020), Electronic Arts, Nintendo, Zuora, Qualys, Crystal Dynamics and Shutterfly.

== History ==
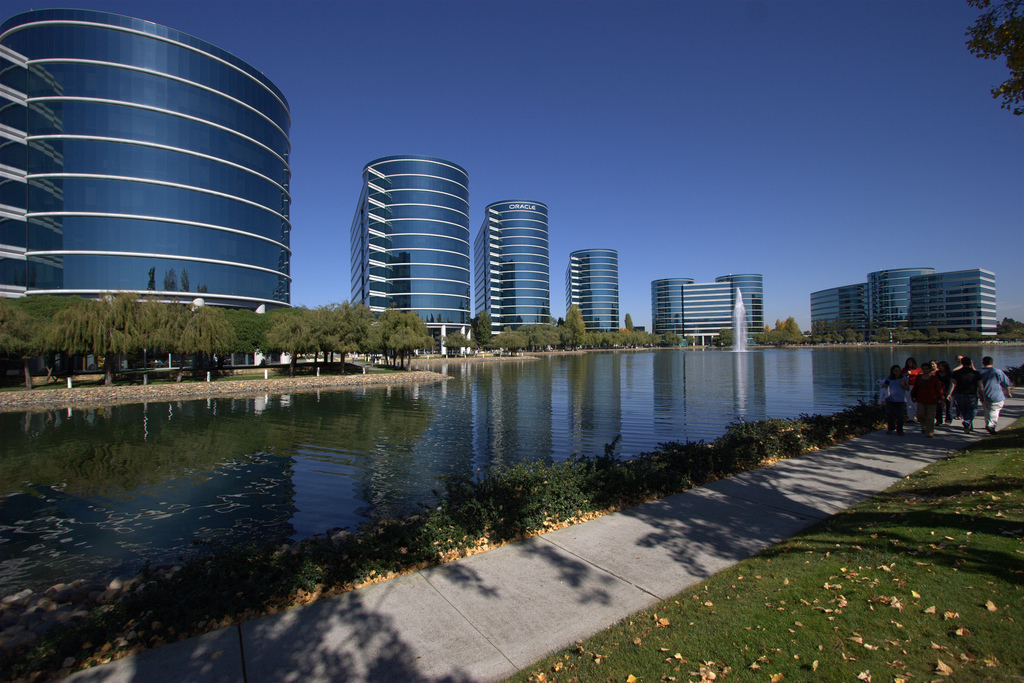
Former Oracle headquarters

Redwood Shores was built up from reclaimed land in the marshes of San Francisco Bay in the 1960s, much like its neighbor, Foster City, but the development almost never came to be. The owner of the land, the Leslie Salt Company, filled in soft ground known as "bay mud" formerly used for salt-evaporation ponds, but a significant controversy developed over fears of its susceptibility to serious earthquake damage because the area is between and close to the San Andreas Fault and Hayward Fault. The ensuing battle between various government agencies and business interests eventually made Leslie Salt lose interest in the project. As a result, Bank of America became the owner of the development in 1972.

It was the home of the Marine World/Africa U.S.A., California theme park from the 1960s to 1986, when the park moved to Vallejo, California (eventually becoming Six Flags Discovery Kingdom). The former location of Marine World has evolved into homes, townhomes, condominiums, apartments, parks, preserved land, and Silicon Valley business parks with headquarters including the former headquarters of Oracle Corporation. In December 2020, Oracle announced that it had relocated its corporate headquarters from Redwood Shores to Austin, Texas.

== Geography ==
Redwood Shores is located roughly halfway between San Francisco and San Jose, and is bordered by Belmont and San Carlos to the southwest. Foster City lies to the northwest and Bair Island to the southeast; both are separated from Redwood Shores by sloughs. To the northeast is San Francisco Bay.

=== Climate ===
Climate data for Redwood Shores, California
| Month | Jan | Feb | Mar | Apr | May | Jun | Jul | Aug | Sep | Oct | Nov | Dec | Year |
|---|---|---|---|---|---|---|---|---|---|---|---|---|---|
| Record high °F (°C) | 78 (26) | 80 (27) | 91 (33) | 97 (36) | 102 (39) | 109 (43) | 110 (43) | 105 (41) | 107 (42) | 104 (40) | 87 (31) | 76 (24) | 110 (43) |
| Mean daily maximum °F (°C) | 59.1 (15.1) | 62.7 (17.1) | 65.3 (18.5) | 69.8 (21.0) | 72.1 (22.3) | 75.3 (24.1) | 77.5 (25.3) | 78.4 (25.8) | 77.5 (25.3) | 74.2 (23.4) | 65.3 (18.5) | 58.6 (14.8) | 69.7 (20.9) |
| Mean daily minimum °F (°C) | 43.2 (6.2) | 45.9 (7.7) | 48.3 (9.1) | 50.6 (10.3) | 53.4 (11.9) | 56.9 (13.8) | 58.8 (14.9) | 59.2 (15.1) | 57.8 (14.3) | 53.7 (12.1) | 49.4 (9.7) | 42.6 (5.9) | 51.7 (10.9) |
| Record low °F (°C) | 16 (−9) | 25 (−4) | 29 (−2) | 33 (1) | 36 (2) | 39 (4) | 40 (4) | 43 (6) | 38 (3) | 33 (1) | 29 (−2) | 19 (−7) | 16 (−9) |
| Average precipitation inches (mm) | 3.80 (97) | 3.95 (100) | 2.98 (76) | 1.08 (27) | 0.47 (12) | 0.1 (2.5) | 0. (0) | 0.02 (0.51) | 0.12 (3.0) | 1.02 (26) | 2.33 (59) | 3.64 (92) | 19.51 (495.01) |
Source 1: "The Weather Channel
Source 2:

== Economy ==
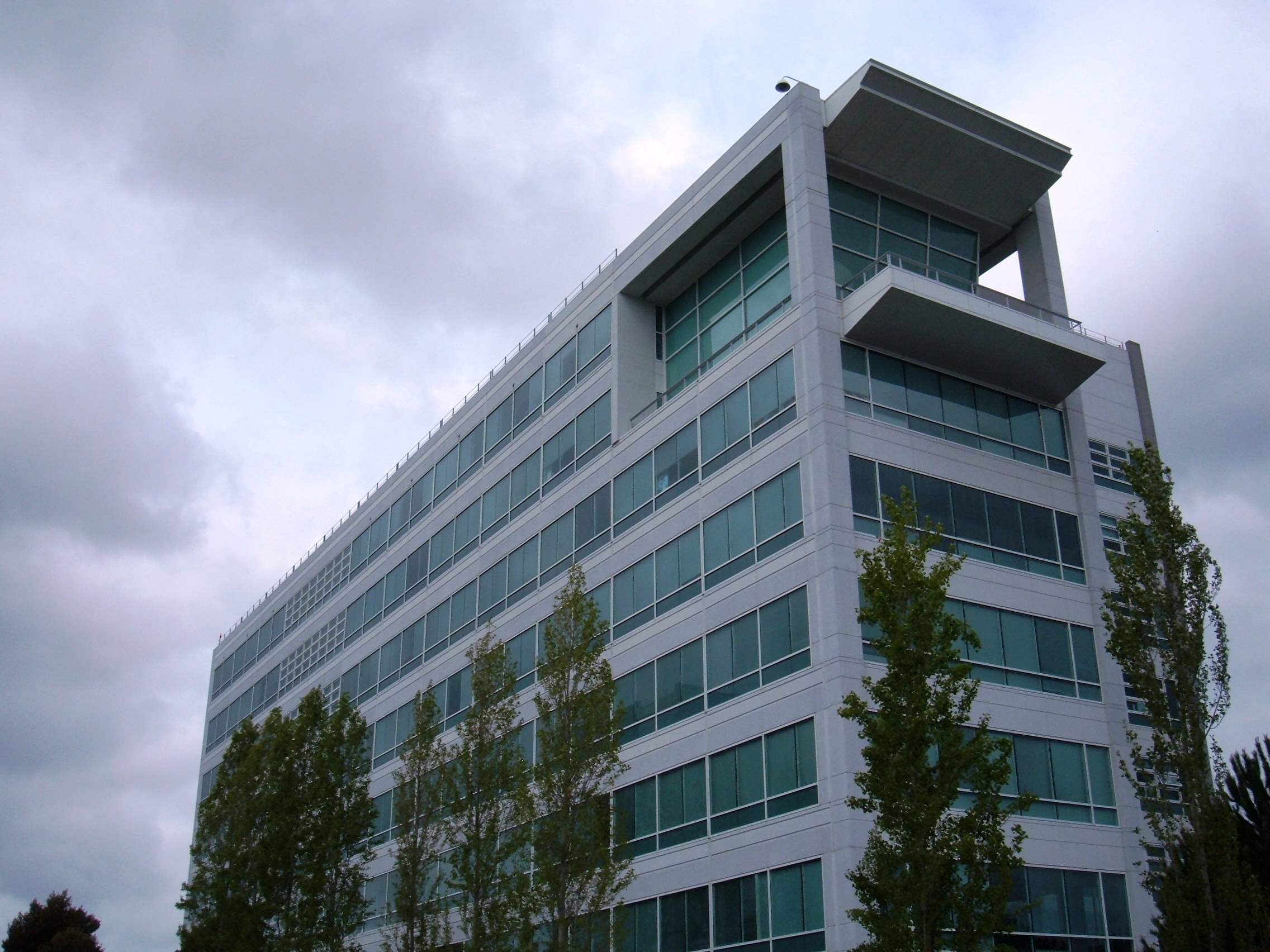
Electronic Arts headquarters

Major technology companies maintain headquarters in Redwood Shores, among them Imperva and Electronic Arts. The community also includes a branch of Ernst & Young, the West Coast office of Weil, Gotshal & Manges, and the headquarters of Relayware. For many years, Redwood Shores was the global headquarters of Oracle Corporation, until in December 2020 it announced its relocation to Austin, Texas.

== Infrastructure ==
The Redwood Shores Branch of the Redwood City Public Library serves the community. To the south Redwood Shores is bordered by the San Carlos Airport.

Redwood Shores is the setting for college rowing races, including competitions among Pac-12 Conference universities.

== Education ==
The community of Redwood Shores is served by the Belmont – Redwood Shores School District, which maintains the two schools located in Redwood Shores and five more schools in Belmont.

== Wildlife ==
Pacific harbor seals have occasionally been spotted in the waterways and lagoons around Redwood Shores. The areas in and around the community are home to a variety of wildlife, including raccoons, skunks, ducks, geese, egrets, great blue herons, clapper rails, harvest field mice, stingrays, jellyfish, and many other species. Canada geese pose a nuisance and the community is actively working on reducing their presence.
