= Foster City, California =

City in California, United States

- City
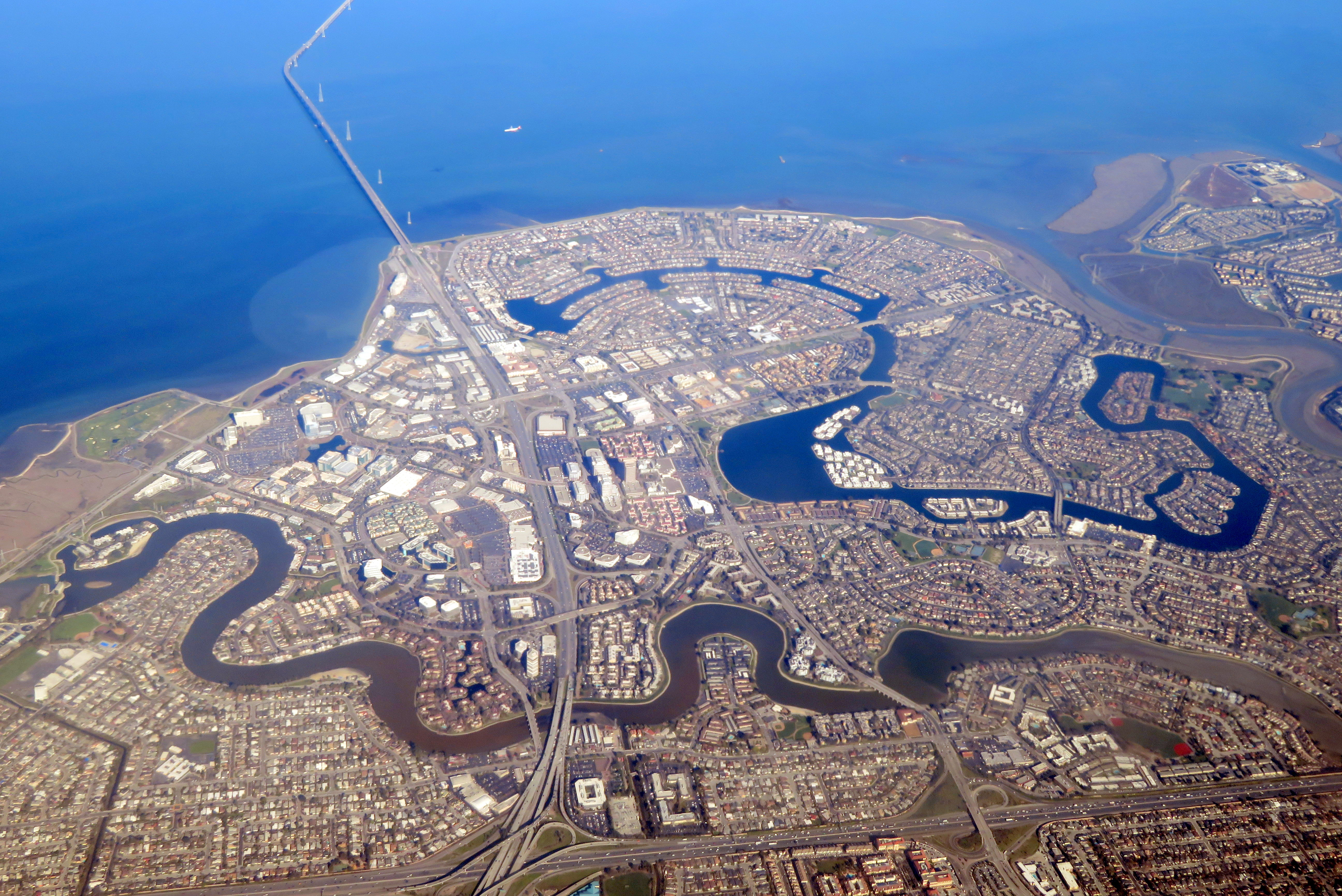
- Aerial view of Foster City and the San Mateo Bridge

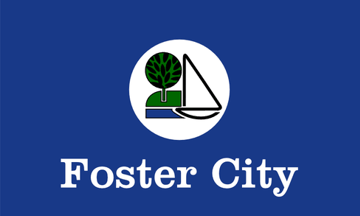
- Flag Seal
- Interactive map of Foster City, California
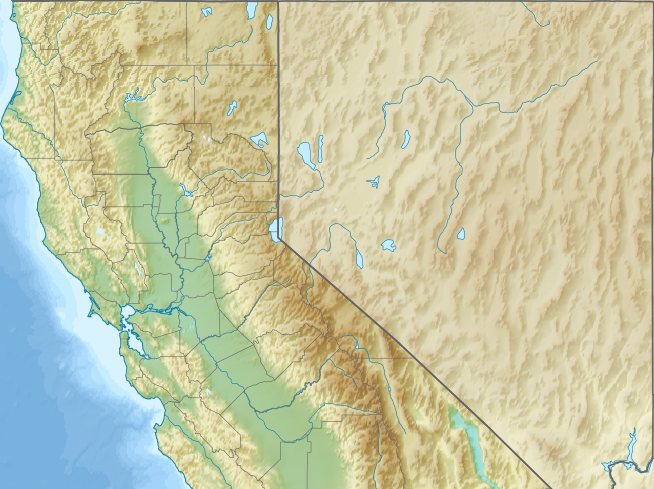
- Location in the United States Foster City (Northern California) Foster City (California) Foster City (the United States)
- Coordinates: 37°33′5″N 122°15′59″W
- Country: United States
- State: California
- County: San Mateo
- Incorporated: April 27, 1971
- Named for: T. Jack Foster, Foster Enterprises

Government
  - Mayor: Stacy Jimenez
  - City Manager: Stefan Chatwin

Area
  - Total: 19.83 sq mi (51.37 km^{2})
  - Land: 3.79 sq mi (9.81 km^{2})
  - Water: 16.05 sq mi (41.56 km^{2}) 80.90%
- Elevation: 6.6 ft (2 m)

Population (2020)
  - Total: 33,805
  - Density: 8,927/sq mi (3,446.6/km^{2})
- Time zone: UTC-8 (Pacific)
  - Summer (DST): UTC-7 (PDT)
- ZIP code: 94404
- Area code: 650
- FIPS code: 06-25338
- GNIS feature IDs: 1659723, 2410534
- Website: www.fostercity.org

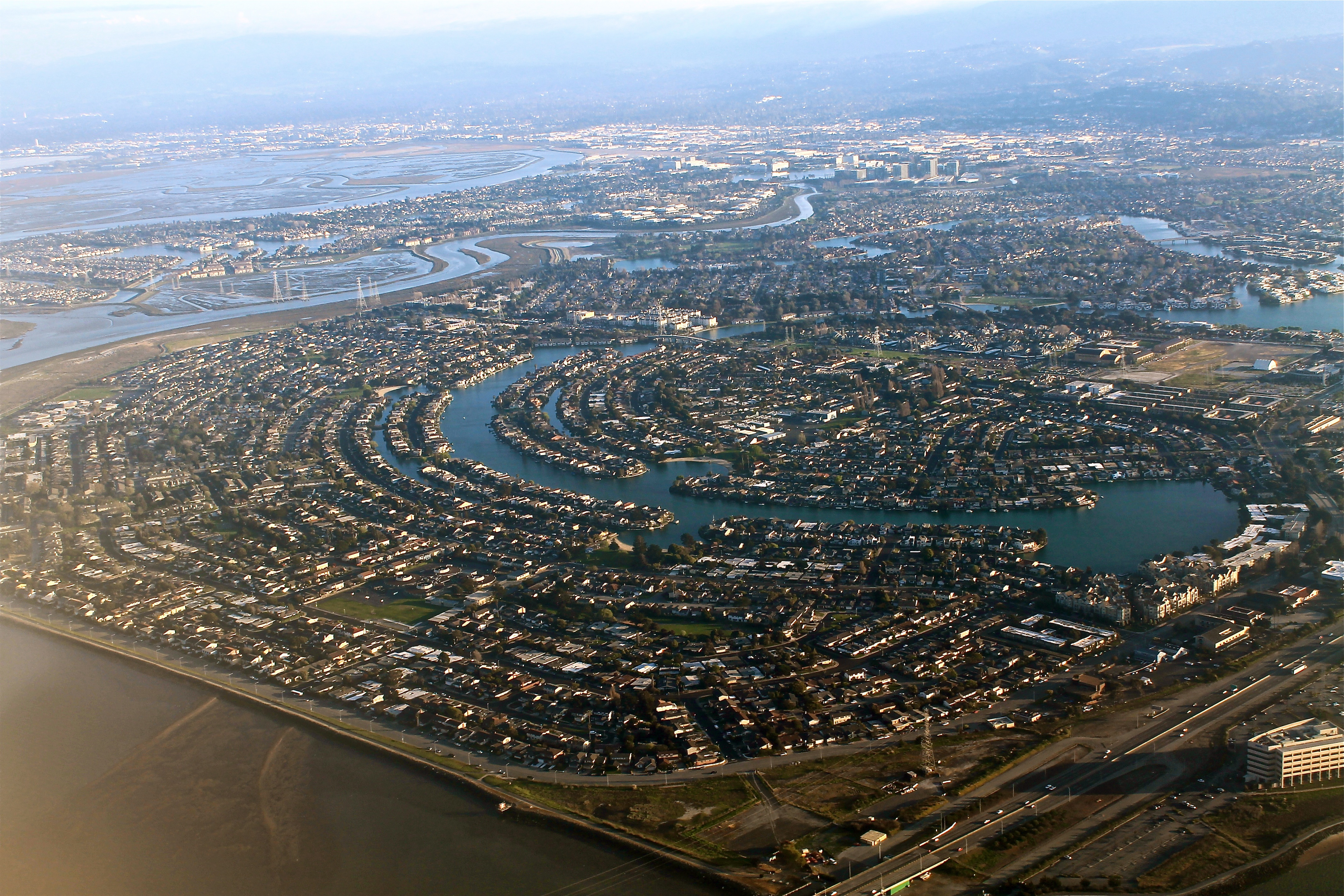
An aerial photograph of Foster City in 2013

Foster City is a master-planned city located in San Mateo County, California, United States. Foster City is sometimes considered to be part of Silicon Valley for its local industry and its proximity to Silicon Valley cities. There are many notable companies headquartered in Foster City, such as Gilead Sciences, Zoox, and Replit. Visa and Sledgehammer Games were formerly headquartered in Foster City.

The 2020 census put the population at 33,805, an increase of more than 10% over the 2010 census figure of 30,567.

Foster City contains at least 10 bridges of which seven cross its lagoon, two go across Highway 92 and one is the San Mateo-Hayward Bridge which crosses the San Francisco Bay.

Foster City is one of the United States’ safest cities, with an average of one murder per decade.

== History ==
Foster City was founded in the 1960s, built on the existing Brewer Island in the marshes of the San Francisco Bay on the east edge of San Mateo, enlarged with engineered landfill. The city was named after T. Jack Foster, a real estate magnate who owned much of the land comprising the city and who was instrumental in its initial design. His firm, Foster Enterprises, now run by his descendants, relocated to San Mateo in 2000 and is still active in real estate affairs throughout the San Francisco Bay Area.

The first residents moved into Foster City on March 7, 1964. Charles Zerbe, a San Francisco firefighter with a wife and two young sons, paid $23,500 for his four-bedroom house on Pilgrim Drive.

In the early 1960s, the first homes built in Foster City were sold for under $18,000. By the late 1960s, the average home price was just under $30,000. United States census data shows the median household income for Foster City residents in 1970 was $30,000 and in 1980 was $60,000. As of 2020, the median household income for Foster City was $161,000. In 2024, the average home value was $1,926,381.

== Geography ==
According to the United States Census Bureau, the city has a total area of 19.8 square miles (51 km^{2}), of which 3.8 square miles (9.8 km^{2}) is land and 16.0 square miles (41 km^{2}) is water. The total area is 80.90% water. Foster City has ongoing issues with water intrusion from the San Francisco Bay and is potentially subject to permanent inundation as the sea level rises. A project to improve the existing levee with a steel-reinforced wall has been underway since FEMA designated the entire area as a floodplain making residents subject to much higher flood insurance rates.

=== Climate ===
Foster City, like most of the Peninsula, has a mild warm-summer Mediterranean climate, with warm, dry summers and cool, wet winters. The warmest month of the year is September, with an average daytime temperature of 77.8 °F (25.4 °C) and an average nighttime temperature of 53.8 °F (12.1 °C), while the coldest month of the year is January, with an average daytime temperature of 58 °F (14 °C) and an average nighttime temperature of 41.5 °F (5.3 °C).

Climate data for Foster City, California
Month	Jan	Feb	Mar	Apr	May	Jun	Jul	Aug	Sep	Oct	Nov	Dec	Year
Record high °F (°C)	78 (26)	80 (27)	88 (31)	89 (32)	98 (37)	109 (43)	108 (42)	103 (39)	107 (42)	96 (36)	89 (32)	78 (26)	109 (43)
Mean daily maximum °F (°C)	58.0 (14.4)	61.5 (16.4)	63.9 (17.7)	67.0 (19.4)	70.5 (21.4)	74.4 (23.6)	76.7 (24.8)	76.6 (24.8)	77.8 (25.4)	73.0 (22.8)	65.4 (18.6)	59.0 (15.0)	68.7 (20.4)
Daily mean °F (°C)	49.7 (9.8)	52.7 (11.5)	54.5 (12.5)	57.0 (13.9)	60.2 (15.7)	63.5 (17.5)	65.2 (18.4)	65.4 (18.6)	65.8 (18.8)	62.1 (16.7)	55.7 (13.2)	50.8 (10.4)	58.5 (14.7)
Mean daily minimum °F (°C)	41.5 (5.3)	43.9 (6.6)	45.3 (7.4)	46.9 (8.3)	49.9 (9.9)	52.7 (11.5)	53.8 (12.1)	54.2 (12.3)	53.8 (12.1)	51.2 (10.7)	46.2 (7.9)	42.6 (5.9)	48.5 (9.2)
Record low °F (°C)	23 (−5)	29 (−2)	31 (−1)	31 (−1)	36 (2)	40 (4)	42 (6)	46 (8)	40 (4)	36 (2)	29 (−2)	25 (−4)	23 (−5)
Average precipitation inches (mm)	4.6 (120)	3.2 (81)	2.8 (71)	1.3 (33)	0.5 (13)	0.1 (2.5)	0 (0)	0 (0)	0.2 (5.1)	0.9 (23)	2.1 (53)	3.4 (86)	19.1 (490)
Average precipitation days	11	10	9	5	3	1	0	0	1	3	7	10	60

== Demographics ==
Historical population
Census	Pop.	Note	%±
1970	9,327		—
1980	23,287		149.7%
1990	28,176		21.0%
2000	28,803		2.2%
2010	30,567		6.1%
2020	33,805		10.6%
U.S. Decennial Census; 1860–1870 1880-1890; 1900 1910 1920; 1930 1940 1950; 1960 1970 1980; 1990 2000 2010

=== Racial and ethnic composition ===
Foster City city California – Racial and ethnic composition Note: the US Census treats Hispanic/Latino as an ethnic category. This table excludes Latinos from the racial categories and assigns them to a separate category. Hispanics/Latinos may be of any race.
Race / Ethnicity (NH = Non-Hispanic)	Pop 2000	Pop 2010	Pop 2020	% 2000	% 2010	% 2020
White alone (NH)	16,090	12,829	10,734	55.86%	41.97%	31.75%
Black or African American alone (NH)	595	545	479	2.07%	1.78%	1.42%
Native American or Alaska Native alone (NH)	29	17	31	0.10%	0.06%	0.09%
Asian alone (NH)	9,339	13,691	17,992	32.42%	44.79%	53.22%
Native Hawaiian or Pacific Islander alone (NH)	156	182	179	0.54%	0.60%	0.53%
Other race alone (NH)	69	102	258	0.24%	0.33%	0.76%
Mixed race or Multiracial (NH)	994	1,206	1,711	3.45%	3.95%	5.06%
Hispanic or Latino (any race)	1,531	1,995	2,421	5.32%	6.53%	7.16%
Total	28,803	30,567	33,805	100.00%	100.00%	100.00%

=== 2020 census ===
As of the 2020 census, Foster City had a population of 33,805. The median age was 39.5 years. 21.4% of residents were under the age of 18 and 17.3% of residents were 65 years of age or older. For every 100 females there were 96.6 males, and for every 100 females age 18 and over there were 93.6 males age 18 and over.

100.0% of residents lived in urban areas, while 0.0% lived in rural areas.

There were 12,892 households in Foster City, of which 35.9% had children under the age of 18 living in them. Of all households, 61.0% were married-couple households, 13.4% were households with a male householder and no spouse or partner present, and 21.1% were households with a female householder and no spouse or partner present. About 20.9% of all households were made up of individuals and 9.0% had someone living alone who was 65 years of age or older.

There were 13,558 housing units, of which 4.9% were vacant. The homeowner vacancy rate was 0.8% and the rental vacancy rate was 5.6%.

Racial composition as of the 2020 census
Race	Number	Percent
White	11,166	33.0%
Black or African American	514	1.5%
American Indian and Alaska Native	76	0.2%
Asian	18,074	53.5%
Native Hawaiian and Other Pacific Islander	196	0.6%
Some other race	973	2.9%
Two or more races	2,806	8.3%

=== 2020 estimates ===
The 2020 median home price in Foster City was $1,439,375. 52% of the population was born in the United States, and 22% of the population are naturalized citizens.

The Census reported that the median household income was $163,322, 3.2% of the population was below the poverty line, out of the total population 2.5% of those under the age of 18 and 5.1% of those 65 and older were living below the poverty line.

For those over the age of 25, 96% had a high school diploma or higher, 71% had a bachelor's degree, and 36.6% had a graduate degree or professional degree.

=== 2010 census ===
The 2010 United States census reported that Foster City had a population of 30,567. The 2009 median home price in Foster City was $1,025,000. The population density was 8,138.2 inhabitants per square mile (3,142.2/km^{2}). The racial makeup of Foster City was 13,912 (45.5%) White, 576 (1.9%) African American, 29 (0.1%) Native American, 13,746 (45.0%) Asian, 189 (0.6%) Pacific Islander, 575 (1.9%) from other races, and 1,540 (5.0%) from two or more races. Hispanic or Latino of any race were 1,995 persons (6.5%).

The Census reported that 30,458 people (99.6% of the population) lived in households, 52 (0.2%) lived in non-institutionalized group quarters, and 57 (0.2%) were institutionalized.

There were 12,016 households, out of which 4,256 (35.4%) had children under the age of 18 living in them, 7,127 (59.3%) were opposite-sex married couples living together, 963 (8.0%) had a female householder with no husband present, 316 (2.6%) had a male householder with no wife present. There were 531 (4.4%) unmarried opposite-sex partnerships, and 75 (0.6%) same-sex married couples or partnerships. 2,807 households (23.4%) were made up of individuals, and 860 (7.2%) had someone living alone who was 65 years of age or older. The average household size was 2.53. There were 8,406 families (70.0% of all households); the average family size was 3.04.

The population was spread out, with 6,913 people (22.6%) under the age of 18, 1,526 people (5.0%) aged 18 to 24, 9,801 people (32.1%) aged 25 to 44, 8,223 people (26.9%) aged 45 to 64, and 4,104 people (13.4%) who were 65 years of age or older. The median age was 39.3 years. For every 100 females, there were 93.5 males. For every 100 females age 18 and over, there were 91.0 males.

There were 12,458 housing units at an average density of 3,316.8 units per square mile (1,280.6 units/km^{2}), of which 6,958 (57.9%) were owner-occupied, and 5,058 (42.1%) were occupied by renters. The homeowner vacancy rate was 0.8%; the rental vacancy rate was 3.5%. 18,423 people (60.3% of the population) lived in owner-occupied housing units and 12,035 people (39.4%) lived in rental housing units.

== Economy ==
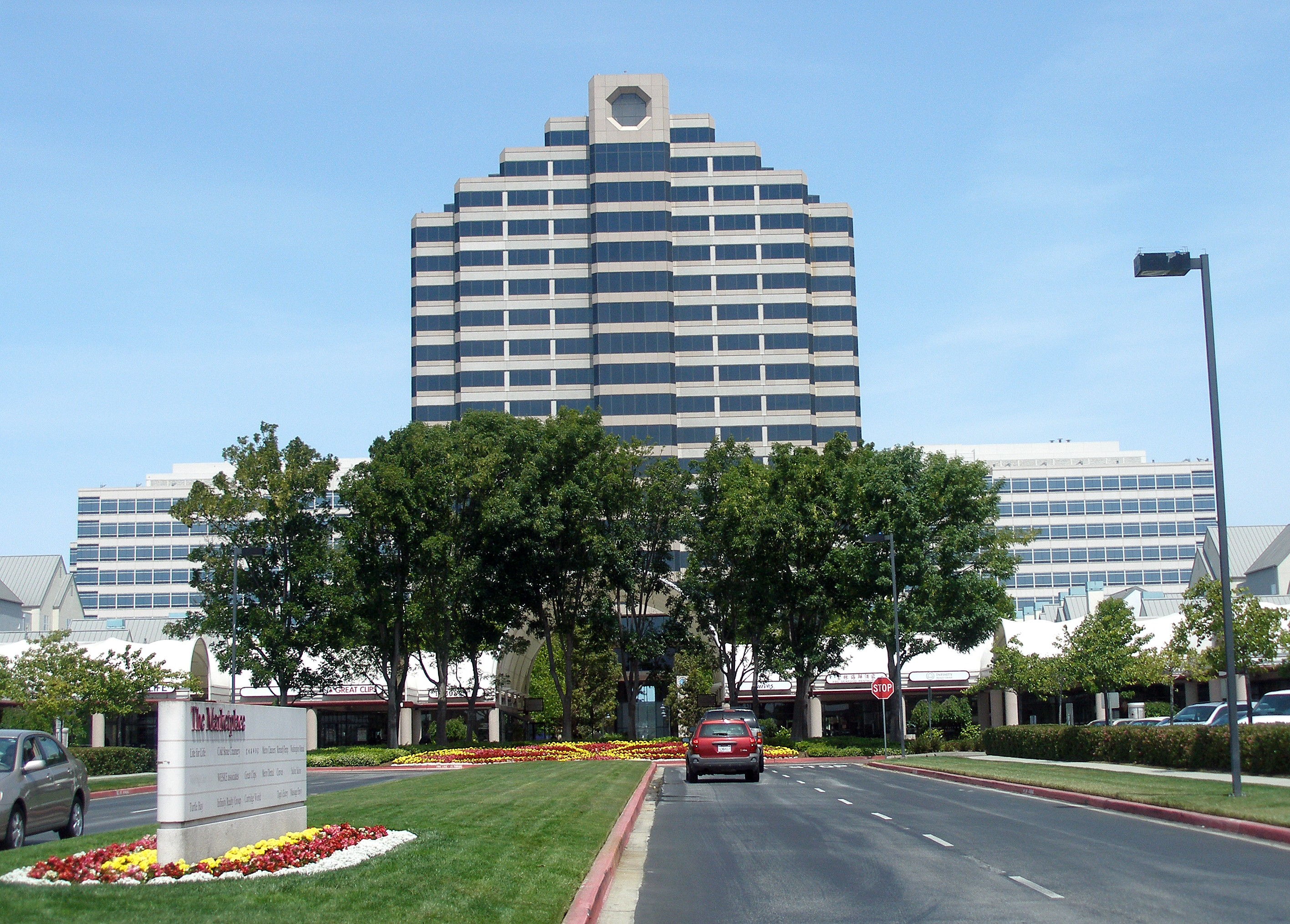
Metro Center, one of Foster City's largest retail/office complexes. The tall building is called the Metro Tower and is the tallest building in Foster City.

=== Headquarters ===
Around 1993 Visa Inc. began consolidating various scattered offices in San Mateo, California to a location in Foster City. Visa's headquarters were in Foster City, and Visa became Foster City's largest employer. Visa owns four buildings at the intersection of Metro Center Boulevard and Vintage Park Drive. As of 2009 it employed about 3,000 people at the complex. During that year Visa signed a 10-year lease agreement for the top three floors of 595 Market Street in San Francisco and moved its top executives there. Visa continued to keep employees at the Foster City offices. As of 2009, after the headquarters move, the Foster City facilities remained the company's center of employment, and those buildings housed 2,400 employees as of 2009.

Other companies with headquarters in Foster City:

- Applied Underwriters
- Conversica
- Conviva
- Electronics for Imaging
- Gilead Sciences
- Guidewire Software
- Imperva, Inc.
- Live365.com
- LiveRamp
- Navigenics
- Philips (manufacturing facility)
- QuinStreet Inc.
- Sledgehammer Games
- Sling Media
- Truviso
- Zuora
- Zoox

=== Top employers ===
According to the city's 2023 Top Ten Employers, the top ten employers in the city are:

#	Employer	# of Employees	% of Total City Employment
1	Gilead Sciences	6,714	33.15%
2	Visa	2,879	14.22%
3	Zoox	1401	6.92%
4	Inovant LLC (Visa Technology and Operations LLC)	1,054	5.20%
5	CyberSource	427	2.11%
6	Peninsula Jewish Community Center	417	2.06%
7	Sledgehammer Games	321	1.58%
8	Costco Wholesale	290	1.43%
9	Qualys	283	1.40%
10	MinPen Housing Corporation	270	1.33%

== Arts and culture ==
- The city is served by the Peninsula Library System.
- The historic Hillbarn Theatre was founded in 1940 and provides the community with year-round access to live theatre, as well as workshop, classes, and summer camps for kids ages 6 to 18.

== Parks and recreation ==
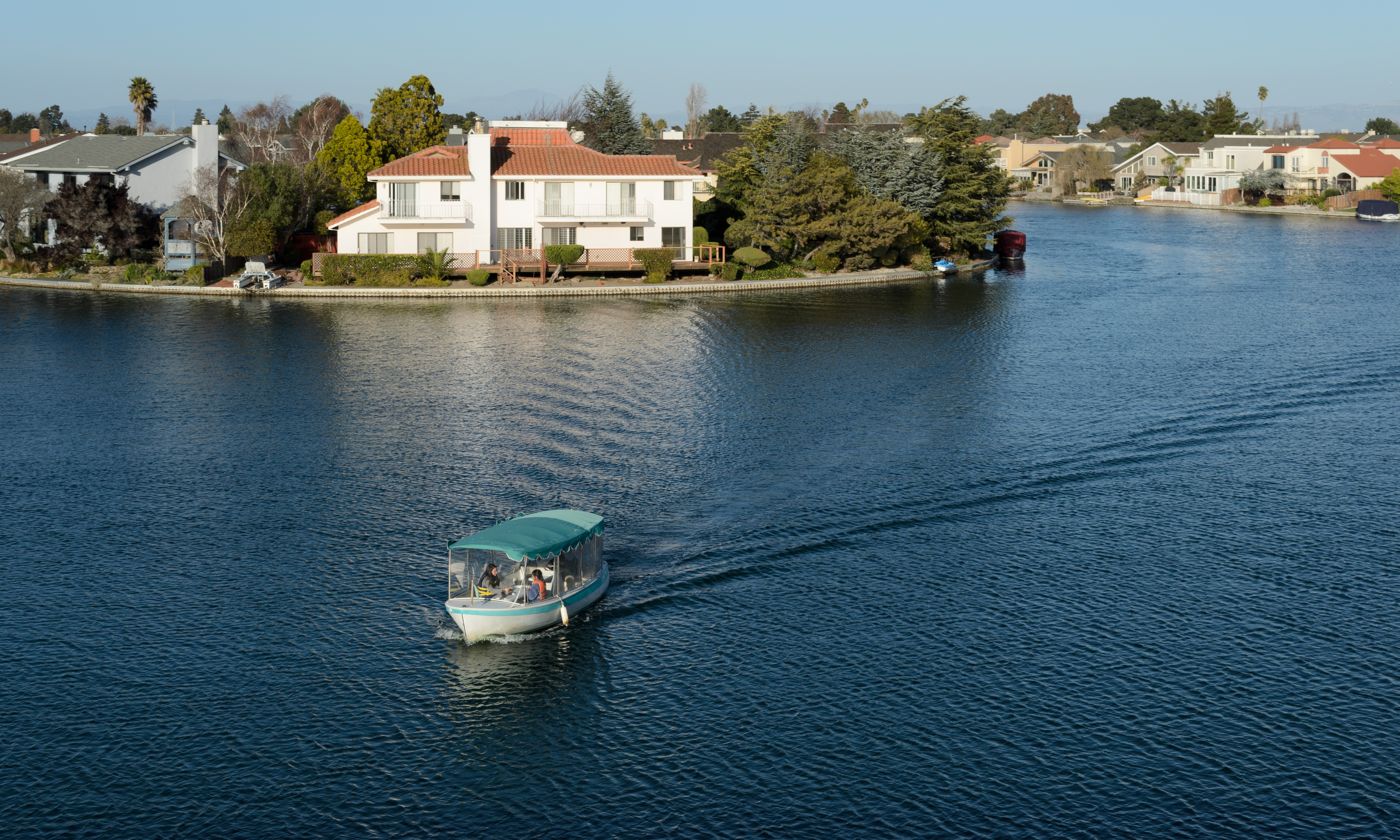
Boating is a popular activity in the city's lagoons.

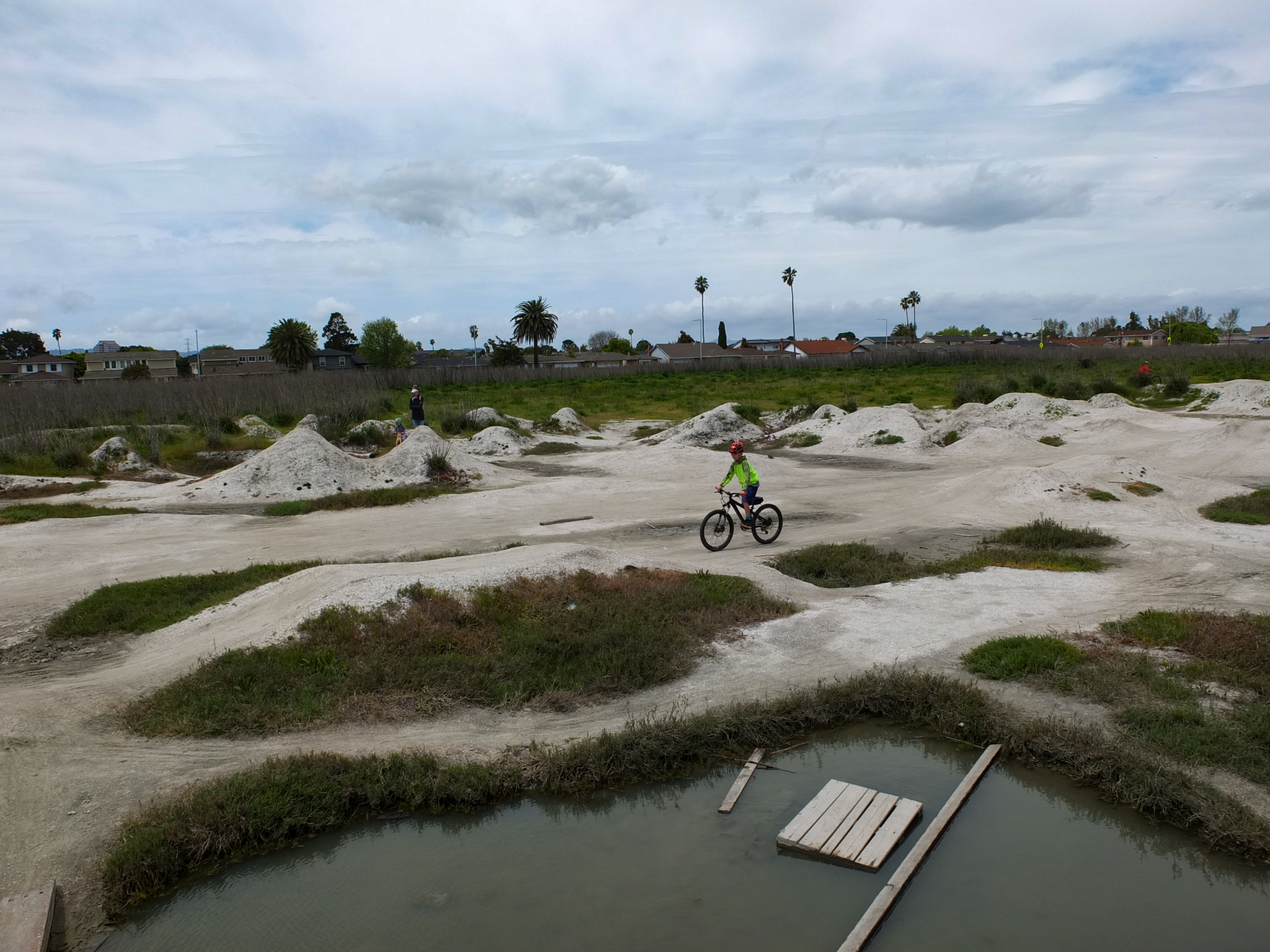
Shells Dirt Jumps at the Beach Park

Foster City has 24 parks occupying more than 200 acres (0.8 km^{2}), including many public tennis courts, baseball and soccer fields, basketball courts, and rollerblading/biking trails along the San Francisco Bay.

Foster City also has:

- Windsurfing and Kite-Surfing A windsurfing and kite-surfing spot in the San Francisco Bay can be found within the city limits of Foster City. It is located adjacent to Mariners Point.
- A Golf course and driving range There is one 9-hole golf course, and driving range Mariners' Point, on land owned by the city, and operated by VB Golf.
- Dragon Boating The Bay Area Dragons and Ho'okahi Pu'uwai outrigger canoe clubs operate in the lagoon. In an attempt to preserve the city's waterways and reduce noise levels, only electric, wind, or man-powered watercraft are permitted in the Lagoon.
- Teen Activities Center A newly constructed $4 million center for teens that will provide access to: TV's, computers, video games, art rooms, homework rooms, a kitchen and outdoor basketball courts. The center is also known as "The Vibe" and has a concrete skatepark adjacent to it.
- Public Amphitheatre Located in Leo J. Ryan Memorial Park, is a newly constructed Amphitheatre. It serves as the location for the Foster City Summer concerts. Adjacent to the park is a boardwalk with boat tie-up facilities.

In addition, Foster City maintains an extensive 218-acre (0.9 km^{2}), man-made enclosed lagoon system. The lagoons were initially designed as a drainage system required in order to efficiently drain the lowland city.

== Government ==
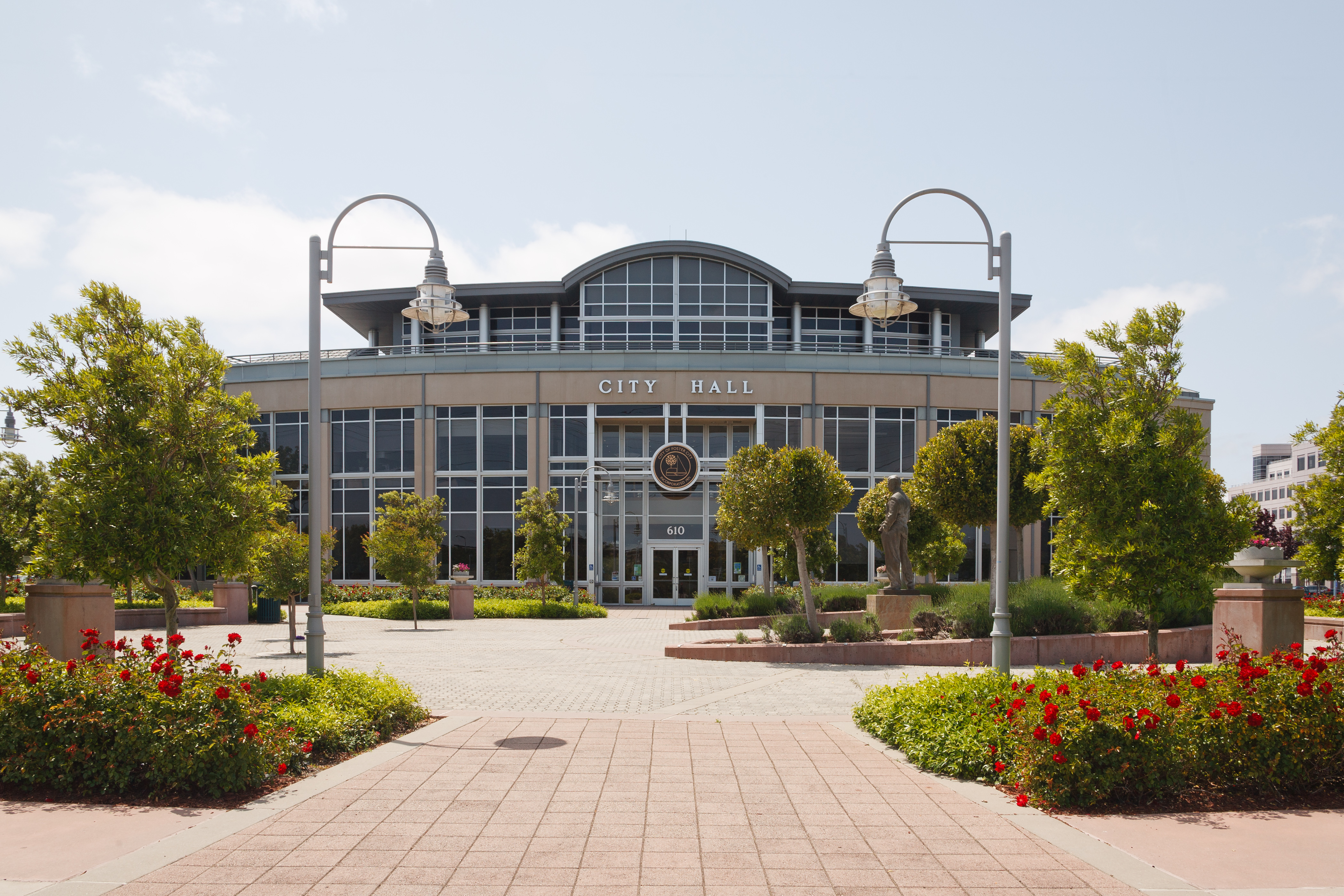
City Hall of Foster City

In the California State Legislature, Foster City is in the 13th senatorial district, represented by Democrat Josh Becker, and in the 21st Assembly district, represented by Democrat Diane Papan.

In the United States House of Representatives, Foster City is in California's 15th congressional district, represented by Democrat Kevin Mullin.

As of December 2024, Foster City's Mayor is Stacy Jimenez. Other councilmembers include Art Kiesel, Suzy Niederhofer, Patrick Sullivan, and Phoebe Venkat.

Former Mayor Sam Hindi was the first Palestinian-American Mayor in the history of California. Former Mayor Sanjay Gehani was the first Mayor for Foster City of Indian descent. Former Mayor Richa Awasthi was the first female minority and female immigrant Mayor for Foster City. In 2020, former Mayor Herb Perez was recalled by a majority (77.28%) of Foster City voters. Perez was the first city councilperson to be recalled since 1977.

According to the California Secretary of State, as of February 10, 2019, Foster City has 16,568 registered voters. Of those, 7,336 (44.3%) are registered Democrats, 2,756 (16.6%) are registered Republicans, and 5,977 (36.1%) have declined to state a political party.

== Education ==
Foster City is home to five public schools in the San Mateo–Foster City Elementary School District. Foster City Elementary School (which has recently been remodeled), Brewer Island Elementary School, Audubon Elementary School, and newly built Beach Park Elementary School serve kindergarten through fifth grades. Nathaniel Bowditch Middle School serves 6th through 8th grades. There are several private preschools and elementary schools. There is a separate High School District: San Mateo Union High School District. There is no high school located east of Highway 101 so Foster City high school students attend the public schools in the San Mateo Union High School District and other private high schools in the San Francisco Bay Area.

Four public schools in Foster City (Audubon School, Brewer Island School, Foster City School, and Bowditch Middle School) have won California Distinguished School awards. In 1993, Bowditch was recognized with the U.S. Department of Education Blue Ribbon. In 2005, Bowditch became a California Distinguished School for the second time. A third recognition was given in 2013.

Foster City has one private Jewish day school: Ronald C. Wornick Jewish Day School is a kindergarten – eighth grade school. It was rated the number one Jewish day school in the South Bay/Peninsula.

Foster City also has one private elementary school: Kids Connection is a kindergarten – fifth grade school.

== Items of interest ==
Foster City's Werder Pier is a remainder of the original expanse of the San Mateo–Hayward Bridge. It is also one of the longest and oldest piers in California. Unfortunately, due to much needed repair, the once popular fishing pier is no longer in operation.

A number of San Francisco professional athletes have called Foster City home. Former San Francisco Giants players Kevin Mitchell and Jeff Kent won the National League Most Valuable Player award while they were residents of Foster City.

Peter Thiel, the libertarian-authoritarian political activist and founder of PayPal, was raised in Foster City.

Norman Hsu, the Hong Kong-born convicted criminal (Ponzi scheme scam artist) and political activist, is a former resident of Foster City.

The movie Over the Edge is based on events occurring in Foster City and chronicled in a 1973 article titled "Mousepacks: Kids on a Crime Spree" in the San Francisco Examiner.

Foster City TV broadcasts a variety of programs related to the operation of and life in Foster City. Foster City TV provides programming through a dedicated government-access television (GATV) channel.

== See also ==
- Foster City Marina
- Leo J. Ryan Memorial Park
