= CMA =

CMA may stand for:

== Accounting ==
- Certified Management Accountant
- Cost And Management Accountant (India)
- Chartered market analyst, designation of the American Academy of Financial Management
- Comparative market analysis, in real estate
- Institute of Certified Management Accountants of Sri Lanka or CMA Sri Lanka

== Associations ==
- California Medical Association, US
- Canadian Malayalee Association
- Canadian Medical Association
- Canadian Motorcycle Association
- Canadian Museums Association
- Catholic Medical Association
- Chess'n Math Association
- China Meteorological Administration
- Chinese Musicians' Association
- Chinese Muslim Association, a religious organization in Taiwan
- Christian Ministers' Association
- Christian and Missionary Alliance
- Christian Motorcyclists Association
- Community Media Association
- Constitutional Monarchy Association, a formation of the International Monarchist League
- Coordination of Azawad Movements
- Country Music Association
- Council of Magickal Arts
- Crystal Meth Anonymous
- Cumberland Miners' Association

== Colleges and schools ==
- Camden Military Academy, South Carolina, US
- Columbia Military Academy, Tennessee, US
- California State University Maritime Academy, Vallejo, California, US

== Government ==
- Capital Markets Authority of Kenya
- Capital Market Authority (Saudi Arabia)
- Capital Market Authority (United Arab Emirates)
- Capital Markets Authority of Uganda
- Catchment Management Authority (disambiguation), Australia
- Census metropolitan area, a Canadian census area
- Chennai Metropolitan Area, India
- China Meteorological Administration
- Common Monetary Area
- Competition and Markets Authority, a regulatory body in the United Kingdom
- Computer Misuse Act 1990
- Council for Multicultural Australia, former name of the Australian Multicultural Council
- U.S. Army Chemical Materials Activity

== Science ==
=== Biology ===
- Chaperone-mediated autophagy

=== Chemistry ===
- Calcium magnesium acetate, an inorganic compound
- Chloromethamphetamine
- Complex metallic alloys

=== Other science ===
- Canis Major, astronomical constellation abbreviation "CMa"
- CMA (AAMA), a certified medical assistant in the US
- Covariance Matrix Adaptation Evolution Strategy (CMA-ES)
- Critical medical anthropology

== Transportation ==
- Central Mountain Air, an airline based in Smithers, British Columbia, Canada
- Compagnie des Messageries Aériennes, a French airline
- Compañía Mexicana de Aviación, a Mexican airline
- Cunnamulla Airport (IATA airport code CMA), Queensland, Australia
- Camarillo Airport (FAA lid code CMA), California, USA
- CMA CGM
- Compact Modular Architecture platform, a modular car platform developed by Geely
- Congestion management agency, a type of county-level agency in California

== Other uses ==
- Calculated Match Average, motorcycle speedway handicap
- CMA (AAMA), medical assistant credential
- Clearwater Marine Aquarium, Florida
- Cleveland Museum of Art, Ohio, United States
- Columbus Museum of Art, Ohio, United States
- Country Music Association Awards (CMA Awards or CMAs)
- Cumbria, ceremonial county in England
- Ćma, 1980 Polish film, The Moth in English
- Koho language (ISO 639 language code cma)
- IOC sport code for canoe marathon at the Summer Olympics

== See also ==
- CMAS (disambiguation)
