= San Mateo County Transportation Authority =

Transportation planning agency

San Mateo County Transportation Authority (SMCTA)
Agency overview
- Formed: 1988
- Jurisdiction: San Mateo County
- Website: http://www.smcta.com

The San Mateo County Transportation Authority (SMCTA) is a transportation planning and programming agency for San Mateo County that was created following the 1988 passage of Measure A, a voter-approved half-cent sales tax for countywide transportation projects. The Authority plans, funds and delivers transportation programs and projects throughout San Mateo County. SMCTA is a separate legal entity from the SamTrans. It is governed by an appointed board of seven directors, who are elected officials, representing the county, cities, and SamTrans. SMCTA has invested approximately $2 billion in transportation infrastructure projects in San Mateo County since it was created in 1988.

== See also ==
- Alameda County Transportation Commission
- Metropolitan Transportation Commission
- Santa Clara Valley Transportation Authority
- San Francisco County Transportation Authority
- San Mateo County Transit District
