= Conservation Volunteers Australia =

Australian conservation organization

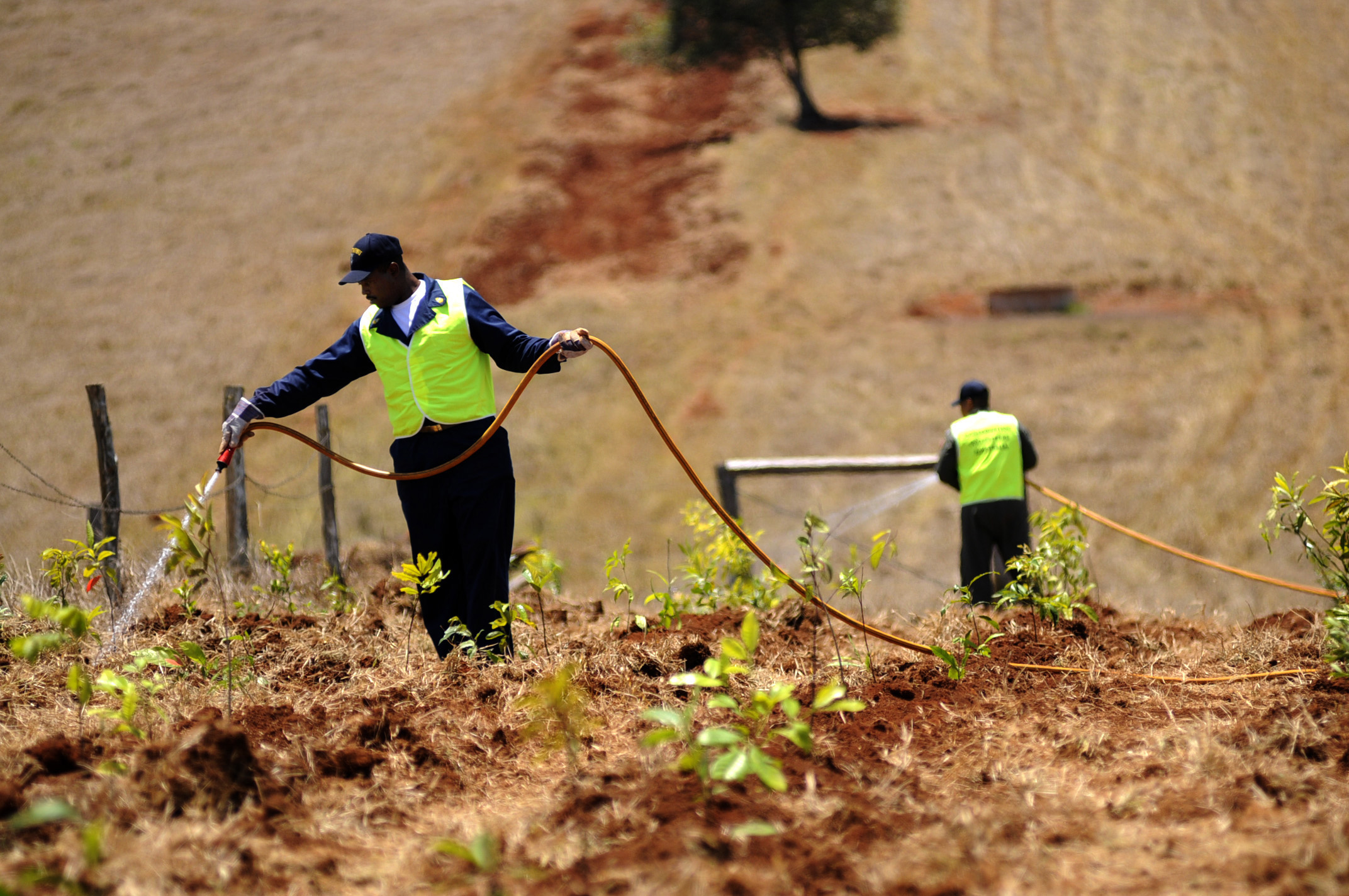
A community project involving sailors from the USS Blue Ridge near Cairns, 2009

Conservation Volunteers Australia is an Australian not-for-profit conservation organisation that attracts and co-ordinates volunteers for environmental restoration projects.

== History ==
The organisation was founded in Ballarat, Victoria in 1982 as the Australian Trust for Conservation Volunteers. The organisation's Head Office remains in Ballarat, and Conservation Volunteers now has 25 offices around Australia.

=== Timeline ===
- 1982 – organisation founded as Australian Trust for Conservation Volunteers
- 1999 – Leading partner in forming the international Conservation Volunteers Alliance
- 2000 – New name and logo launched as organisation becomes Conservation Volunteers Australia (CVA)
- 2000 – Admitted to United Nations Global 500 Honour Roll for Environmental Achievement – one of only 14 organisations from 12 countries recognised for the year
- 2001 – Launch of Revive Our Wetlands, a 10-year partnership between Conservation Volunteers Australia and BHP Billiton to deliver Australia's largest national wetlands revival program
- 2001 – Launch of Shell Coastal Volunteers, a community business partnership between Conservation Volunteers Australia and Shell Australia
- 2002 – CVA wins Prime Minister's Award for Excellence in Community Business Partnerships for Revive Our Wetlands program with BHP Billiton
- 2006 – Launch of Conservation Volunteers New Zealand with an office in Auckland
- 2009 – CVA wins the National Ecotourism Award from Ecotourism Australia
- 2011 – CVA is presented with the United Nations World Tourism Organisation / UNWTO Ulysses Award for Innovation in Non-Governmental Organizations for the project 'Connecting People with the Environment, W James Whyte Island Reserve: tourists volunteering to protect biodiversity – Conservation Volunteers (Australia)'
- 2014 – CVA wins Victorian Tourism Award – New Tourism Development for Naturewise Eco Escapes in partnership with Parks Victoria

== Projects ==
All Conservation Volunteers projects involve practical conservation, with activities typically including tree planting, weed control, seed collection, track and trail building and maintenance, heritage restoration projects, and wildlife surveys. Volunteers operate in teams of up to 10, under guidance and instruction of a professional CV Team Leader.

With the majority of CVA's offices located in regional Australia, a major focus of the organisation's work involves assisting individual landholders, Landcare groups and Catchment Management Authorities involved in land management programs; councils and shires; and all major National Parks agencies.

== Volunteers ==
Conservation Volunteers attracts over 10,000 local volunteers per year in Australia and New Zealand, plus over 2,000 international volunteers every year.

=== Youth programs ===
* Green Army In 2014, the Australian Government engaged Conservation Volunteers Australia as one of five Service Providers to deliver services as part of the Green Army Programme. CVA was appointed for a period of three years, 2014–2017, to deliver the Green Army Programme. The Green Army is a hands-on, practical, grassroots environmental action programme that supports local environment and heritage conservation projects across Australia. The programme provides opportunities for young Australians aged 17–24 years to gain training and experience in environmental and heritage conservation fields and explore careers in conservation management, while participating in projects that generate real benefits for the environment.

Green Army teams of 10 (up to nine participants and one team supervisor) will be deployed to projects lasting 20–26 weeks across Australia to help communities deliver local conservation outcomes. Projects are guided by local community needs and contribute to Australia's national and international environmental priorities and obligations.

* National Green Jobs Corps The National Green Jobs Corps (NGJC) was an Australian Government work experience and training program that offers a combination of environmental work experience, skill development and accredited training for youth aged 17 to 24 years. The program will equip an estimated 10,000 young Australians with the skills to fill employment opportunities in emerging green and climate change-related industries. CVA is managing National Green Jobs Corps programs in Queensland, New South Wales, the Australian Capital Territory and Tasmania.

* Green Corps Conservation Volunteers Australia (known then as the Australian Trust for Conservation Volunteers) was the lead proponent with the Australian Government in establishing and delivering the Green Corps program. Green Corps was designed to provide young Australians between 17–20 years with the opportunity to demonstrate their commitment to the environment by contributing to high priority conservation projects while being provided with quality training and work experience throughout a 6-month program. Between 1997 and 2003, CVA was contracted to deliver 5,240 places across Australia.

* South Australian Youth Conservation Corps (SAYCC) The South Australian Youth Conservation Corps (YCC) was an initiative of the South Australian Government and was delivered by Conservation Volunteers Australia (CVA) from 2003. Designed for young people (aged 16 to 24-year) YCC offered career opportunities through accredited training and work experience.

=== Corporate volunteering ===
In addition to providing financial support for projects, many of CVA's corporate partners have developed staff volunteer programs with the organisation.

=== Volunteer interpreter program ===
Tidbinbilla Nature Reserve, part of Parks Conservation and Lands (PCL) within the Department of Territory and Municipal Services (ACT Government), and Conservation Volunteers have formed a partnership to deliver visitor management and interpretation services using volunteers. The five-year partnership was established in 2007 and Conservation Volunteers now employ full-time staff based at Tidbinbilla Nature Reserve to manage the volunteer interpreter program and the visitor centre on behalf of PCL. Volunteers complete a formal training program facilitated by environmental and interpretation experts, plus ongoing professional development. The ACT National Parks Association was critical of the handover to a volunteer organisation, accusing the state government or neglecting its responsibilities.

== Corporate partnerships ==
Conservation Volunteers has many partnerships with Australian businesses. CVA has been able to develop a broad range of partnerships with corporate Australia for conservation projects which could not take place without corporate support. Each partnership is tailored to ensure it meets the needs of CVA, the company and the environment, and includes elements such as program funding, payroll giving, corporate volunteering, and staff fundraising for conservation.

== Land management ==
=== The W. James Whyte Island Reserve – "The Island" ===
In 2006, Conservation Volunteers Australia received a significant donation of a block of degraded land which CVA is transforming into a conservation reserve through volunteer efforts. The W.James Whyte Island Reserve is located just outside Bacchus Marsh in Victoria. To date, more than a quarter of a million trees have been planted at the reserve. Extensive weed control has also taken place.

=== Little Desert Nature Lodge ===
In 2011, Conservation Volunteers Australia became the new owner and manager of Little Desert Nature Lodge (www.littledesertlodge.com.au), near Nhill in Victoria.

=== Salvana Conservation Reserve ===
In 2013, Conservation Volunteers Australia was able to secure the long-term future of Lemon Springs and Middlegate blocks in the Little Desert Region of Western Victoria. These properties are adjacent to the Little Desert National Park and close to the Little Desert Nature Lodge, owned by CVA. The purchase of the property was made possible via a bequest from The State Trustees who managed the Estate of the late Victor Salvana. In recognition of this generous donation the property will be known as the Salvana Conservation Reserve.

=== Brookfield Conservation Park ===
Brookfield Conservation Park is a National Parks & Wildlife park managed by Conservation Volunteers Australia in partnership with the Department for Environment & Water. It is situated in the Riverland region of South Australia, in typical Mallee country. It is home to both flora and fauna threatened species. CVA undertakes a range of volunteer activities both in the park and in the surrounding area, with a focus on research of threatened species, including the southern hairy-nosed wombat and their habitat. Baseline data collection is one of the main priorities.

== See also ==
- Conservation in Australia
