= CMAS =

CMAS may stand for:

- CMAS (gene), the human enzyme cytidine monophosphate N-acetylneuraminic acid synthetase
- Center for Mexican American Studies, an academic research center at University of Texas at Arlington
- Commercial Mobile Alert System (now called Wireless Emergency Alerts), a system for distributing geo-targeted alerts to mobile devices
- Confédération Mondiale des Activités Subaquatiques, the international umbrella organization for underwater sports and recreational diving
  - CMAS* scuba diver and CMAS** scuba diver, diving certifications
- Coordination des Mouvements, Associations et Sympathisants, founded by Mahmoud Dicko

== See also ==
- CMA (disambiguation)
