= SamTrans =

Public transit operator in San Mateo County, California

San Mateo County Transit District (SamTrans)

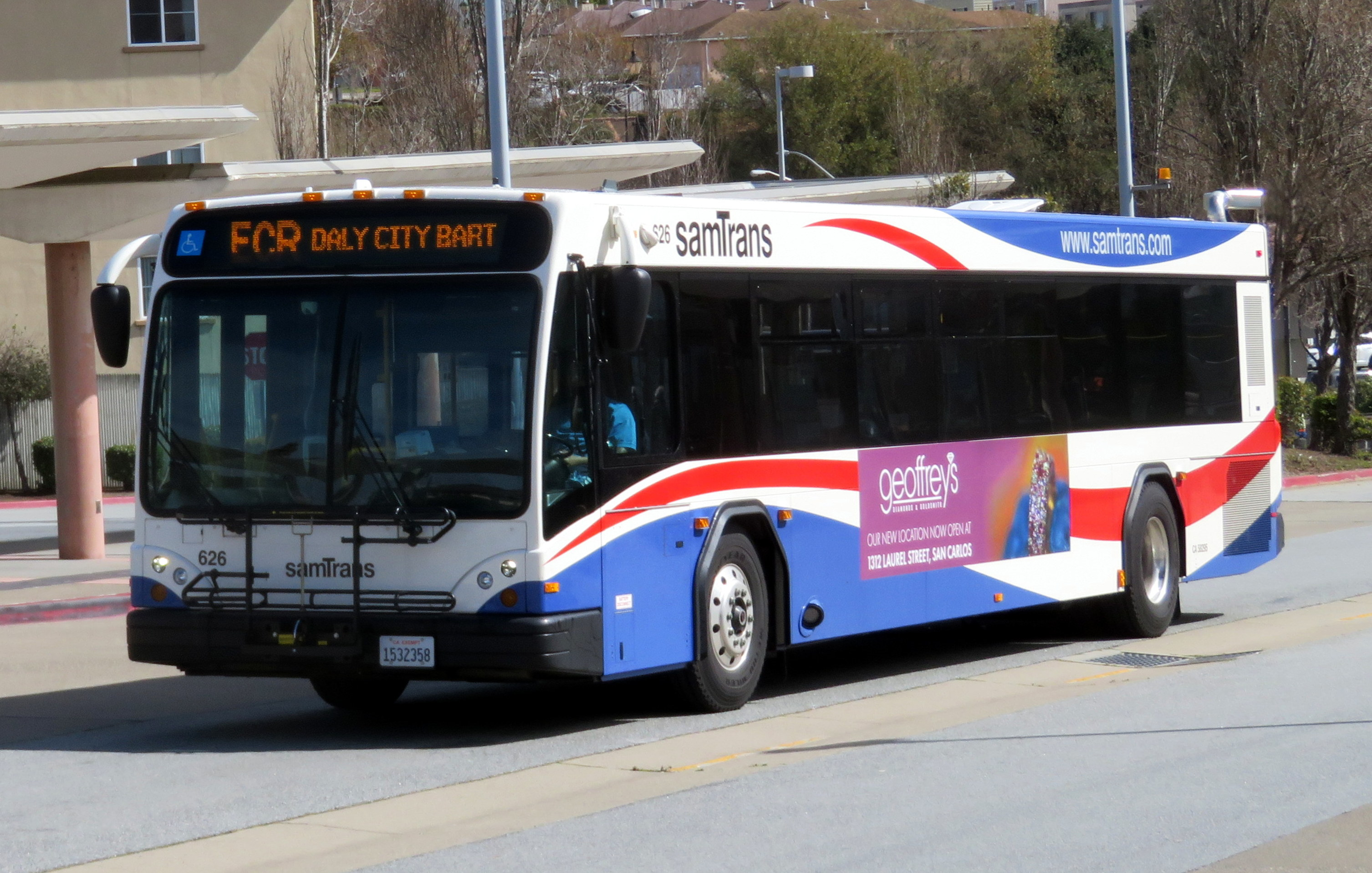
- Parent: San Mateo County Transit District
- Founded: July 1, 1976
- Headquarters: 1250 San Carlos Ave. San Carlos, California
- Locale: San Francisco Peninsula
- Service area: San Mateo County
- Service type: bus service, express bus, paratransit
- Routes: 66
- Fleet: 296
- Daily ridership: 35,200 (weekdays, Q3 2025)
- Annual ridership: 10,706,300 (2024)
- Operator: SamTrans (most fixed-routes); MV Transportation (certain fixed-routes and shuttles); Trans Dev (paratransit)
- Website: samtrans.com

SamTrans (stylized as samTrans; officially the San Mateo County Transit District) is a public transport agency in and around San Mateo, California, in the San Francisco Bay Area. It provides bus service throughout San Mateo County and into portions of San Francisco (a consolidated city-county) and into portions of Palo Alto and Stanford in Santa Clara County. SamTrans also operates commuter shuttles to BART stations and community shuttles. Service is largely concentrated on the east side of the Santa Cruz Mountains, and, in the central county, I-280, leaving coast-side service south of Pacifica spotty and intermittent.

SamTrans is constituted as a special district under California state law. It is governed by a board of nine appointed members; two county Supervisors, one "transportation expert" appointed by the county Board of Supervisors, three city council members appointed by the cities in the county to represent the county's judicial districts, and three citizens appointed by the other six board members (including one from the coastside).

The district was established in 1976 and consolidated eleven different municipal bus systems serving the county. One year later, SamTrans began operation of mainline bus service to San Francisco. Shuttle service began in 2000.

In addition to fixed-route bus and paratransit operations, the district participates in the administration of the San Jose-San Francisco commuter rail line Caltrain. SamTrans also provides administrative support for the San Mateo County Transportation Authority, a separate board charged with administering the half-cent (0.5 percent) sales tax levy that funds highway and transit improvement projects.

In 2024, the system had a ridership of 10,706,300, or about 35,200 per weekday as of the third quarter of 2025.

== History ==
SamTrans annual statistics
Year	Finances (Note: Fiscal year ends on June 30. Reported in Year of Expenditure $×1,000.)			Annual Ridership (Note: Cumulative annual ridership over the fiscal year, in thousands)
Year	Passenger Fare Revenue	Operating Expenses	Farebox recovery ratio (Note: For fixed routes only.) (Note: Starting in FY 1996, insurance premiums and loss payments are included as expense credits.)	Passengers
1995	12,094	52,155	26.3%	19,363
1996	13,749	53,930	27.9%	18,895
1997	14,217	55,187	27.7%	18,455
1998	14,388	58,647	27.3%	18,991
1999	15,896	57,770	30.9%	17,886
2000	15,196	64,911	27.1%	17,675
2001	15,919	71,914	30.0% (25.7%) (Note: Revised farebox recovery ratio (FRR) reported in FY 2006)	17,958
2002	14,779	81,995	28.1% (20.9%)	17,103
2003	15,273	91,560	44.4% (22.4%)	16,121
2004	14,542	94,164	52.8% (20.3%)	14,710
2005	13,863	94,118	55.6% (17.9%)	14,190
2006	16,296	103,692	19.3% (19.0%) (Note: Revised FRR reported in FY 2007)	14,691
2007	16,830	109,329	19.4% (18.8%) (Note: Revised FRR reported in FY 2008)	14,351
2008	17,203	118,756	18.1%	15,362
2009	17,325	116,563	17.5%	15,549
2010	17,149	112,406	18.2%	14,422
2011	17,373	111,128	18.0%	13,692
2012	17,452	115,269	17.3%	13,118
2013	17,808	114,151	18.2%	12,997
2014	18,557	116,513	18.7% (20.4%) (Note: Revised FRR reported in FY 2015)	12,784
2015	18,816	120,210	18.1%	13,159
2016	18,078	118,099	16.6%	12,794
2017	17,041	124,979	15.4%	11,817
2018	15,742	131,899	11.9%	11,133
2019	15,567	147,782	10.7%	10,671
2020	11,690	160,648	7.3%	8,788
2021	5,615	146,246	3.8%	4,581
2022	8,913	128,838	6.0%	6,957
Notes

Initial logo (before 1980)

Voters in San Mateo County approved the formation of the San Mateo County Transit District in 1974. SamTrans was formed in 1976 by the consolidation of 11 different city bus systems throughout San Mateo County; several more systems were added over the following years. SamTrans took over Western Greyhound Lines commuter service on July 2, 1977; some routes were curtailed from downtown San Francisco to Daly City station. SamTrans purchased 40 buses from Greyhound at that time, and its fleet exceeded 200 buses by 1980.

In August 2013, the agency merged two routes along El Camino Real into the single all-day ECR route with 15-minute headways, briefly stemming a long-term decline in bus ridership that began in the early 1990s. Ridership on SamTrans buses was 52,140 passengers per weekday in November 2009; by November 2017, it had fallen to 37,830 bus passengers per weekday and continues to decline, further threatening the agency's budget. According to a route-level analysis, in 2014, four lines accounted for more than half of all weekday riders: ECR, 120, 292, and 122/28, with ECR alone accounting for more than one quarter of all weekday riders. A half-cent sales tax, Measure W, which partially goes to SamTrans, passed on the November 2018 ballot.

== Facilities ==
SamTrans headquarters are at 1250 San Carlos Avenue in a 125,000-square-foot (11,600 m^{2}) building built in 1979 and acquired in 1990, one block southwest of the San Carlos Caltrain station. In 2023, SamTrans authorized the acquisition of a new building near Millbrae BART and Caltrain station to be used as the new headquarter.

SamTrans has two maintenance bases. North Base opened in 1988. It is in South San Francisco, just north of San Francisco International Airport and adjacent to U.S. 101 and I-380. South Base opened in 1984 near the San Carlos Airport, east of U.S. 101 off Redwood Shores Parkway. Primary maintenance is carried out at North Base, which can store 200 buses. South Base can store 150 buses. SamTrans also owns Brewster Depot in Redwood City, which is used by its subcontractor MV Transportation for storage and dispatching; Brewster Depot is 3,000 square feet (280 m^{2}) and was built in 1940.

== Bus service ==
Currently, SamTrans serves the cities of San Mateo County, including Atherton, Belmont, Brisbane, Burlingame, Colma, Daly City, East Palo Alto, Foster City, Half Moon Bay, Hillsborough, Menlo Park, Millbrae, Pacifica, Palo Alto, Redwood City, Redwood Shores, San Bruno, San Carlos, San Mateo, and South San Francisco. Most routes provide connecting service to BART, Caltrain, or both. There is also regular scheduled service to San Francisco International Airport (SFO) and Transbay Terminal in downtown San Francisco.

Unlike most large transit operators in the Bay Area, SamTrans outsources to private contractors the operation of a number of its routes. The current contract operator for Peninsula mainline, Coastside and paratransit services is MV Transportation.

SamTrans previously operated special service for a couple of Bay Area events such as San Francisco 49ers home football games and the quirky Bay to Breakers footrace in San Francisco.

=== Route designations ===
samTrans route numbering scheme (Note: One exception is for Route ECR, which designates the line that replaced Routes 390 and 391, operating along El Camino Real between Daly City and Palo Alto.) (Note: Another exception is for Route FLX, a circulator route in Pacifica.) (Note: Another exception is for Route SFO, a loop route between Millbrae Intermodal Station and San Francisco International Airport.)
2		9			2	
Transit connections		Areas served / Express sequence			Sequence number / Express	
—	"Community route", no inter-agency connection (Note: In general, express routes do connect with other Bay Area transit agencies, including BART, Caltrain, Muni, AC Transit, and VTA, despite the lack of the third-digit designator.)	A	Sequential alphabetic designator for express route (Note: For example, the first express route was AX, followed by BX, CX, DX, etc.)		X	Designates express service
1	Connects to BART	1	Coastside		0	Sequential number assigned to numbered routes
2	Connects to Caltrain	2	North County	Colma / Daly City		
3	Connects to BART and Caltrain	3	North County	Brisbane / South San Francisco		
		4	North County	San Bruno / Millbrae / Burlingame		
		5	Mid County	San Mateo / Foster City / Redwood Shores		
		6	Mid County	Belmont / San Carlos		
		7	Mid County	Redwood City		
		8	South County	Menlo Park / East Palo Alto / Palo Alto		
		9	Multi-city service			

Notes

SamTrans reorganized its bus routes in August 1999 and adopted a new route designation system to identify service types, geographical coverage, and connections to rail services.

=== Routes ===
Local routes have either two or three digits or a special designation (e.g., ECR). For three-digit routes, the first digit identifies a rail connection:

- 1 – Connection to BART stations only (primarily routes in Daly City, Colma, South San Francisco and San Bruno)
- 2 – Connection to Caltrain stations only (primarily routes south of Millbrae) (Route 292, with service between San Francisco and San Mateo, only began connecting to BART at Millbrae in 2022; since it originally served Caltrain stations but no BART stations, its first digit is 2.)
- 3 – Connection to both BART and Caltrain stations (ECR, previously designated 390 and 391, provides service between Palo Alto and Daly City, 397 provides overnight service between San Francisco and Palo Alto as a part of the All Nighter network, and ECR OWL, previously designated 399, provides overnight service between Daly City and San Francisco International Airport as a part of the All Nighter network.)

All two-digit routes are community service routes. Most of these routes do not connect with rail and operate only on school days.

==== Express routes ====
Express bus routes are designated by two letters followed by X; previously, just one letter preceded the X. In December 2009, six express routes (DX, FX, MX, NX, PX, and RX) were eliminated due to high budget constraints; a seventh express route, Route CX, was redesignated Route 118, and then replaced by route PCX in 2024. In August 2018, express route, KX, was folded into Route 398, which was replaced by new express route EPX in February 2024. Express route FCX, between Foster City and San Francisco, debuted in August 2019

In April 2017, SamTrans identified fifteen potential express bus routes connecting the Peninsula counties of San Francisco, San Mateo, and Santa Clara. Most of the potential routes ran along U.S. 101, and some were planned to take advantage of managed lanes to provide speedier service. By June 2018, the list of potential bus routes was reduced to eight. The draft final report was released in November 2018, and the Board adopted it in December. SamTrans relaunched express bus service in August 2019 from Foster City to downtown San Francisco along U.S. 101, followed by a second route in Spring/Summer of 2020 from Palo Alto to western San Francisco along I-280. The Foster City–San Francisco route was launched as FCX in August 2019, but ridership and frequency have been adversely impacted by the COVID-19 pandemic in the San Francisco Bay Area. The launch of the other proposed express route planned for Phase 1, PAX (Palo Alto to western San Francisco), has been delayed indefinitely and there is currently no exact or estimated date for it to begin operation. Phase 2 of the express bus plan includes two additional routes: EPX (East Palo Alto to San Bruno) and an un-named route (San Mateo to downtown San Francisco); EPX was launched in 2023 after SamTrans completed acquisition of XE40 battery-electric buses.

=== Fares ===
Since January 1, 2020

Fare category		Cash/ (Note: No change cards provided after April 1, 2020.) Mobile (Note: Purchases made using the samTrans mobile app for smartphones.)	Clipper	Transfers (Note: For riders who hold a single-ride local fare, within two hours of purchase, when purchased using Clipper or samTrans mobile app.) (Note: Transfers for riders who have purchased express fare to local service are free, when purchased using samTrans mobile app.) & Reciprocity (Note: For holders of samTrans local monthly passes, AC Transit/Dumbarton Express 31-day tickets, Caltrain 2-zone monthly passes, or VTA monthly passes)	Day pass	Monthly pass
Adult (Note: Ages 19–64)	Local	$2.25	$2.05	–	$4.50	$65.60
Adult	Express (Note: Fare for express routes, such as FCX.)	$4.50	$4.00	$1.95 (Note: $2.25 for holders of local day passes.)		$130
Youth (Note: Ages 6–18) & Eligible Discount (Note: Eligible discounts apply to riders who are Senior (Ages 65+), Disabled, or Medicare cardholder)	Local	$1.10	$1.00	–	$2.00	$27
Youth & Eligible Discount	Express	$2.25	$2.00	$1.00		

Notes

As of December 22, 2010, Clipper card fare machines became fully operational throughout the system, allowing riders to pay fares using Clipper card, a transit smart card that is also accepted by most other Bay Area transit agencies.

Clipper cards come in four varieties: adult, youth, senior and disabled (which includes Medicare cardholders). Adult Clipper cards may be obtained from a wide variety of vendors, but youth, senior and disabled Clipper cards must be obtained from SamTrans or another Bay Area transit agency. Each Clipper card contains some sort of stored value (e.g., monthly passes, "Clipper Cash" e-funds used for transit fares) and the history of recent trips using the card. Clipper cards generally confer an approximately 10% discount relative to cash fares.

SamTrans does not provide physical transfers, but Clipper cards offer free transfers to other SamTrans buses within 2 hours of the first boarding. SamTrans additionally offers a Day Pass which allows unlimited rides on local routes and a credit on higher-cost routes. The cost of the Day Pass is thrice the one-way fare on the local routes for adults, youth, and seniors/disabled/Medicare cardholders.

With the exception of youth summer passes, all SamTrans monthly passes must be loaded onto a Clipper card. Youth, senior and disabled monthly passes may only be loaded onto a corresponding Clipper card obtained from SamTrans or another Bay Area transit agency.

To ride SamTrans with Clipper card, the card must be "tagged" (read) by the Clipper card reader installed at the front of the bus near the farebox. The reader checks for a SamTrans monthly pass and local-fare credits from other agencies, computes the remaining fare and (if there is one) collects it in Clipper Cash. Note that northbound passengers on route KX to San Francisco must "tag" their Clipper card twice: once when boarding within San Mateo County (which collects a local fare or equivalent) and once before exiting in San Francisco (which collects any remaining fare).

Caltrain monthly passes (with two or more zones) and VTA monthly passes (that have been tagged on VTA in the last two hours) are honored on SamTrans as a local-fare credit. To use a local-fare credit from a monthly pass loaded onto a Clipper card on higher-cost routes, the remaining fare must be collected in Clipper Cash.

New fareboxes were installed in June 2011. The fareboxes collect fares, issue new magnetic striped tickets (e.g., day passes, change cards) and process previously issued magnetic striped tickets (e.g., day passes, youth summer passes, change cards). When a patron does not have exact change, a change card is issued with a cash value that can be redeemed at a future farebox transaction for up to a year.

Up to three kids under 5 with fare-paying rider can board for free.

=== Fleet ===
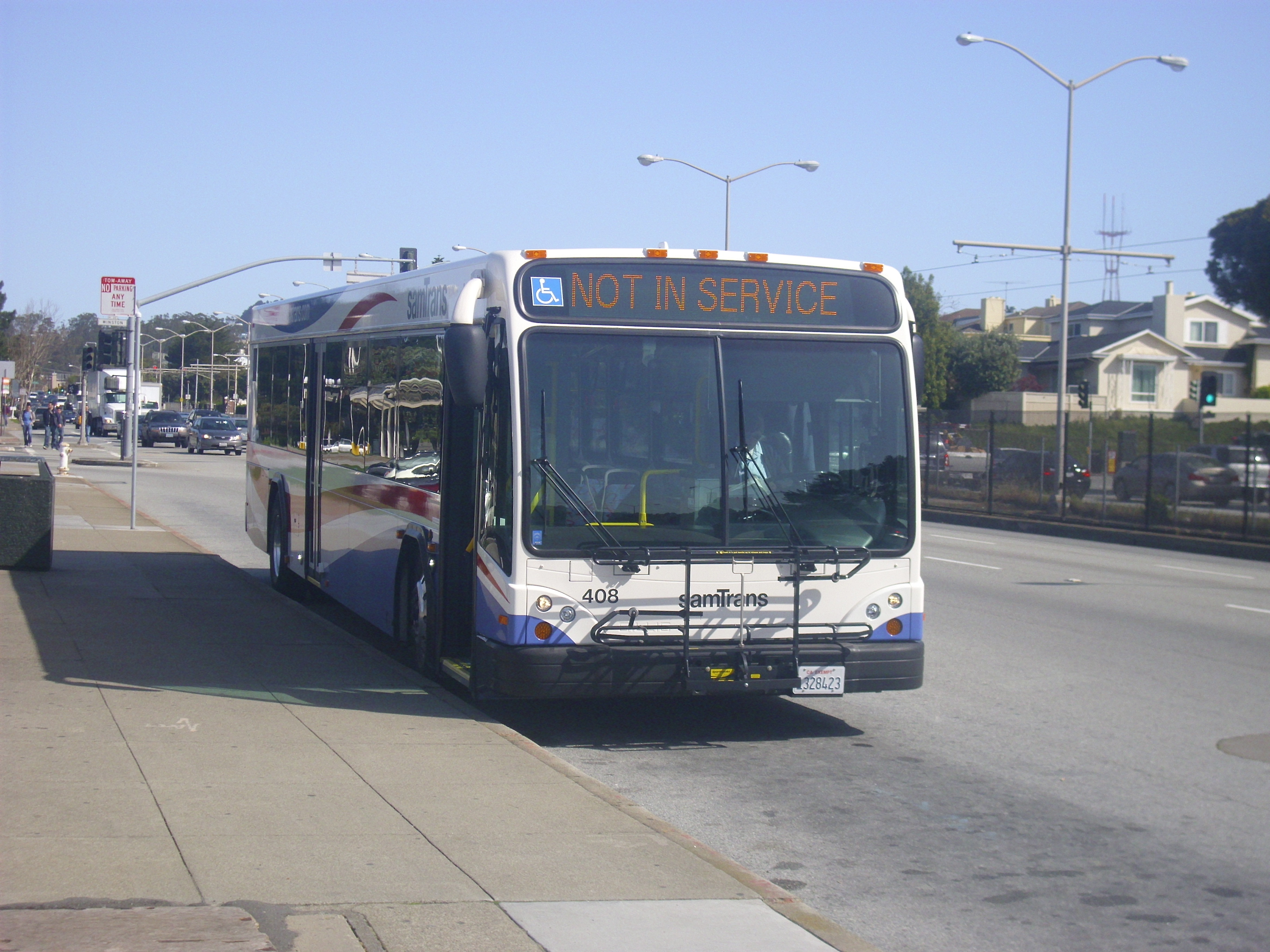
The most common type of bus operated by SamTrans, the Gillig BRT

SamTrans currently has a fleet of 296 buses of various sizes for its fixed-route service. Fifty-five are articulated buses made by New Flyer Industries with the 10 m (35 ft) and 12 m (40 ft) buses with low flooring, are made by the Gillig Corporation. Each bus is equipped with GPS tracking providing both visual and voice next-stop announcements, and are accessible to passengers in wheelchairs and those with limited mobility.

In 2009, SamTrans added 135 custom made Gillig low floor buses to their fleet, numbered 400-490, 500-539 & 2900-2903, replacing 137 older Gillig Phantom buses in their fleet.

In 2018, SamTrans placed an order for 10 Proterra 40-foot Catalyst BE40s buses as a first step towards the goal to have an all-electric fleet by 2033. The battery electric buses were expected to enter revenue service in early 2019, and a charging station will be installed at each SamTrans maintenance facility. However, issues with battery charges and turning radius led to Samtrans ending the program. Recently, Samtrans took possession and testing of a New Flyer battery power bus, which has now led to both bases getting chargers installed or in process of being installed.

In 2023, SamTrans ordered 108 hydrogen fuel cell buses from New Flyer at a cost of $168m. SamTrans aims to have a diesel free bus fleet by the mid 2030s.

== See also ==
- AC Transit
- Bay Area Rapid Transit
- Caltrain
- Clipper card
- Dumbarton Cut-off — disused transbay rail line owned by SamTrans
- List of SamTrans bus lines
- Muni Metro
- San Francisco Municipal Railway
- Santa Clara Valley Transportation Authority
