= Brookfield Conservation Park =

Protected area in South Australia

- IUCN category III (natural monument or feature)
- Location within South Australia
- Location: South Australia
- Nearest city: Blanchetown
- Coordinates: 34°21′22″S 139°29′24″E
- Established: 6 July 1978
- Governing body: Department for Environment and Water

Brookfield Conservation Park is a conservation park located in South Australia, about 130 km northeast of Adelaide.

== History ==
The area that became Brookfield Conservation Park was first settled in 1836 as a pastoral lease. Pioneer farming families kept sheep, which were confined in brush yards overnight and protected by shepherds living in simple slab huts. The area was later named Glen Leslie Station; during this period, the station grazed up to 2000 sheep and eucalyptus mallees on the land were razed for wood and charcoal. In 1971, using a $55,000 donation from the Forest Park Foundation of Peoria, the Chicago Zoological Society purchased the land as a conservation reserve for the southern-hairy nosed wombat (Lasiorhinus latifrons). The station was renamed Brookfield Zoo Wombat Reserve, after Brookfield Zoo in Chicago, Illinois. Six years later, the land was gifted to the Government of South Australia. Brookfield Conservation Park was formally proclaimed on 6 July 1978, under the National Parks and Wildlife Act 1972. Beginning in 2008, the park is now managed in partnership with Conservation Volunteers Australia.

== Wildlife ==
Brookfield Conservation Park comprises three main habitat types: open mallee Eucalyptus; arid woodland including sugarwood (Myoporum platycarpum) and dryland tea-tree (Melaleuca lanceolata); and arid shrubland including bluebush (Maireana spp). The park is home to an important population of the endangered southern hairy-nosed wombats. Other mammal species include fat-tailed dunnarts, common dunnarts, short-beaked echidnas, red kangaroos, and western grey kangaroos. The park's birdlife includes two species of fairywren, the splendid fairywren and purple-backed fairywren. Other notable birds include emus, ground cuckoo-shrikes, Australian owlet-nightjars and malleefowl.

== Gallery ==
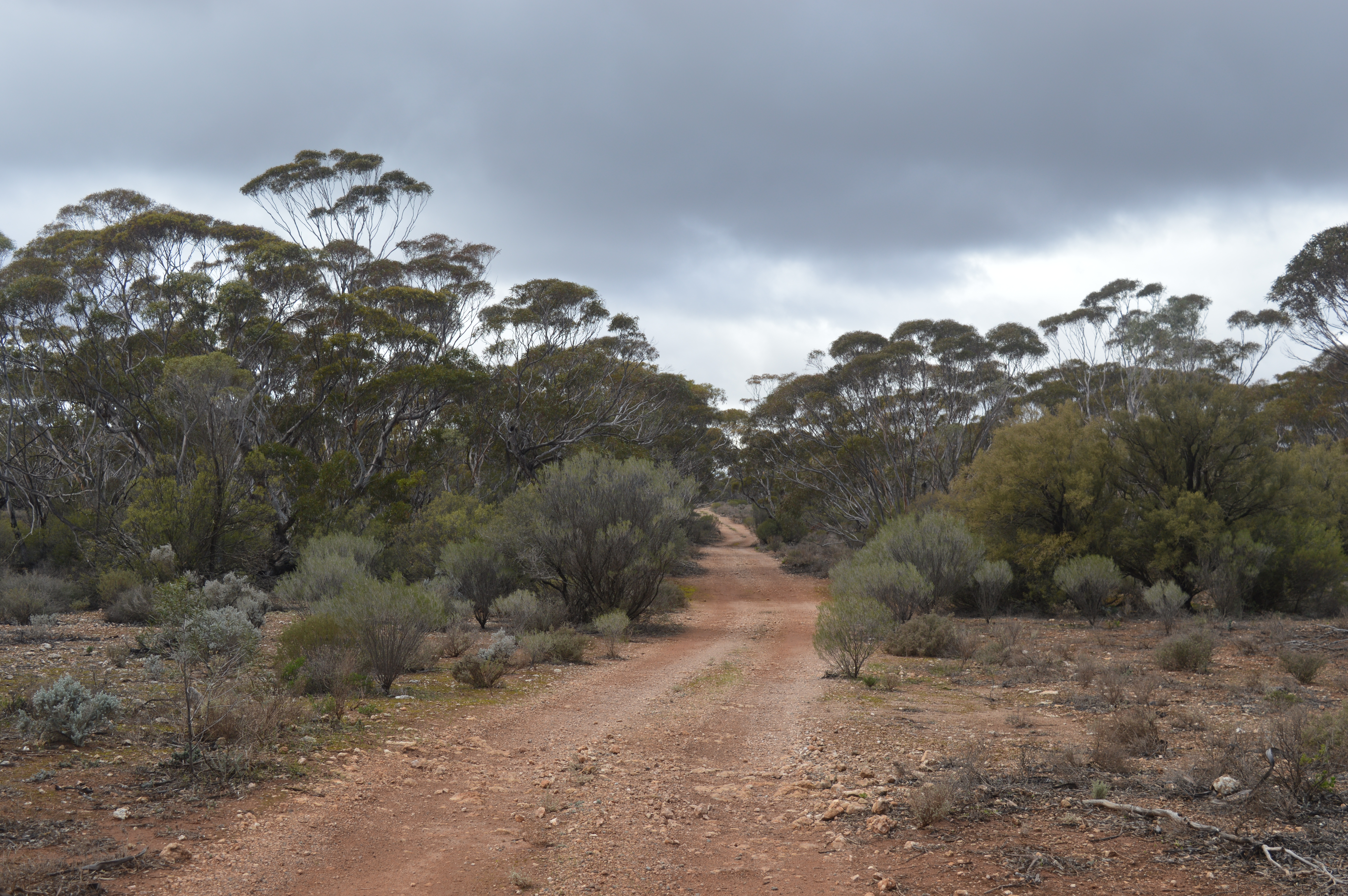
Dirt road running through the park

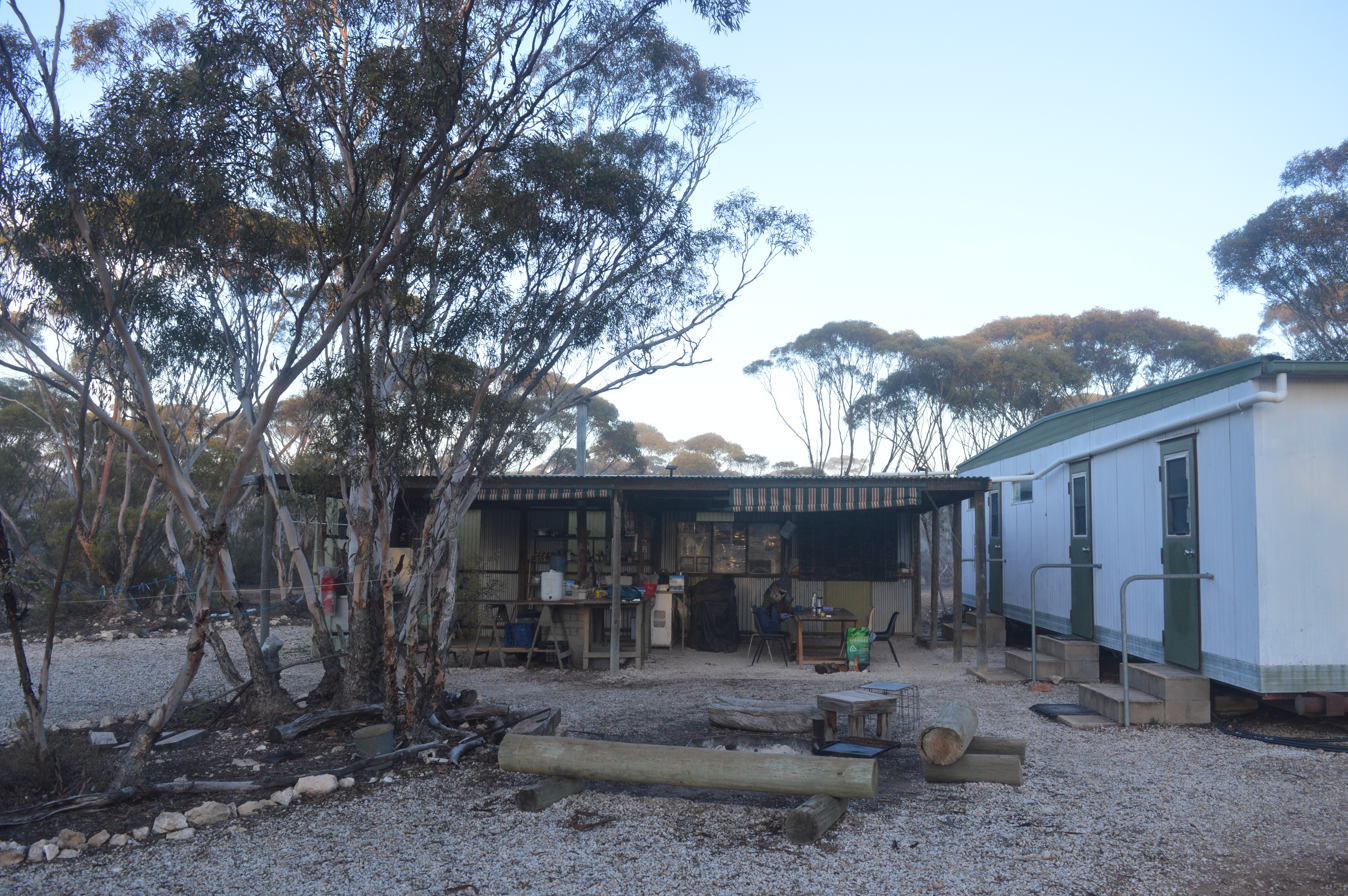
Accommodation for researchers

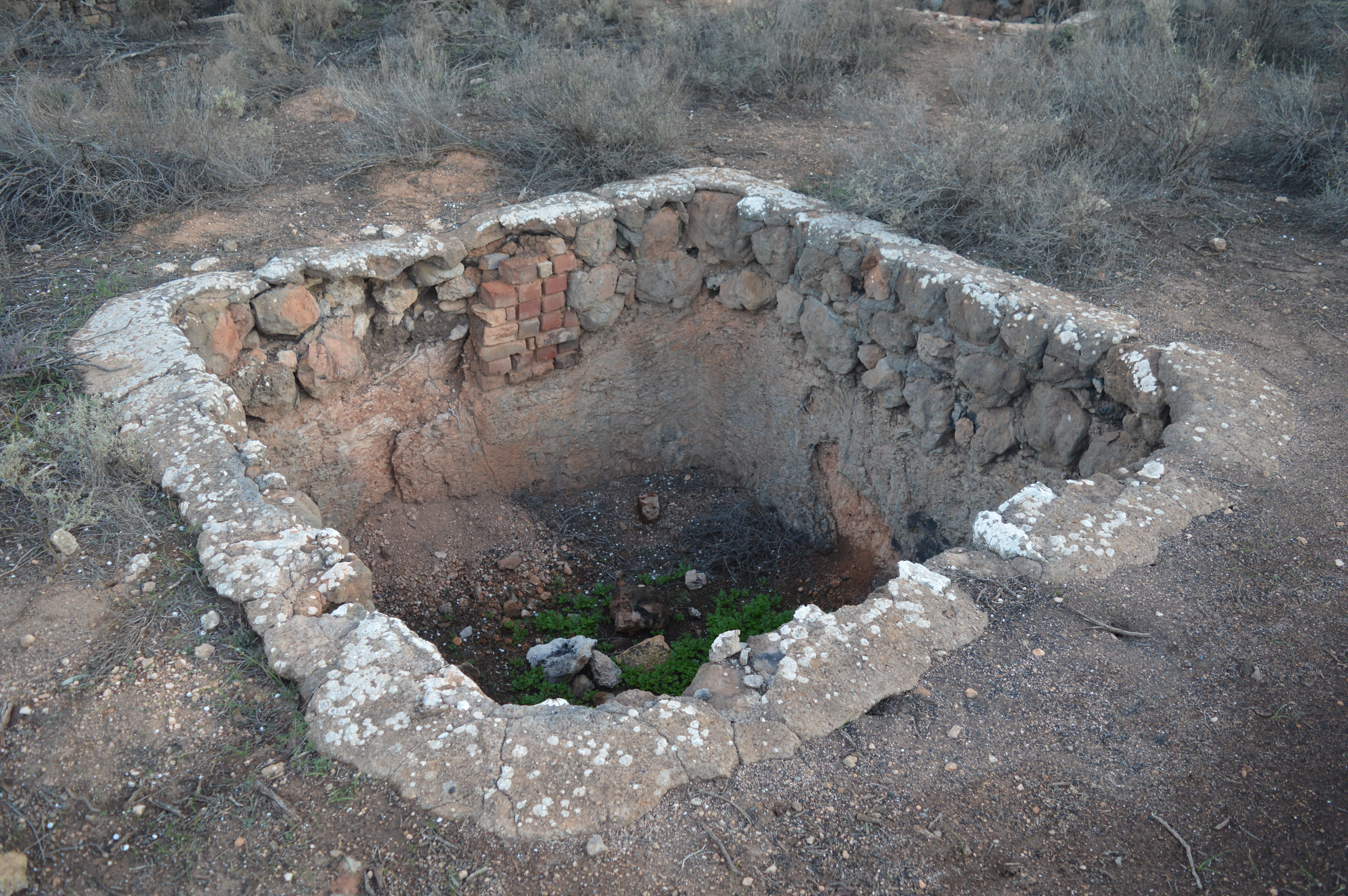
Derelict charcoal pit along the Charcoal Pits Walk

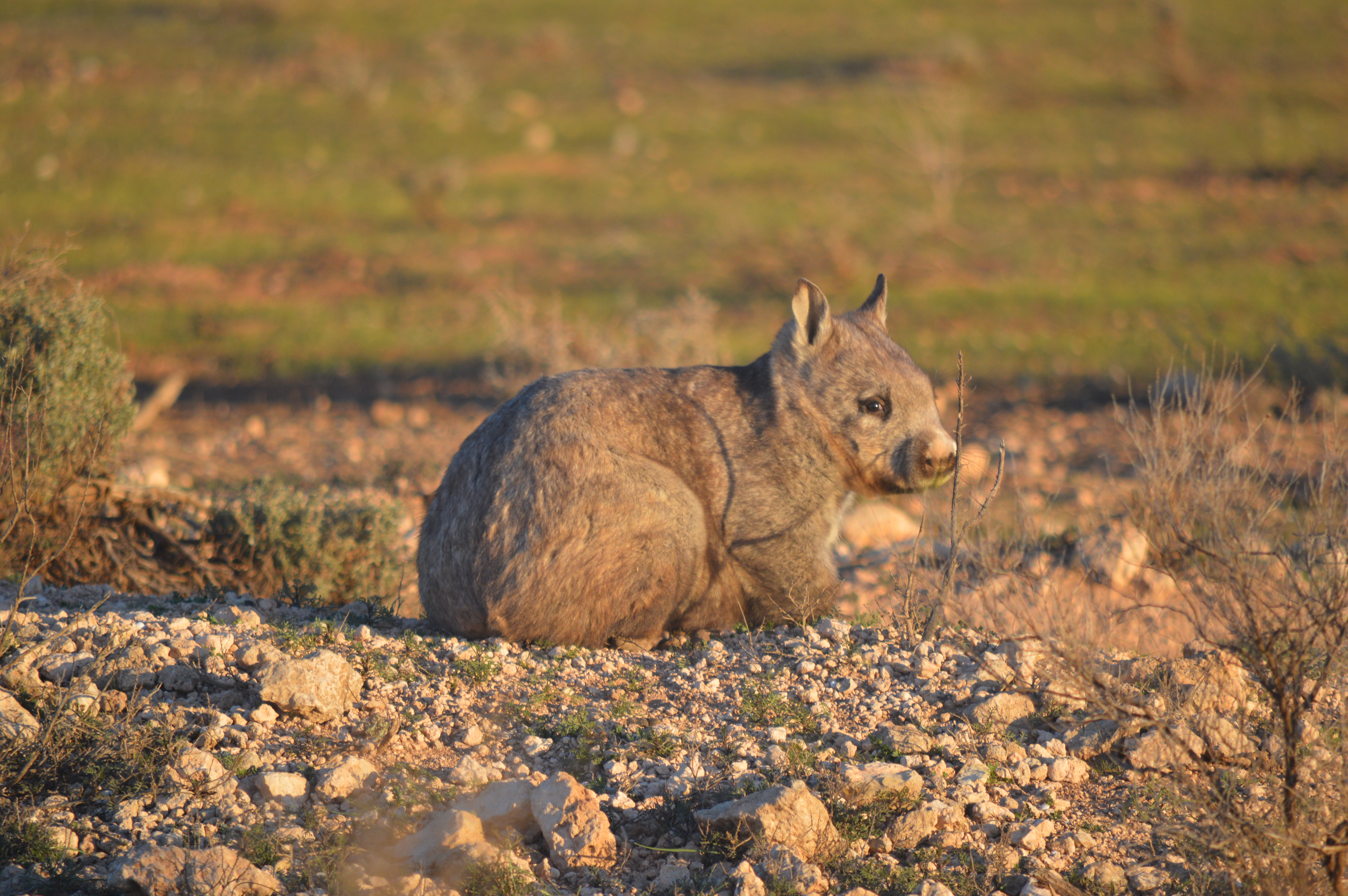
A southern hairy-nosed wombat

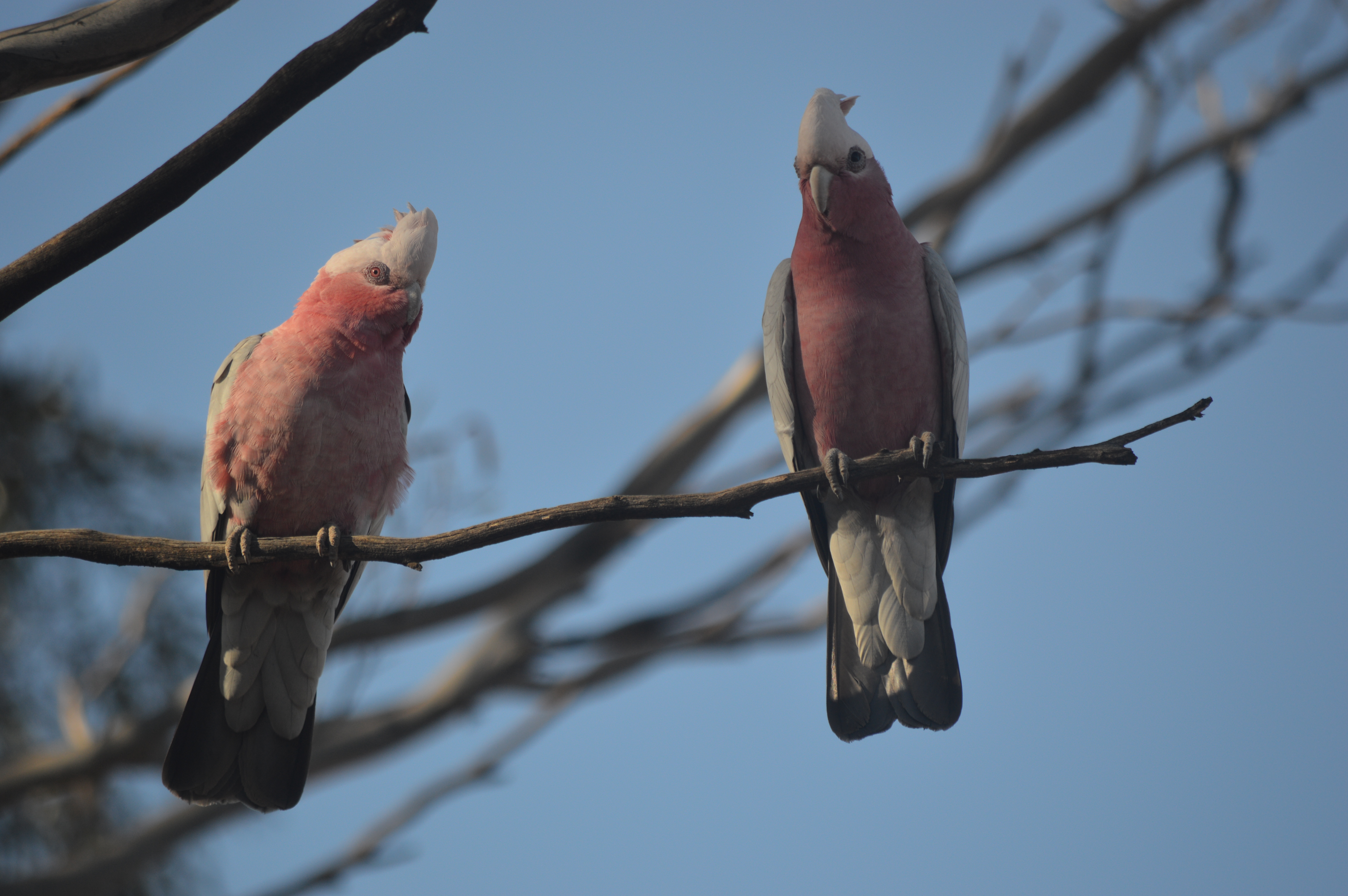
Two galahs
