= Dumbarton Rail Bridge =

Sole heavy rail-compatible crossing of the San Francisco Bay

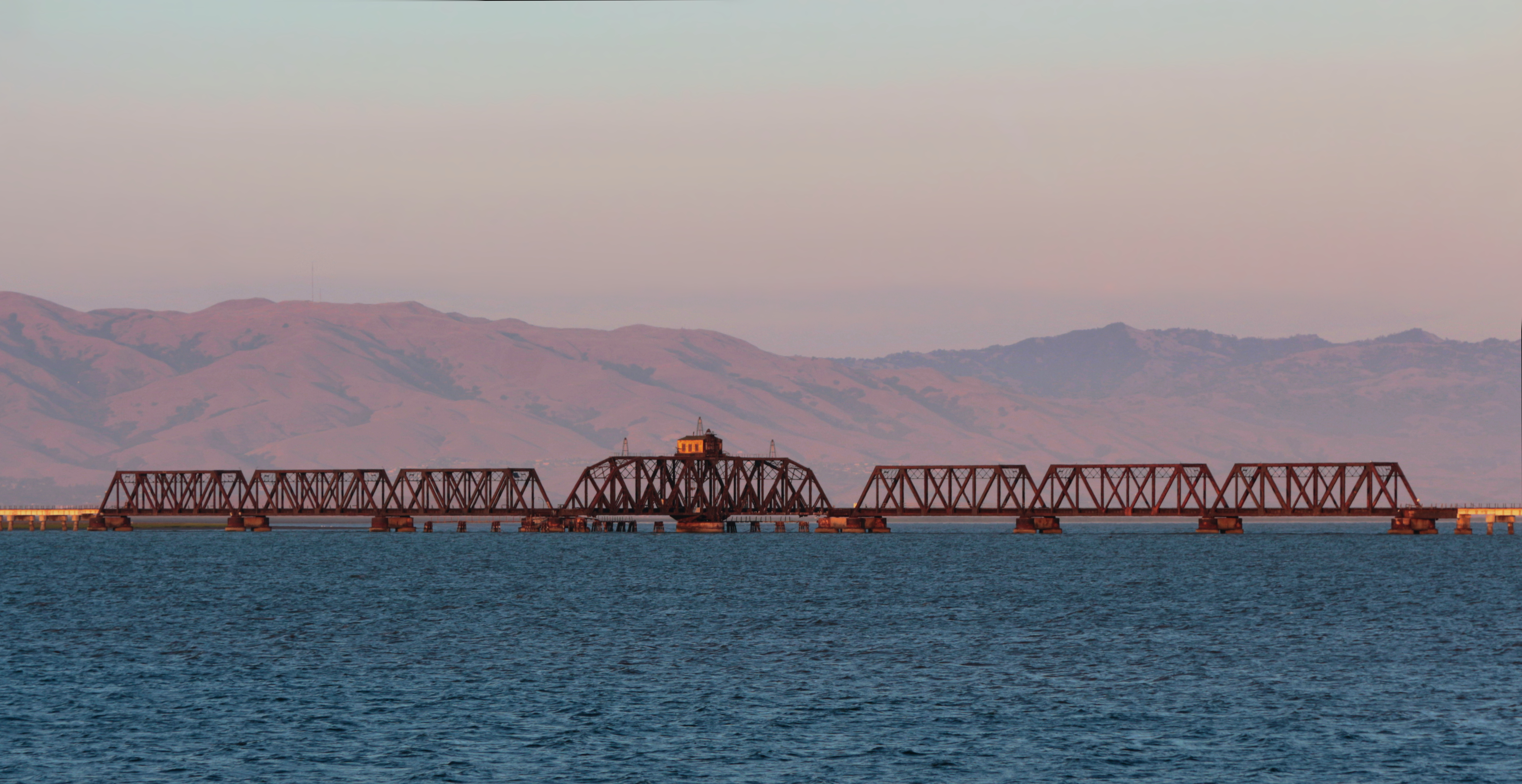
- The bridge in 2021
- Coordinates: 37.493137°N 122.116478°W
- Carried: single-track railway
- Crossed: San Francisco Bay (Newark Slough)
- Other name(s): Dumbarton Point Bridge; Dumbarton Bridge
- Named for: Dumbarton Point
- Owner: SamTrans

Characteristics
- Design: Pratt through truss with central swing Pennsylvania (Petit) through truss span, timber trestle approaches on east and west
- Total length: 8,058 feet (2,456 m) (including approaches & Newark Slough Bridge); 1,390 feet (420 m) (steel structure)
- Traversable?: No
- Longest span: 310 feet (94 m)
- No. of spans: 7, excluding approaches

History
- Designer: William Hood
- Constructed by: Southern Pacific
- Construction start: c. 1907
- Construction end: June 1910
- Construction cost: US$3,500,000 (equivalent to $120,900,000 in 2025)
- Inaugurated: September 12, 1910
- Collapsed: 1998
- Closed: 1982

Location
- Interactive map of Dumbarton Rail Bridge

The Dumbarton Rail Bridge lies just to the south of the Dumbarton road bridge. Built in 1910, the rail bridge was the first structure to span San Francisco Bay, shortening the rail route between Oakland and San Francisco by 26 miles (42 km). The last freight train traveled over the bridge in 1982, and it has been proposed since 1991 to reactivate passenger train service (connecting Caltrain on the Peninsula with ACE, BART and the Capitol Corridor in the East Bay) to relieve traffic on the road bridges, though this would entail a complete replacement of the existing bridge. Part of the western timber trestle approach collapsed in a suspected arson fire in 1998.

== History ==
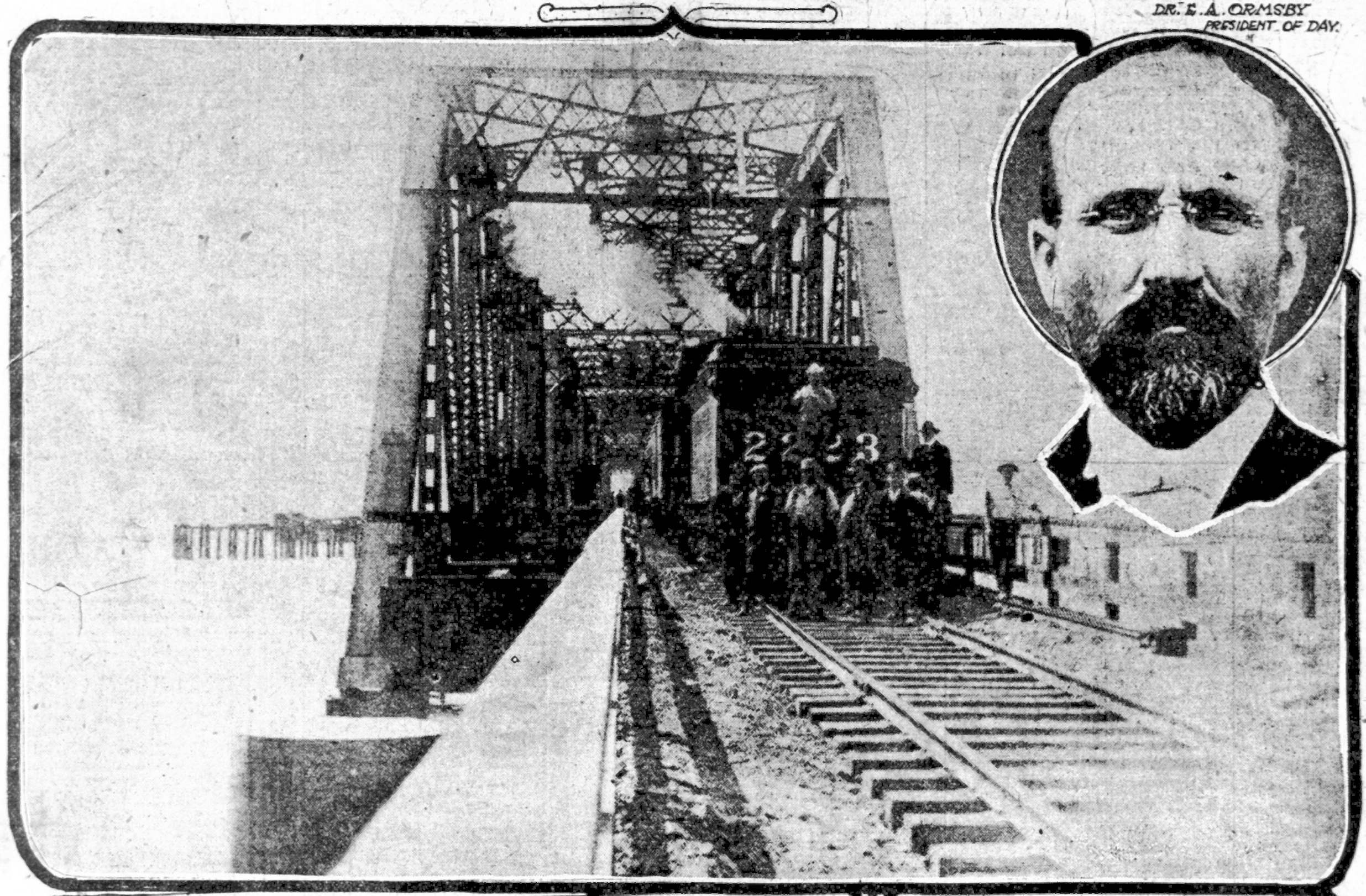
The first passenger train crosses the Dumbarton Bridge in 1910.

The Dumbarton Rail Bridge (then known as the Dumbarton Point Bridge or, simply, Dumbarton Bridge; one of the major structures of the Dumbarton Cut-off rail line) was championed by E. H. Harriman. Prior to the completion of the Dumbarton Cut-off, transcontinental rail freight was offloaded at Oakland and ferried to San Francisco. Preliminary work started in 1904 with the condemnation of land at Dumbarton Point, and the incorporation of the Central California Railway Company, created by several Southern Pacific officers for the sole purpose of building a rail line from Newark to San Mateo. There was some opposition to the bridge from local business groups, and the United States Army Corps of Engineers held a public hearing in August 1906 inviting public feedback on the plans for the bridge. Henry Rengstorff argued the bridge would impede water traffic, which was needed as an alternate route in case of a railroad strike or natural disaster, such as the recent earthquake.

=== Construction 1907–1910 ===
Work on the eastern trestle approaches was nearly complete by the end of 1907, but it was the foundation for the steel structure over the San Francisco Bay that posed the greatest challenge, due to the rushing current and marshy land approaches. Tracks were laid from Niles to Dumbarton starting in late 1906, and on the opposite side of the Bay, tracks were laid between Redwood City and the western bridge approach in 1908.

The Dumbarton Cut-off rail line includes a second swing bridge to the east of the Dumbarton Rail Bridge, spanning Newark Slough. The Newark Slough bridge was complete by May 1908.

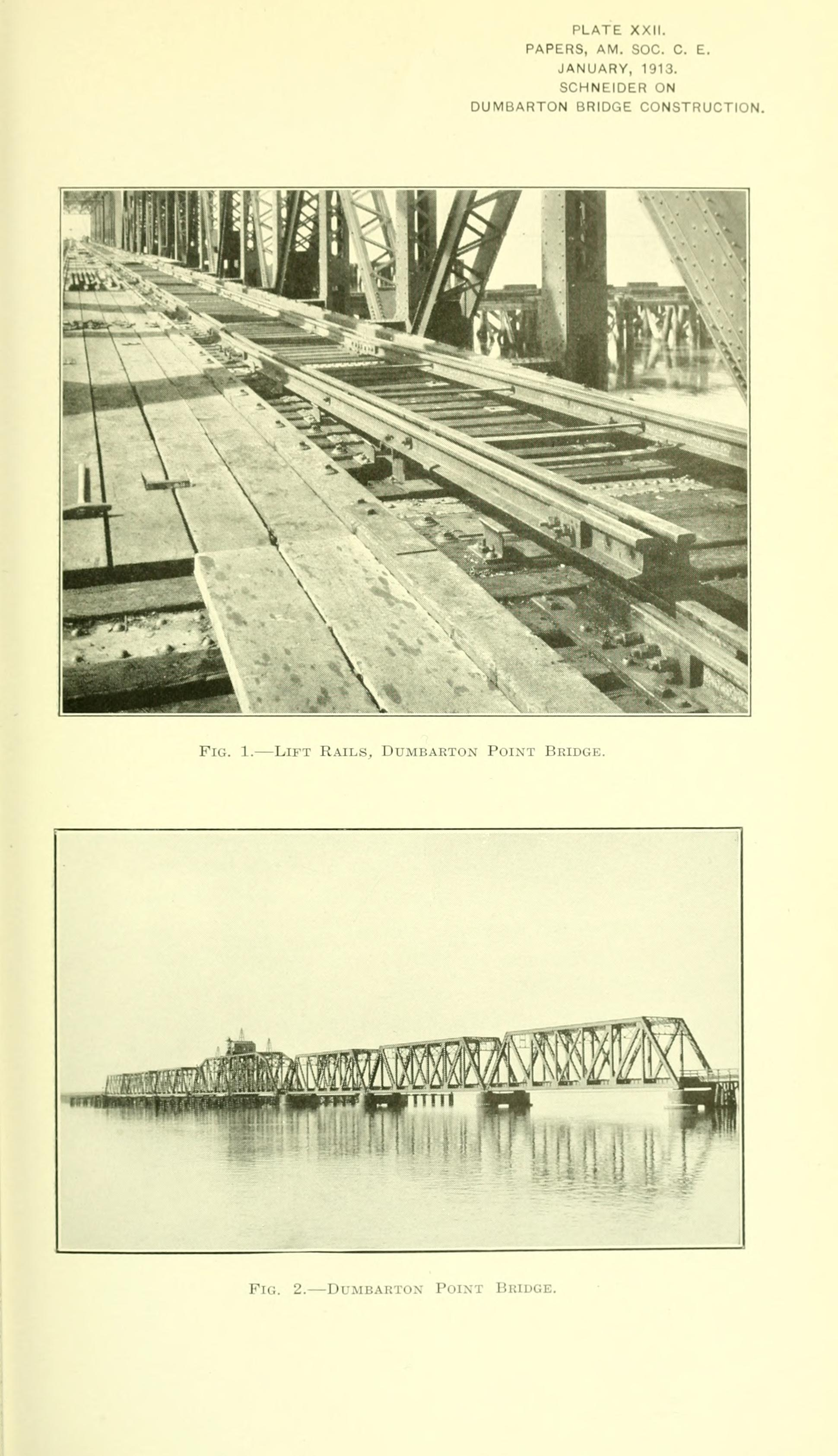
Dumbarton Rail Bridge (1910)

The bridge was initially anticipated to be completed in mid-1907, then March 1909, but it was not completed and opened until June 1910, providing San Francisco with a more direct transcontinental rail link for freight and passenger service, avoiding detours through Santa Clara and San Jose. Just prior to its opening, the San Francisco Call described the existing Southern Pacific passenger rail station at Third and Townsend as "notoriously inadequate," calling for a new or relocated station closer to Market Street. One of the conditions imposed on Southern Pacific in granting the construction permit was the Cut-off would be open to all railroad companies, although as the owner, Southern Pacific would be allowed to charge a toll.

=== In service ===
The bridge was the first constructed across San Francisco Bay. Freight service started on September 12, 1910, and the first passenger train crossed the Dumbarton Cut-off on September 25, 1910, although that was a special-event train, as Southern Pacific, the owner of the Cut-off, intended to limit traffic to freight service. At the time, it was the most expensive bridge structure built in California. Newark celebrated the start of rail service with a picnic. Regular passenger service departing Newark was established in 1911; the western terminus was Redwood City, where passengers could connect to the regular San Francisco – San Jose service.

The increased freight service afforded by the Dumbarton Cut-off caused some Hillsborough residents to complain about the black smoke. The Central California Railway transferred ownership of the entire Dumbarton Cut-off rail line from Niles to Redwood City to the Central Pacific (itself another subsidiary of Southern Pacific) in March 1912.

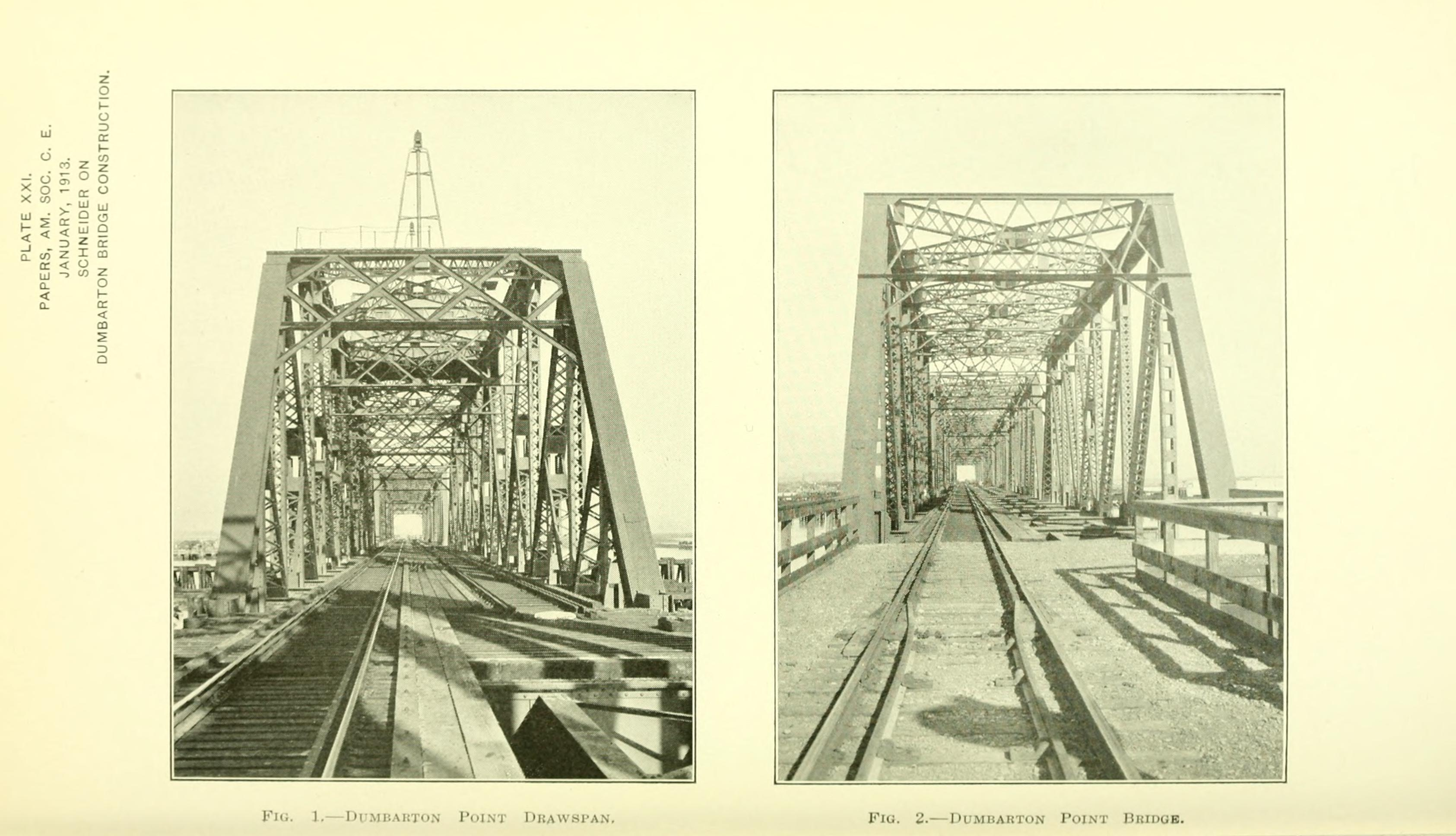
Dumbarton Rail Bridge swing span (left); truss span (right) (1910)

Some sections of the timber trestles were replaced with precast concrete structures in the 1960s and 1970s. The last freight train passed over the Dumbarton Cut-off in May 1982.

=== January 1998 fire ===
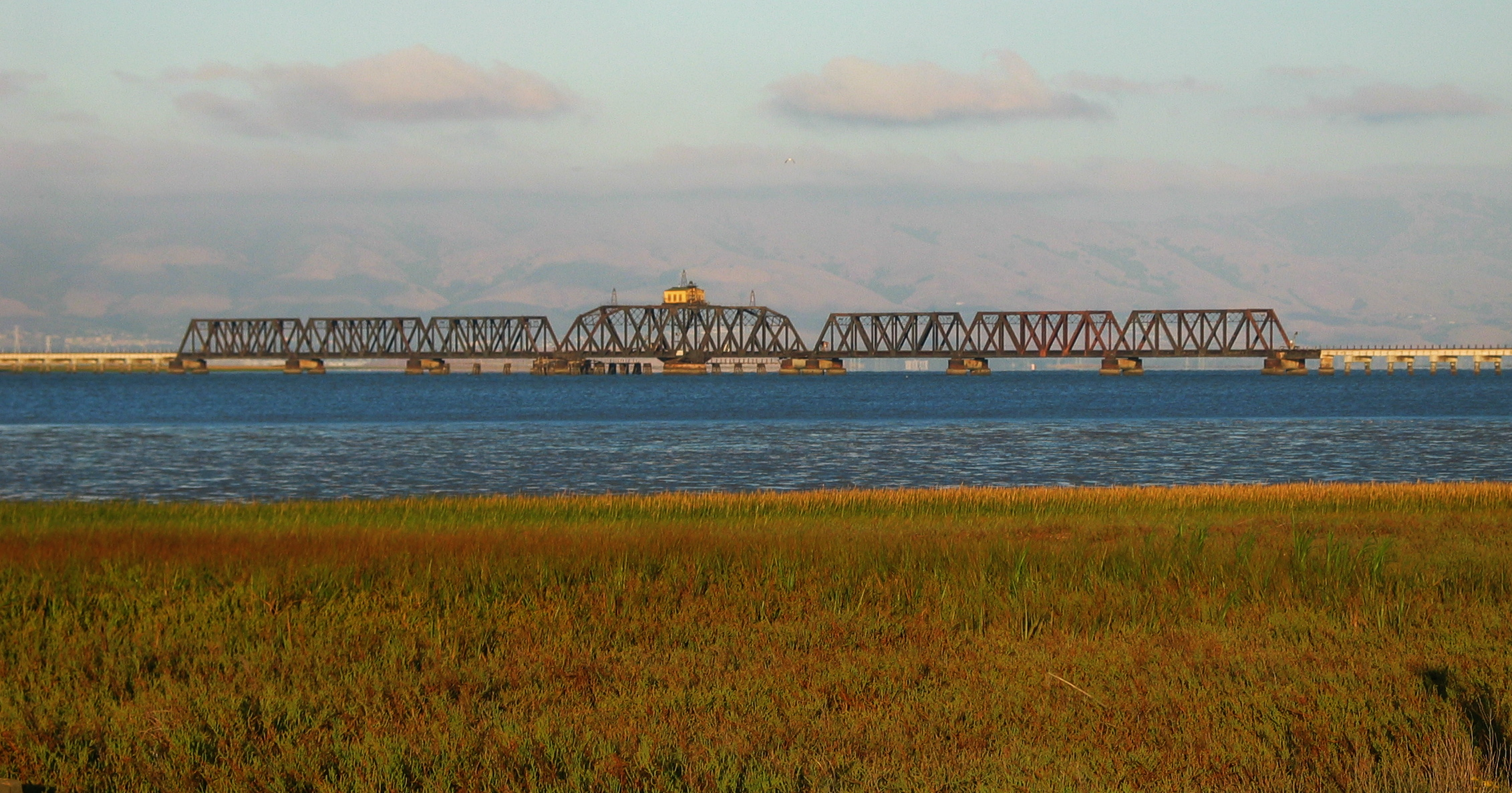
The bridge in 2003.

Just before 7 pm on the night of 3 January 1998, the western trestle approach caught on fire, and the smoke from the creosote-treated timbers forced the shutdown of the Dumbarton (road) Bridge in both directions. The fire was not extinguished until noon on 4 January 1998, despite a rainstorm. Access to the bridge was difficult, and firefighters were forced to use a rail maintenance vehicle along with a pump truck with a large reservoir, laying out over 4,000 feet (1,200 m) of fire hoses as the low tides and wetlands precluded access via fireboat. Arson was suspected as the cause of the fire, but never proven. No active electrical equipment was near the bridge, and no lightning was present. After continuing to receive complaints about smoke for three days, upon further investigation crews discovered the fire was continuing to burn wooden structures 20 to 30 feet (6 to 9 m) underground.

Newark Slough Bridge
- Coordinates: 37.513468°N 122.081970°W
- Carries: single-track railway
- Crosses: Newark Slough
- Other name: Newark Slough Drawbridge
- Named for: Newark Slough
- Owner: SamTrans

Characteristics
- Design: swing Baltimore through truss span, timber trestle approaches on east and west
- Total length: 422 feet (129 m) (including approaches); 182 feet (55 m) (steel structure)
- Longest span: 182 feet (55 m)
- No. of spans: 1, excluding approaches

History
- Construction start: c. 1907
- Construction end: May 1908
- Inaugurated: September 12, 1910
- Closed: 1982

Location
- Interactive map of Newark Slough Bridge

=== Dumbarton Rail Corridor ===
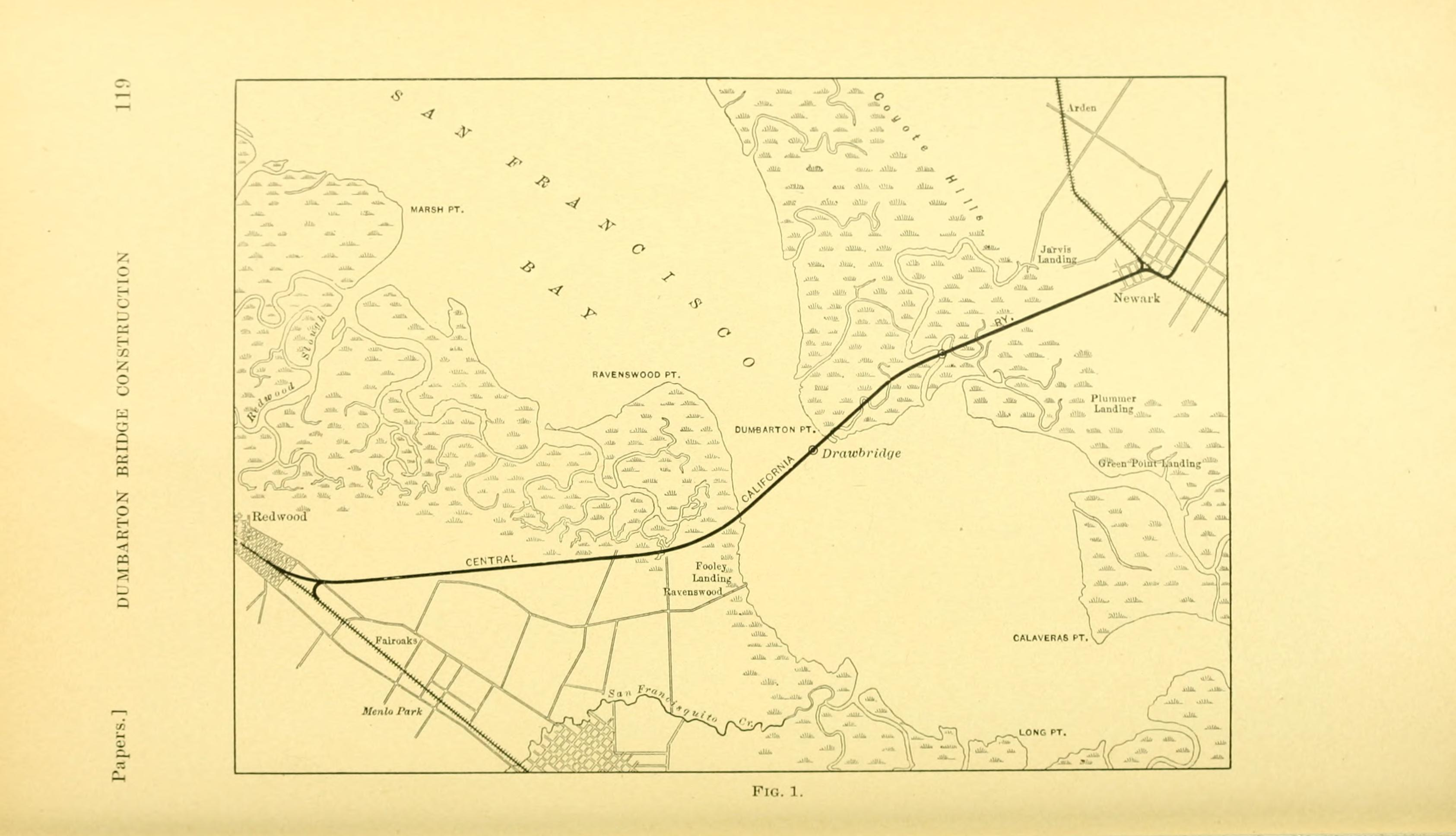
Central California Railway route (1910)

There are plans for new rail bridges, new stations, and rehabilitation of the rail line to serve a commuter rail service to connect Union City, Fremont, and Newark to San Francisco and San Jose. The proposed Dumbarton Rail Corridor service would provide six westbound trains originating from a rebuilt Union City intermodal station; after crossing the rebuilt Dumbarton Cut-off bridges, three trains would proceed north to San Francisco and three trains would proceed south to San Jose, making limited stop service at the existing Caltrain stations. From Union City, trains would stop at stations in Fremont (Fremont Centerville Station), Newark and Menlo Park/East Palo Alto before joining the main Caltrain line at Redwood City (northbound) or Menlo Park (southbound). In the afternoon, the six trains would return from San Francisco and San Jose to Union City. No reverse commute, midday, or nighttime trains would be part of the initial service. Two more stations could be added in Redwood City (2nd Avenue) and Hayward (Hayward BART) if rider participation would justify the cost.

- Dumbarton Rail Corridor proposed stations
- Existing stations rebuilt to add service
- New stations to be built
- Potential stations (expanded ridership)

SamTrans purchased the entire Dumbarton Cut-off from Redwood Junction to Newark Junction for US$6,900,000 (equivalent to $15,000,000 in 2025) in early 1994, with the help of a loan from Caltrans. Although the Dumbarton Rail Corridor was almost fully funded in 2001 (the Metropolitan Transportation Commission estimated the total capital cost for the Dumbarton Rail Corridor was US$129,000,000 (equivalent to $234,600,000 in 2025); of that, 91% had been secured or was pending via local sales taxes in San Mateo, Alameda, and Santa Clara Counties), subsequent studies, including the 2003 Dumbarton Rail Corridor Project Study Report, identified several deficiencies in the existing infrastructure. The 2003 Project Study Report proposed replacing the Dumbarton Rail Bridge swing span with a new bascule span, with the option for remote control from the Caltrain operations center or local control; the report also proposed replacing the Newark Slough Bridge swing span with a simpler steel girder swing span under local control, normally left closed to prioritize rail traffic over marine traffic. Other proposed improvements included a proposed fourteen-span bridge over Alameda Creek to separate freight and passenger traffic.

The required improvements to infrastructure drove up project costs dramatically. In 2004, the total capital cost had increased to an estimated US$277,600,000 (equivalent to $473,200,000 in 2025). However, Regional Measure 2 (RM2) was approved by a majority of Bay Area voters in March 2004, raising toll rates by US$1 on the region's toll bridges. US$135,000,000 (equivalent to $230,100,000 in 2025) was allotted to the Dumbarton Rail Corridor project from the increased tolls as one of the headline projects cited by supporters of RM2. In 2008, US$91,000,000 (equivalent to $136,100,000 in 2025) in RM2 funds were loaned from Dumbarton Rail Corridor to BART for work on the Warm Springs Extension. The 2008 estimate for DRC capital costs had risen to US$596,000,000 (equivalent to $891,200,000 in 2025), compared to the nearly US$300,000,000 (equivalent to $511,400,000 in 2025) in available funding that had been committed with the passage of RM2 in 2004, reducing the feasibility of Dumbarton Rail Corridor. The $91 million loan would become a grant in 2014 when the Metropolitan Transportation Commission voted to forgive the terms of the loan. With RM2 funds deprogrammed from Dumbarton Rail Corridor, the project was suspended. Efforts continue to revive the project.

=== June 2019 fire ===
On June 2, 2019, a brush fire that authorities suspected was arson spread to the wooden trestle on the eastern approach near the Newark Slough Bridge. Like the prior 1998 fire, firefighters had difficulty reaching the relatively remote location, and a firefighting boat was required during the response.

== Design ==
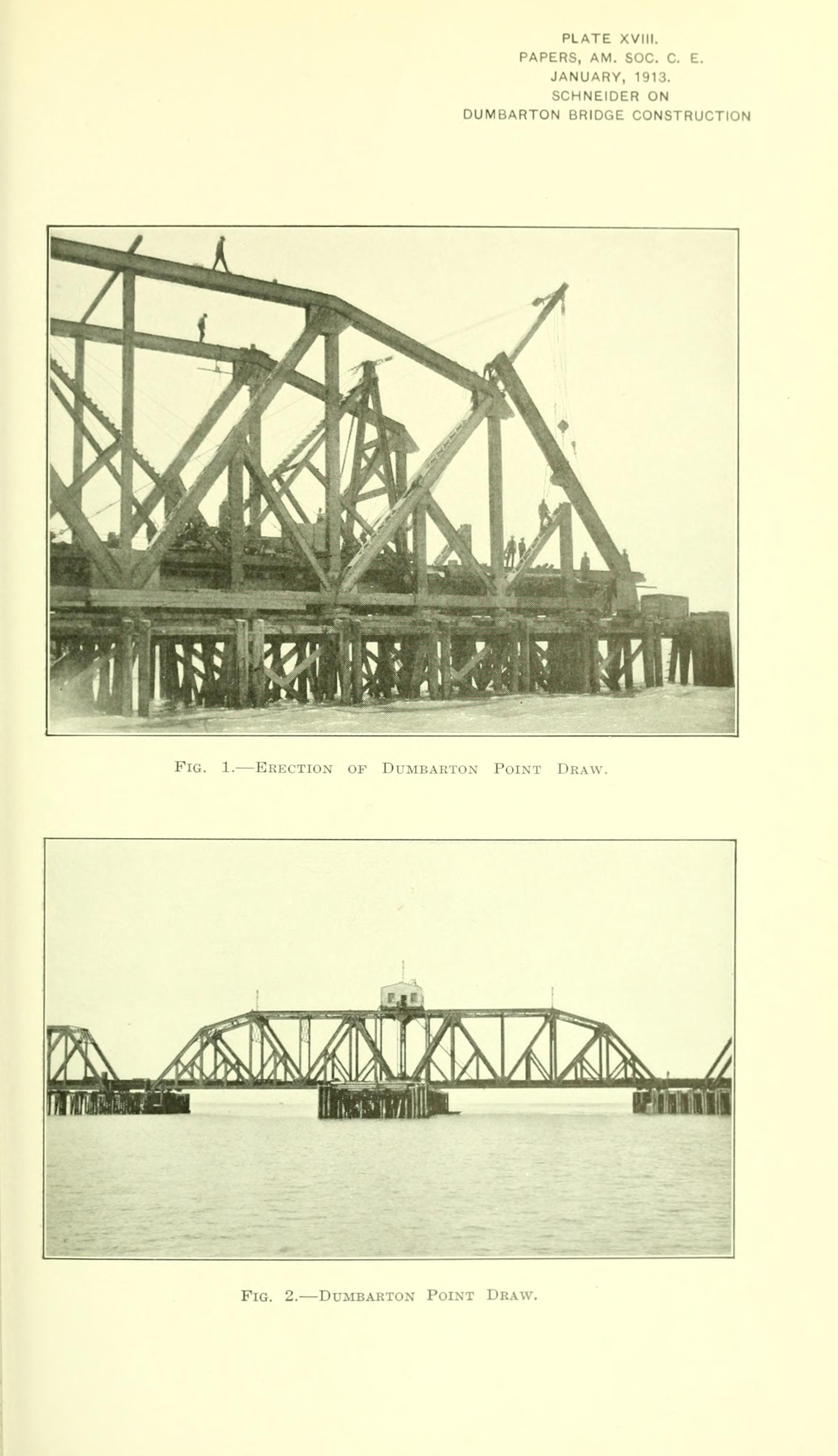
Dumbarton Rail Bridge swing span
(Petit through truss, 1910)

The Dumbarton Rail Bridge carries a single railroad track on six 180-foot (55 m) Pratt through truss spans and a central 310-foot (94 m) swing Petit through truss span, for a total steel bridge length of 1,390 feet (420 m). The steel structure is symmetric, with three truss spans flanking each side of the central swing span. Each 180-foot (55 m) truss span weighs approximately 470 to 480 short tons (430 to 440 t). The six truss spans were constructed on shore and floated into place using a converted freight car boat, the Thoroughfare. The swing span weighs approximately 1,215 to 1,500 short tons (1,102 to 1,361 t). When the swing span is open to accommodate water traffic, it affords a 125-foot (38 m) wide navigation channel to either side. The eastern trestle approach is 1,002 feet (305 m) long, and the western trestle approach was 5,366 feet (1,636 m) long.

The steel structure was designed to accommodate a double-track line. Both eastern and western trestle approaches were designed and built with single track service, as they were completed prior to the decision to accommodate double-track service on the steel structure. The swing span was completed with double-track lines.

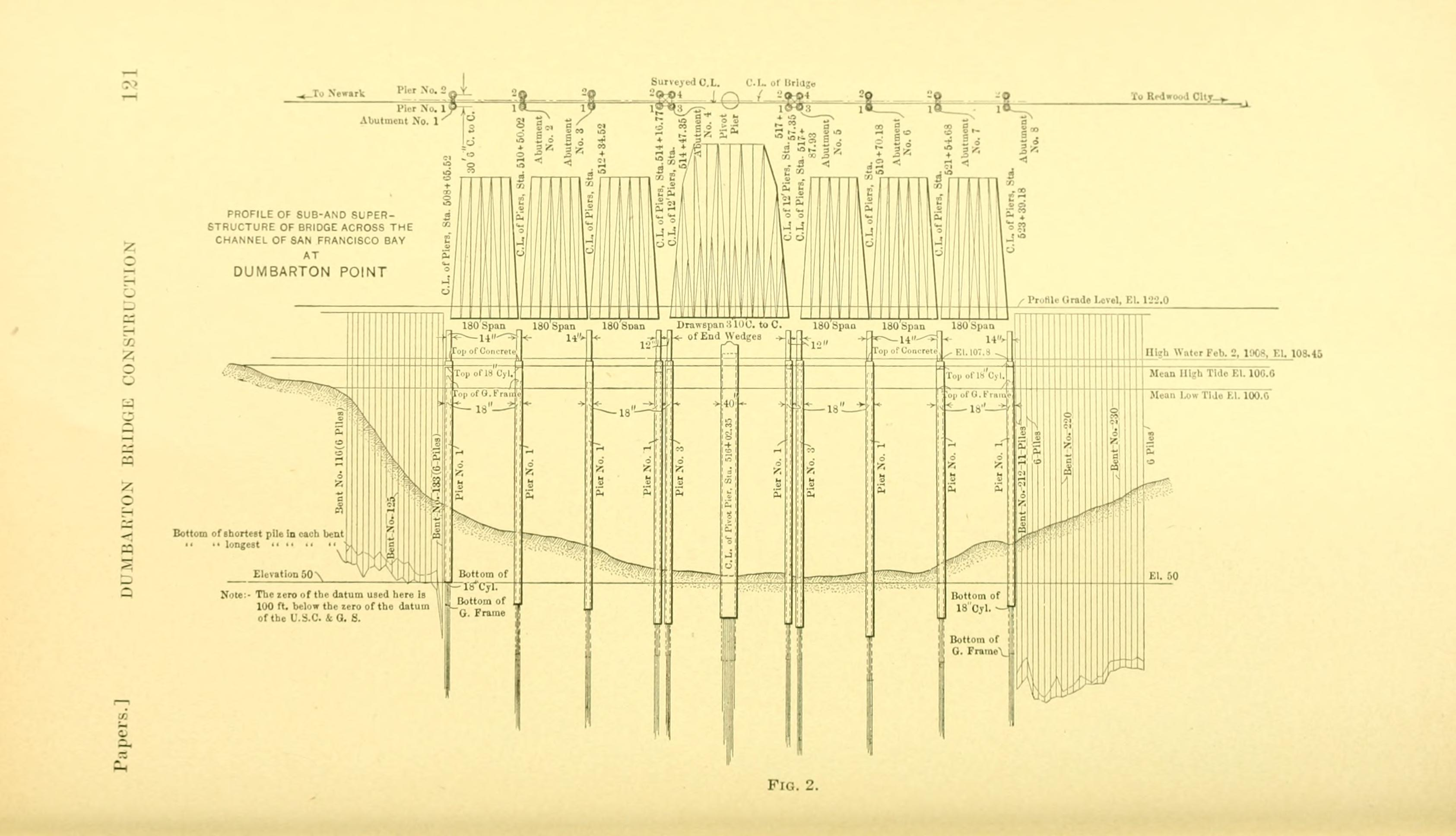
Dumbarton Rail Bridge profile and depth (1910)

The bridge was designed to accommodate automobile or horse traffic on an overhead platform. A proposal for an upper-deck road was advanced in 1907, prior to the completion of the bridge, but was dismissed as unlikely just a few months later.

The Cut-off reduces the distance (by rail) between Oakland and San Francisco by 26.1 miles (42.0 km).

The depth of the Bay at the middle of the channel was 50 feet (15 m) at mean low tide, with a mean high tide variance of 6 feet (1.8 m). Preliminary test piles had shown the mud was 2 to 4 feet (0.61 to 1.22 m) deep in the middle of the channel and 16 to 18 feet (4.9 to 5.5 m) deep at the shoreline, atop a layer of sand and gravel ranging from 15 to 20 feet (4.6 to 6.1 m) deep. Each truss span rests on two cylindrical concrete piers 18 feet (5.5 m) in diameter at either end, except where the truss spans meet the swing span. The truss-swing span interface is supported on four cylindrical concrete piers 18 feet (5.5 m) in diameter. The swing span's center is supported by a 40-foot (12 m) diameter cylindrical concrete pier resting atop more than one hundred piles.

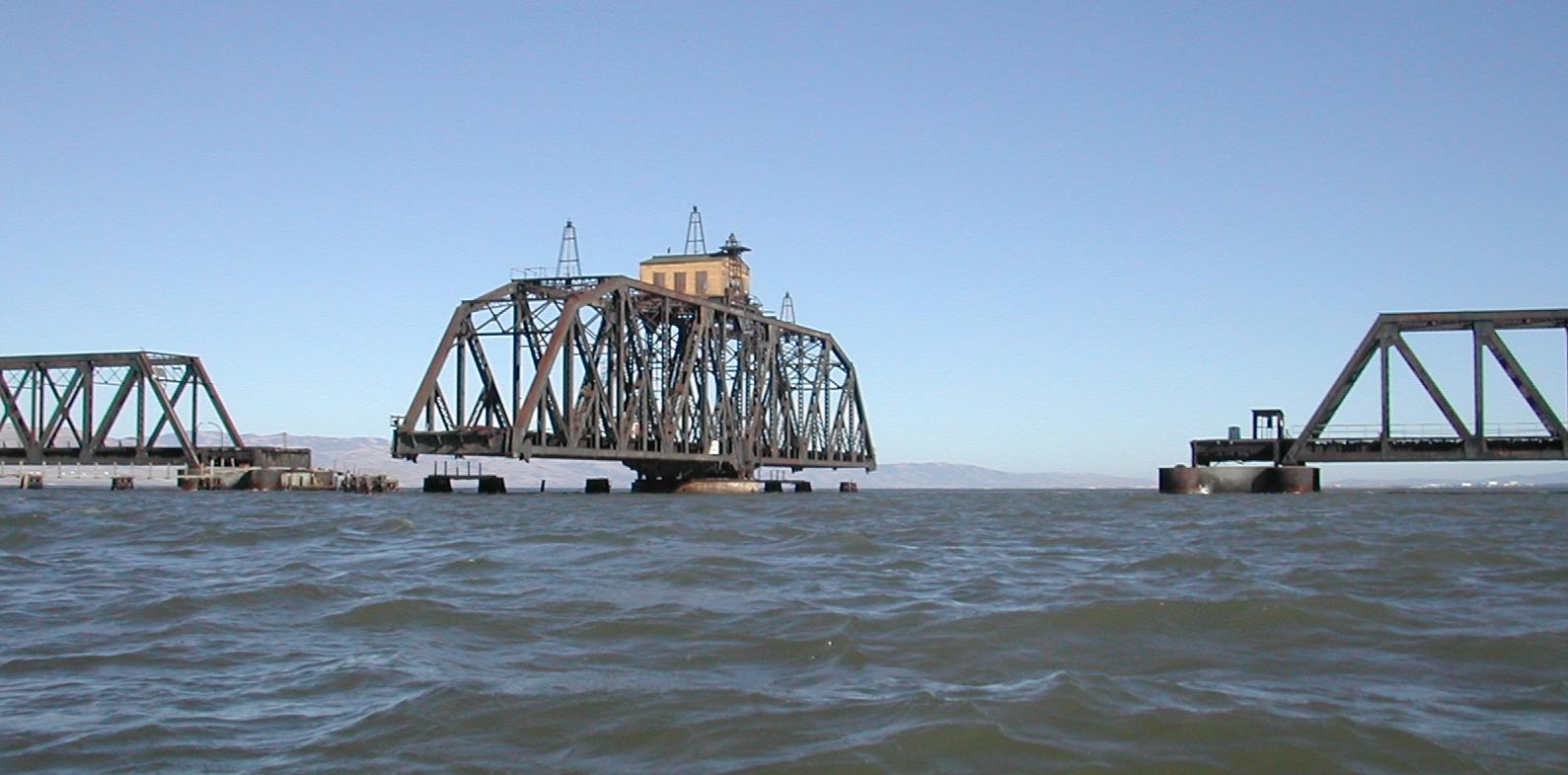
Dumbarton Rail Bridge in 2007 (seen from a kayak)

The original bridge design for the San Francisco Bay span called for trestle approaches all the way to the swing span. On 21 August 1907, the supports for a 120-foot (37 m) section of eastern approach trestle, which had been built to within 120 feet (37 m) of the swing span, washed out in the receding tide and the bridge plans were modified. The first proposed change was to modify the trestle approaches 200 feet (61 m) immediately to the east and 600 feet (180 m) immediately to the west of the swing span by changing these to double-track width. However, the wider trestle bents continued to vibrate in the receding tide. The final as-built design eliminated approximately 1,080 feet (330 m) of trestle approaches in favor of the six 180-foot (55 m) steel truss spans, three on either side of the swing span.

The swing span across Newark Slough is similar to the Dumbarton Rail Bridge swing span; both are through truss swing spans, both are sized for double-track service, and both have a Mechanic/Operator's house atop the center of their respective trusses. The Newark Slough bridge is 182 feet (55 m) long and is a Baltimore truss design. The single-track timber trestle approaches to the Newark Slough swing span are built all the way to the swing span rest piers, and so the as-built Newark Slough span is presumably similar to the original design of the Dumbarton Rail Bridge, prior to the 1907 redesign incorporating flanking trusses.

When the Dumbarton Rail Bridge was in use, boaters would signal the operator, who would start a diesel engine and rotate the bridge to the open position on a large gear. The bridge could swing open or closed in two minutes. After the decommissioning of the railway, the bridge has since been welded into the open position.
