= Cost and Management Accountant (India) =

Professional designation for accountants

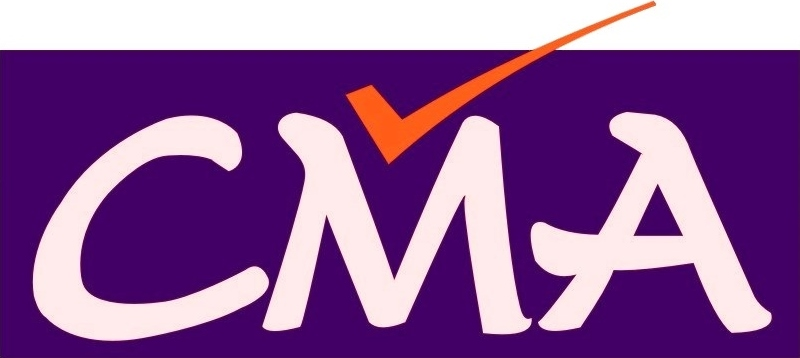
CMA Logo for exclusive use by Indian CMAs

Cost And Management Accountant (India) aka CMA is a professional qualified certification issued by Institute of Cost Accountants of India (ICMAI). A Cost and Management Accountant (CMA) in India plays a pivotal role in the financial and operational management of organizations. CMAs are experts in cost accounting, financial planning, and strategic management, providing critical insights that help businesses optimize their resources, enhance profitability, and ensure sustainable growth. Regulated by the Institute of Cost Accountants of India (ICMAI), the profession requires rigorous education, clear three level of exams and practical training. CMAs are integral to various sectors, including manufacturing, services, and public enterprises, where they contribute to effective cost control, performance evaluation, and strategic decision-making. CMAs maintain and utilize accounting records to build plans, policies, strategies and organizational goals for the optimum performance.

== Education ==
ICMAI regulates the curriculum in 3 levels—Foundation, Intermediate and Final—similar to ICAI. The new education curriculum revised in the year 2020 require 15 months of practical training before Final exam. The CMA career has seen a rise in India, as it provides opportunity in different sector and a higher position.

== Responsibilities ==
A Cost and Management Accountant (CMA) are contributing since many decades though their expert knowledge and skills in different sectors like finance, manufacturing, consulting, audit, IT, health etc. Some of the

Major responsibilities of CMAs are

- Budgeting and Forecasting
- Financial Analysis
- Internal Auditing and Control
- Management reporting - Risk and Strategic
- Cost management
- CFO services
- Direct Tax
- Indirect Tax
- Cost Accounting System Implementation
- Cost Audit
- Management Audit
- Stock Audit
- Internal Audit
- Income Tax- Inventory Valuation and many more

== History ==
The Institute of Cost Accountants of India (formerly known as The Institute of Cost and Works Accountants of India) was established in 1944 as a registered company under the Companies Act. On May 28, 1959, the Institute gained statutory recognition through a special act of Parliament—the Cost and Works Accountants Act, 1959. It operates through four regional councils—Kolkata, Chennai, Delhi, and Mumbai—as well as several important chapters across India and abroad. As the sole recognized statutory professional organization and licensing body in India specializing exclusively in Cost and Management Accountancy, the Institute plays a crucial role. Its primary objectives are to promote, regulate, and develop the profession of Cost Accountancy.

== Recognition ==
Cost And Management Accountant (India) are eligible for courses to do Ph.D in universities based in India, National Eligibility Test (NET) conducted by UGC and the award of Fellowship in Junior Research or Assistant Professor as the degree holders of Cost and Management Accountancy (CMA) course have been recognised as equivalent to Post Graduates by the UGC.

== See also ==
- Institute of Cost Accountants of India
