= Catchment Management Authority =

Catchment Management Authority may refer to:

- Catchment Management Authority (New South Wales)
- Catchment Management Authority (Victoria)
