= Canadian Malayalee Association =

Canadian non-profit organization

The Canadian Malayalee Association (CMA) is a secular, non-political, non-partisan, and an incorporated non-profit organization (Reg. No:1701711) of Malayalees in Canada.

All people of Kerala ethnic origin, living anywhere in Canada are eligible to become the members of the CMA.

== Objectives ==
The main objectives of CMA are:

- To promote social and cultural integration of Malayalees in Canada
- To foster and promote the South Indian culture and to network the community in Canada
- To organize social activities and cultural programs designed to promote cultural interchange and quality of life in Canada and safeguard the Kerala culture
- To promote the mother tongue Malayalam language among younger generations of Canadian Malayalees
- To provide help and guide the needy
- To promote advancement of education by providing scholarships, bursaries and prizes for scholastic achievement
- To work for the development of the Kerala Community to make it a political power in Canada politics in the near future
- To help assist and render relief to all in distress caused by calamities

== Events ==
Canadian Malayalee Association hosts cultural events marking traditional festivals and events from Kerala like:

- Onam events, where the Onam meal 'sadhya' is served to thousands of Malayalees, wearing the traditional dresses such as the jubba, mundu, and sari. Musical accompaniment with musical instruments like chenda, elathalam etc.
- Vasantholsavam (Spring Festival), with variety of programs like thullal, dances, songs, oppana, koodiyattam, kathakali, etc.
- Christmas, with variety programs including dinner and dance, etc. and conduct tours, family picnics. Also used to conduct competitions for Santa competition, poster painting, tug of war, songs, dances like thiruvathira, mohiniyattam, bharathanatyam, oppana and cinematic dances.
