= Congestion management agency =

In the U.S. state of California, a congestion management agency (CMA) is a county-level government agency responsible for a comprehensive transportation improvement program that reduces traffic congestion and reduces transportation-related air pollution through local land-use planning.

Under the California State Legislature to implement Proposition 111 (also known as the Traffic Congestion Relief and Spending Limitation Act of 1990), each county with 50,000 or more residents – in other words, any county required to have a metropolitan planning organization under federal law – must also designate a local government agency to develop a congestion management program (CMP) or forfeit its share of state gasoline tax revenues. In 1996, Assembly Bill 2419 allowed counties to opt out of the CMP requirement by implementing an alternative mechanism for congestion management, and made the CMP voluntary for counties with fewer than 200,000 residents. San Diego County at one point opted out of the CMP in favor of a regional fee applied to new developments.

== List of congestion management agencies ==
Each county designates a local government agency as its CMA. The designated agencies are a variety of public transportation districts, joint powers authorities, and councils of governments.

- Alameda County: Alameda County Transportation Commission
- Contra Costa County: Contra Costa Transportation Authority
- Fresno County: Fresno Council of Governments
- Imperial County
- Kern County: Kern Council of Governments
- Kings County
- Los Angeles County: Los Angeles County Metropolitan Transportation Authority
- Madera County
- Marin County: Transportation Authority of Marin
- Merced County
- Monterey County: Transportation Agency for Monterey County
- Napa County: Napa Valley Transportation Authority
- Orange County: Orange County Transportation Authority
- Placer County: Placer County Transportation Planning Agency
- Riverside County: Riverside County Transportation Commission
- Sacramento County: Sacramento Area Council of Governments
- San Benito County
- San Bernardino County: San Bernardino County Transportation Authority
- San Diego County: San Diego Association of Governments
- San Francisco: San Francisco County Transportation Authority
- San Joaquin County: San Joaquin Council of Governments
- San Luis Obispo County: none since 1996
- San Mateo County: City/County Association of Governments of San Mateo County
- Santa Barbara County: Santa Barbara County Association of Governments
- Santa Clara County: Santa Clara Valley Transportation Authority
- Santa Cruz County: Santa Cruz County Regional Transportation Commission
- Shasta County: Shasta County Regional Transportation Planning Agency
- Solano County: Solano Transportation Authority
- Sonoma County: Sonoma County Transportation Authority
- Stanislaus County: Stanislaus Council of Governments
- Sutter County
- Tulare County: Tulare County Association of Governments
- Ventura County: Ventura County Transportation Commission
- Yolo County: Yolo County Transportation District
- Yuba County

== See also ==
- Transportation improvement district
- Transportation demand management
