= CMAS (gene) =

Protein-coding gene in the species Homo sapiens

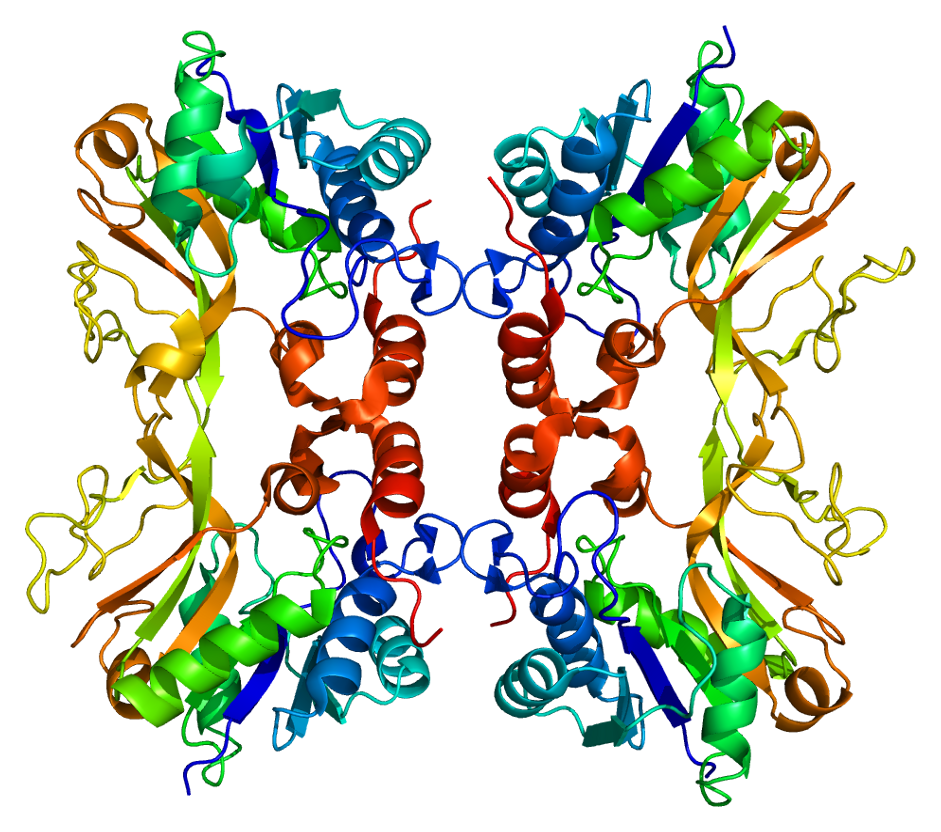

Identifiers
- Aliases: CMAS, CSS, cytidine monophosphate N-acetylneuraminic acid synthetase
- External IDs: OMIM: 603316; MGI: 1337124; HomoloGene: 7670; GeneCards: CMAS; OMA:CMAS - orthologs

Gene location (Mouse)
Chr.	Chromosome 6 (mouse)
Band	6 G2|6 74.66 cM	Start	142,702,412 bp
Band	6 G2|6 74.66 cM	End	142,721,440 bp
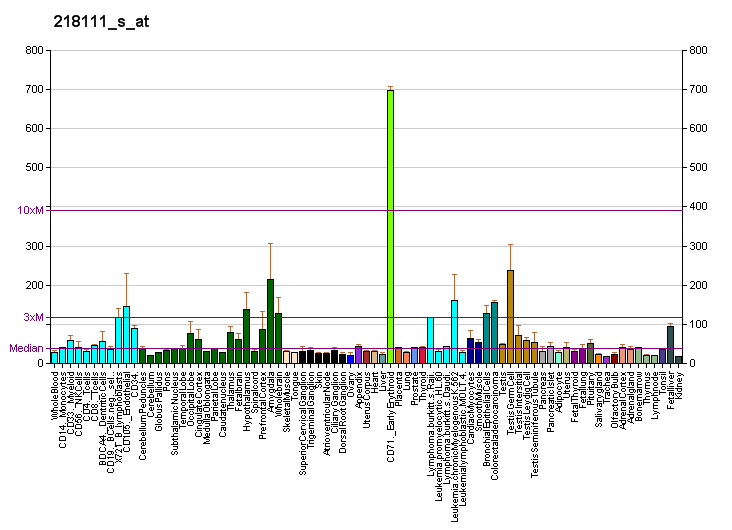
RNA expression pattern
Bgee	Human / Mouse (ortholog); Top expressed in: rectum; prefrontal cortex; left adrenal gland; dorsolateral prefrontal cortex; Brodmann area 9; amygdala; islet of Langerhans; monocyte; nucleus accumbens; duodenum / Top expressed in: fetal liver hematopoietic progenitor cell; conjunctival fornix; blood; submandibular gland; left colon; facial motor nucleus; tibiofemoral joint; superior cervical ganglion; medial vestibular nucleus; dorsal tegmental nucleus; More reference expression data
BioGPS	More reference expression data
Gene ontology
Molecular function	transferase activity; nucleotidyltransferase activity; N-acylneuraminate cytidylyltransferase activity
Cellular component	membrane; nucleus; nucleoplasm
Biological process	N-acetylneuraminate metabolic process
Sources:Amigo / QuickGO
Orthologs
Species	Human	Mouse
Entrez	55907	12764
Ensembl	n/a	ENSMUSG00000030282
UniProt	Q8NFW8	Q99KK2
RefSeq (mRNA)	NM_018686	NM_009908
RefSeq (protein)	NP_061156	NP_034038
Location (UCSC)	n/a	Chr 6: 142.7 – 142.72 Mb
PubMed search
- Wikidata
View/Edit Human	View/Edit Mouse

N-acylneuraminate cytidylyltransferase is an enzyme that in humans is encoded by the CMAS gene.

== Function ==
The enzyme encoded by this gene catalyzes the activation of Neu5Ac to Cytidine 5-prime-monophosphate N-acetylneuraminic acid (CMP-Neu5Ac), which provides the substrate required for the addition of sialic acid. Sialic acids of cell surface glycoproteins and glycolipids play a pivotal role in the structure and function of animal tissues. The pattern of cell surface sialylation is highly regulated during embryonic development, and changes with stages of differentiation. Studies of a similar murine protein suggest that this protein localizes to the nucleus.
