= Canadian Motorcycle Association =

- Sport: Motorcycling
- Abbreviation: CMA
- Founded: 1946
- Affiliation: FIM
- Affiliation date: 1950
- Headquarters: Hamilton, Ontario, Canada

Official website
- www.motorcyclingcanada.ca
- (Canada)

The Canadian Motorcycle Association (CMA; French: Association Canadienne des Motocycles, ACM) was founded in 1946. In 1950, it became affiliated with the World Governing Body of the Federation Internationale de Motocyclisme.

== History ==
The Canadian Motorcycle Association (CMA) was founded in 1946 and became affiliated with the Fédération Internationale de Motocyclisme in 1950. It was later incorporated federally as a not-for-profit organization in 1957. Early CMA-sanctioned competition included trials and road racing; the CMA records the first Canadian trials championship in 1949.

== Governance and membership ==
As of 2025, the CMA is headquartered in Hamilton, Ontario, and lists Lee Fryberger as president, A. Ross de St. Croix as chief executive officer, and Holly Ralph as secretary general.

== Activities and competition ==
The CMA sanctions and administers motorcycle sport in Canada across multiple disciplines, including trials. CMA-licensed riders regularly participate in FIM and FIM North America events, with the CMA organizing national team entries for international competitions such as the International Six Days Enduro and the Trial des Nations. Within the CONU framework, member federations issue licenses that allow riders to compete in FIM North America events and in other continental unions worldwide.

== Recognition ==
In 2006 the Canadian Motorcycle Association was inducted into the Canadian Motorcycle Hall of Fame for its role in developing motorcycle sport nationally.
