= Alameda County Transportation Commission =

The Alameda County Transportation Commission (abbreviated as ACTC or as Alameda CTC) is a government agency responsible for planning of county-wide transportation efforts, allocating of funding to street, highway, bicycle, pedestrian, and transit programs, and management of select construction projects across Alameda County, California.

Alameda CTC is a joint powers authority and a congestion management agency.

== Planning initiatives ==
Current planning initiatives include redesigning surface arterial roads that run the length of the county such as San Pablo Avenue and East 14th Street.

== Funding ==
Alameda CTC is responsible for administering and distributing funds from a voter-approved sales tax (Measure BB, 2014). Other local sources of funds administered by the commission include a voter-approved vehicle registration fee (Measure F, 2010).

The commission is also responsible for helping to allocate and distribute regional, state, and federal transportation funds in collaboration with the Bay Area-wide Metropolitan Transportation Commission.

== Projects and programs ==
Alameda CTC also funds and operates the Alameda County Safe Routes to School program.

Current capital projects constructed and managed by Alameda CTC include high-occupancy toll lanes along I-680 and I-580.

Alameda CTC uses Measure BB sales tax funds to augment and extend funding for the operation of transit service in the county. Transit service operators utilizing these funds include AC Transit, Altamont Corridor Express, BART, WHEELS, WETA, Union City Transit, and the proposed Valley Link.

== See also ==
- Metropolitan Transportation Commission
