= San Francisco County Transportation Authority =

Transportation agency in California

San Francisco County Transportation Authority (SFCTA)

Agency overview
- Formed: 1990
- Jurisdiction: San Francisco County
- Headquarters: 1455 Market Street, 22nd Floor, San Francisco, CA 94103
- Employees: 39
- Agency executives: Mryna Melgar, Chair; Tilly Chang, Executive Director
- Website: http://www.sfcta.org

The San Francisco County Transportation Authority (SFCTA) is a state chartered sub-regional transportation planning and programming agency for San Francisco County. SFCTA is a separate legal entity from the San Francisco Municipal Transportation Agency, the Metropolitan Transportation Commission, and other transportation agencies in the San Francisco area, with its own administrative structure, policies, staff, budget, and with separate borrowing capacity. The Authority Board consists of the eleven members of the San Francisco Board of Supervisors (ex officio).

The Authority was originally created to administer the proceeds of San Francisco's first local sales tax for transportation, which began in 1990 and was passed by voters in 1989 as Proposition B. Since then, the agency has taken additional responsibilities mandated by state law. Beginning in 2004, SFCTA became the administrator of the Proposition K sales tax for transportation approved in November 2003, which substituted the original 1989 tax. The 2003 Proposition K is a half cent local transportation sales tax program.

Since 1990, the Authority has also been the designated Congestion Management Agency (CMA) for San Francisco, and has also served as the San Francisco Program Manager for grants from the Transportation Fund for Clean Air (TFCA). In the role of CMA, the agency has been responsible for developing and administering the Congestion Management Program (CMP). As part of its responsibilities, the Authority leverages state and federal transportation funds and grants to complement the revenues collected from the tax for transportation. The Authority also monitors transportation system performance to ensure that San Francisco gets a good economic return from its transportation investments. SFCTA also prepares a long-term Countywide Transportation Plan to guide future investment decisions. As program manager for the TCFA, the Authority approves funding for transportation projects that directly benefit air quality by reducing motor vehicle emissions.

Since 2013, the executive director of the SFCTA is Tilly Chang, who was previously the deputy director. Previous executive directors include José Luis Moscovich, Andrew Nash, Carmen Clark and Brigid Hynes-Cherin.
