= Catchment Management Authority (New South Wales) =

Catchment Management Authorities were responsible for the management of water catchments in the state of New South Wales, Australia until 2013.

- Border Rivers-Gwydir Catchment Management Authority
- Central West Catchment Management Authority
- Hawkesbury-Nepean Catchment Management Authority
- Hunter-Central Rivers Catchment Management Authority
- Lachlan Catchment Management Authority
- Lower Murray Darling Catchment Management Authority
- Murray Catchment Management Authority
- Murrumbidgee Catchment Management Authority
- Namoi Catchment Management Authority
- Northern Rivers Catchment Management Authority
- Southern Rivers Catchment Management Authority
- Sydney Catchment Authority
- Sydney Metropolitan Catchment Management Authority
- Western Catchment Management Authority

From January 2014, the NSW Government established Local Land Services to replace the CMAs. The eleven Local Land Services Regions are established within the NSW Primary Industries portfolio.

From 10 March 2014, the Sydney Catchment Authority was absorbed into WaterNSW
