= P. aurea =

P. aurea may refer to:

- Pachycephala aurea, the golden-backed whistler, a bird species found in Indonesia and Papua New Guinea
- Paradrymonia aurea, a plant species endemic to Ecuador
- Pentachaeta aurea, the golden-rayed pentachaeta or golden chaetopappa, a flowering plant species endemic to southern California
- Phaeolepiota aurea, the golden bootleg or golden cap, a mushroom species found throughout North America and Eurasia
- Phyllostachys aurea, a bamboo species
- Pimpinella aurea, a plant species in the genus Pimpinella
- Pipiza aurea, a hoverfly species in the genus Pipiza
- Pitcairnia aurea, a plant species endemic to Bolivia
- Pleomele aurea, the golden Hala Pepe, a flowering plant species endemic to the island of Kauaʻi in Hawaii
- Protea aurea, the long-bud sugarbush, a shrub or small tree species occurring in mountain fynbos in Sourh Africa

== See also ==
- Aurea (disambiguation)
