= Seal Slough =

Tidal canal in San Mateo County, California

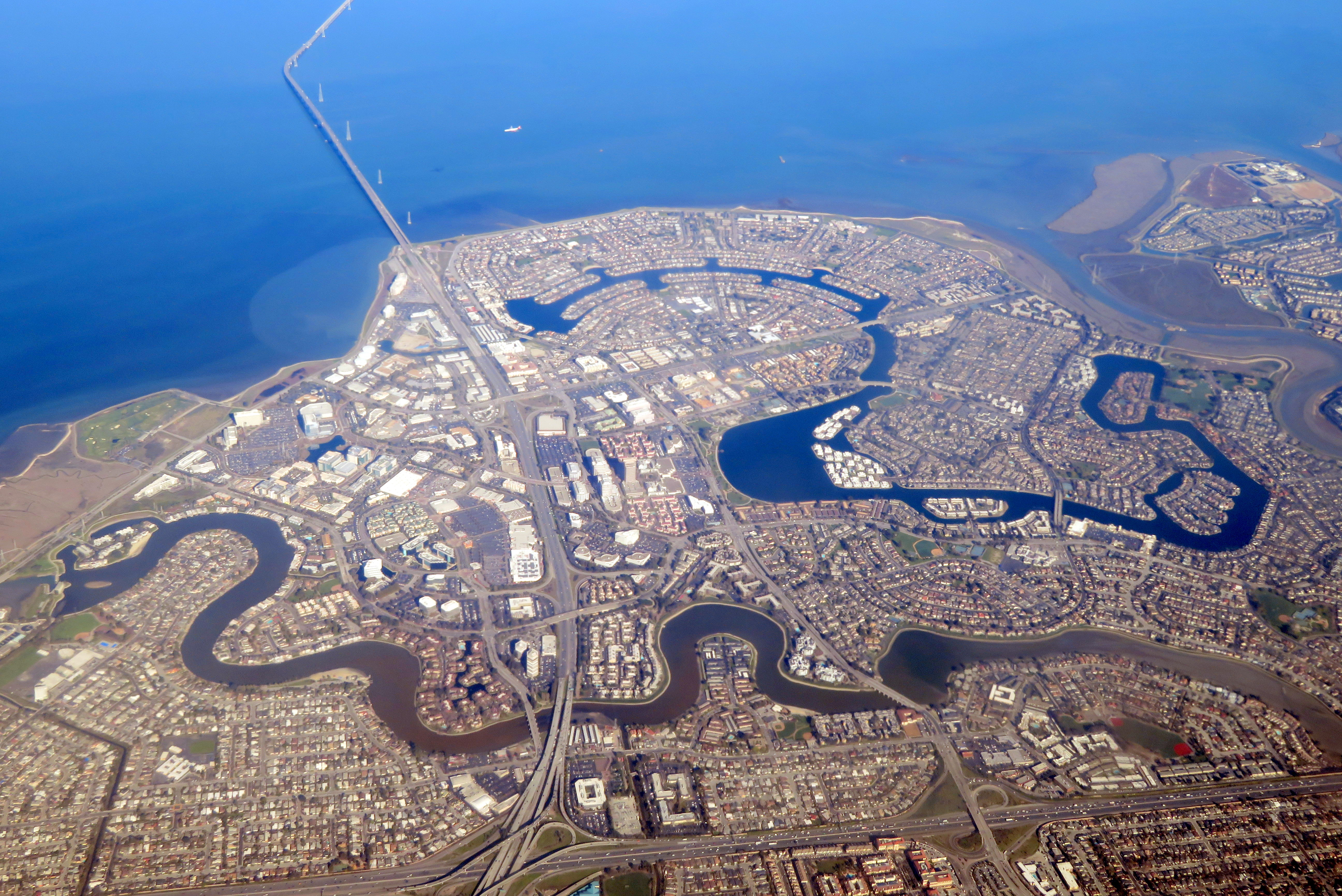
- In this aerial view, facing northwest, serpentine Seal Slough separates San Mateo (west of the Slough, bottom 1/4) and Foster City (east, upper 3/4; the bridges crossing the Slough carry Fashion Island Blvd and SR 92 at center, and Hillsdale Blvd at right.

- Location within San Francisco Bay Area
- Location: San Mateo County, California
- Coordinates: 37°34′15″N 122°17′39″W
- Type: Slough (hydrology)
- Part of: San Francisco Bay
- River sources: Borel Creek, Leslie Creek, Laurel Creek

Seal Slough, also known as Marina Lagoon, is a narrow winding tidal channel through a tidal marsh in San Mateo and Foster City, California. This slough has been the object of a wetland restoration project in recent years to enhance habitat value. Dredging has been carried out in Seal Slough since at least 1954. When the original sewage treatment plant for the city of San Mateo was constructed in 1935, its discharge was directed to Seal Slough.

The marshy area through which Seal Slough meanders is a productive brackish wetland whose dominant flora is cordgrass. There are a number of significant wildlife features associated with Seal Slough, including use by the endangered California clapper rail. A tide gate near the mouth of Seal Slough regulates tidal influx from San Francisco Bay to Marina Lagoon; this flushing action is important to prevent population explosion of midges in the local area.

== Course ==
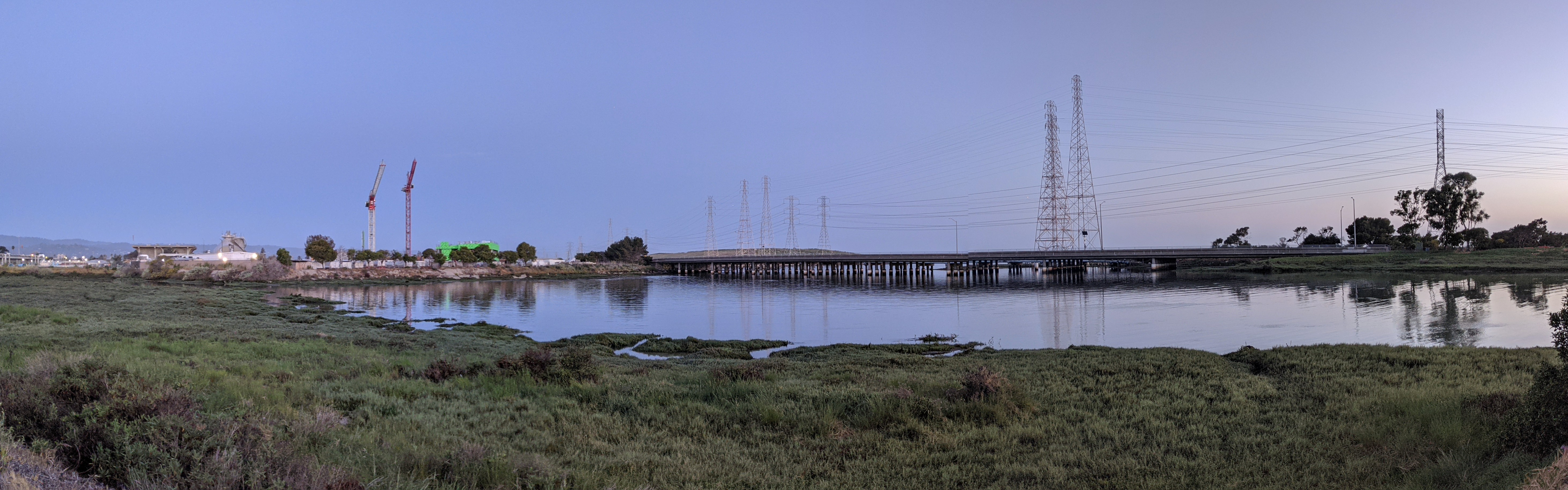
Panorama at the mouth of Seal Slough (2022); road bridges are in the background and construction cranes on the left are being used during the reconstruction of the city wastewater treatment plant.

According to the City of San Mateo, Seal Slough properly refers to just the outlet, where it experiences a tidal exchange with San Francisco Bay on the eastern shoreline of the city of San Mateo, approximately midway between Coyote Point and the San Mateo Bridge. The portion upstream from the mouth is known as Marina Lagoon, which is approximately 300 to 400 ft (91 to 122 m) wide over a serpentine course 4.5 mi (7.2 km) long, representing the area that was diked and dredged starting from 1952 to provide a flood control basin and recreational area. The upstream inlets to Marina Lagoon, east of Hillsdale Boulevard, are O'Neill Slough and Belmont Slough. Officially, the entire waterway is still Seal Slough, as an act of Congress would be required to rename it.

The mouth is characterized by a marshy area and an extent of bay mud extending approximately 700 m (2,300 ft) northward into San Francisco Bay. The mouth is crossed by the Seal Slough Bridge carrying East Third Avenue / J Hart Clinton Drive, completed in 1985, and a narrower, older bridge previously used by the road and now part of the San Francisco Bay Trail. Seal Slough is separated from Marina Lagoon by a small earthen dam, which has tidal gates at the south end, and gravity or pumped flow at the north end. Near the downstream / northern end of Marina Lagoon is situated the city of San Mateo Wastewater Treatment Plant, Bayside School, and Bayside/Joinville Park on the western/southern bank; on the northern/eastern bank is the Mariner's Island residential development. In between, a small island near the dam, accessible by boat, is preserved as Lagoon Island Park.

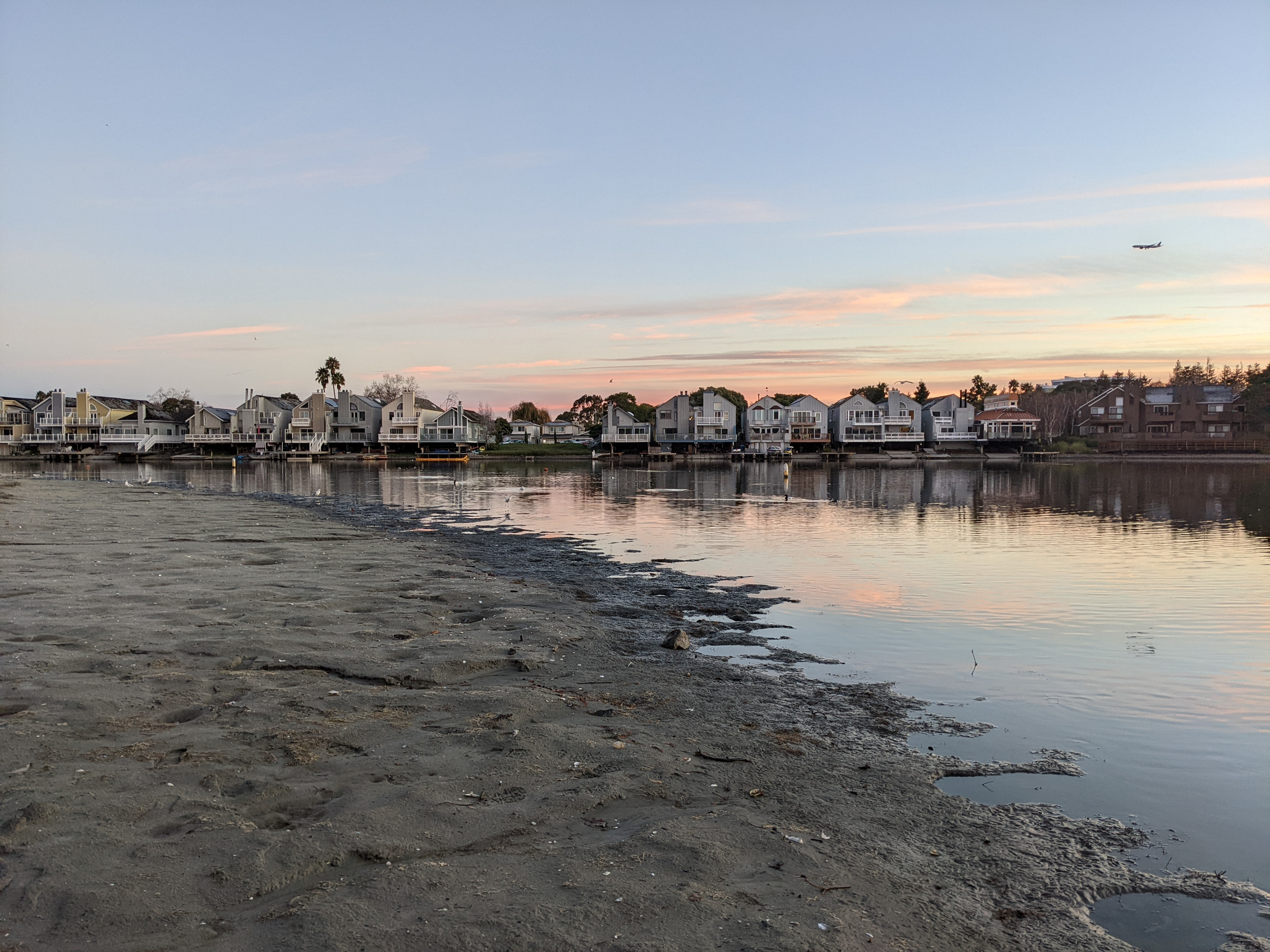
Waterfront homes in Foster City along Seal Slough, from Parkside Aquatic Park in San Mateo (2022)

The course of the slough is highly tortuous as it winds in a generally south-southeast direction. The channelized Leslie and Borel Creeks drain into Marina Lagoon. Further upstream, single-family residential uses have encroached closely on its southern/western banks; in this middle reach it also passes close to and north of Parkside School and Parkside Aquatic Park, approximately opposite from the Fashion Island shopping area. Further to the east it passes beside Lakeshore School and Lakeshore Park before crossing under Hillsdale Boulevard and entering Foster City. In the uppermost reaches, south of Los Prados Park (in San Mateo) and Boothbay Park (in Foster City), O'Neill and Belmont Sloughs drain into Marina Lagoon; O'Neill is channeled under U.S. 101.

== Ecology ==
Much of the information regarding Seal Slough was developed in a 1980 study, in which Caltrans and the city retained Earth Metrics to analyze impacts of a new bridge across Seal Slough at East Third Avenue. The most significant habitat area along Seal Slough is the tidal mouth, where there are three identified plant community zones. The lowest zone is defined by the presence of mudflats and/or the dominant plant cordgrass, distichlis sp. The middle zone is characterized by the dominant plant pickleweed, Salicornia sp., and the upper zone, which is the most disturbed, is characterized by salt grass, Distichlis spicata, and by peripheral halophytes (salt tolerant plants). The pickleweed community thrives primarily on the north banks of Seal Slough. Cordgrass and pickleweed habitats are among the most productive types in the state of California, in each case producing over five tons of organic material per acre per annum. Further these plants supply the adjacent mudflats with detritus that is the basis of estuarine food chains.

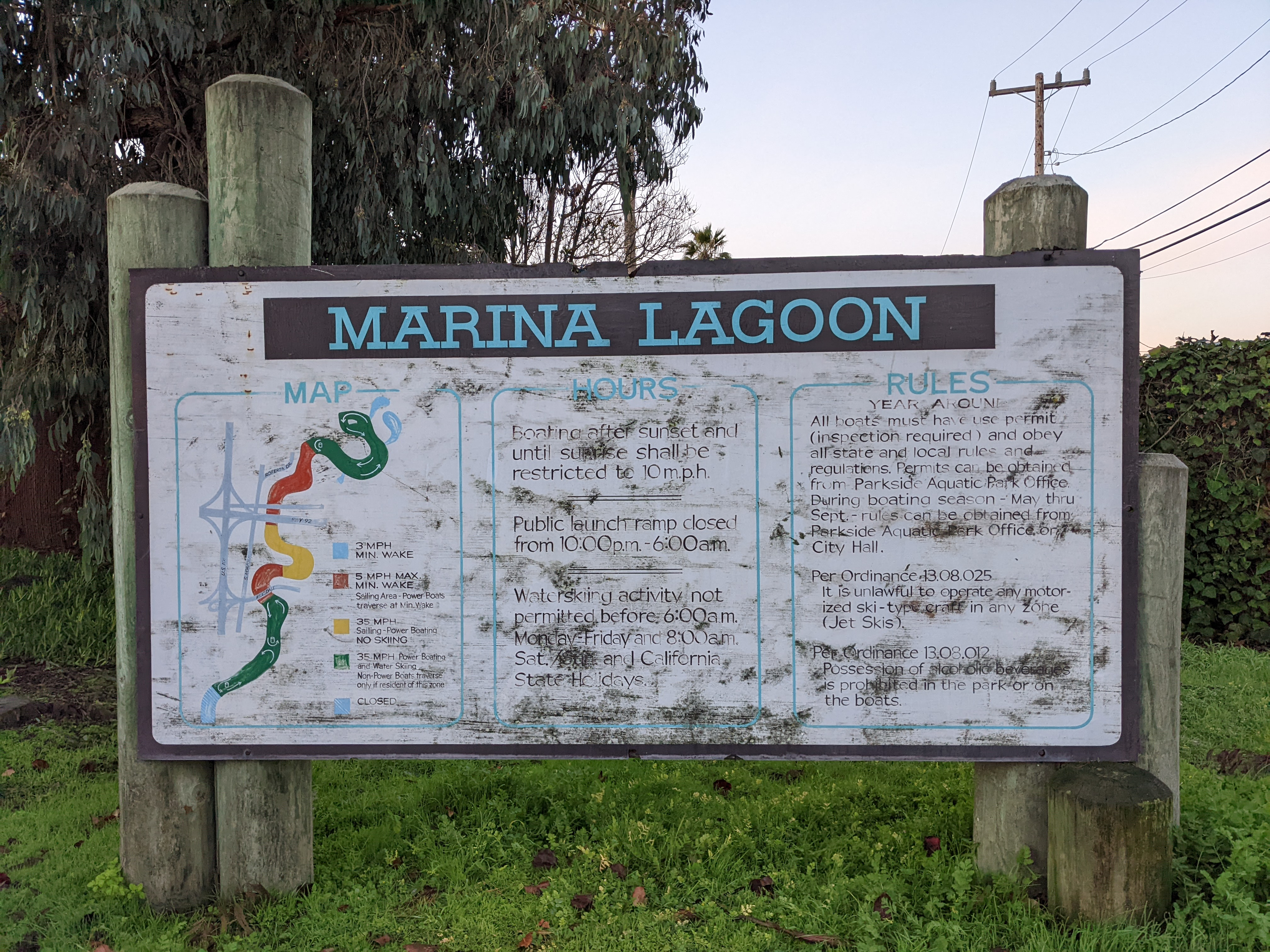
Map of Marina Lagoon at Parkside Aquatic Park (2022)

Cordgrass is also used for food and cover for a multiplicity of waterfowl, including the endangered California clapper rail, which species occurs in Seal Slough. Other avafauna found in this robust wetland include killdeer, mallards and the snowy egret. The Seal Slough mudflats also provide a feeding area at high tides for a variety of fishes including topsmelt, anchovy, bat ray, leopard shark, spiny dogfish, striped bass and longjaw mudsucker.

Colonies of Australian tubeworms (ficopomatus enigmaticus) were discovered on the support columns for SR 92 when the water level was lowered for maintenance. The worms were introduced inadvertently in the 1920s from ship bilge water.

== See also ==
- Salt marsh harvest mouse
