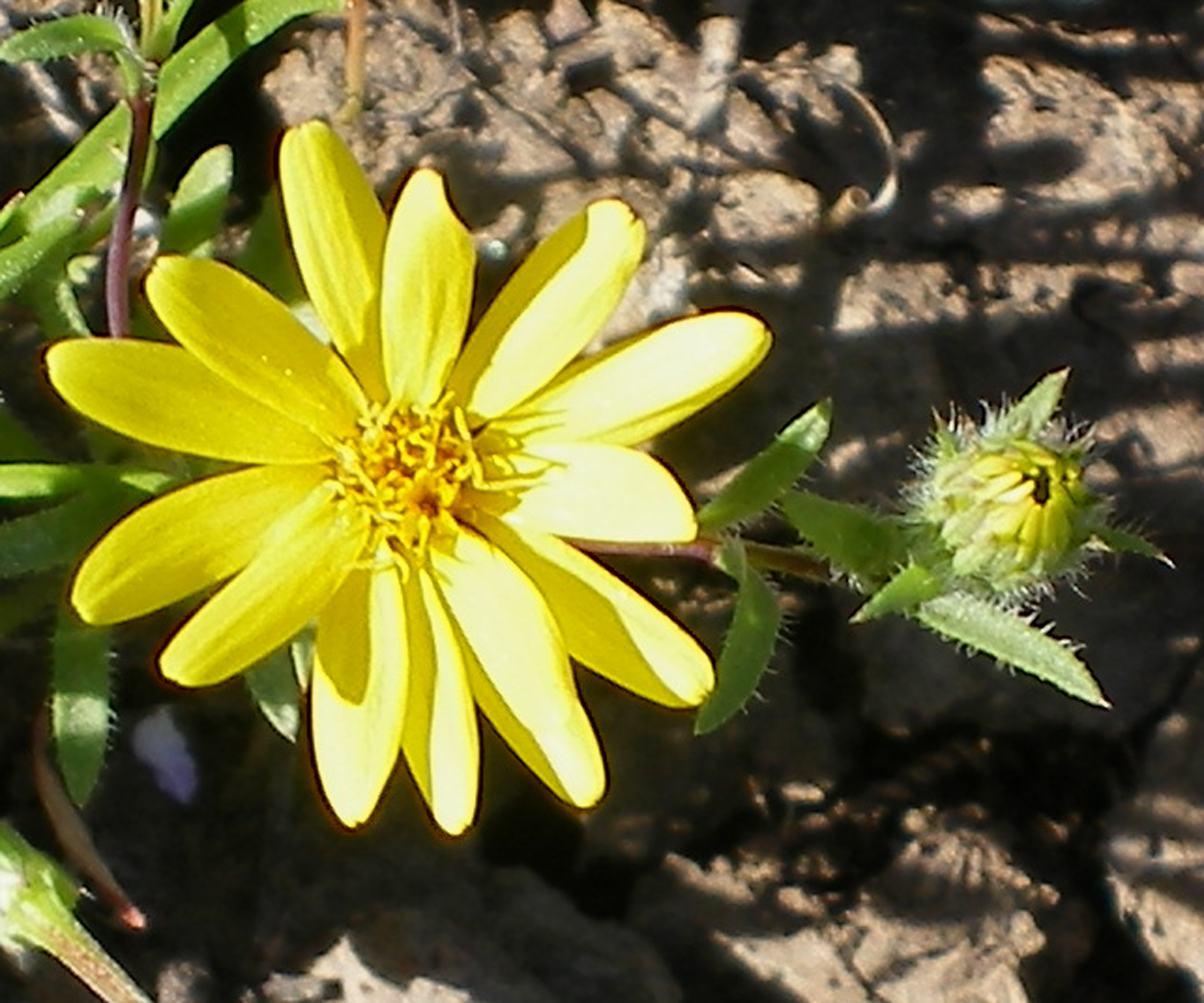

Conservation status
- Endangered (ESA)

Scientific classification
- Kingdom: Plantae
- Clade: Tracheophytes
- Clade: Angiosperms
- Clade: Eudicots
- Clade: Asterids
- Order: Asterales
- Family: Asteraceae
- Genus: Pentachaeta
- Species: P. lyonii

Binomial name
- Pentachaeta lyonii A.Gray

= Pentachaeta lyonii =

Species of flowering plant

Pentachaeta lyonii, the Lyon's pentachaeta or Lyon's pygmydaisy, is an annual plant in the family Asteraceae. It is endemic to southern California, where it is now known only from a few areas on the heavily developed coastline of Los Angeles and Ventura counties. It is a federally listed endangered species.

== Distribution ==
At one point in time there were 43 populations of P. lyonii distributed among the Santa Monica Mountains, Simi Valley, Palos Verdes Peninsula and Catalina Island. In a 2006 search only 21 Pentacheata populations could be located, with occurrences on the Palos Verdes Peninsula having long been deemed extirpated. Populations on Catalina Island were thought to be extirpated until 112 individuals were re-discovered in 2011 on a ridgeline near Two Harbors. The most recent area suspected of extirpation is Stunt Ranch where no flowering individuals have been seen since 1990, after an 8-year population decline.

In 2020 this elusive species was spotted once again by Catalina Island Conservancy botanists. Just 19 individuals were found in a location that roughly corresponds to a record from W.S. Lyon, who discovered the species in 1885.

The plant received protected status in 1990.

== Description ==
Pentachaeta lyonii tends to grow in compact soil with little disturbance and few competitors. Plants have been grown in the greenhouse with light well aerated soil, but whether P. lyonii grows in compact soil due to a lack of competition or particular nutrient requirements has yet to be determined. The plant requires insect pollination to set seed.
