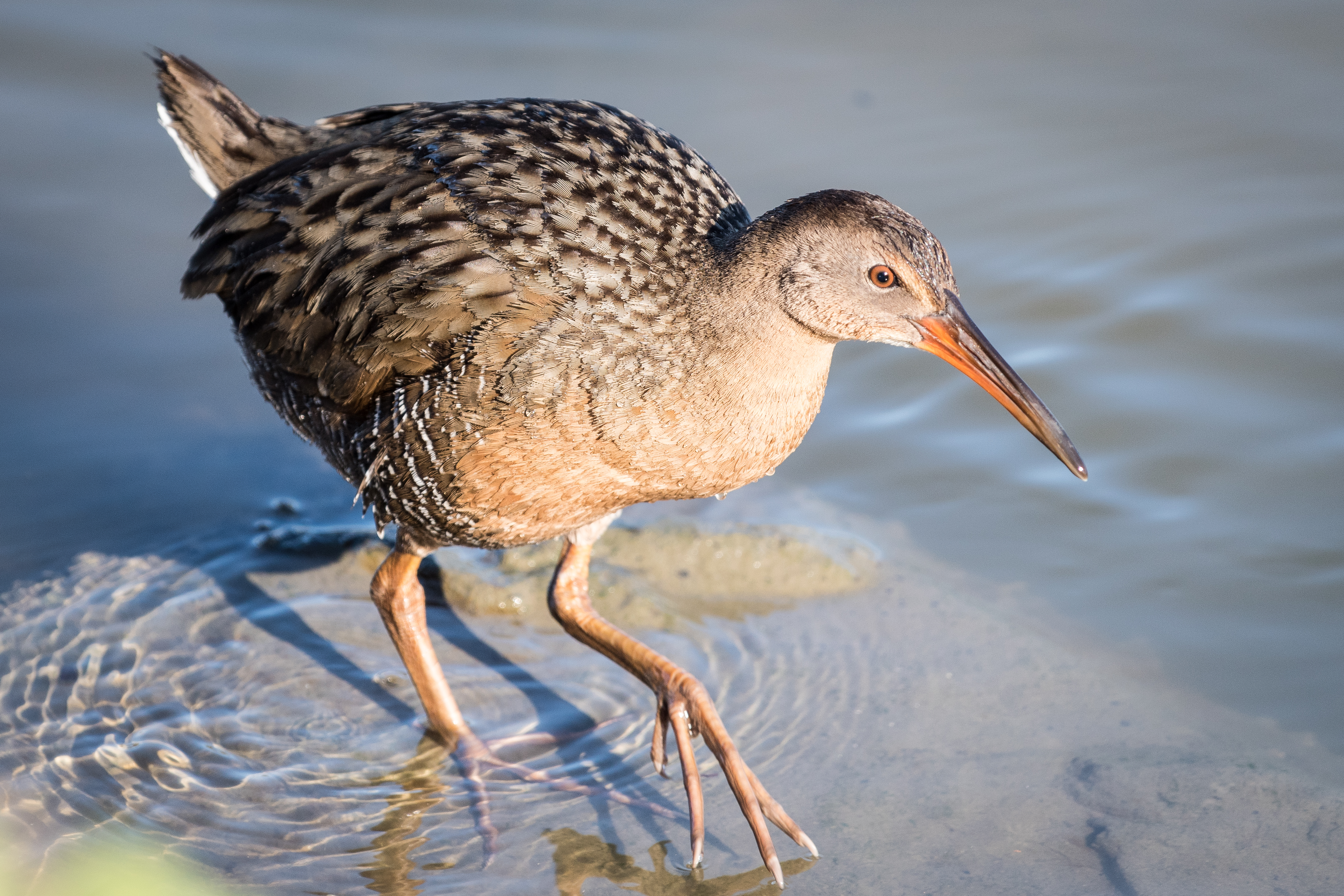

Conservation status
- Near Threatened (IUCN 3.1)

Scientific classification
- Kingdom: Animalia
- Phylum: Chordata
- Class: Aves
- Order: Gruiformes
- Family: Rallidae
- Genus: Rallus
- Species: R. obsoletus

Binomial name
- Rallus obsoletus Ridgway, 1874

Synonyms
- Rallus longirostris obsoletus Rallus crepitans obsoletus

= Ridgway's rail =

Species of bird

Ridgway's rail (Rallus obsoletus) is a species of bird found principally along the Pacific coast of North America from the San Francisco Bay Area to southern Baja California, as well as in some regions of the Gulf of California. A member of the rail family, Rallidae, it is a large cinnamon-brown rail that lives in brackish tidal marshes and rarely flies. Its name commemorates American ornithologist Robert Ridgway.

This species is closely related to the clapper rail, and until recently was considered a subspecies. It has a long, downward curving bill and is grayish brown with a pale chestnut breast and conspicuous whitish rump patch. It is most active nocturnally and crepuscularly.

== Description ==
Typically cinnamon-brown in color, it is darker in coloration on the back. Adult coloration is variable, with several color morphs. The total length in adults is 32–41 cm (13–16 in), and weight ranges 160–470 g (5.6–16.6 oz). Males are about 20% larger than females. Size can vary by geographical location. Hatchlings are covered in black downy feathers.

== Habitat ==
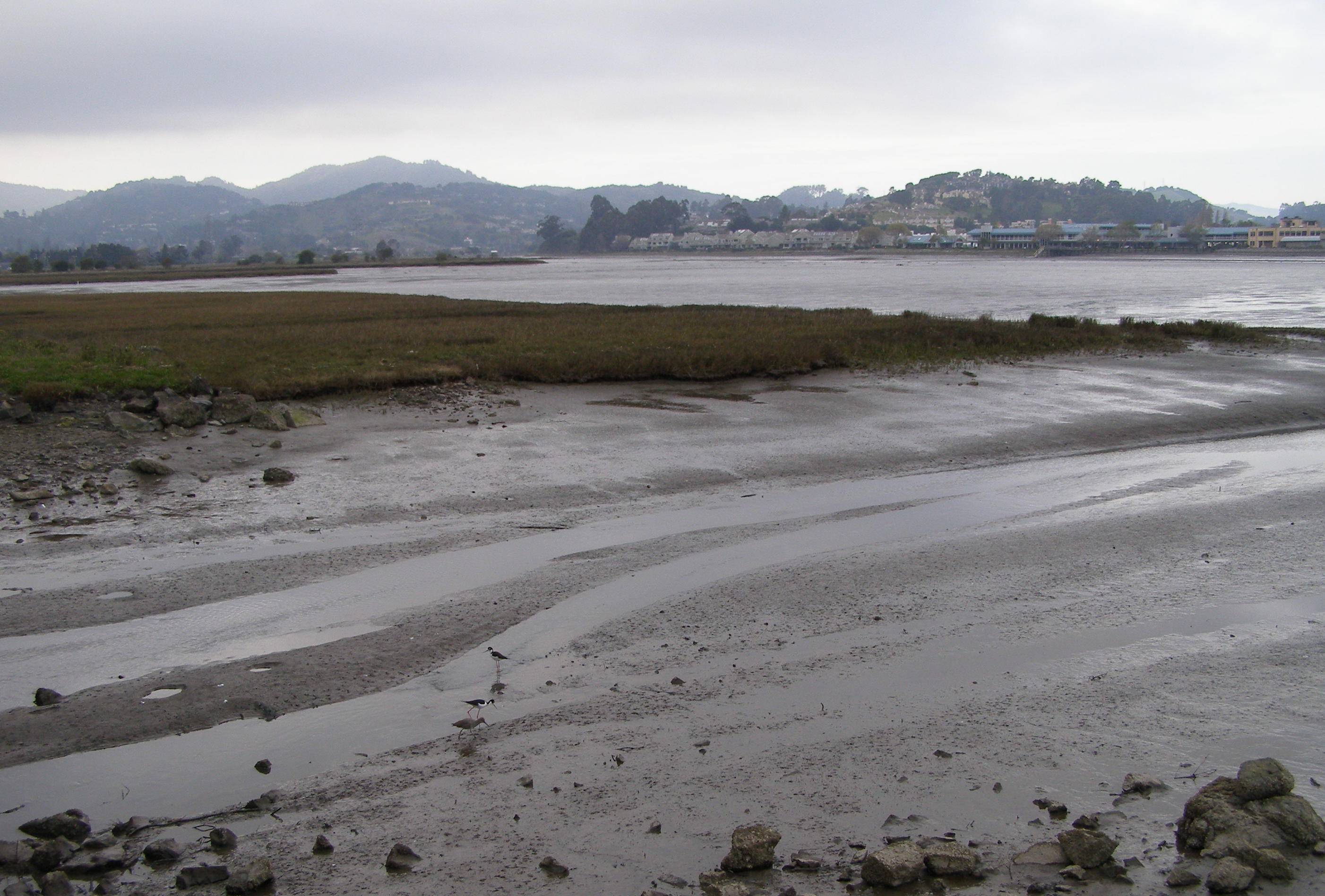
Pickleweed Creek, the upper arm of Richardson Bay looking toward Bothin Marsh

Ridgway's rail forages along the ecotone between mudflat and higher vegetated zones and in tidal sloughs. Mussels, clams, arthropods, snails, worms and small fish are its preferred foods, which it retrieves by probing and scavenging the surface while walking. The bird will only forage on mudflats or very shallow water where there is taller plant material nearby to provide protection at high tide. At such high tides it may also prey upon mice, and has been known to scavenge dead fish.

One of the largest populations of Ridgway's rails is in San Francisco Bay, where about 1,100 are resident. In the past, however, its geographic range spanned more than 90% of the range of the San Francisco Bay. Other frequent sightings of this species around the San Francisco Bay include the Napa Sonoma Marsh, Bothin Marsh in Mill Valley, Gallinas Creek in San Rafael, Arrowhead Marsh and Damon Marsh in Oakland, the Palo Alto baylands, Charleston Slough in Mountain View, Seal Slough in San Mateo and Belmont Slough.

For cover, Ridgway's rail seeks out emergent wetland dominated by pickleweed and cordgrass, or brackish emergent wetland with those two plants plus bulrush. It is not clear whether it requires any source of fresh water. Although not migratory in coastal wetlands, this species disperses juveniles into freshwater wetlands in late August through October. Ridgway's rail has been observed to forage in or near relatively disturbed areas, leading one to deduce the importance of protecting even numeral marsh areas; for example this species was seen foraging in a small mudflat area within Seal Slough in San Mateo, three miles from the nearest known breeding area in Belmont.

== Feeding and ecology ==
The feeding of Ridgway's rail is highly opportunistic, consuming minnows, small crabs, mussels, crayfish, aquatic insects, seeds, slugs, and occasionally small birds.

== Breeding ==
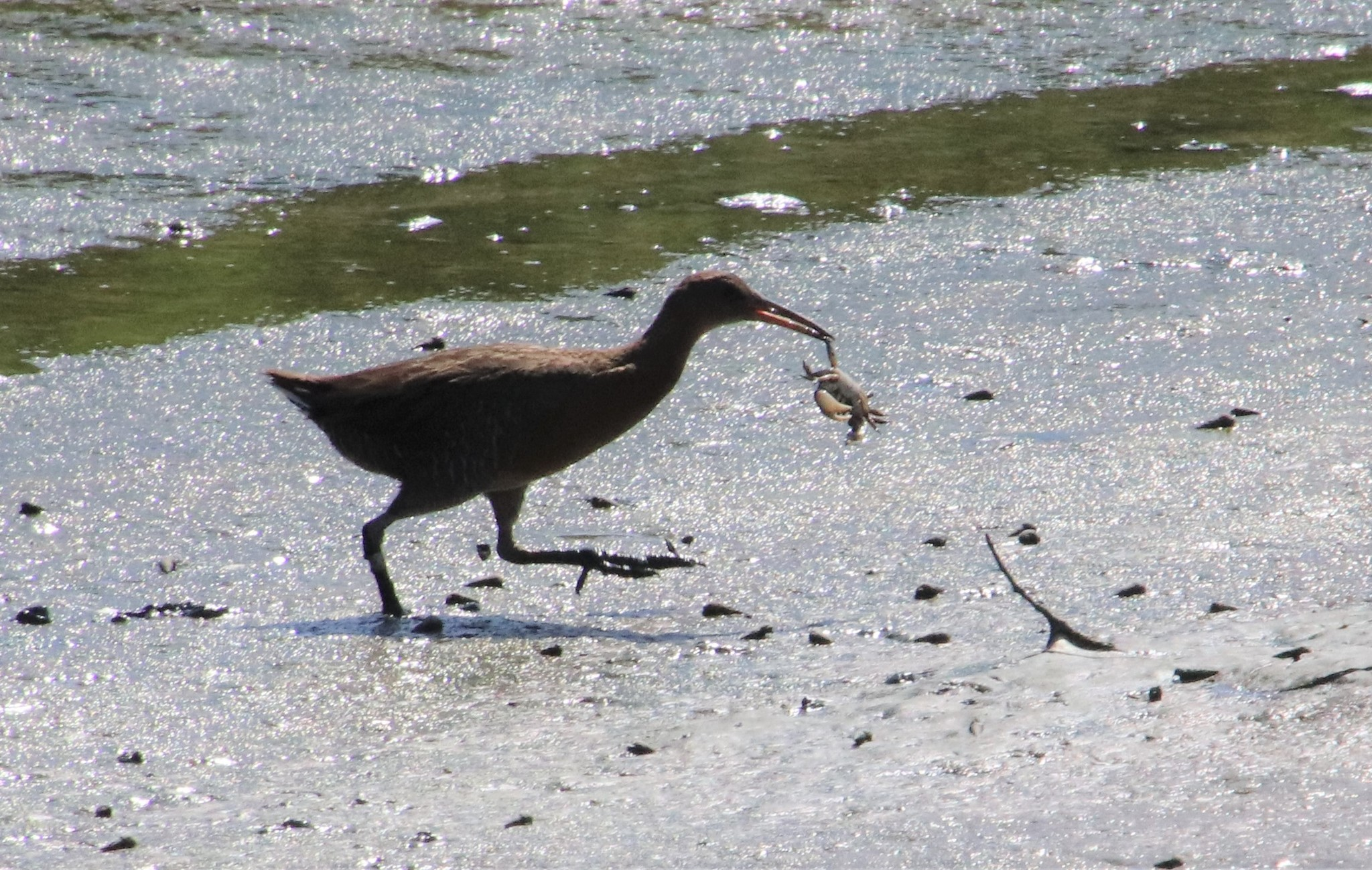
Feeding on a crab

By mid-February, nest building has begun. Ridgway's rail then breeds (California rail subspecies) in the San Francisco Bay from mid-March through August, with peak activity in late June. During this breeding season the bird density was approximately 0.1 to 0.6 individuals per acre; outside of breeding season densities decline to 0.04 to 0.40 individuals per acre. The twig nest is placed low, sometimes among plant roots, and purple-spotted buff eggs are laid. Eggs are produced in clutches of four to fourteen, with an average yield of 7.6. The incubation period is 18 to 29 days, and the hatching success is 38%, notably less than the similar light-footed rail indigenous to southern California. In the San Francisco Bay, the eggs averaged 44.3 mm × 31.5 mm (1.74 in × 1.24 in) in dimensions. Incubation is shared between both the male and female Ridgway's rail. Young hatch semi-precocial.

== Subspecies ==
- R. o. obsoletus, formerly California clapper rail, nominate subspecies
- R. o. levipes, light-footed rail, a U.S. federal and California state listed endangered subspecies that ranges from Santa Barbara County to the extreme north of the Mexican coast of the Pacific Ocean.
- R. o. rhizophorae, coastal salt marshes in northwestern Mexico
- R. o. nayaritensis, western Mexico
- R. o. yumanensis, Yuma rail, a U.S. federal listed endangered subspecies and California state listed threatened and fully protected subspecies that ranges from southeastern California and southern Arizona, to northwestern Mexico
- R. o. beldingi, Belding's rail, southern Baja California
