= Pentachaeta alsinoides =

Scientific classification
- Kingdom: Plantae
- Clade: Tracheophytes
- Clade: Angiosperms
- Clade: Eudicots
- Clade: Asterids
- Order: Asterales
- Family: Asteraceae
- Genus: Pentachaeta
- Species: P. alsinoides

Binomial name
- Pentachaeta alsinoides Greene

Synonyms
- Chaetopappa alsinoides

Species of flowering plant

Pentachaeta alsinoides, the tiny pygmydaisy, is a species of flowering plant in the family Asteraceae endemic to California. It is an annual, low, slender, diffuse, somewhat villous; leaves filiform or nearly so; disk flowers reddish, ray flowers inconspicuous.
