= Pentachaeta exilis =

Scientific classification
- Kingdom: Plantae
- Clade: Tracheophytes
- Clade: Angiosperms
- Clade: Eudicots
- Clade: Asterids
- Order: Asterales
- Family: Asteraceae
- Genus: Pentachaeta
- Species: P. exilis

Binomial name
- Pentachaeta exilis A.Gray

Synonyms
- Chaetopappa exilis

Species of flowering plant

Pentachaeta exilis is a species of flowering plant in the family Asteraceae known by the common name meager pygmydaisy. It is endemic to California, where it is known from the North Coast Ranges to the southern Central Valley, San Joaquin Valley, and Sierra Nevada foothills. It is a member of grassland and woodland plant communities.

== Description ==
Pentachaeta exilis is an annual herb with a hairy stem no more than about 6 centimeters tall. The narrow linear leaves are up to 3 centimeters long but only about a millimeter wide. The inflorescence is a solitary flower head, with up to 23 heads per plant. The two subspecies of the plant have different types of heads. Most individuals of the plant are of subspecies exilis, which has long reddish disc florets in its head but only rudimentary ray florets. The rare subspecies aeolica, which is known from just a few occurrences in the Central Coast Ranges, generally produces some white ray florets around a center of yellow disc florets.
