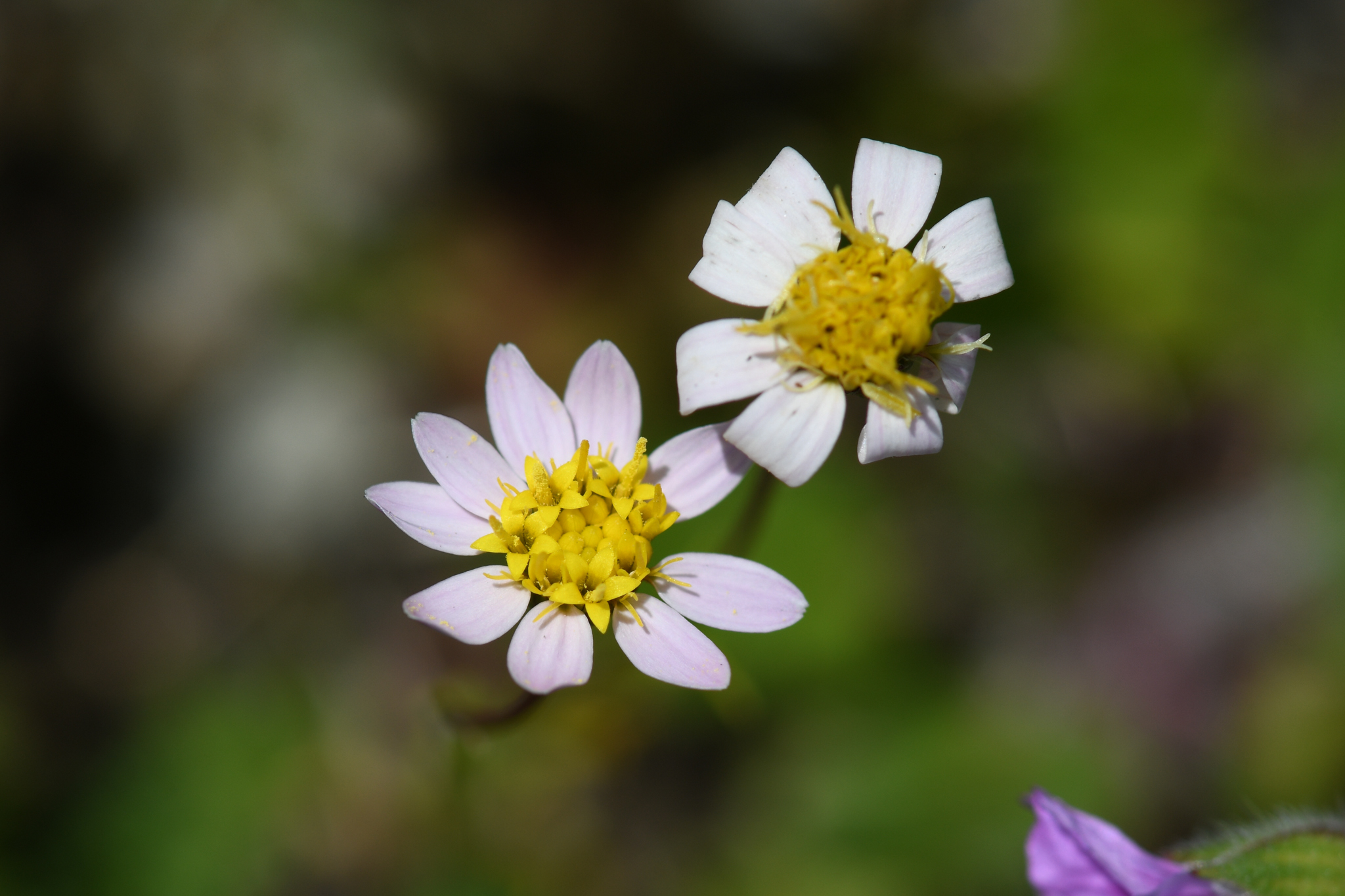

Conservation status
- Critically Imperiled (NatureServe)

Scientific classification
- Kingdom: Plantae
- Clade: Tracheophytes
- Clade: Angiosperms
- Clade: Eudicots
- Clade: Asterids
- Order: Asterales
- Family: Asteraceae
- Genus: Pentachaeta
- Species: P. bellidiflora

Binomial name
- Pentachaeta bellidiflora (Greene) D.D. Keck

Synonyms
- Chaetopappa bellidiflora (Greene) Keck

= Pentachaeta bellidiflora =

Species of flowering plant

Pentachaeta bellidiflora, the white-rayed pentachaeta or whiteray pygmydaisy, is a Californian wildflower in the genus Pentachaeta of the family Asteraceae. It is included in both the state and federal lists of endangered species.

It is endemic to the San Francisco Bay Area of California, United States, and occurs only at altitudes less than 620 metres (2,034 ft). P. bellidiflora is found chiefly on rocky, grassy areas. The conservation status of this species was, as of 1999, characterized by a declining population, with a severely diminished and fragmented range. The specific bellidiflora refers to the similarity of the flowers with those of common daisies (Bellis).

== Description ==
Pentachaeta bellidiflora is a small annual wildflower growing from a slender taproot, which, although it appears smooth, is actually covered by fine hairs. The sparsely hairy stems may number between 6–17 cm (2–7 in) in length and are typically simple, or branching in the lower half of plant. They are erect, generally flexible, and of green to reddish color. White-rayed Pentachaeta leaves are normally narrowly linear, ciliate (fringed with hair) and green, measuring less than 4.5 cm (1.8 in) long and one millimeter wide. Upper and lower leaf surfaces are smooth.

The terminal inflorescences number four or five solitary, roughly circular heads per plant. Peduncles are wispy, with bell-shaped involucres measuring 3 to 7 millimeters, and they range from glabrous to short-haired. Like all of its genus, P. bellidiflora has green phyllaries in two to three generally equal series, lanceolate to obovate, with margins widely scarious (dry and membranous), and a naked receptacle. The yellow corollas are five-lobed, and each of the 16 to 38 disk shaped florets (per head) has linear, acute style tips. They may be slightly red-tinged underneath. Fruits are 1.5 to 3.0 millimeters in diameter and are generally compressed in an oblong to fusiform shape; they are typically covered with small hairs. The plant presents fragile pappuses with five or fewer slender bristles, slightly expanded at the base. Flowering season ranges from late March until late June. From a chromosomal standpoint, the species is diploid, (contains one set of chromosomes from each parent), and has 2n=18.

== Distribution and habitat ==
White-rayed pentachaeta is found in serpentine grassland as well as valley and foothill grassland. It is currently known only to survive in serpentine bunchgrass communities and native prairies in two small areas of San Mateo County, including populations in Edgewood County Park and on San Francisco Water District lands at serpentine outcrops on the eastern slopes of Crystal Springs Reservoir, in the vicinity of State Route 92. It was formerly known to occur from Marin to Santa Cruz counties. One study declares only one population remains. Prior range is defined by the following USGS maps: Soquel (387B)* 3612188, Santa Cruz (387E) 3612281, Castle Rock Ridge (408A)* 3712221, Big Basin (408B)* 3712222, Davenport (408C)* 3712212, Felton (408D)* 3712211, Woodside (429A) 3712243, San Francisco South (448B)* 3712264, Montara Mountain (448C)* 3712254, San Mateo (448D)* 3712253, San Quentin (466B)* 3712284, San Rafael (467A)* 3712285, Point Bonita (467D)*.

== Conservation ==
As of the declaration of Federal endangerment status, the finding of the United States Environmental Protection Agency was that the total species population was sufficiently small and fragmented that it was subject to stochastic extinction. Recent habitat destruction by urban development, off road vehicle use and actions of highway maintenance crews have been responsible for the severe reduction in range and viability of this species.

Population sizes vary from year to year depending on local rainfall and competition from invasive plants. In 1997, P. bellidiflora was the subject of a recovery workshop conducted by the California Department of Fish and Game, where the need for permanently protecting and managing the existing populations, and reintroduction strategies for populations into suitable protected habitat were analyzed. Management and recovery actions for the species have been addressed in the United States Federal Recovery Plan for Serpentine Soil Species of the San Francisco Bay Area, finalized in 1998.

== See also ==
- San Mateo thorn-mint
