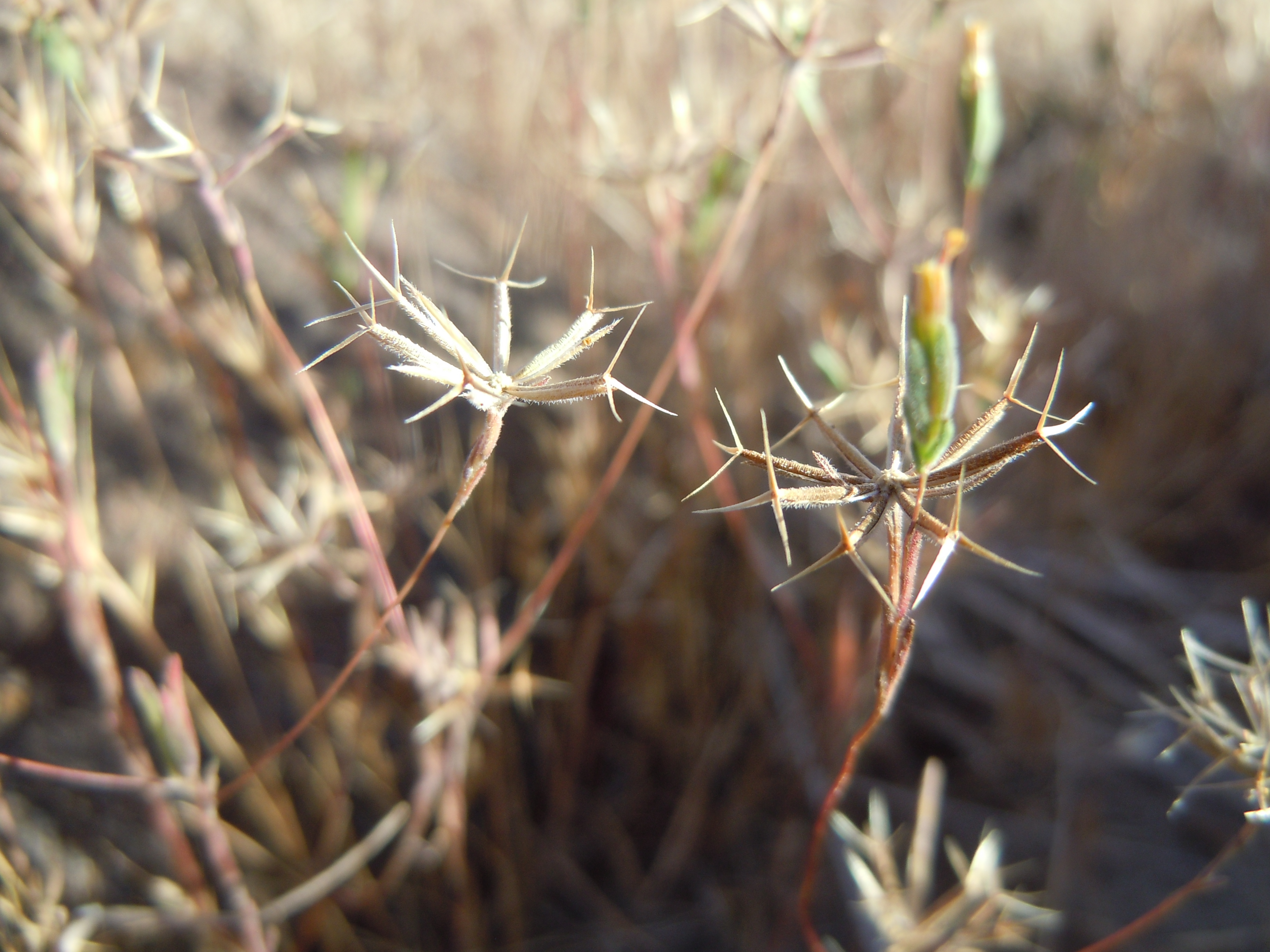

Scientific classification
- Kingdom: Plantae
- Clade: Tracheophytes
- Clade: Angiosperms
- Clade: Eudicots
- Clade: Asterids
- Order: Asterales
- Family: Asteraceae
- Subfamily: Asteroideae
- Tribe: Astereae
- Subtribe: Pentachaetinae
- Genus: Rigiopappus; A.Gray
- Species: R. leptocladus

Binomial name
- Rigiopappus leptocladus A.Gray

= Rigiopappus =

Genus of plants

Rigiopappus is a genus of North American plants in the tribe Astereae within the family Asteraceae. It is closely related to genus Pentachaeta.

The only species is Rigiopappus leptocladus, sometimes known as wireweed. It is an annual plant sending up slender stems terminating in small daisylike yellow flowers. It is native to the western United States (California, Nevada, Oregon, Washington, Idaho).
