= California State Route 92 =

Highway in California

State Route 92
- SR 92 highlighted in red

Route information
- Maintained by Caltrans
- Length: 26.2 mi (42.2 km) Part of SR 92 from Santa Clara Street in Hayward to SR 238 was relinquished and is no longer included in the route.
- Existed: 1964–present

Major junctions
- West end: SR 1 in Half Moon Bay
- I-280 near San Mateo; US 101 in San Mateo; I-880 in Hayward
- East end: Santa Clara Street in Hayward

Location
- Country: United States
- State: California
- Counties: San Mateo, Alameda

Highway system
- State highways in California; Interstate; US; State; Scenic; History; Pre‑1964; Unconstructed; Deleted; Freeways
← SR 91	→ SR 94

State Route 92 (SR 92) is a state highway in the U.S. state of California, serving as a major east-west corridor in the San Francisco Bay Area. From its west end at State Route 1 in Half Moon Bay near the coast, it heads east across the San Francisco Peninsula and the San Mateo–Hayward Bridge to downtown Hayward in the East Bay. Though some maps mark SR 92's east end at State Route 185 (Mission Boulevard) and State Route 238 (Foothill Boulevard) in Hayward, control of segments of those three highways were relinquished to the city. SR 92 has interchanges with three freeways: Interstate 280 (Junipero Serra Freeway), U.S. Route 101 (Bayshore Freeway) in or near San Mateo, and Interstate 880 (Nimitz Freeway) in Hayward. It also connects indirectly to Interstates 238 and 580 by way of Foothill Boulevard.

== Route description ==
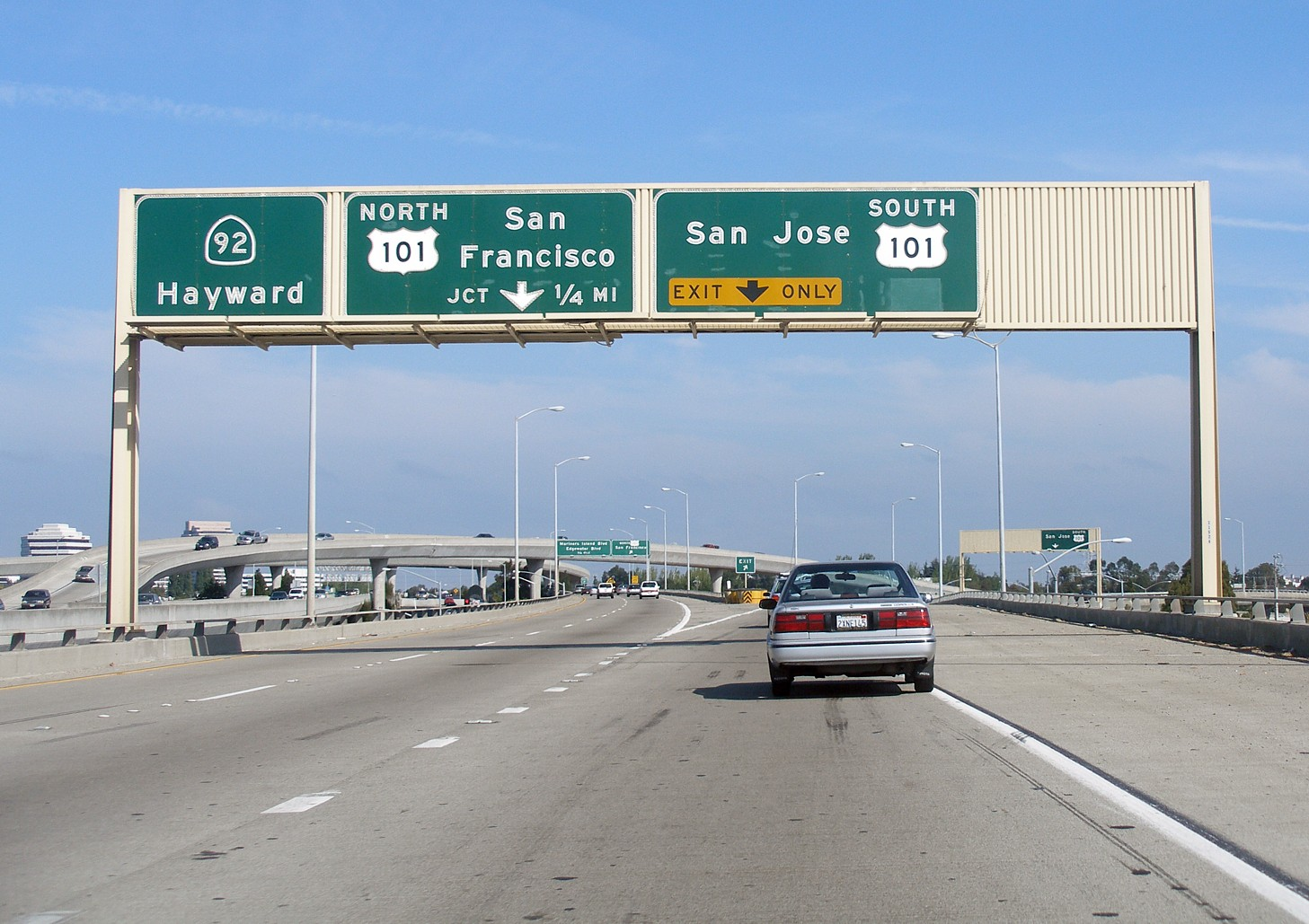
The freeway segment of SR 92 at the US 101 interchange in San Mateo

Route 92 is defined as follows in section 392, subsection (a), of the California Streets and Highways Code, last amended by the California State Legislature in 2016:

Route 92 is from:
(1) Route 1 near Half Moon Bay to Route 280.
(2) Route 280 to Route 238 in Hayward.

Subdivision (b) states that control of the relinquished former eastern segment of Route 92 between near Atherton Street and Mission Boulevard in Hayward is no longer officially part of the state highway system, but the city must still "maintain within its jurisdiction signs directing motorists to the continuation of Route 92 or to the state highway system, as applicable". Subdivision (c) also permits the state to relinquish additional segments within Hayward (which occurred in 2017 when the segment from Santa Clara Street to near Atherton Street was also turned over to the city).

Between Half Moon Bay and Interstate 280, Route 92 winds through the Coast Range as a narrow, mainly undivided two and three lane highway with a switchback turn. The east-bound uphill portion was upgraded with a long passing lane. Between Interstate 280 and Interstate 880 it is entirely a divided multilane highway, including the toll San Mateo-Hayward Bridge, the longest span across the San Francisco Bay; west of that bridge, Route 92 is carried on twin girder bridges across Seal Slough, which forms the border between the cities of San Mateo and Foster City. East of Interstate 880 the route becomes a divided surface street in Hayward, locally known as Jackson Street.

State Route 92 traverses through significant habitat areas including wetland, California oak woodland, chaparral and grassland. In one serpentine soil location near Crystal Springs Reservoir, it passes near one of the only known colonies of the endangered wildflower Pentachaeta bellidiflora and near one of the limited number of colonies of the endangered Eriophyllum latilobum.

SR 92 is part of the California Freeway and Expressway System, and a small portion near SR 1 as well as the entire portion east of I-280 are part of the National Highway System, a network of highways that are considered essential to the country's economy, defense, and mobility by the Federal Highway Administration. SR 92 is eligible for the State Scenic Highway System, but it is not officially designated as a scenic highway by the California Department of Transportation.

Aerial views of SR 92

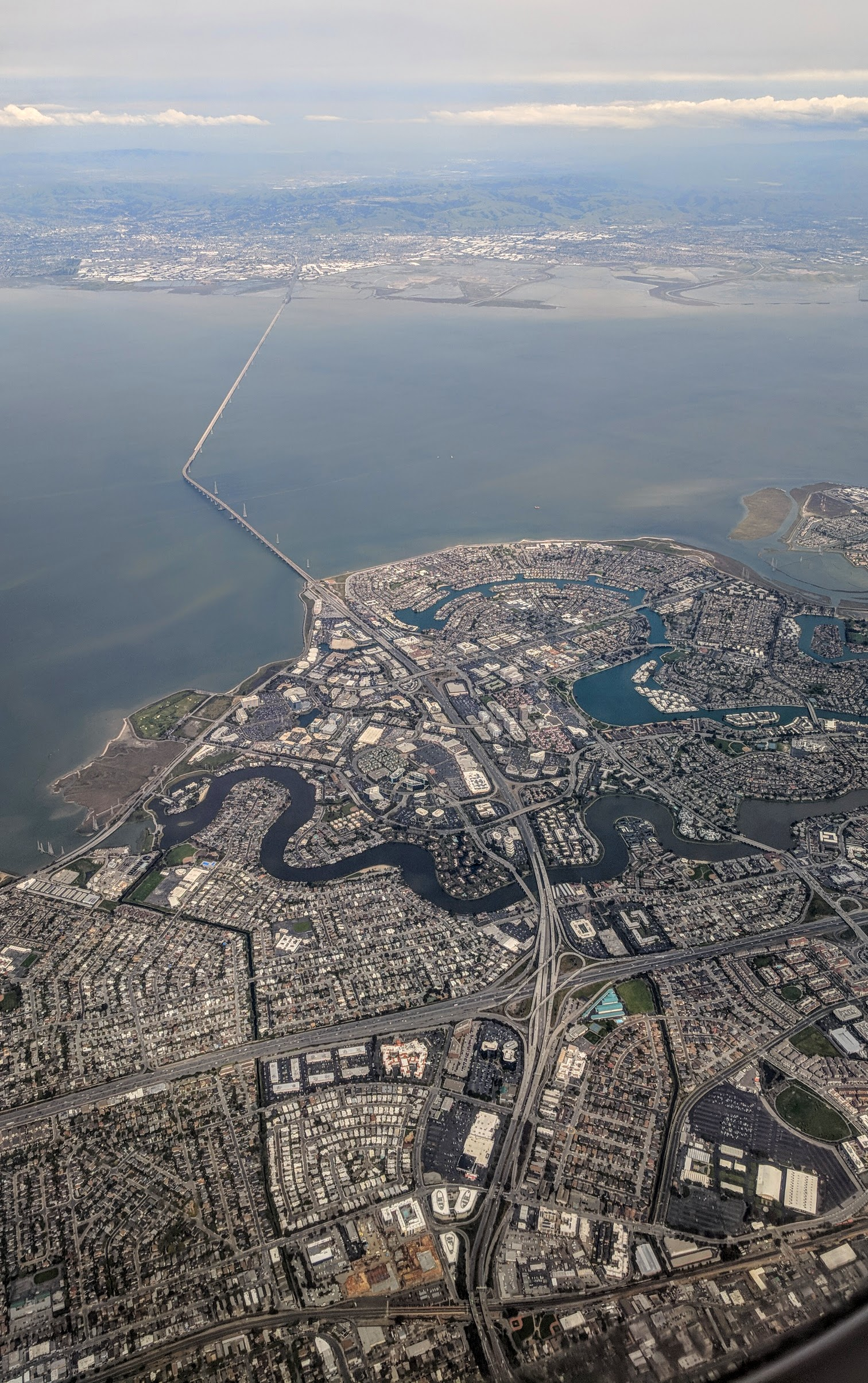
View directed east, showing US 101 interchange, serpentine Seal Slough, and the San Mateo Bridge

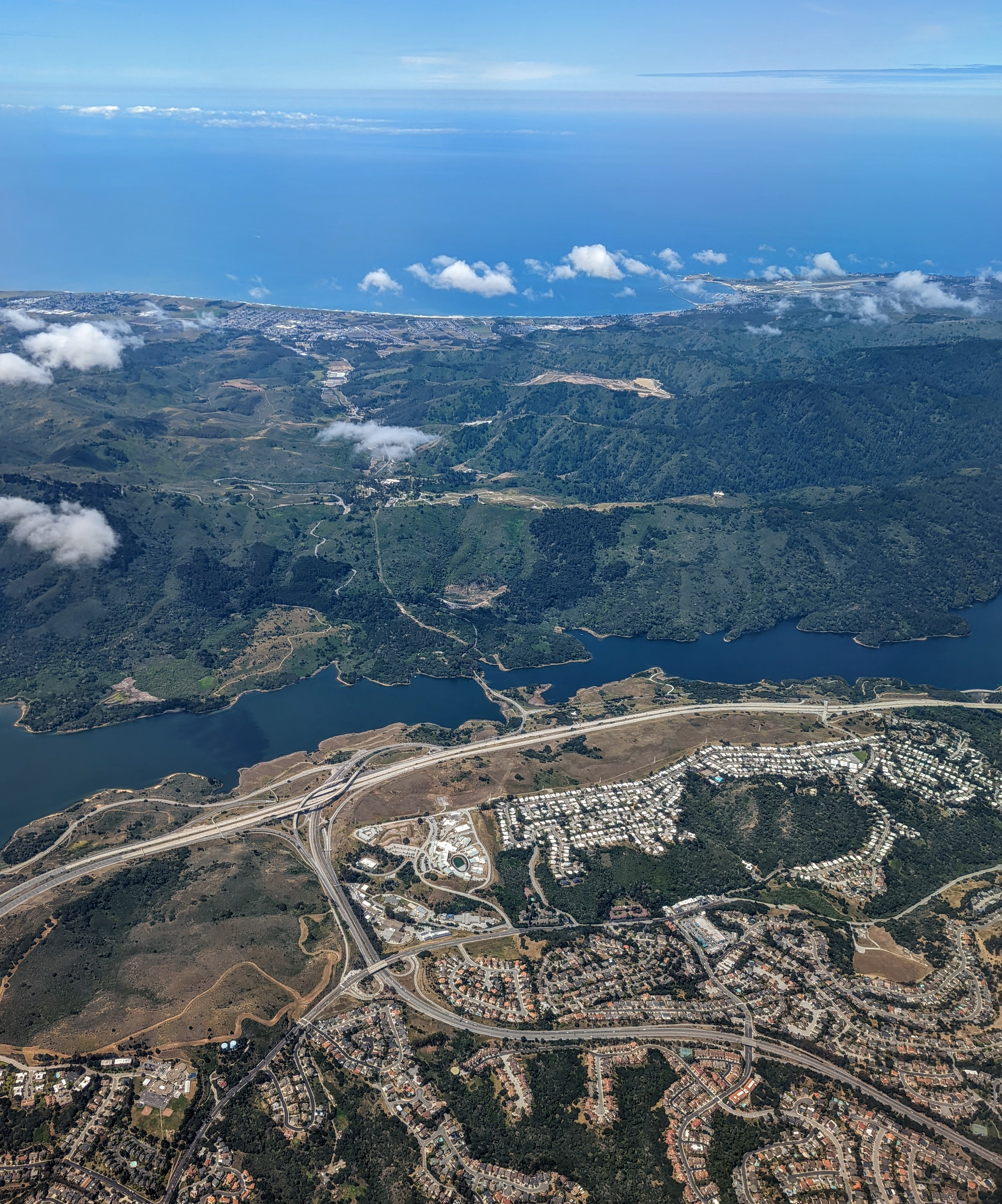
View directed west near interchange with I-280, showing Crystal Springs Reservoir and route from San Mateo to Half Moon Bay

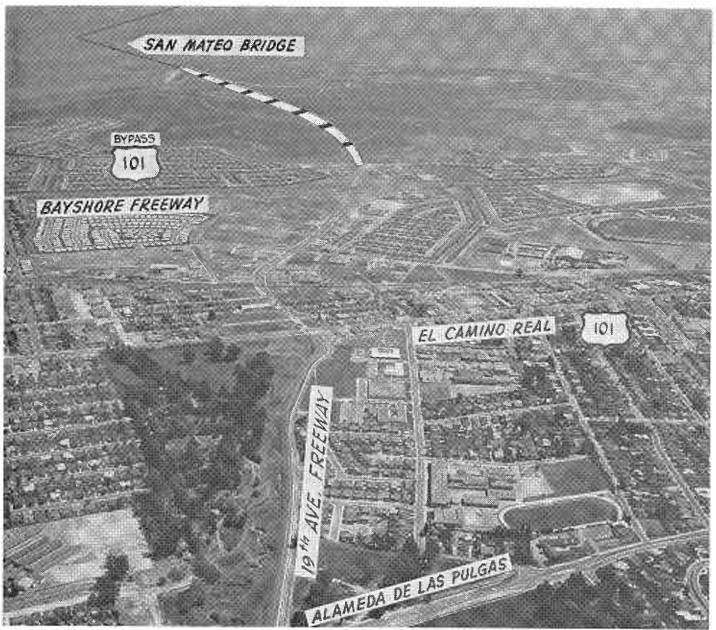
View directed east c. 1962, showing 19th Avenue Freeway segment under construction; the Antoine Borel family estate is the wooded area north (left) of the new freeway

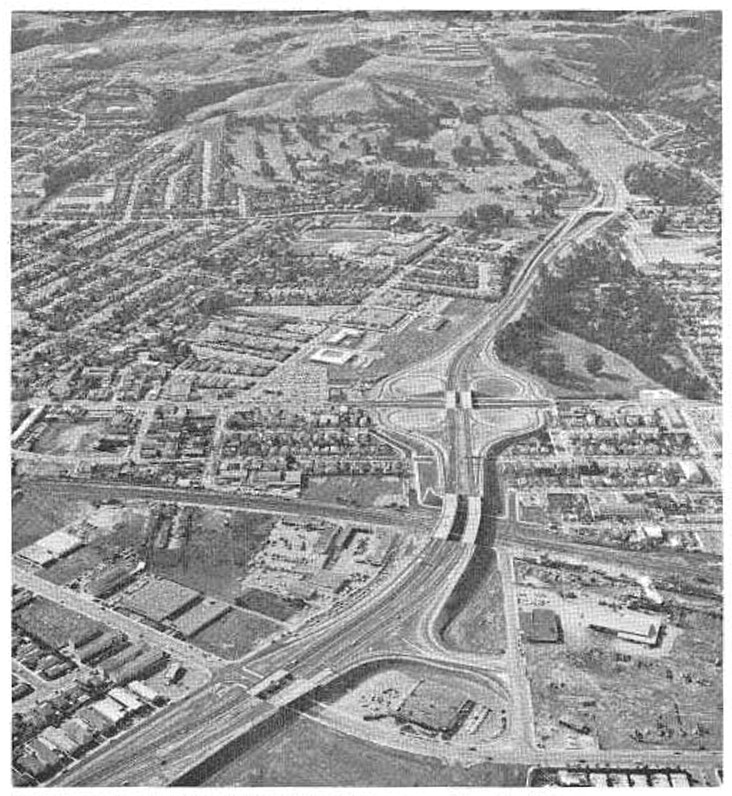
View directed west as-completed c. 1963, showing full cloverleaf interchange with SR 82, center, and bridges over SP's Peninsula Corridor

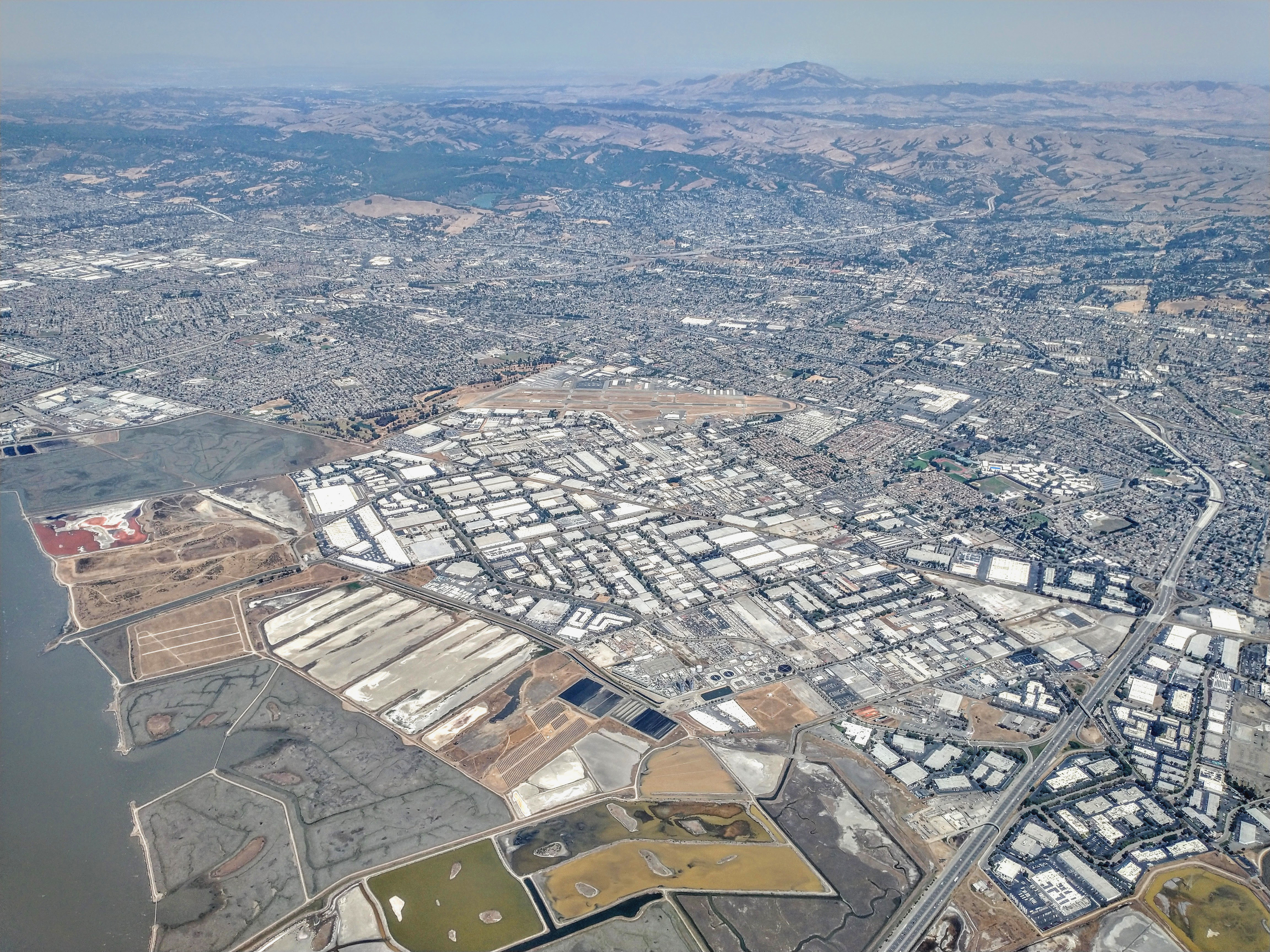
View directed north over Hayward; SR 92 runs along bottom right corner

== History ==
The alignment was designated as Legislative Route Number 105 by Caltrans in 1933.

The San Mateo section also was referred to as the 19th Avenue Freeway which was the street name where the freeway now exists. Parts of the street remain. This section is also known as the J. Arthur Younger Freeway; J. Arthur Younger was a United States representative who served during the 1950s and 60s. On August 29, 1963, the 19th Avenue segment was completed and by 1964, the present name had been adopted; planning began for the segments in Alameda County, east of the San Mateo–Hayward Bridge, and the remainder in San Mateo County, west of Interstate 280.

In 2012, the California Legislature relinquished control of SR 92 between Atherton Street and SR 238 (Mission Boulevard) in Hayward to the city. The segment of the highway from Santa Clara Street to near Atherton Street was also turned over to the city in 2017.

=== Updates ===
An upgrade of the intersection with Main Street in Half Moon Bay, near the western terminus, was scheduled to be completed by fall 2008.

The old cloverleaf interchange with Interstate 880 was converted into a three-level combination interchange with direct ramp replacements for two of the tight "cloverleaf" ramps, and a new wider and taller overpass to carry Route 92 over Interstate 880. The project took four years and was completed in October 2011.

A similar cloverleaf interchange at SR 82 (El Camino Real) was rebuilt in 2018 into a partial cloverleaf interchange. Two of the loop off-ramps from SR 92 were eliminated: from westbound SR 92 to northbound El Camino Real, and from eastbound SR 92 to southbound El Camino Real. The remaining off-ramps were widened and signalized to allow left and right turns onto El Camino Real.

Planning for improvements to the interchange with the Bayshore Freeway (U.S. 101) began in 2018; construction is scheduled to begin in 2024. In addition, a separated bikeway will be built on Fashion Island Boulevard, which largely follows the former alignment of 19th Avenue, connecting the cities of Foster City and San Mateo. This project is scheduled to be completed by the end of 2026.

== Major intersections ==
Except where prefixed with a letter, postmiles were measured on the road as it was in 1964, based on the alignment that existed at the time, and do not necessarily reflect current mileage. Postmile prefixes include: R reflecting a realignment in the route since then, M indicating a second realignment, L referring to an overlap due to a correction or change, and T indicating postmiles classified as temporary. Segments that remain unconstructed or have been relinquished to local control may be omitted. The numbers reset at county lines; the start and end postmiles in each county are given in the county column.

County	Location	Postmile	Exit	Destinations	Notes
San Mateo; SM 0.00-R18.80	Half Moon Bay	0.00		SR 1 – San Francisco, Santa Cruz	Western terminus
San Mateo; SM 0.00-R18.80	Half Moon Bay	0.20		Main Street – Downtown Half Moon Bay	Former SR 1
San Mateo; SM 0.00-R18.80		5.19		SR 35 south (Skyline Boulevard) – Big Basin	West end of SR 35 overlap
San Mateo; SM 0.00-R18.80		7.19		SR 35 north (Skyline Boulevard) – San Francisco	East end of SR 35 overlap
San Mateo; SM 0.00-R18.80			Western end of freeway		
San Mateo; SM 0.00-R18.80		R7.31	8	I-280 (Junipero Serra Freeway) – San Francisco, San Jose	Access from I-280 south to SR 92 west is via SR 35 south; signed as exits 8A (south) and 8B (north) eastbound; I-280 exit 33
San Mateo; SM 0.00-R18.80	San Mateo	R7.93	9A	Ralston Avenue – Belmont	Former Legislative Route 214
San Mateo; SM 0.00-R18.80	San Mateo	R8.67	9B	De Anza Boulevard, Polhemus Road	
San Mateo; SM 0.00-R18.80	San Mateo	R9.38	10	West Hillsdale Boulevard	
San Mateo; SM 0.00-R18.80	San Mateo	R10.56	11	Alameda de las Pulgas	
San Mateo; SM 0.00-R18.80	San Mateo	R11.21	12A	SR 82 (El Camino Real)	Formerly signed as exits 12A (south) and 12B (north)
San Mateo; SM 0.00-R18.80	San Mateo	R11.61	12B	Delaware Street	Formerly signed as exit 12C
San Mateo; SM 0.00-R18.80	San Mateo	R12.14	13A	US 101 south (Bayshore Freeway) – San Jose	US 101 exit 414B
San Mateo; SM 0.00-R18.80	San Mateo	R12.14	13B	US 101 north (Bayshore Freeway) – San Francisco	US 101 exit 414B
San Mateo; SM 0.00-R18.80	Foster City	R12.78	14A	Mariners Island Boulevard, Edgewater Boulevard	
San Mateo; SM 0.00-R18.80	Foster City	R13.61	14B	Foster City Boulevard, East Hillsdale Boulevard	
San Francisco Bay		R14.44– R0.00	San Mateo–Hayward Bridge (westbound toll only)		
Alameda; ALA R0.00-8.22	Hayward	R4.48	24	Clawiter Road, Eden Landing Road	Last free exit for westbound traffic
Alameda; ALA R0.00-8.22	Hayward	R5.12	25A	Industrial Boulevard	
Alameda; ALA R0.00-8.22	Hayward	R5.76	25B	Hesperian Boulevard – San Lorenzo	
Alameda; ALA R0.00-8.22	Hayward	6.39	26A	I-880 south (Nimitz Freeway) – San Jose	I-880 exit 27; former SR 17
Alameda; ALA R0.00-8.22	Hayward	6.39	26B	I-880 north (Nimitz Freeway) – Oakland	I-880 exit 27; former SR 17
Alameda; ALA R0.00-8.22	Hayward		Eastern end of freeway		
Alameda; ALA R0.00-8.22	Hayward	6.78		Santa Clara Street	Eastern end of state maintenance; serves CSU East Bay
Alameda; ALA R0.00-8.22	Hayward	8.22		SR 185 (Mission Boulevard) Foothill Boulevard to I-580	Eastern terminus; access to SR 185 is via a left turn on A Street from Foothill Boulevard north; Foothill Boulevard is relinquished SR 238
1.000 mi = 1.609 km; 1.000 km = 0.621 mi: Concurrency terminus; Electronic toll collection; Incomplete access
