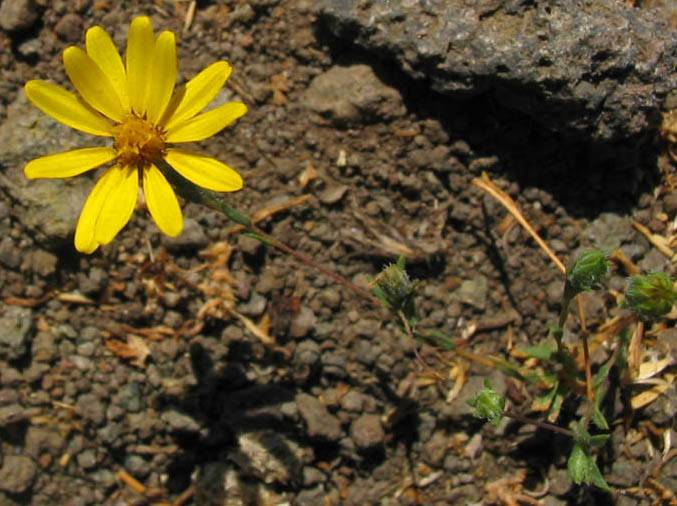
- Pentachaeta bellidiflora

Scientific classification
- Kingdom: Plantae
- Clade: Tracheophytes
- Clade: Angiosperms
- Clade: Eudicots
- Clade: Asterids
- Order: Asterales
- Family: Asteraceae
- Subfamily: Asteroideae
- Tribe: Astereae
- Subtribe: Pentachaetinae
- Genus: Pentachaeta; L.

Species
- Pentachaeta alsinoides; Pentachaeta aurea; Pentachaeta bellidiflora; Pentachaeta exilis; Pentachaeta fragilis; Pentachaeta lyonii

= Pentachaeta =

Genus of flowering plants

Pentachaeta is a genus of the family Asteraceae endemic to California. Of the six species members, at least one, Pentachaeta bellidiflora, is classified as an endangered. The etymology of the genus name derives from Greek penta, meaning five, and chaeta, meaning bristle, referring to the pappus scales of P. aurea. It was formerly included in the genus Chaetopappa, but subsequent taxonomic work has established it as a distinct genus. It is most closely related to Rigiopappus and Tracyina. Pygmydaisy is a common name for Pentachaeta.

== Description ==
This genus consists of annual plants whose above surface architecture emanates from slender taproot, which appears smooth, but actually is covered by fine hairs. The stems are typically simple or branching in the lower half of plant, and they are erect, generally flexible, and of green to reddish color. Pentachaeta leaves are normally narrowly linear, ciliate and green. The terminal inflorescences are solitary with heads radiate, disciform or discoid; peduncles manifest as wispy with bell-shaped involucres measuring three to seven millimeters. This genus has green phyllaries in two to three generally equal series, lanceolate to obovate, with margins widely scarious, and a naked receptacle. The white, yellow or red corolla may be simplified to a tube. The disk shaped flowers manifest linear, acute style tips. Fruits are 1.5 to 3.0 millimeters in diameter and are generally compressed in an oblong-fusiform shape and are typically covered with small hairs. Each species presents fragile pappuses with slender bristles.
