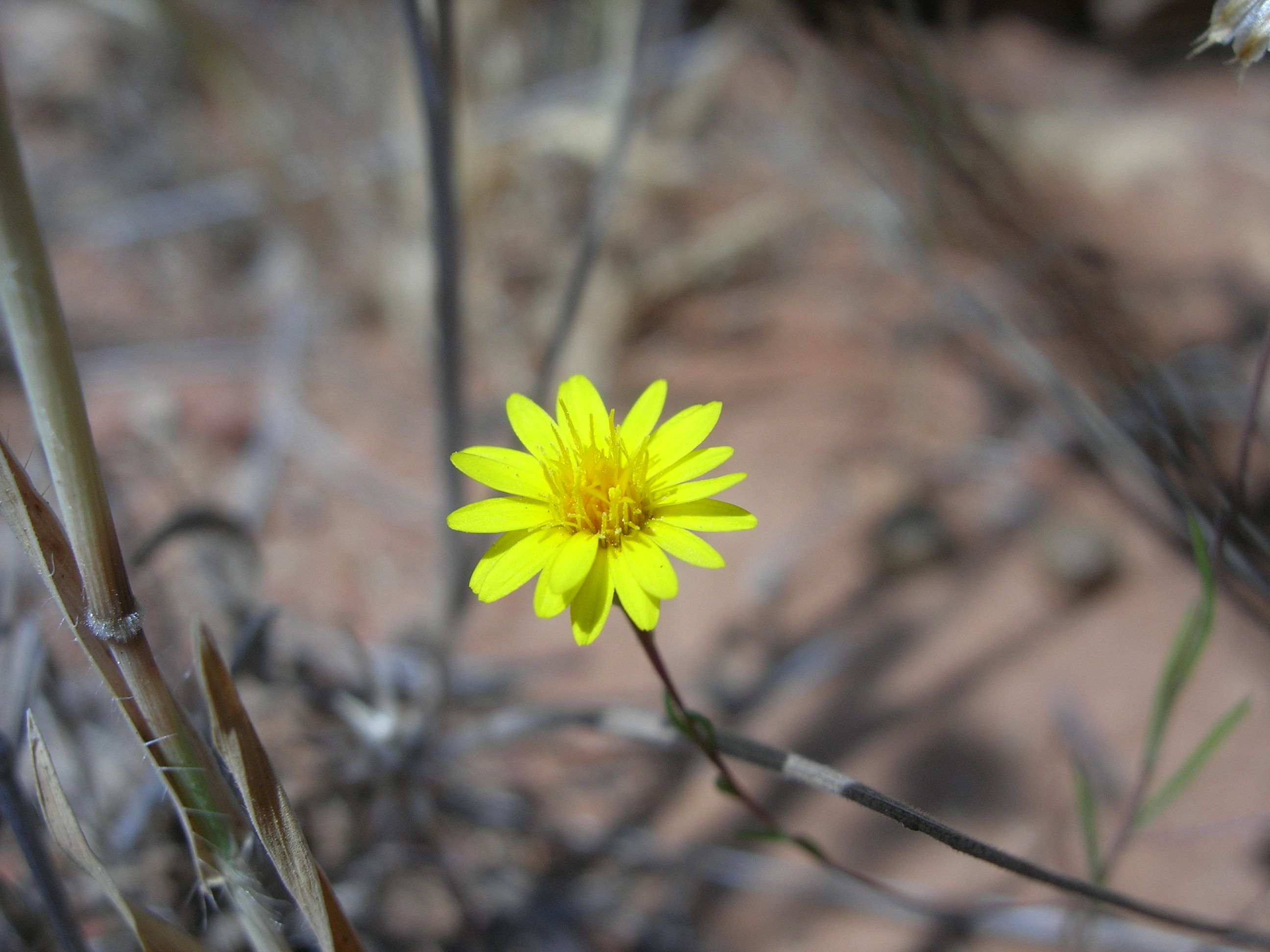
- Pentachaeta aurea subsp. aurea

Conservation status
- Apparently Secure (NatureServe)

Scientific classification
- Kingdom: Plantae
- Clade: Tracheophytes
- Clade: Angiosperms
- Clade: Eudicots
- Clade: Asterids
- Order: Asterales
- Family: Asteraceae
- Genus: Pentachaeta
- Species: P. aurea

Binomial name
- Pentachaeta aurea Nutt.

Synonyms
- Chaetopappa aurea

= Pentachaeta aurea =

Species of flowering plant

Pentachaeta aurea is a species of flowering plant in the aster family known by the common names golden-rayed pentachaeta, golden chaetopappa, and golden leastdaisy. It is native to southern California, where it grows in the San Gabriel and San Bernardino Mountains and the Peninsular Ranges, and northern Baja California. It is an annual herb with a hairy stem reaching a maximum height near 36 centimeters from a slender taproot. The narrow linear leaves are up to 5 centimeters long but only a few millimeters wide and may be very hairy. The inflorescence is a solitary flower head, with up to 22 heads per plant. The flower head bears many yellow, brownish, or whitish ray florets 3 to 12 millimeters long, and has a center of many five-lobed yellow to reddish disc florets. The fruit is an achene tipped with a pappus of bristles.
