= San Mateo–Hayward Bridge =

Road bridge across San Francisco Bay in California, United States

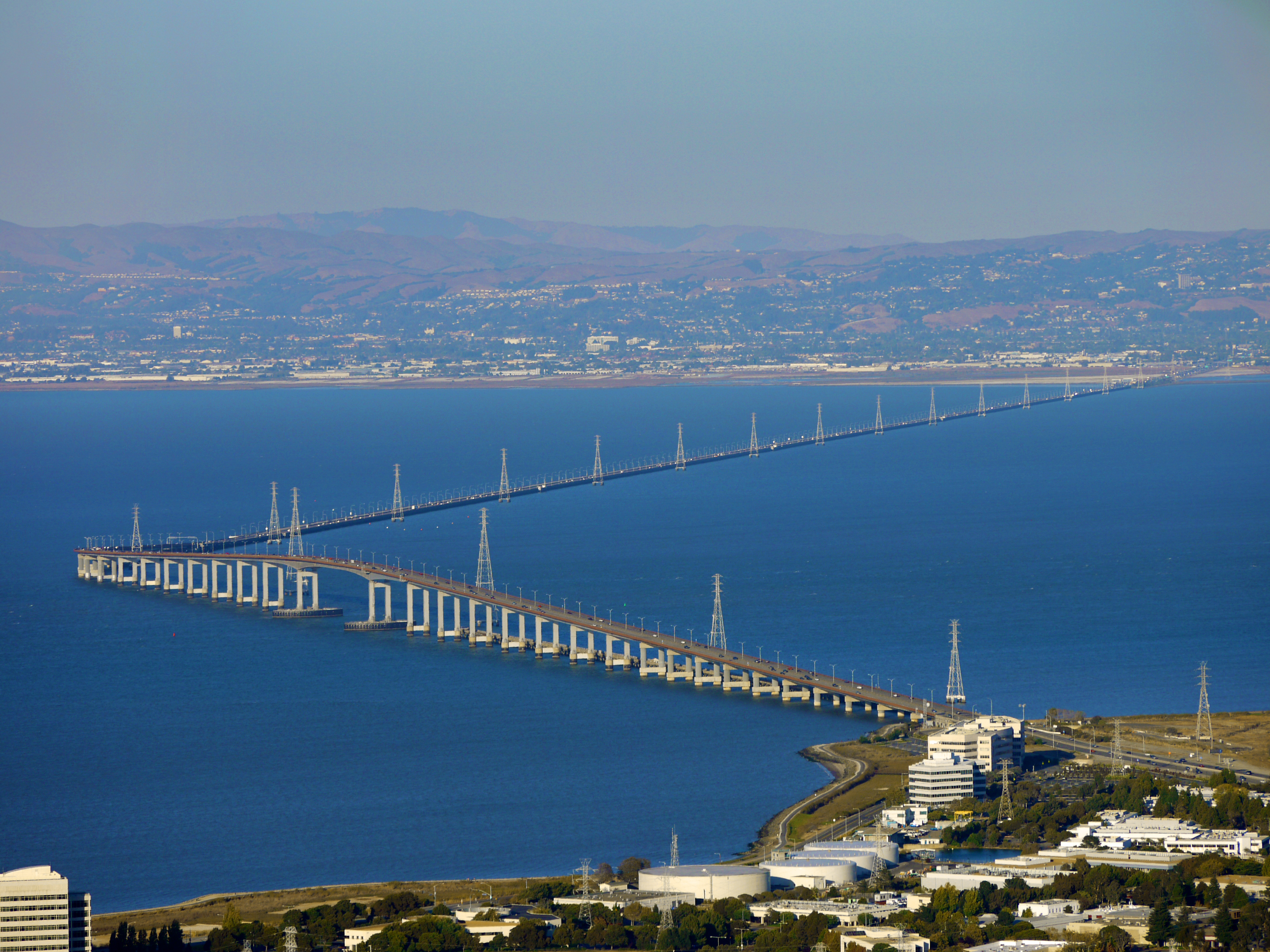
- Aerial view of the San Mateo–Hayward Bridge, with Foster City in the foreground
- Coordinates: 37.6019°N 122.2047°W
- Carries: 6 lanes of SR 92
- Crosses: San Francisco Bay
- Locale: Foster City and Hayward, California, U.S.
- Other name: San Mateo Bridge
- Owner: State of California
- Maintained by: California Department of Transportation and the Bay Area Toll Authority
- ID number: 35 0054

Characteristics
- Design: Orthotropic deck (western highrise span); trestle (eastern causeway spans)
- Total length: 36,960 ft (11,270 m); 7.0 mi (11.3 km)
- Width: 41 m (135 ft) roadway approach
- Longest span: 757.2 ft (230.8 m)
- No. of spans: 37 (highrise); 871 (causeway)
- Clearance below: 134.5 ft (41.0 m)

History
- Designer: Caltrans, Bay Toll Crossings Division
- Constructed by: superstructure: Murphy Pacific Bridge Builders, Emeryville; substructure: Pomeroy-Gerwick-Steers, San Francisco
- Fabrication by: Murphy Pacific Corporation, Emeryville
- Construction cost: $70,000,000 (equivalent to $501 million in 2024)
- Opened: October 31, 1967; November 4, 2002 (new westbound causeway)

Statistics
- Daily traffic: 93,000
- Toll: Westbound only; FasTrak or pay-by-plate, cash not accepted; Effective January 1 – December 31, 2026: $8.50; $4.25 (carpool rush hours, FasTrak only)

Location
- Interactive map of San Mateo–Hayward Bridge

The San Mateo–Hayward Bridge (commonly called the San Mateo Bridge) is a bridge crossing the American state of California's San Francisco Bay, linking the San Francisco Peninsula with the East Bay. The bridge's western end is in Foster City, a suburb on the eastern edge of San Mateo. The eastern end of the bridge is in Hayward. It is the longest fixed-link bridge in California and the 25th longest in the world. The bridge is owned by the state of California, and is maintained by California Department of Transportation (Caltrans), the state highway agency. Further oversight is provided by the Bay Area Toll Authority (BATA).

The bridge is part of State Route 92 (SR 92), whose western terminus is at the city of Half Moon Bay on the Pacific coast. It links Interstate 880 (I-880) in the East Bay with U.S. Route 101 (US 101) on the peninsula. It is roughly parallel to, and lies between, the San Francisco–Oakland Bay Bridge and the Dumbarton Bridge.

== History and description ==
=== 1929 original bridge ===
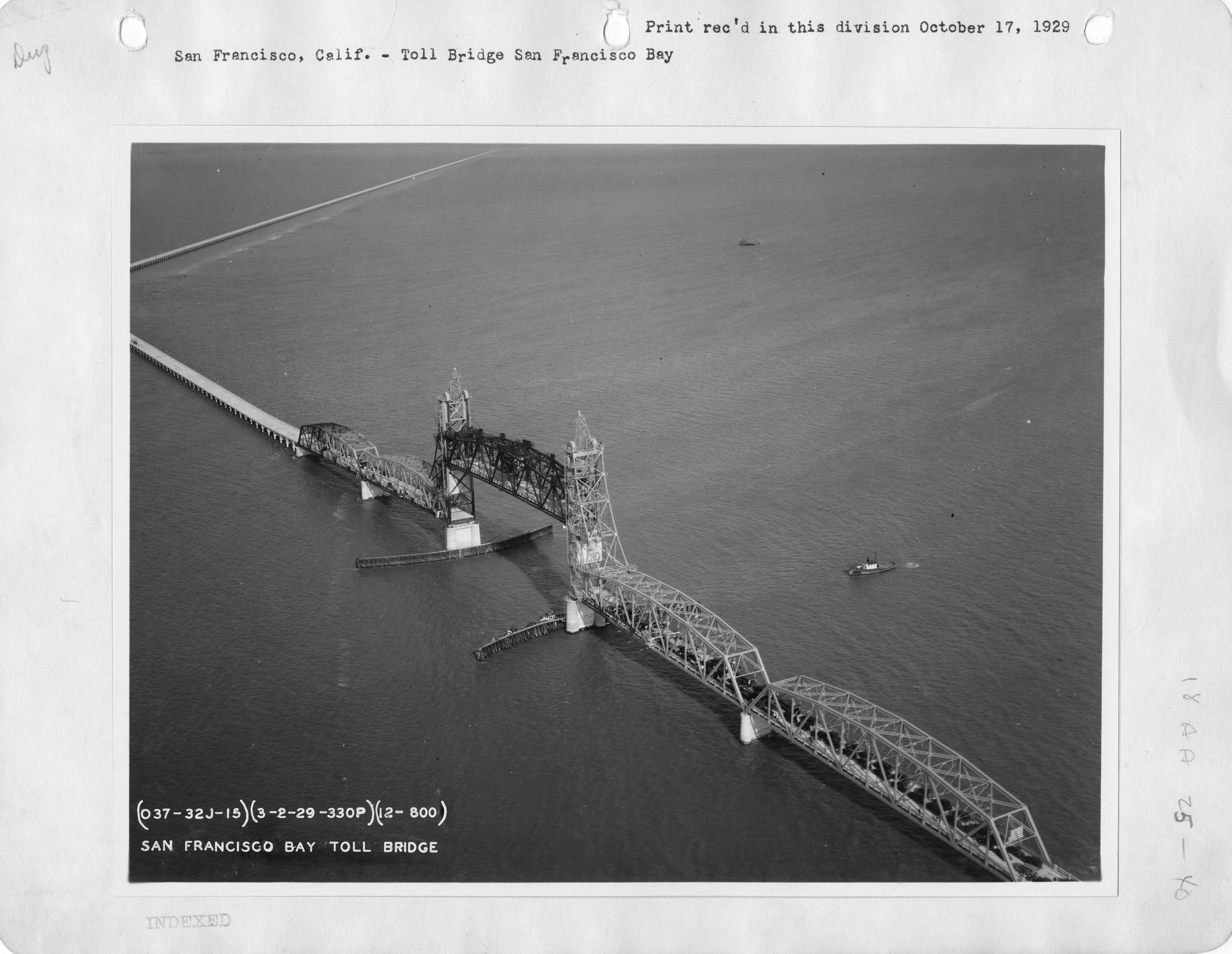
Lift span of the original bridge

The San Francisco Bay Toll-Bridge Company issued $4.5 million (equivalent to $65.2 million in 2024) in bonds to raise a portion of the estimated $7.5 million (equivalent to $109 million in 2024) budget required to build the first bridge. First-year operating revenues were anticipated to be $868,469 (equivalent to $12.6 million in 2024), but the original bridge lost money in its first year of operation.

The original bridge, known as the San Francisco Bay Toll Bridge, opened on March 2, 1929 after about a year of construction. It was a privately owned venture and was then the longest bridge in the world. Most of the original bridge was a causeway trestle 27 feet wide, with five 300-foot (91 m) truss spans in the center incorporating a vertical lift over the main shipping channel. Clearance when the lift was down to allow road traffic over the bridge was 35 feet (11 m), and clearance with the lift up to allow marine traffic to pass the bridge was 135 feet (41 m).

The original drawbridge played a minor role in the history of the Stanford Axe. When Stanford students stole the Axe back from Cal in April 1930, the getaway car was presumed to be traveling the shortest route, which would be over the bridge, and pursuing Cal students gave chase. The operator on duty, who was a graduate student at Stanford, learned that Cal students were causing the increased traffic in pursuit of the Axe, so he raised the draw and stopped traffic. In fact, the getaway car was traveling back to Palo Alto via San Jose.

Although the initial press was favorable, daily traffic fell from the opening months and never exceeded 2,000 cars per day until 1947. The State of California purchased the bridge on September 12, 1951, for $6,000,000 (equivalent to $58 million in 2024). By 1955, traffic exceeded 9,000 cars per day, and in 1957, traffic was stopped an average of six times per day to allow ship traffic to pass the bridge. The bridge originally had pole lights along the entire stretch, which were later abandoned except over the vertical lift span. Traffic on the bridge increased from 3,000 cars per day in 1929 to 56,000 cars per day in 1968. Before the new bridge was complete, California put the original truss spans up for sale in 1965, with the buyer obligated to remove all five truss spans after completion of the 1967 bridge.

=== 1967 orthotropic bridge ===
With increased road and marine traffic, a bill was introduced in 1961 by State Senator Richard J. Dolwig to fund a new fixed high-level bridge to replace the 1929 lift-bridge. The modern span, which began construction on July 17, 1961, opened for traffic in 1967 at a cost of $70,000,000 (equivalent to $501 million in 2024). The originally designed upgrade would retain the existing lift span (along with the attendant delays due to passing ship traffic), adding a second deck to the truss spans and widening the existing trestles to four lanes, but the California Toll Bridge Authority added $30,000,000 (equivalent to $240 million in 2024) to the project budget in September 1961 to replace the existing lift span with a fixed high-level double-deck span, which would have been similar in appearance to the nearby 1956 Richmond–San Rafael Bridge.

By that time, prior phases of the project had already been awarded to relocate the toll plaza from San Mateo to Hayward on new fill and bids were taken for the new eastern trestle, with trestle construction awarded to Peter Kiewit Sons'. The finished single-deck design was not finalized until January 1962, with work initially estimated to complete in 1965.

The new span won two prizes in 1968: an ASCE Award for Outstanding Civil Engineering Achievement and an American Institute of Steel Construction long-span prize bridge award.

William Stephen Allen was retained as an architectural consultant, although the bridge was designed by the Bay Toll Crossings Division (under Chief Engineer Norman C. Raab) of the California Department of Public Works. Chuck Seim, one of the design engineers working for Bay Toll Crossings, would later credit Allan Temko's criticism of Raab's economical truss design for the Richmond–San Rafael crossing for generating sufficient public pressure to drive the single-deck design. Temko's article quoted Tung-Yen Lin as being against a repeat of the Richmond–San Rafael design, but Lin ultimately gave Temko the credit for the design. Raab retired and his successor, E.R. "Mike" Foley, was willing to incorporate aesthetic considerations, resulting in the final design. The western highrise span features an all-steel superstructure, with an orthotropic deck over two parallel box girders, following the construction of several smaller test bridges using the same orthotropic deck technology. It was the first large-scale use of an orthotropic deck, which reduces weight, and thus seismic loading, although the bridge is expected to receive moderate to major damage following an earthquake.

Murphy Pacific Marine built the Marine Boss floating barge-crane in 1966 with a 500-short-ton (454 t) capacity to perform the heavy box girder and deck-section lifts. The heavy lift capacity of Marine Boss enabled Murphy Pacific to raise much longer prefabricated girders than existing barge cranes would have allowed. Box girder and deck sections were fabricated in Murphy Pacific's Richmond yard and were carried by Marine Boss to the bridge construction site. Marine Boss was sold for scrap in 1988 to Weeks Marine in New Jersey, who renamed it the Weeks 533 and refurbished it. Weeks 533 has since been used for several notable heavy lifts, including moving the Concorde and Enterprise onto the Intrepid Sea, Air & Space Museum and lifting the downed hull of US Airways Flight 1549 from the Hudson River.

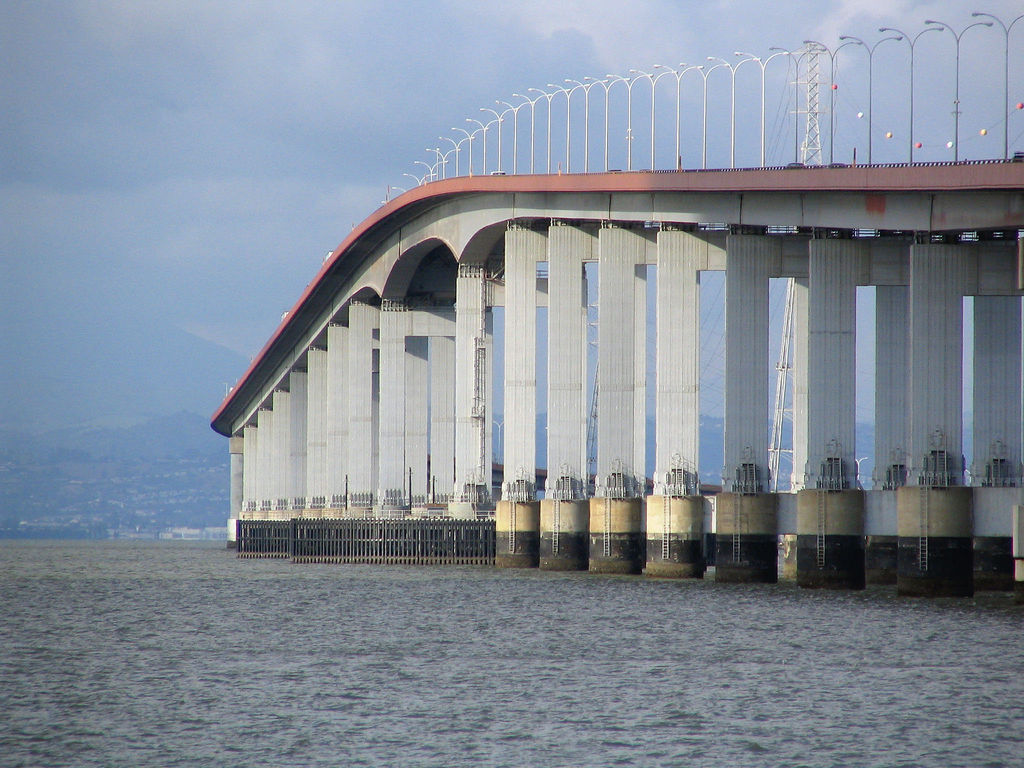
The highrise section of the San Mateo–Hayward bridge (1967 span).

The total length of the bridge is 7 miles (11.3 km), which is made up of a western 1.9-mile (3.1 km) highrise section and an eastern 5.1-mile (8.2 km) trestle section. Approximately 425,000 cubic yards (325,000 m^{3}) of fill were used at the Hayward end to reclaim land for placing the toll plaza and administrative buildings. The eastern trestle span was built on 4,840 prestressed hollow concrete piles, each 60–90 feet (18–27 m) long. The contractor built a casting yard in Richmond to produce the concrete piles continuously. The new eastern trestle span was completed in 1963 and traffic over the existing 1929 bridge was moved over to it.

Work on the western highrise span was bid in October 1964 and commenced in 1965. It crosses a shipping channel, with an orthotropic main span that is 750 feet (229 m) long (at the time, the longest girder span in the United States) and has a vertical clearance of 135 feet (41 m). The main span is flanked by two orthotropic back spans which are each 375 feet (114 m) long, and there are seven orthotropic side spans on the approach to each back span. Each of these side spans are 292 feet (89 m) long. Although these spans appear to be formed from continuous box girders, they consist of alternating anchor spans and suspended spans. Anchor spans rest on top of two adjacent piers and cantilever over each side slightly, and suspended spans are hung between the ends of two adjacent anchor spans. There are an additional nine 208-foot (63 m) steel spans carrying a concrete deck on the San Mateo side of the highrise, and ten steel spans carrying a concrete deck on the Hayward side, ranging from 186 to 208 feet (57 to 63 m). The bridge carries about 93,000 cars and other vehicles on a typical day, almost double its original projected design capacity of 50,000 vehicles per day.

The steel deck of the bridge, approximately 418,000 square feet (38,800 m^{2}), was paved with an epoxy asphalt concrete wearing surface in two layers. The San Mateo Bridge was the first deployment of an epoxy asphalt concrete wearing surface. As of 2005, the original wearing surface was still in use, but was subsequently replaced in 2015.

The highrise section was initially built with six lanes and the eastern causeway with four lanes (two in each direction). The causeway section was a perennial traffic bottleneck until it was expanded to six lanes in 2002, along with much needed improvements in its connections with Interstate 880 in Hayward.

AC Transit began route M bus service over the bridge in May 2003. Service was suspended in 2020 due to ridership losses following the COVID-19 pandemic in the San Francisco Bay Area.

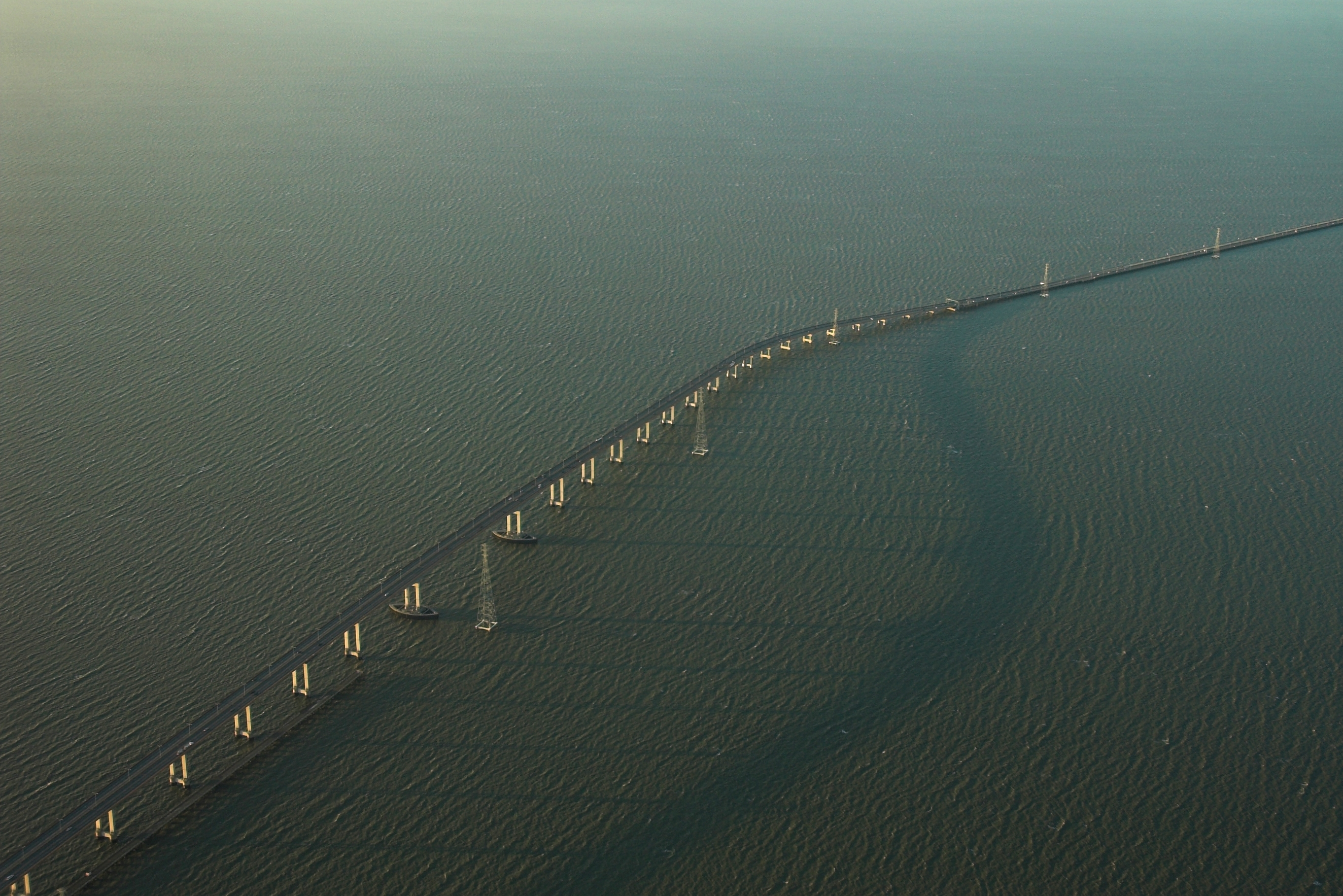
San Mateo–Hayward Bridge (1967), showing some of the electric transmission towers paralleling the bridge route and Werder Pier (at left)

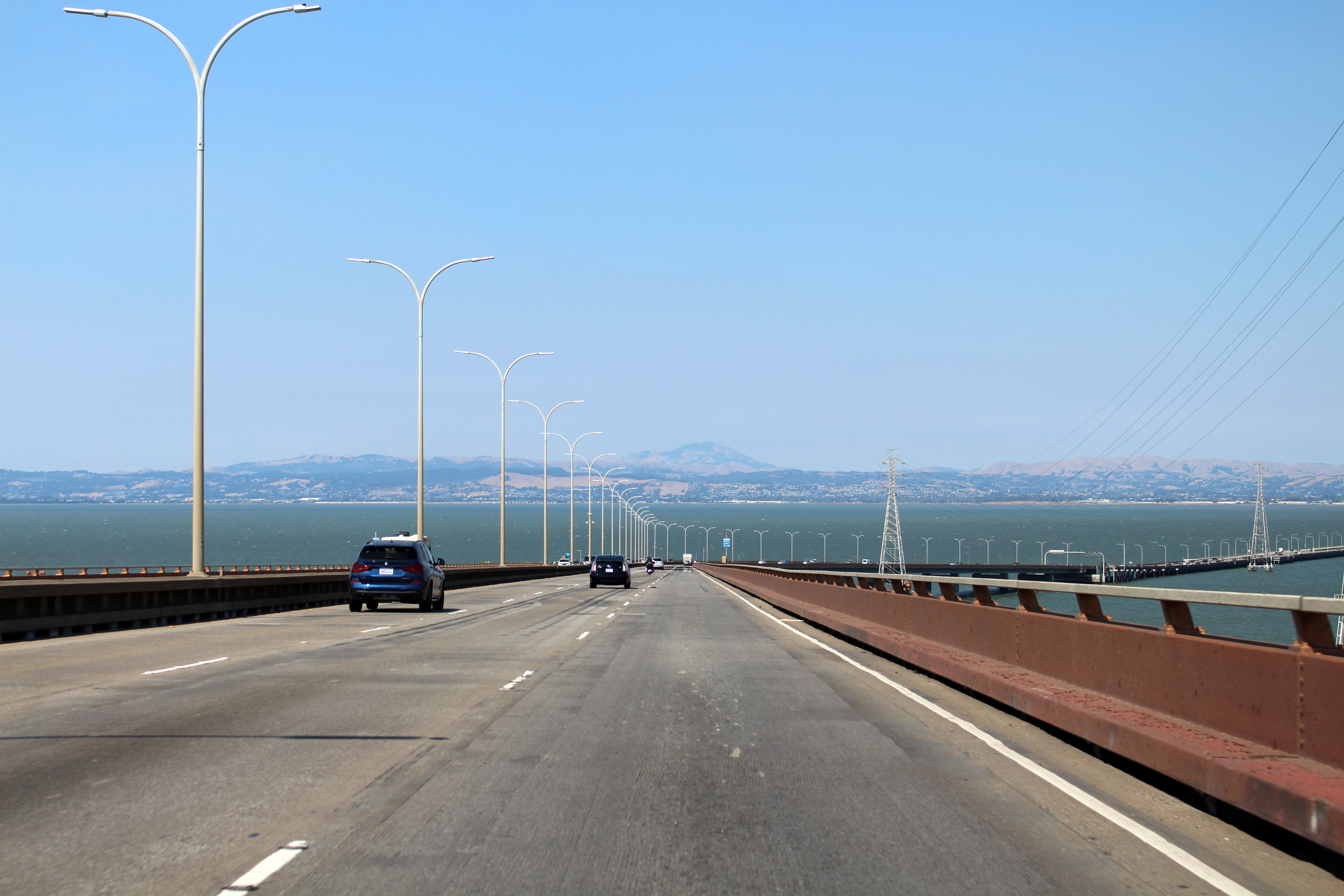
The view of the East Bay as seen by eastbound traffic on the descent from the highrise

High-voltage power lines built by PG&E in the 1950s parallel the bridge all the way across the bay. They provide power to the peninsula and San Francisco.

=== Upgrades and repairs ===
==== Seismic upgrades (1997–2000) ====
The bridge was closed in the wake of the 1989 Loma Prieta earthquake as a precaution, but reopened on October 18, 1989. It underwent an extensive seismic retrofitting from 1997 through 2000 to protect against earthquake damage.

==== Second span (2002–2003) ====
The bridge was considered the worst evening commute in the Bay Area; this ended with the completion of a new eastern trestle carrying westbound bridge traffic in 2002. Eastbound bridge traffic took over the old trestle completely, though eastbound traffic was not expanded to three lanes until February 2003. Funded as part of BATA's regional Measure (RM) 1 program, which raised bridge tolls, the new low-rise trestle portion of the bridge added 10-foot (3.0 m) shoulders on both sides in both directions and effectively widened traffic from four to six lanes, matching the configuration of the high-rise portion of the bridge. With the completion of the new westbound trestle, the speed limit on the bridge was raised to 65 miles per hour (105 km/h).

==== Seismic beam (2010–2015) ====
A beam, which had been added as part of the seismic retrofit project, was found in a cracked condition during a routine inspection in October 2010. The beam, which was on the westbound approach to (east of) the highrise section, was patched with a steel plate as an emergency repair, and permanent repairs, requiring a weekend shutdown, were completed two years later.

==== Repaving (2015) ====
After nearly forty years of service from the original orthotropic deck wearing surface, Myers and Sons Construction, a partnership between C. C. Myers and Sterling Construction Company, was the selected bidder to remove and replace the wearing surface on the highrise portion in 2015. The work required two full weekend closures on May 8–11, 2015 and May 22–25, 2015. The new polyester concrete wearing surface, developed by Caltrans and used to great success in other Bay Area bridges, is anticipated to be at least as durable as the original epoxy asphalt concrete, according to laboratory tests conducted at the University of Missouri-Columbia.

The bridge was closed to traffic, for the first time since opening, starting at 10 pm on Friday, May 8, 2015, for resurfacing and maintenance. The bridge reopened before 4 am on Monday, May 11, 2015. It closed again for the final phase over Memorial Day weekend, May 22–25, 2015, fully reopening by 4:55 am on May 25.

=== Werder Pier ===
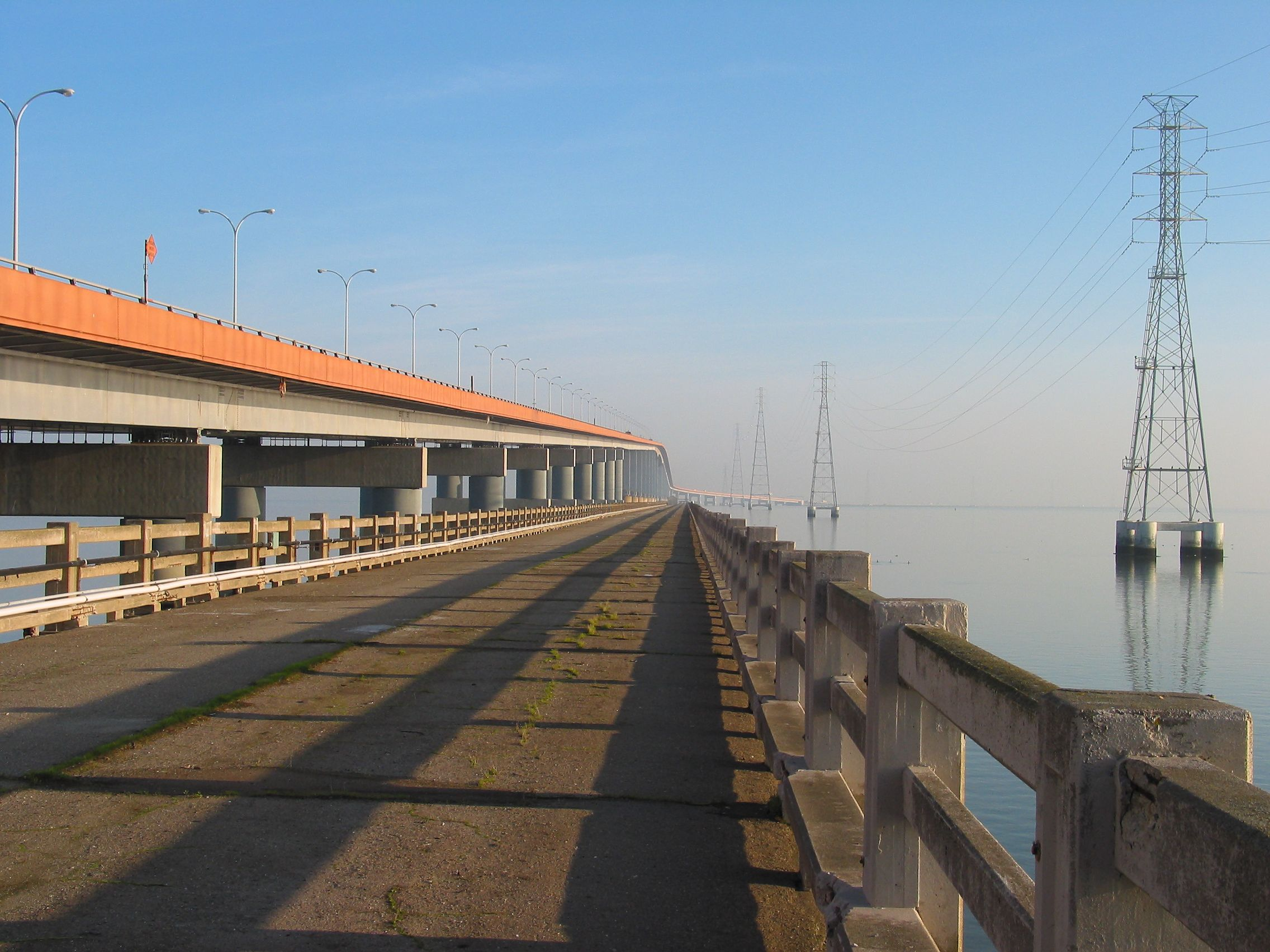
Werder Pier, the remnant of the original 1929 western trestle span

After the new bridge was built, the old bridge was demolished but the western approach (the trestle span up to the original truss spans) was purchased by the County of San Mateo in 1968 for the nominal sum of $10 (equivalent to $69 in 2024) and retained as the 4,055-foot (1,236 m) Werder Fishing Pier, which was known as one of the best places to catch sharks in San Francisco Bay. San Mateo County operated Werder Pier under a lease agreement with Caltrans, which stated that Caltrans may temporarily revoke the lease in order to use the pier as a staging area for repairs to the 1967 span, and that San Mateo County must maintain the pier and keep it open for public use for 25 years.

Werder Pier was closed to the public in 1996, when Caltrans used it as an equipment staging area for the seismic retrofit of the 1967 span. In addition, there were liability concerns since the pier's structure had degraded due to exposure to marine elements. A report was prepared for the county in 2004; the cost of rehabilitating the pier and providing some improvements was estimated at up to $7,200,000 (equivalent to $11.4 million in 2024), depending on a more detailed evaluation of the pier's condition, since the investigation for the report revealed numerous cracks, spalls and exposed reinforcing steel. However, the report also stated the pier did not require any seismic retrofitting.

As of 2013 ownership of the parking lot and land access to the pier was transferred to Foster City. Initial concepts for the newly acquired space included a possible ice rink and ferry terminal, but the land was deemed too environmentally sensitive to support high-intensity use. The park carried an interim name of Werder Park, and was dedicated as Bridgeview Park for a grand opening on June 27, 2015.

== Tolls ==
Tolls are collected only from westbound traffic headed to San Mateo at the toll plaza on the Hayward side of the bridge. All-electronic tolling has been in effect since 2020, and drivers may pay using either the FasTrak electronic toll collection device or the license plate tolling program. It remains not truly an open road tolling system until the remaining unused toll booths are removed, forcing drivers to slow substantially from freeway speeds while passing through. Effective January 1 – December 31, 2026, the toll rate for passenger cars is $8.50. During peak traffic hours on weekdays between 5:00 am and 10:00 am, and between 3:00 pm and 7:00 pm, carpool vehicles carrying three or more people or motorcycles may pay a discounted toll of $4.25 if they use the designated carpool lane with a FasTrak Flex transponder with its switch set to indicate the number of the vehicle's occupants (1, 2, or 3+). Two-person carpools may still use the carpool lane but will still be charged the full toll. Drivers without Fastrak or a license plate account must open and pay via a "short term" account within 48 hours after crossing the bridge or they will be sent an invoice of the unpaid toll. No additional toll violation penalty will be assessed if the invoice is paid within 21 days.

=== Historical toll rates ===
Prior to 1969, tolls on the San Mateo–Hayward Bridge were collected in both directions. When it opened, the original 1929 span had a toll of $0.45 (equivalent to $8.44 in 2025) per car plus $0.05 (equivalent to $0.94 in 2025) per passenger. In 1959, tolls were set to $0.35 (equivalent to $3.87 in 2025) per car, and remained that amount when the 1967 span was completed. It was raised to $0.70 (equivalent to $6.15 in 2025) in 1969, then $0.75 (equivalent to $4.24 in 2025) in 1976.

The basic toll (for automobiles) on the seven state-owned bridges, including the San Mateo–Hayward Bridge, was standardized to $1 by Regional Measure 1, approved by Bay Area voters in 1988 (equivalent to $2.72 in 2025). A $1 seismic retrofit surcharge was added in 1998 by the state legislature, increasing the toll to $2 (equivalent to $3.95 in 2025), originally for eight years, but since then extended to December 2037 (AB1171, October 2001). On March 2, 2004, voters approved Regional Measure 2 to fund various transportation improvement projects, raising the toll by another dollar to $3 (equivalent to $5.11 in 2025). An additional dollar was added to the toll starting January 1, 2007, to cover cost overruns on the eastern span replacement of the Bay Bridge, increasing the toll to $4 (equivalent to $6.21 in 2025).

The Metropolitan Transportation Commission (MTC), a regional transportation agency, in its capacity as the Bay Area Toll Authority, administers RM1 and RM2 funds, a significant portion of which are allocated to public transit capital improvements and operating subsidies in the transportation corridors served by the bridges. Caltrans administers the "second dollar" seismic surcharge, and receives some of the MTC-administered funds to perform other maintenance work on the bridges. The state legislature created the Bay Area Toll Authority in 1997 to transfer the toll administration of the seven state-owned bridges to the MTC. The Bay Area Toll Authority is made up of appointed officials put in place by various city and county governments, and is not subject to direct voter oversight.

Due to further funding shortages for seismic retrofit projects, the Bay Area Toll Authority again raised tolls on all seven of the state-owned bridges in July 2010. The toll rate for autos on the San Mateo–Hayward Bridge was thus increased to $5 (equivalent to $7.38 in 2025).

In June 2018, Bay Area voters approved Regional Measure 3 to further raise the tolls on all seven of the state-owned bridges to fund $4.5 billion worth of transportation improvements in the area. Under the passed measure, the toll rate for autos on the San Mateo–Hayward Bridge was increased to $6 on January 1, 2019; to $7 on January 1, 2022; and then to $8 on January 1, 2025.

In September 2019, the MTC approved a $4 million plan to eliminate toll takers and convert all seven of the state-owned bridges to all-electronic tolling, citing that 80 percent of drivers are now using Fastrak and the change would improve traffic flow. On March 20, 2020, accelerated by the COVID-19 pandemic, all-electronic tolling was placed in effect for all seven state-owned toll bridges. The MTC then installed new systems at all seven bridges to make them permanently cashless by the start of 2021. In April 2022, the Bay Area Toll Authority announced plans to remove all remaining unused toll booths and create an open-road tolling system which functions at highway speeds.

The Bay Area Toll Authority then approved a plan in December 2024 to implement 50-cent annual toll increases on all seven state-owned bridges between 2026 and 2030 to help pay for bridge maintenance. The standard toll rate for autos will thus rise to $8.50 on January 1, 2026; $9 in 2027; $9.50 in 2028; $10 in 2029; and then to $10.50 in 2030. And becoming effective in 2027, a 25-cent surcharge will be added to any toll charged to a license plate account, and a 50-cent surcharge added to a toll violation invoice, due to the added cost of processing these payment methods. The carpool lane rules will also be standardized across the toll bridges in 2026, with a minimum of three people required to qualify for the discount.

== See also ==
- Southern Crossing (California) - proposed parallel bridge
