= CA-242 =

CA-242 can refer to:

- California State Route 242, abbreviated as CA-242
- CA 242, a tumor marker
