= Thomas Foxwell Bachelder Barn =

Historic place in Sunol, California

- U.S. National Register of Historic Places
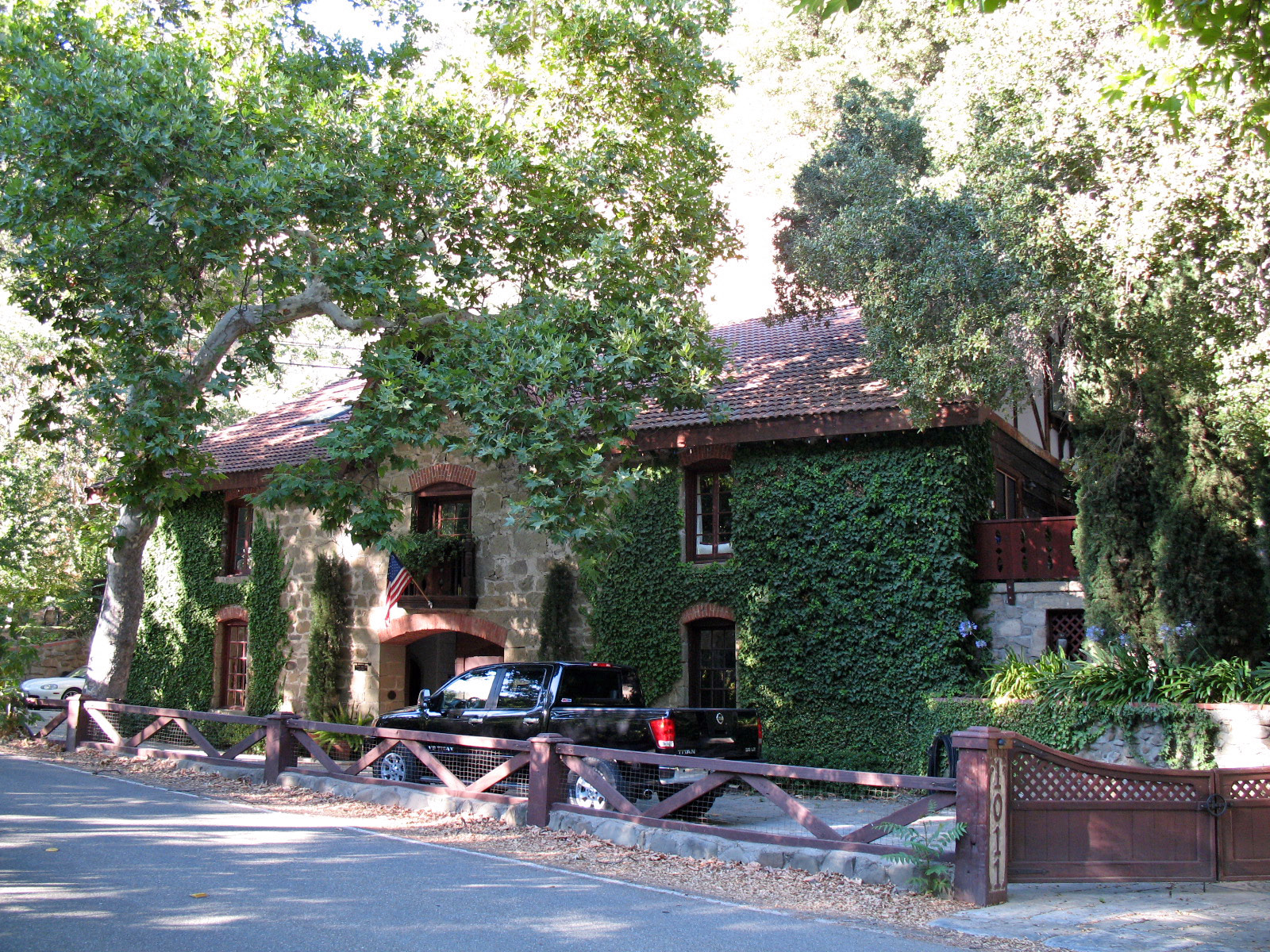
- Thomas Foxwell Bachelder Barn

- Location within California Location within the United States
- Location: 1011 Kilkare Rd., Sunol, California
- Coordinates: 37.6108106°N 121.8964595°W
- Built: 1888; 138 years ago
- NRHP reference No.: 94000359
- Added to NRHP: April 15, 1994

Thomas Foxwell Bachelder Barn is a historical building in Sunol, California, The Thomas Foxwell Bachelder Barn was built in 1888. The Thomas Foxwell Bachelder Barn was listed to the National Register of Historic Places on April 15, 1994. The Thomas Foxwell Bachelder Barn is a 2 1/2-story, stone building at the bottom of a hill in rural setting of Sunol. The barn was built from stones cut from Sinbad Creek, across the street from the barn. In the creek are still some stonecutter's marks in rocks. The stones are rough cut, with no finishing work. The agricultural building was built with 36 inch think stone walls. The barn served the 900-acre Bachelder farm. The farm was part of the 2,108-acre Bachelder Rancho that was as subdivided in 1884. The only other remains of the farm are two stone-lined cisterns and the stone foundations of a bridge and an old house. The barn was sold to its current owners in 1975. By 1975, the barn had been vacant for years and was dilapidated, as most of the wood parts of the barn were in very poor condition or missing. At that time the barn still had it original dirt first story dirt floor. The new owner converted the 1888 barn into a home and had it seismic retrofitting. It was listed, as it one of the five most important buildings from Sunol's early years. The other buildings being: the Sunol Water Temple, Elliston, the old Congregational Church, and the Apperson House.

Bachelder was born in 1834 in Maine. In Maine, Bachelder studied law and was a lawyer in Maine. He came to in California in 1864 and practiced law in San Francisco. He slowly bought up 2,108 acres of land in Sunol along the Sinbad Creek and planted 350 acres of orchards. Later, in the 1910s he sold the farm and returned to law in Oakland. Bachelder donated some of his land for the local Congregational Church of Sunol. In 1954, the church was painted brown and renamed The Little Brown Church of Sunol. Bachelder built the town's hotel, Hazel Glen, which he sold in 1890, and burned down 1910. Bachelder built the Kilkare Road in town. In 1884, Bachelder did a subdivision of his land, thus became the founder of the City of Sunol. Nearby is Pleasanton Ridge Regional Park.

== See also ==
- National Register of Historic Places listings in Alameda County, California
- Niles Canyon Railway
