= Mission Pass (Alameda County) =

- Stockton Pass
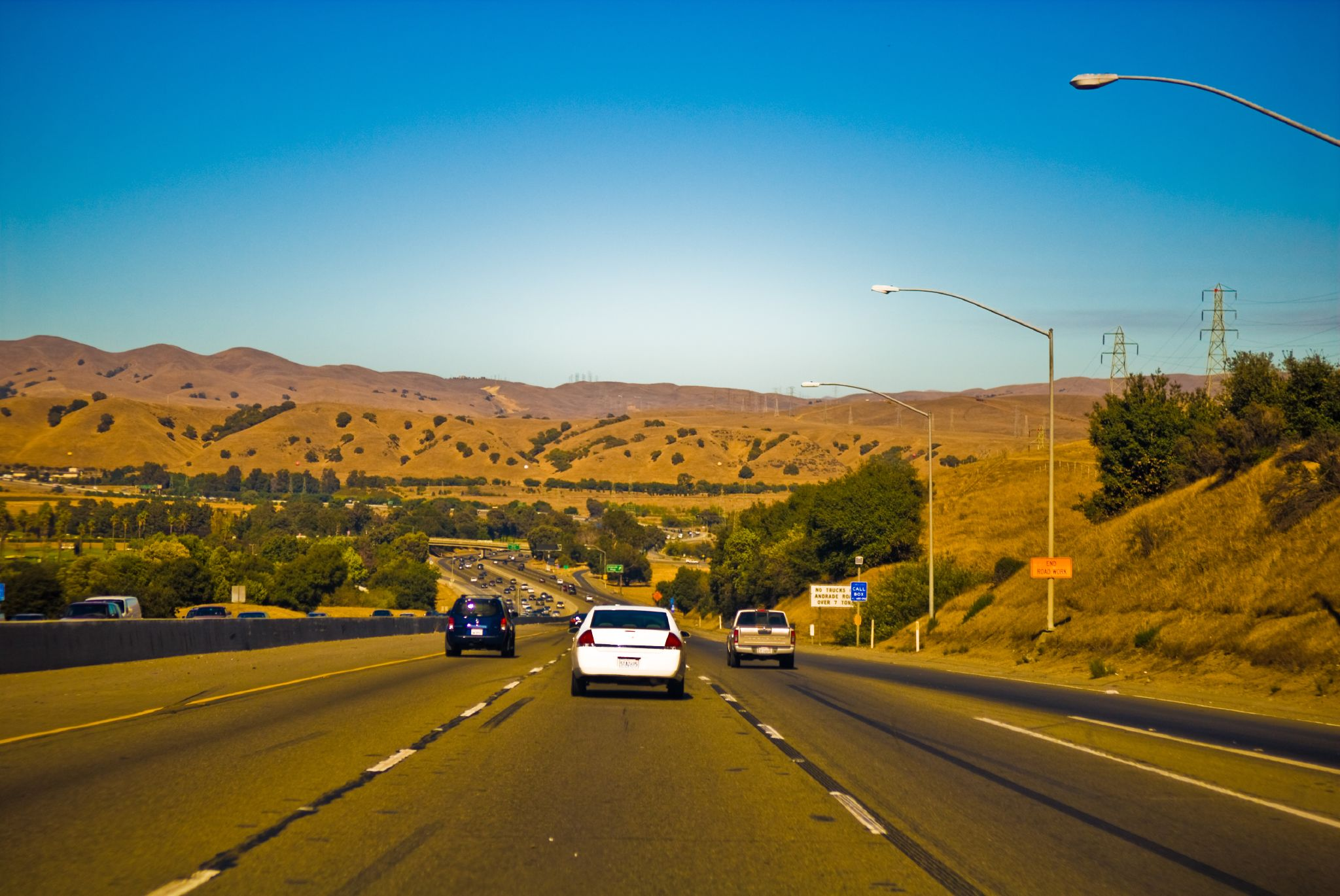
- Descending from Mission Pass on I-680 northbound

- Location within California
- Elevation: 662 ft (202 m)
- Traversed by: Interstate 680

Third Approach
- Location: Alameda County, California, United States
- Range: Diablo Range
- Coordinates: 37°33′37″N 121°54′39″W
- Topo map: Midway, California

Mission Pass, also known as the Sunol Grade and formerly as Stockton Pass, is a gap in the hills of the Mount Hamilton Range in Alameda County, California. It lies to the northeast of Mission San José, in Fremont, and leads from there into the Sunol Valley. Its elevation is 659 feet (201 m) above sea level. Today, Interstate 680 traverses this pass.

== History ==
The first Europeans to cross Mission Pass were the Spanish explorers Pedro Fages, and Padre Juan Crespí in 1772. It was later used by Spanish soldiers in their expeditions into the San Joaquin Valley. It was part of the route of El Camino Viejo between Livermore Valley and the Mission San Jose and from the Mission to what is now Contra Costa County. It was used by later American explorers Jedediah Smith and John Fremont. During the early part of the California Gold Rush it was on the main land route to Stockton and the gold fields.
