= Curtola =

Curtola may refer to:

- Bobby Curtola (1943–2016), Canadian singer and teen idol
- Curtola Park & Ride, a bus station in Vallejo, California
- Curtola Parkway, a stretch of Interstate 780, California
