= Sunol Valley =

Natural depression in the Diablo Range

Coordinates: 37°35′41.22″N 121°53′13.98″W

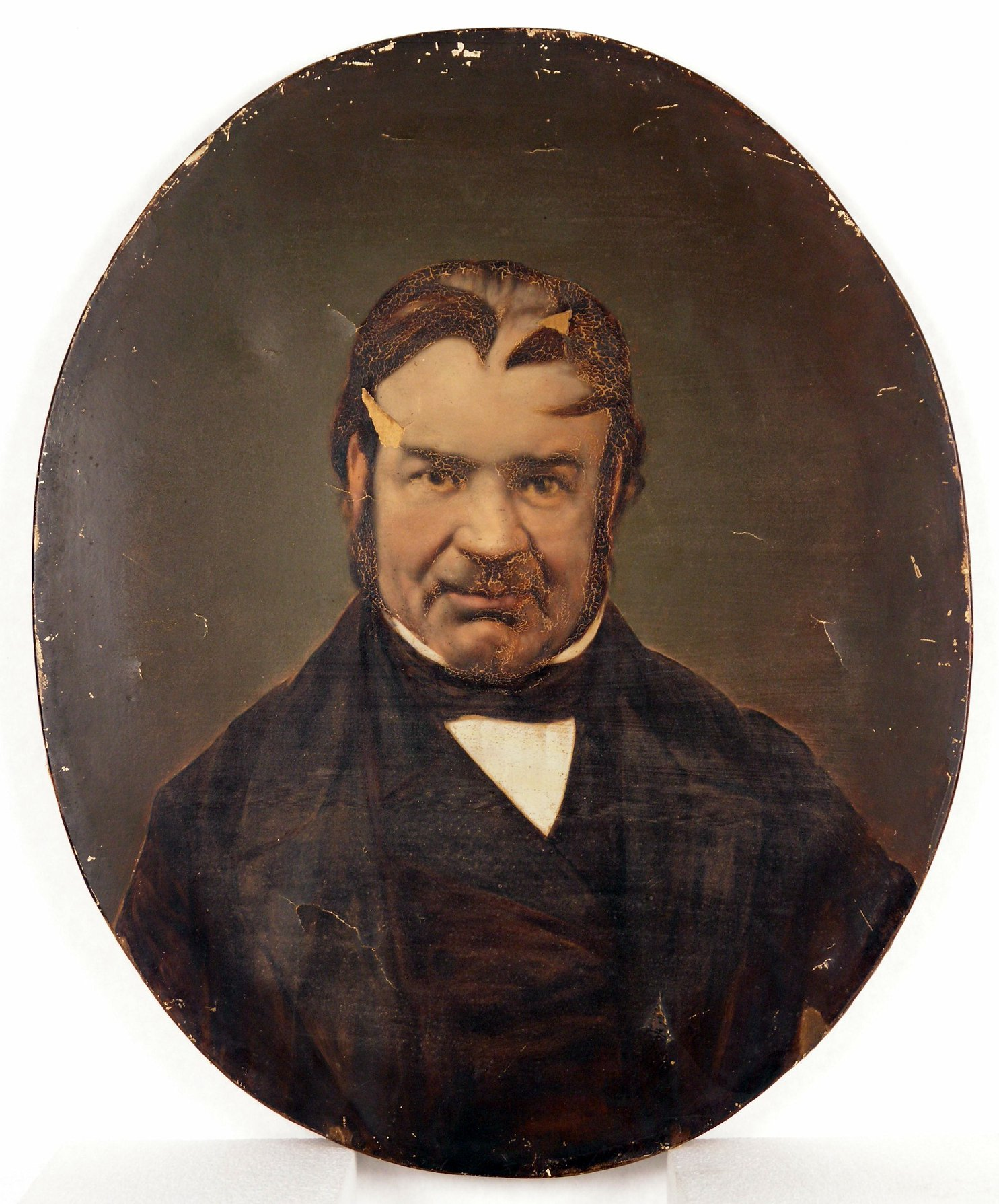
Sunol Valley and Sunol, California are named after Antonio Suñol, a prominent Californio ranchero.

Sunol Valley (Spanish: Valle de Suñol) is located in Alameda County, California, United States. The small town of Sunol lies in the valley. It is largely rural, but is in proximity to the highly populated Bay Area suburbs of Fremont, Pleasanton, and Livermore.

== Description ==
Interstate 680 runs through the valley. The historic Sunol Water Temple is situated in the Sunol Valley. Historically steelhead have run as high as the Sunol Valley via Alameda Creek, and restoration plans are underway to restore such anadromous fish runs. These restoration plans by the San Francisco Public Utilities Commission include the planned modification of a Pacific Gas and Electric pipeline that has blocked fish migration in Alameda Creek.

== Sunol Valley Quarry ==
The Sunol Valley Rock Quarry is located within the Sunol Valley; this facility has been used as the source for fill material in a considerable amount of the land development for neighboring communities. In the course of excavating this quarry for such fill, chemical analysis has been conducted to ascertain the safety of such soils. Resultant analyses have shown that the soil has environmentally safe characteristics as defined by low or non-detectable concentrations of 18 heavy metals and asbestos fibers.
