= Sunol, California =

Unincorporated community in California, United States

Sunol, California Suñol
- census-designated place
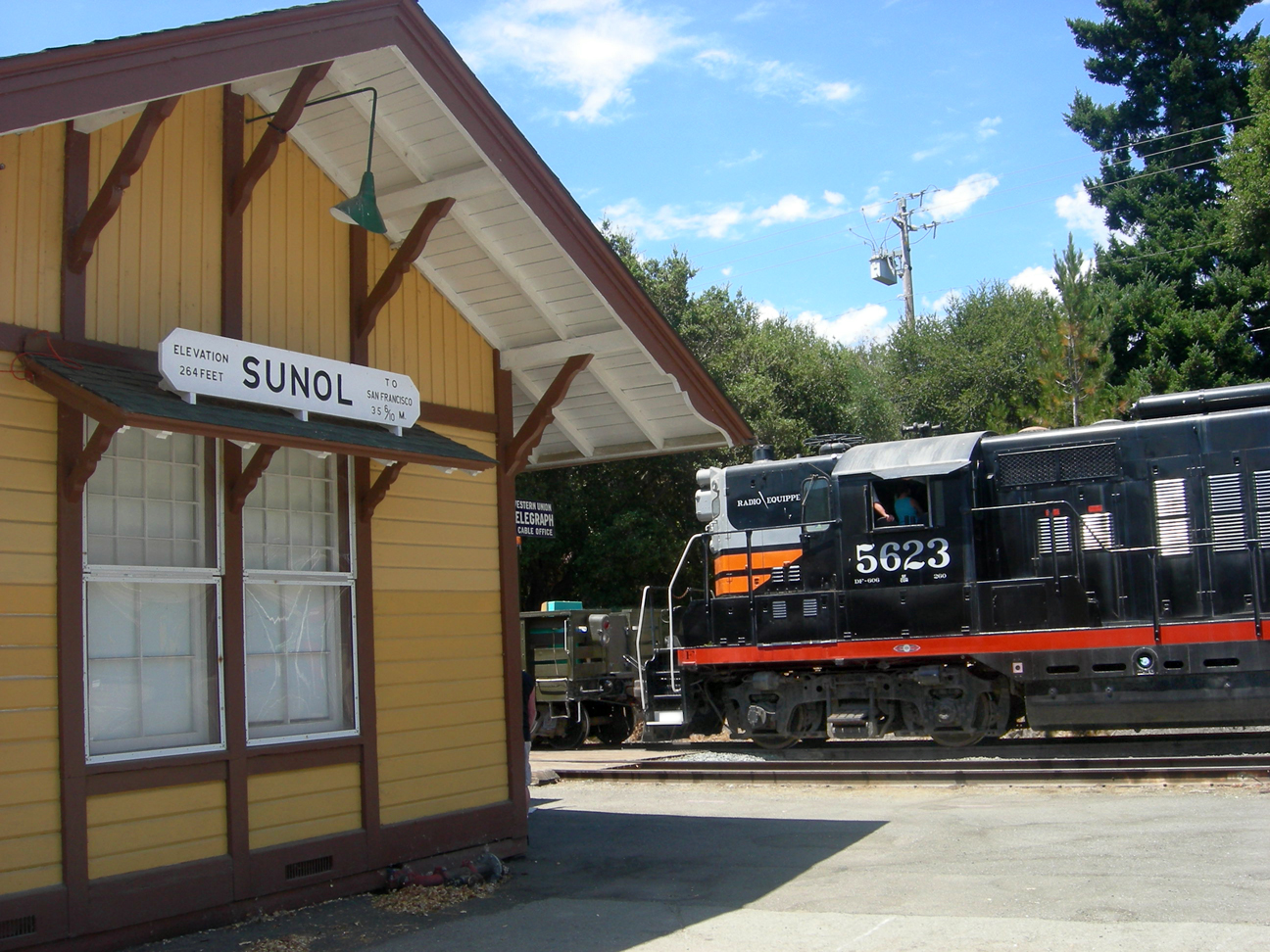
- Historic Sunol Train Depot, on the Niles Canyon Railway

- Location in Alameda County and the state of California
- Coordinates: 37°35′40″N 121°53′19″W
- Country: United States
- State: California
- County: Alameda

Government
  - State Senate: Jerry McNerney (D)
  - State Assembly: Alex Lee (D)
  - U.S. Congress: Aisha Wahab (D)

Area
  - Total: 28.59 sq mi (74.0 km^{2})
  - Land: 28.26 sq mi (73.2 km^{2})
  - Water: 0.334 sq mi (0.87 km^{2}) 1.2%
- Elevation: 266 ft (81 m)

Population (2020)
  - Total: 922
  - Density: 32.6/sq mi (12.6/km^{2})
- Time zone: UTC-8 (Pacific (PST))
  - Summer (DST): UTC-7 (PDT)
- ZIP code: 94586
- Area codes: 925, 510, 341
- FIPS code: 06-77042
- GNIS feature IDs: 1670341, 2410033

Sunol (Spanish: Suñol) is an unincorporated area and census-designated place in Alameda County, California, United States. Located in the Sunol Valley of the East Bay, the population was 922 at the 2020 census. It is best known as the location of the Sunol Water Temple and for its historic tourist railroad system, the Niles Canyon Railway.

== Etymology ==
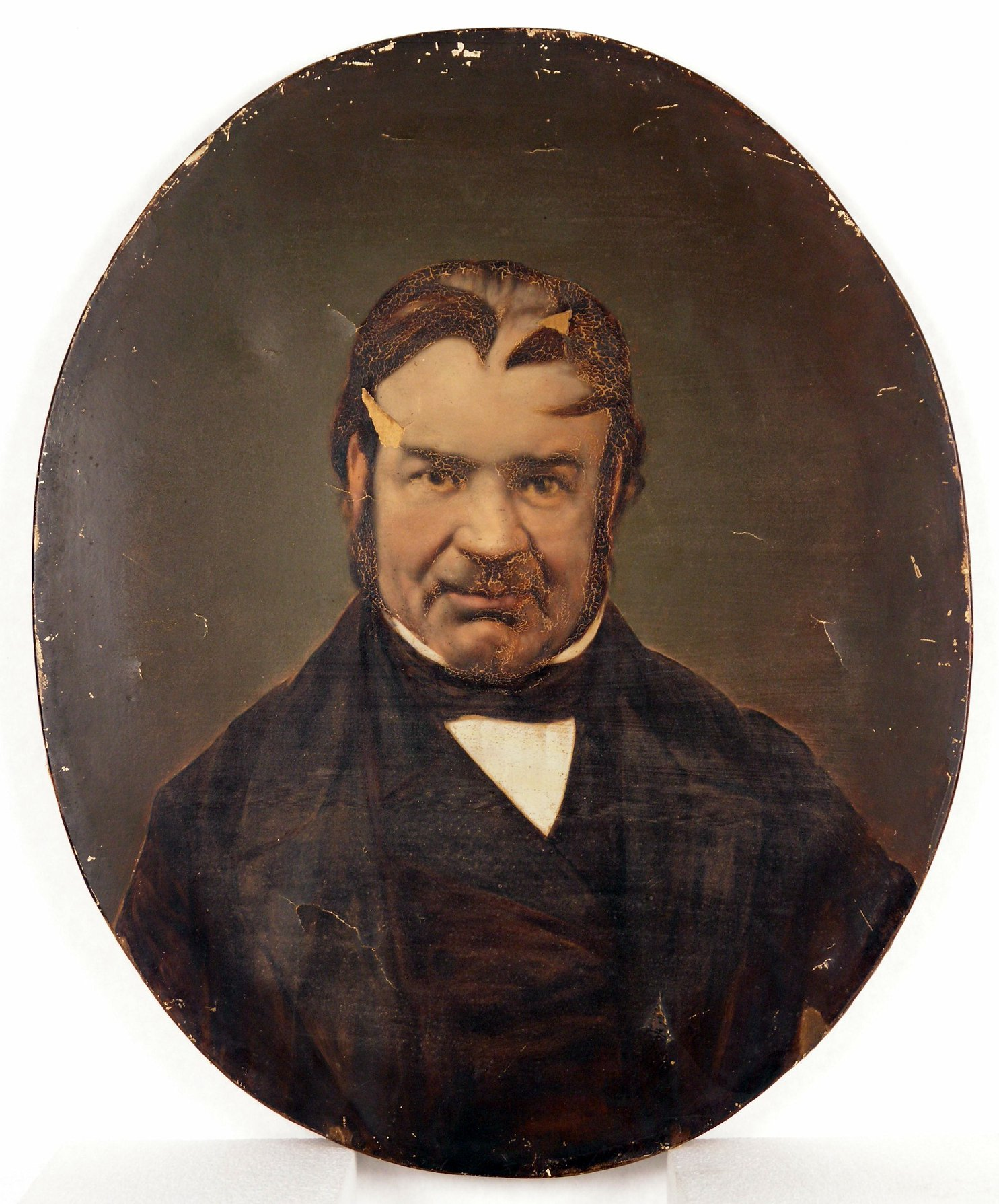
Don Antonio Suñol, founder and namesake of Sunol, founded on his Rancho Valle de San José.

Sunol, formerly Sunolglen, is named for Don Antonio Suñol, owner of Rancho Valle de San José. His adobe ranch house from the 1840s was located where the San Francisco water system's works are now located.

== History ==
The first Sunol post office opened in 1871 and the name was changed to Sunolglen the same year. The name reverted to Sunol in 1920. The town's name is in honor of Antonio Suñol, first postmaster in nearby San Jose and part owner of the historical Rancho Valle de San Jose land grant that once contained the site of the town. Thomas Foxwell Bachelder had large farm in Sunol and sold land in 1884 that founded much of the town.

== Geography ==
Sunol is located adjacent to two railroads and lies near the crossroads of Interstate 680 and State Route 84. These connect Sunol with Fremont to the south and west, Pleasanton to the north, and Livermore to the northeast. Sunol sits 17 miles (27 km) north of the center of San Jose and 32 miles (51 km) southeast of San Francisco.

The town lies near Alameda Creek at the northwest edge of the Sunol Valley. The San Antonio Reservoir lies 3 miles (4.8 km) to Sunol's east, and the Calaveras Reservoir lies 8 miles (13 km) south of the town.

North of downtown is the neighborhood of Kilkare Woods.

According to the United States Census Bureau, the Sunol CDP has a total area of 28.6 square miles (74 km^{2}), of which 98.8% is land and 1.2% is water.

== Demographics ==
Historical population
Census	Pop.	Note	%±
2000	1,332		—
2010	913		−31.5%
2020	922		1.0%
U.S. Decennial Census; 1860–1870 1880-1890; 1900 1910 1920; 1930 1940 1950; 1960 1970 1980; 1990 2000 2010; 2020

Sunol first appeared as a census designated place in the 2000 U.S. census.

=== 2020 census ===
Sunol CDP, California – Racial and ethnic composition Note: the US Census treats Hispanic/Latino as an ethnic category. This table excludes Latinos from the racial categories and assigns them to a separate category. Hispanics/Latinos may be of any race.
Race / Ethnicity (NH = Non-Hispanic)	Pop 2000	Pop 2010	Pop 2020	% 2000	% 2010	% 2020
White alone (NH)	1,077	719	618	80.86%	78.75%	67.03%
Black or African American alone (NH)	0	1	4	0.00%	0.11%	0.43%
Native American or Alaska Native alone (NH)	13	3	1	0.98%	0.33%	0.11%
Asian alone (NH)	64	48	105	4.80%	5.26%	11.39%
Native Hawaiian or Pacific Islander alone (NH)	3	5	5	0.23%	0.55%	0.54%
Other race alone (NH)	0	1	7	0.00%	0.11%	0.76%
Mixed race or Multiracial (NH)	59	45	39	4.43%	4.93%	4.23%
Hispanic or Latino (any race)	116	91	143	8.71%	9.97%	15.51%
Total	1,332	913	922	100.00%	100.00%	100.00%

The 2020 United States Census reported that Sunol had a population of 922. The population density was 32.6 inhabitants per square mile (12.6/km^{2}). The racial makeup of Sunol was 71.0% White, 0.4% African American, 0.1% Native American, 11.4% Asian, 0.5% Pacific Islander, 4.1% from other races, and 12.4% from two or more races. Hispanic or Latino of any race were 15.5% of the population.

The Census reported that 99.3% of the population lived in households, 0.7% lived in non-institutionalized group quarters, and none were institutionalized.

There were 359 households, out of which 22.3% included children under the age of 18, 59.6% were married-couple households, 4.7% were cohabiting couple households, 14.8% had a female householder with no partner present, and 20.9% had a male householder with no partner present. 24.0% of households were one person, and 14.8% were one person aged 65 or older. The average household size was 2.55. There were 259 families (72.1% of all households).

The age distribution was 14.3% under the age of 18, 7.6% aged 18 to 24, 21.3% aged 25 to 44, 30.0% aged 45 to 64, and 26.8% who were 65 years of age or older. The median age was 51.7 years. For every 100 females, there were 101.3 males.

There were 398 housing units at an average density of 14.1 units per square mile (5.4 units/km^{2}), of which 359 (90.2%) were occupied. Of these, 76.9% were owner-occupied, and 23.1% were occupied by renters.

In 2023, the US Census Bureau estimated that the median household income was $182,250, and the per capita income was $94,218. Of those aged 16 and over, 58.4% were employed.

== Area attractions ==
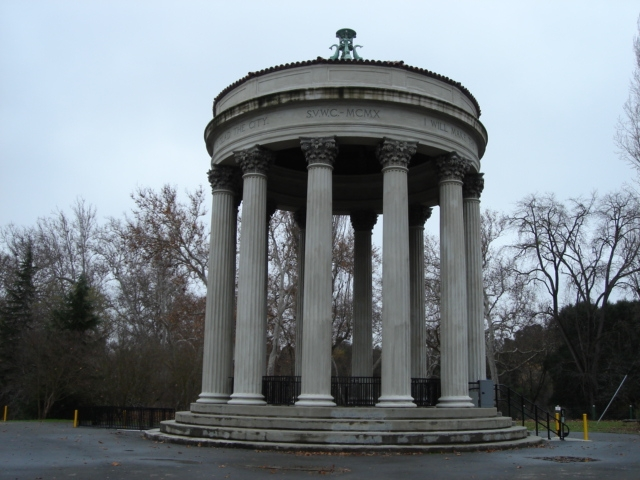
The Sunol Water Temple

- The Sunol Water Temple is an unusual Roman-inspired structure that marks the confluence of three sources of water that flow into the Sunol Valley.
- Sunol Regional Wilderness is part of the East Bay Regional Parks District, and has hiking trails, naturalist events, and a visitor center.
- The Niles Canyon Railway Sunol Depot was built in 1884, and is the last surviving example of a Southern Pacific standard design known as a "One-Story Combination Depot #7." The building has been restored and is operated by the Pacific Locomotive Association.
- Niles Canyon Road runs westward from Sunol and is a scenic 7-mile (11 km) drive to Fremont.
- A statue of Bosco, the dog elected mayor, sits in front of the Post Office. Bosco achieved a degree of international notoriety in 1990 when the Chinese newspaper People's Daily reported on his tenure as an alleged example of the failings of the American electoral process.
- In 2007, songwriter Will Stratton released a song named after the town on his first album.

== School district ==
The majority of Sunol is served by the Sunol Glen Unified School District. Castro Valley Unified School District and Pleasanton Unified School District serve small portions of Sunol.

The Sunol Glen School, a K–8 public school, is the sole school of Sunol Glen USD. High school students are served by other local high schools, including Foothill High School in nearby Pleasanton.
