= Interstate 680 (California) =

Interstate highway in California

Interstate 680
- I-680 highlighted in red

Route information
- Auxiliary route of I-80
- Maintained by Caltrans
- Length: 70.52 mi (113.49 km)
- History: State highway in 1933; Interstate in 1955
- Tourist routes: I-680 between Mission Boulevard (SR 238) in Fremont to SR 24 in Walnut Creek
- NHS: Entire route

Major junctions
- South end: I-280 / US 101 in San Jose
- SR 130 in San Jose; SR 237 in Milpitas; SR 262 in Fremont; SR 238 in Fremont; SR 84 near Sunol; I-580 at the Dublin–Pleasanton border; SR 24 in Walnut Creek; SR 242 near Concord; SR 4 in Martinez; I-780 in Benicia
- North end: I-80 / SR 12 in Fairfield

Location
- Country: United States
- State: California
- Counties: Santa Clara, Alameda, Contra Costa, Solano

Highway system
- Interstate Highway System; Main; Auxiliary; Suffixed; Business; Future; State highways in California; Interstate; US; State; Scenic; History; Pre‑1964; Unconstructed; Deleted; Freeways
← I-605	→ I-710

Interstate 680 (I-680) is a north–south auxiliary Interstate Highway in Northern California. It curves around the eastern cities of the San Francisco Bay Area from San Jose to I-80 at Fairfield, bypassing cities along the eastern shore of San Francisco Bay such as Oakland and Richmond while serving others more inland such as Pleasanton and Concord.

Built in the 1920s as SR 21 and designated in 1955, I-680 begins at a junction with I-280 and US Route 101 (US 101/Bayshore Freeway) and heads northeast and north-northwest through the northeast part of San Jose. After passing State Route 237 (SR 237) in Milpitas and SR 262 in Fremont, I-680 abruptly turns northeast (where a connection to a SR 238 freeway was planned) and enters the hills and valleys of the California Coast Ranges. The highway crosses over Mission Pass, also known as the Sunol Grade, and descends into the Sunol Valley, where it meets SR 84 near Sunol. From Sunol, I-680 again heads north-northwesterly through valleys, including the San Ramon Valley, along the Calaveras Fault. Junctions along this portion include I-580 in Dublin and SR 24 in Walnut Creek. Beyond the latter interchange, a three-way directional junction with the SR 24 freeway west to Oakland, I-680 heads north into Pleasant Hill, where SR 242 splits and I-680 again heads northwesterly. After the junction with SR 4 in Martinez, the highway crosses the Carquinez Strait on the Benicia–Martinez Bridge, immediately meeting the east end of I-780 on the Benicia end. The remainder of I-680, from Benicia to I-80 at Fairfield, lies between a hilly area to the west representing the southwestern tip of the Vaca Mountains, and a marshy area (along the Suisun Bay and Cordelia Slough) to the east.

== Route description ==
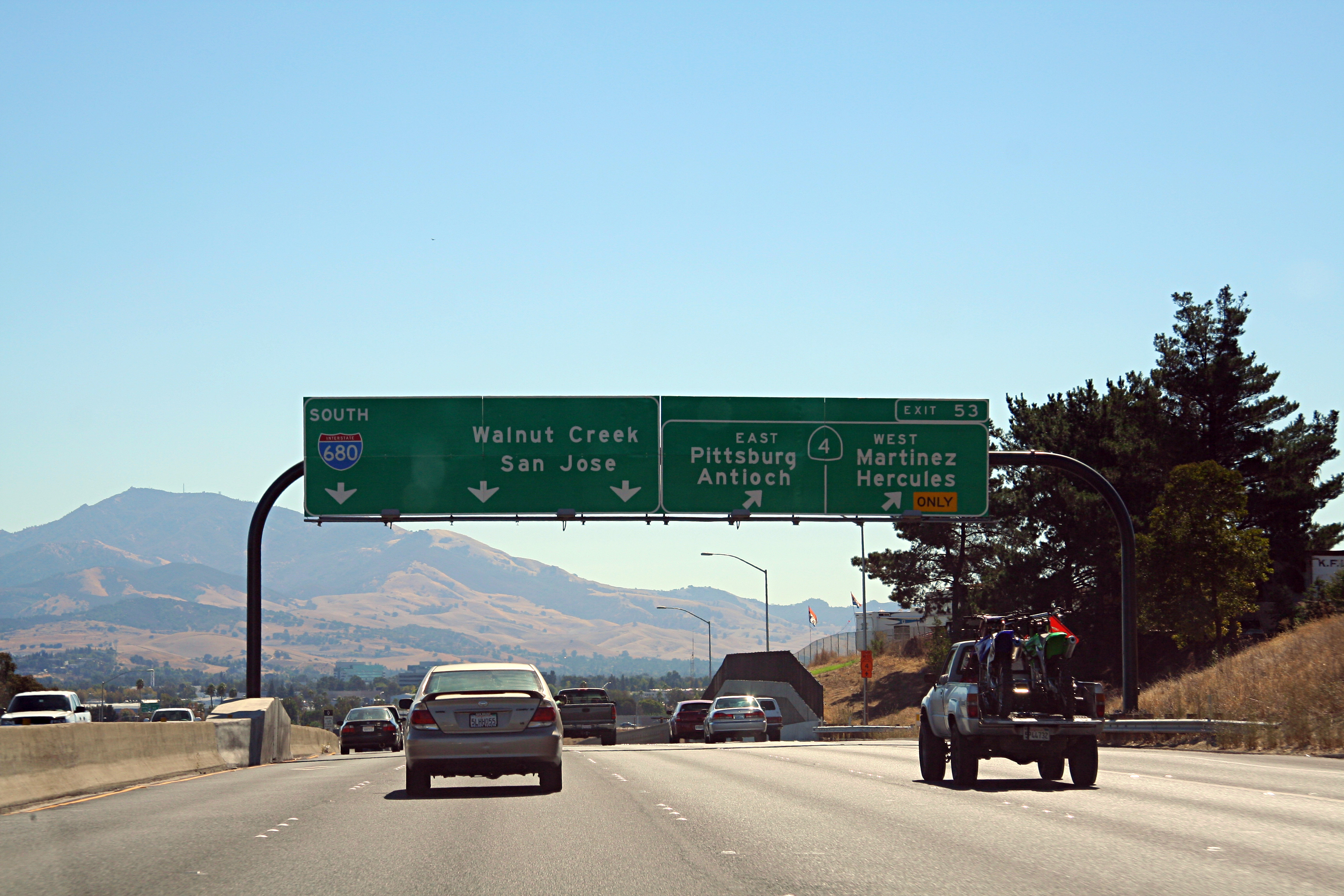
Southbound at SR 4, with Mount Diablo on the left

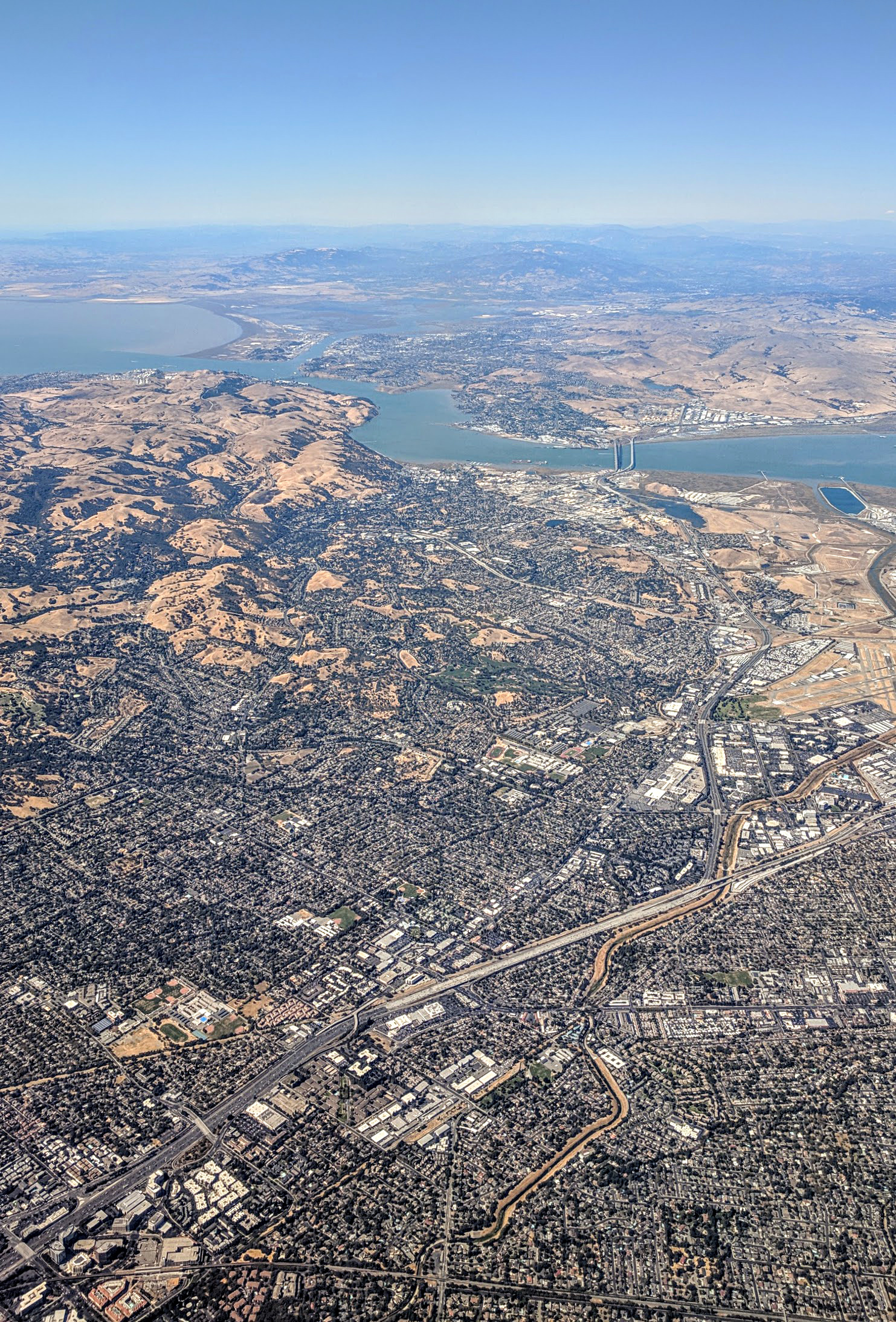
Pleasant Hill, Concord, Martinez, and Vallejo aerial looking north, with I-680, the EBMUD Trail, the Walnut Creek, and the bridges over the Carquinez Strait. I-680 roughly parallels the Walnut Creek (the orange channel) from Walnut Creek to the Carquinez Strait.

The entirety of I-680 is defined in section 620 of the California Streets and Highways Code as Route 680, and that the highway is from:

(a) Route 101 near San Jose to Route 780 at Benicia passing near Warm Springs, Mission San Jose, Scotts Corners, and Sunol, and via Walnut Creek.
(b) Route 780 at Benicia to Route 80 near Cordelia.

This definition roughly corresponds with the Federal Highway Administration (FHWA)'s route logs of I-680.

I-680 begins at US 101 at the Joe Colla Interchange, where it acts as a continuation of I-280 eastward. From here, it begins its journey northward through San Jose, where it meets the Capitol Expressway, signed as County Route G21 (CR G21), about a mile (1.6 km) northeast of I-680's southern terminus. The next exit northbound is SR 130, which is also known as Alum Rock Avenue, unsigned at the intersection. As it continues through Santa Clara County, it meets numerous local roads before interchanging with the Montague Expressway (CR G4). Here, it exits San Jose and enters the city of Milpitas, where it meets SR 237, often referred to as Calaveras Boulevard. After one more intersection, I-680 exits Santa Clara County and enters Alameda County.

In Alameda County, the freeway begins in the city of Fremont, where it intersects SR 262, which was unsigned until 2000. Continuing through the city, it meets Mission Boulevard at SR 238 before exiting the city. Prior to 2002, two ghost ramps existed here, remains of an abandoned freeway project replacing Mission Boulevard. Amid Alameda County, it abruptly turns northeastward and enters a hilly area, where it crosses over Mission Pass, and descends into the Sunol Valley, where it runs concurrently with SR 84 for a short while. Afterward, it enters Pleasanton and intersects with I-580, currently California's longest auxiliary Interstate providing access to Oakland and the Central Valley. It enters Dublin for a short segment before exiting the county and entering Contra Costa County.

Upon entering Contra Costa County, the route meets numerous local roads through the cities of San Ramon, Danville, and Alamo before entering Walnut Creek, where it meets SR 24. I-680 then enters Pleasant Hill for a short time and Concord, where it meets SR 242. Upon exiting Concord, it meets SR 4. It then enters Martinez, where it follows the Benicia–Martinez Bridge over the Carquinez Strait, on which the route crosses the county line and enters Benicia in Solano County. On the Benicia–Martinez Bridge, I-680 northbound is tolled, while I-680 southbound is free. In Benicia, I-680 interchanges with I-780. It then exits the city and, after passing through rural areas, routing parallel to the San Joaquin Delta, it enters Fairfield, where it meets I-80, which is the route's northern terminus.

In the wake of the September 11 attacks, a US flag was painted on a large piece of concrete on a hill along the Sunol Grade. It stayed there for nine years before the California Department of Transportation (Caltrans) painted it over, as the mural had been painted on without authorization.

Of the above names, only the name Sinclair Freeway for its designated portion usually appears on maps, and the other portions on maps are always unnamed, referred to as simply I-680.

I-680 is part of the California Freeway and Expressway System and is part of the National Highway System, a network of highways that are considered essential to the country's economy, defense, and mobility by the Federal Highway Administration (FHWA). I-680 is eligible to be included in the State Scenic Highway System from the Santa Clara–Alameda county line to SR 24 in Walnut Creek but is only a scenic route from Mission Boulevard to the Contra Costa county line and from the Alameda county line to SR 24; this means that those portions are substantial sections of highway passing through a "memorable landscape" with no "visual intrusions", where the potential designation has gained popular favor with the community.

== Tolls ==
=== Express lanes ===
There are two sections of High-occupancy toll (HOT) lanes along I-680: the Sunol Express Lanes and the Contra Costa Express Lanes.

The 14-mile (23 km) southbound Sunol HOT lane along I-680 between SR 84 in Alameda County and through the Sunol Grade to SR 237 in Santa Clara County opened on September 20, 2010. The northbound HOT lane along roughly the same stretch, specifically between SR 84 and Auto Mall Parkway in Fremont, opened in October 2020 but initially as high-occupancy vehicle (HOV) lanes; tolling was halted on this segment of I-680 due to the COVID-19 pandemic and resumed in fall 2022.

The Contra Costa HOT lanes then opened in October 2017 in both directions on the portion from slightly south of Alcosta Boulevard near the Alameda–Contra Costa line to a point between Livorna Road and Rudgear Road near the Alamo–Walnut Creek city limits. On August 20, 2021, the southbound HOT lanes were extended north to Marina Vista Boulevard in Martinez.

As of January 2026, both HOT sections' hours of operation is weekdays between 5:00 am and 8:00 pm; they are otherwise free and open to all vehicles at other times. Solo drivers are tolled using a congestion pricing system based on the real-time levels of traffic. Carpools and motorcycles are not charged. All tolls are collected using an open road tolling system, and therefore there are no toll booths to receive cash. Each vehicle using the HOT lanes is required to carry a FasTrak Flex transponder with its switch set to indicate the number of the vehicle's occupants (1, 2, or 3+). Solo drivers may also use the FasTrak standard tag without the switch. Drivers without any FasTrak tag will be assessed a toll violation regardless of whether they qualified for free.

As of 2020, there are environmental studies to also extend the northbound toll lanes from Livorna Road to Marina Vista Avenue, as well as closing the nine-mile express lane gap between Sunol and San Ramon. Neither have begun construction, nor are there any near plans to do so.

=== Benicia–Martinez Bridge ===
Tolls are collected only for northbound traffic on the Benicia–Martinez Bridge headed to Benicia. All-electronic tolling is also used on the bridge, and they can be paid by either a FasTrak transponder or license plate tolling. The high-occupancy vehicle (HOV) lane leading to the bridge requires a car with three or more people.

== History ==
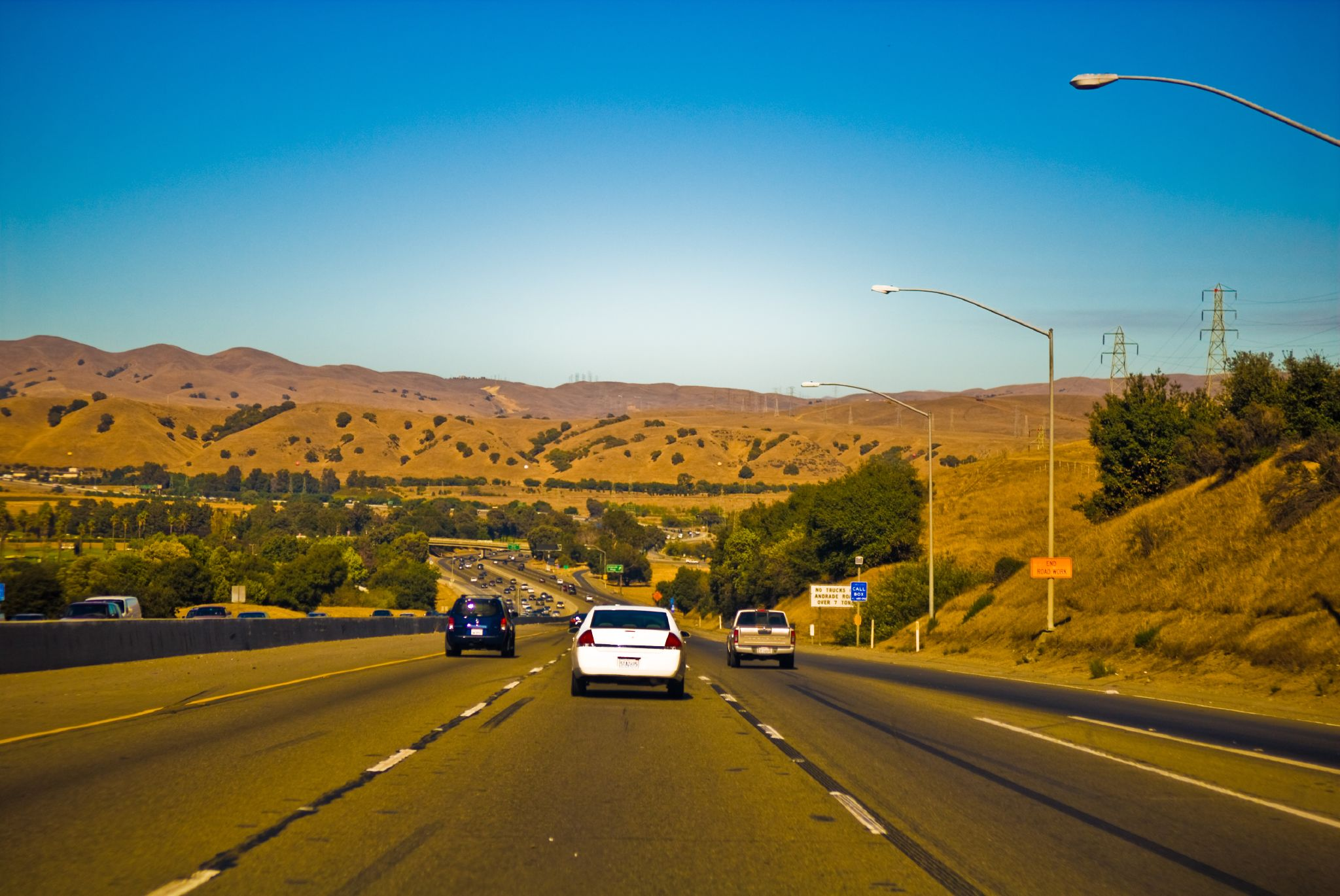
Descending from Mission Pass northbound

=== Historic routing ===
State Route 21
- Location: San Jose - Fairfield
- Existed: 1934–1976

By the 1920s, a road ran south from Martinez through Walnut Creek, Dublin, Danville, and Sunol to Mission San Jose, where it met Legislative Route 5 (Mission Boulevard, signed over the years as US 48, US 101E, SR 9, and now SR 238). It was not yet paved south of Dublin, where it crossed Mission Pass between the Sunol Valley and the San Francisco Bay basin. The majority of this roadway was added to the state highway system in 1933 as portions of several routes: Route 108 from Mission San Jose to Sunol, Route 107 from Sunol to Walnut Creek, and Route 75 from Walnut Creek to Pleasant Hill.

At Martinez, the Martinez–Benicia Ferry took automobiles across the Carquinez Strait to Benicia, where Route 7, one of the original state highways from the 1910 bond issue, led north and northeast past Fairfield toward Sacramento and Oregon. The portion north from Benicia to Fairfield became part of Route 74 in 1935, when Route 7 was realigned to the more direct American Canyon route that is now I-80. None of the aforementioned roads were given state sign route numbers in 1934, when that system was laid out, but, by 1937, they had been numbered SR 21. This route began at the intersection of Warm Springs Boulevard and Brown Road in Warm Springs, where Route 5 and Route 69 (SR 17) split, followed Route 5 along Mission Boulevard to Mission San Jose (this part later became a concurrency with SR 9), and then continued to US 40 (Route 7) at Cordelia. The routing was very close to the present I-680, following such roads as Pleasanton Sunol Road, San Ramon Valley Boulevard, Danville Boulevard, Main Street in Walnut Creek, Contra Costa Boulevard, and Pacheco Boulevard.

The portion of SR 21 between Pleasant Hill and Martinez was finally added to the state highway system in 1949, as a branch of Route 75. The ferry approach in Benicia became a spur of Route 74 in 1947, and, in 1953, it was transferred to Route 75. The same law, effective immediately as an urgency measure, authorized the Department of Public Works to acquire the ferry system, then operated by the city of Martinez, which was planning to shut it down. Ownership was transferred just after midnight on October 6, 1953.

=== History as an Interstate ===
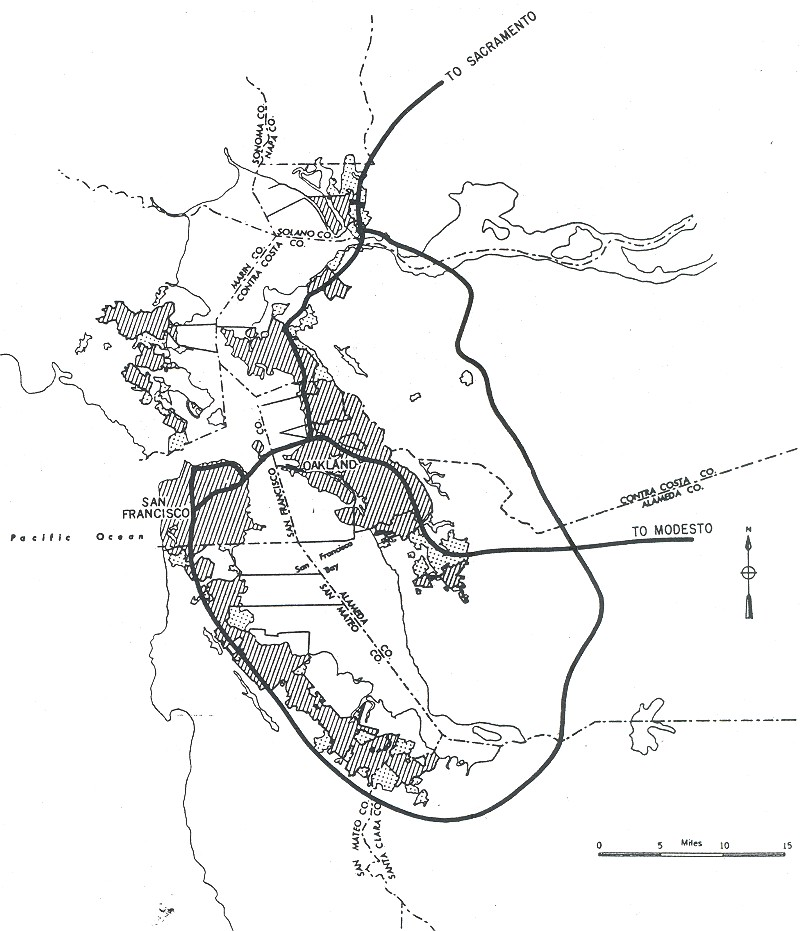
1955 map of the planned Interstates in the San Francisco Bay Area. These early plans essentially called for an Interstate loop route that would head south down the San Francisco Peninsula from San Francisco to San Jose, then head north through the eastern cities of the East Bay to Vallejo. This route now basically comprises present-day I-280, I-680, and I-780.

The Bureau of Public Roads approved urban routes of the Interstate Highway System on September 15, 1955, including a loop around the San Francisco Bay, soon numbered I-280 and I-680. The east half (I-680) began at the interchange of US 101 north of Downtown San Jose and followed the Nimitz Freeway (SR 17/Route 69, now I-880) to the split at Warm Springs (the present location of SR 262), SR 21 to Benicia, and Route 74 (no sign route number) to I-80 in Vallejo. The first piece of I-680 freeway built, other than the preexisting Nimitz Freeway, was in the late 1950s, along the SR 24 overlap between North Main Street in Walnut Creek and Monument Boulevard in Pleasant Hill. A southerly extension, bypassing downtown Walnut Creek to South Main Street, opened on March 22, 1960, connecting with the SR 24 freeway to Oakland. In the next decade, the freeway was completed from Vallejo south to SR 238 at Mission San Jose, and the roadway north from Benicia to Fairfield, which became the only remaining piece of SR 21, was also upgraded to freeway standards.

In the 1964 state highway renumbering, the legislative designation was changed to Route 680. SR 17 was officially moved to former Route 5 between San Jose and Warm Springs, which had not had a signed designation since the Nimitz Freeway (then I-680) was constructed, but this was instead marked as part of SR 238 (which replaced SR 9 north of Mission San Jose), and SR 17 remained signed along the Nimitz Freeway. This was very short-lived, as the Bureau of Public Roads approved a shift in the south end of I-680 in October 1964. The legislature changed the routes in 1965, swapping Route 17 and Route 680 south of Warm Springs and creating a new SR 262 on the short roadway at Warm Springs where they had overlapped to switch sides. However, until I-680 was completed in the early-to-mid 1970s, it remained signed along the Nimitz Freeway, and the old road between San Jose and Warm Springs continued to be marked as SR 238. One more change was made to the routing of I-680: in July 1973, the remainder of SR 21, from Benicia to Fairfield, was added to the Interstate Highway System. This became the new alignment of I-680, and the old route to Vallejo became I-780. The corresponding changes were made by the state legislature in 1976. Because the approximate 12.5-mile (20.1 km) segment from Benicia to Fairfield was completed without federal Interstate funding when it was still SR 21, it is designated as a "non-chargable", 23 U.S.C. § 103(c)(4)(A) Interstate.

== Exit list ==
County	Location	mi	km	Exit	Destinations	Notes
Santa Clara	San Jose	0.00	0.00	1A	I-280 north (Sinclair Freeway west) – Downtown San Jose	Southern terminus; Joe Colla Interchange; southern terminus of I-280; US 101 north exit 384, south exit 385B; Sinclair Freeway continues west as I-280 north
Santa Clara	San Jose	0.00	0.00	1B	US 101 (Bayshore Freeway) – Los Angeles, San Francisco	Southern terminus; Joe Colla Interchange; southern terminus of I-280; US 101 north exit 384, south exit 385B; Sinclair Freeway continues west as I-280 north
Santa Clara	San Jose	0.39	0.63	1A	King Road	Signed as exit 1C southbound
Santa Clara	San Jose	1.19	1.92	1B	Jackson Avenue	Northbound exit and southbound entrance
Santa Clara	San Jose	1.41	2.27	1C	Capitol Expressway (CR G21)	Signed as exit 1B southbound
Santa Clara	San Jose	1.74	2.80	2A	Alum Rock Avenue	No ramp from Alum Rock Avenue east to I-680 south; former SR 130
Santa Clara	San Jose	2.38	3.83	2B	McKee Road	
Santa Clara	San Jose	3.84	6.18	4	Berryessa Road	
Santa Clara	San Jose	4.78– 5.07	7.69– 8.16	5	Capitol Avenue / Hostetter Road	Signed as exits 5A (Hostetter Road) and 5B (Capitol Avenue) northbound
Santa Clara	San Jose–Milpitas line	6.17	9.93	6	Montague Expressway (CR G4) / Landess Avenue	
Santa Clara	Milpitas			—	I-680 Sunol Express Lane south ends	South end of southbound Express Lane
Santa Clara	Milpitas	7.65	12.31	8	SR 237 west (Calaveras Boulevard) – Central Milpitas	Eastern terminus of SR 237; SR 237 east exits 11A-B
Santa Clara	Milpitas	8.50	13.68	9	Jacklin Road	
Santa Clara–Alameda county line	Milpitas–Fremont line	9.94	16.00	North end of Sinclair Freeway		
Santa Clara–Alameda county line	Milpitas–Fremont line	10.06	16.19	10	Scott Creek Road – Warm Springs District	
Alameda	Fremont	12.32	19.83	12	SR 262 west (Mission Boulevard) to I-880	Eastern terminus of SR 262; former SR 21 north
Alameda	Fremont			—	I-680 Sunol Express Lane north begins	South end of northbound Express Lane
Alameda	Fremont	13.95	22.45	14	Auto Mall Parkway, Durham Road	
Alameda	Fremont	15.31	24.64	15	Washington Boulevard – Irvington District	
Alameda	Fremont	16.33	26.28	16	SR 238 north (Mission Boulevard)	Southern terminus of SR 238; former SR 21 south
Alameda	Fremont	17.54	28.23	18	Vargas Road	Signed as exit 18A northbound
Alameda				Mission Pass		
Alameda		18.37– 19.77	29.56– 31.82	20	Andrade Road, Sheridan Road	Signed as exits 18B (Sheridan Road) and 20 (Andrade Road) northbound
Alameda		18.37– 19.77	29.56– 31.82	Weigh station (northbound only)		
Alameda				—	I-680 Sunol Express Lanes	North end of Express Lanes in both directions
Alameda		21.10	33.96	21A	SR 84 west / Calaveras Road – Sunol, Dumbarton Bridge	South end of SR 84 overlap (northbound only); signed as exit 21 southbound; former SR 21 north
Alameda		21.38	34.41	21B	SR 84 east – Livermore	North end of SR 84 overlap (northbound only); southbound exit is via a U-turn at exit 21
Alameda		21.98	35.37	22	Sunol (Koopman Road)	Southbound exit and northbound entrance; former SR 21
Alameda	Pleasanton	24.80	39.91	25	Sunol Boulevard, Castlewood Drive – Pleasanton	to
Alameda	Pleasanton	26.29	42.31	26	Bernal Avenue – Pleasanton	
Alameda	Pleasanton	28.84	46.41	29	Stoneridge Drive	
Alameda	Pleasanton–Dublin line	29.60	47.64	30	I-580 / Dublin Boulevard – Dublin, Oakland, Stockton	Signed as exits 30A (east) and 30B (west) northbound; I-580 exit 44B; Dublin Boulevard (formerly US 50) is not signed northbound
Contra Costa	San Ramon			—	I-680 Contra Costa Express Lanes	South end of Express Lanes in both directions
Contra Costa	San Ramon	31.43	50.58	31	Alcosta Boulevard – Dublin	
Contra Costa	San Ramon	34.30	55.20	34	Bollinger Canyon Road	
Contra Costa	San Ramon–Danville line	35.60	57.29	36	Crow Canyon Road – San Ramon	
Contra Costa	Danville	38.16	61.41	38	Sycamore Valley Road	
Contra Costa	Danville	38.95	62.68	39	Diablo Road – Danville	
Contra Costa	Danville	39.57– 40.14	63.68– 64.60	40	El Cerro Boulevard, El Pintado Road	Signed as exits 40A (El Cerro Boulevard) and 40B (El Pintado Road) southbound
Contra Costa	Alamo	41.76	67.21	42	Stone Valley Road	Signed as exits 42A (east) and 42B (west)
Contra Costa	Alamo	42.67	68.67	43	Livorna Road	
Contra Costa				—	I-680 Contra Costa Express Lane north ends	North end of northbound Express Lane
Contra Costa	Walnut Creek	44.01	70.83	44	Rudgear Road	No southbound exit
Contra Costa	Walnut Creek	44.58	71.74	45A	South Main Street – Walnut Creek	No northbound entrance; former SR 21
Contra Costa	Walnut Creek	45.43	73.11	45B	Olympic Boulevard	
Contra Costa	Walnut Creek	45.88	73.84	46A	SR 24 west – Lafayette, Oakland	Signed as exit 46 southbound; eastern terminus of SR 24; SR 24 exits 15A-B
Contra Costa	Walnut Creek	46.36	74.61	46B	Ygnacio Valley Road	Northbound exit and southbound entrance
Contra Costa	Walnut Creek	47.11	75.82	47	North Main Street – Walnut Creek	Former SR 21
Contra Costa	Walnut Creek	47.90	77.09	48	Treat Boulevard, Geary Road	Southbound former Oak Park Boulevard exit; serves weigh station
Contra Costa	Pleasant Hill	48.86	78.63	49A	Contra Costa Boulevard – Pleasant Hill	Northbound exit and southbound entrance; former SR 21
Contra Costa	Pleasant Hill	49.17	79.13	49B	Monument Boulevard, Gregory Lane	Single-point urban interchange; signed as exit 49 southbound; former SR 24 east
Contra Costa	Concord–Pleasant Hill line	50.21	80.81	50	SR 242 north – Concord, Pittsburg	Northbound exit and southbound entrance; southern terminus of SR 242; SR 242 south exit 1A
Contra Costa	Concord–Pleasant Hill line	50.74	81.66	51	Willow Pass Road, Taylor Boulevard	
Contra Costa	Concord–Pleasant Hill line	51.56	82.98	52	Concord Avenue, Burnett Avenue – Pacheco, Concord	
Contra Costa		52.89	85.12	53	SR 4 – Pittsburg, Antioch, Martinez, Hercules	SR 4 exits 12B-C
Contra Costa		54.13	87.11	54	Pacheco Boulevard, Arthur Road	Former SR 21
Contra Costa	Martinez			—	I-680 Contra Costa Express Lane south begins	North end of southbound Express Lane
Contra Costa	Martinez	55.96	90.06	56	Marina Vista Road, Waterfront Road – Martinez	Last free exit for northbound traffic
Carquinez Strait		57.22	92.09	Benicia–Martinez Bridge (northbound toll only)		
Solano	Benicia	58.27	93.78	58A	I-780 west – Benicia, Vallejo	Signed as exit 58 southbound; former I-680 north; eastern terminus of I-780; I-780 exits 7A-B
Solano	Benicia	59.09	95.10	58B	Bayshore Road	Northbound exit and southbound entrance
Solano	Benicia	59.55	95.84	60	Industrial Park	Southbound exit and northbound entrance
Solano	Benicia	60.91	98.03	61	Lake Herman Road	Former SR 21 south
Solano		63.11	101.57	63	Parish Road	
Solano		65.41	105.27	65	Marshview Road	
Solano	Fairfield	68.11	109.61	68	Gold Hill Road	
Solano	Fairfield	69.99	112.64	70	Green Valley Road – Cordelia	Northbound exit and southbound entrance
Solano	Fairfield	70.48	113.43	71A	I-80 east / SR 12 east – Fairfield, Sacramento	Northern terminus; I-80 exit 40
Solano	Fairfield	70.48	113.43	71B	I-80 west / SR 12 west – Napa, San Francisco	Northern terminus; I-80 exit 40
1.000 mi = 1.609 km; 1.000 km = 0.621 mi: Concurrency terminus; Electronic toll collection; Incomplete access; Route transition
