= California State Route 262 =

Highway in California

State Route 262
- Mission Boulevard
- SR 262 highlighted in red

Route information
- Maintained by Caltrans
- Length: 1.070 mi (1.722 km)
- Existed: 2000–present
- History: 1965–2000 (unsigned)

Major junctions
- West end: I-880 in Fremont
- East end: I-680 in Fremont

Location
- Country: United States
- State: California
- Counties: Alameda

Highway system
- State highways in California; Interstate; US; State; Scenic; History; Pre‑1964; Unconstructed; Deleted; Freeways
← SR 261	→ SR 263

State Route 262 (SR 262) is a state highway entirely within the Warm Springs District of Fremont, California. It runs along the 1.07-mile (1.72 km) segment of Mission Boulevard between I-880 to the west and I-680 to the east. The route is heavily trafficked, going through a commercial district and containing at least two stop lights.

== Route description ==
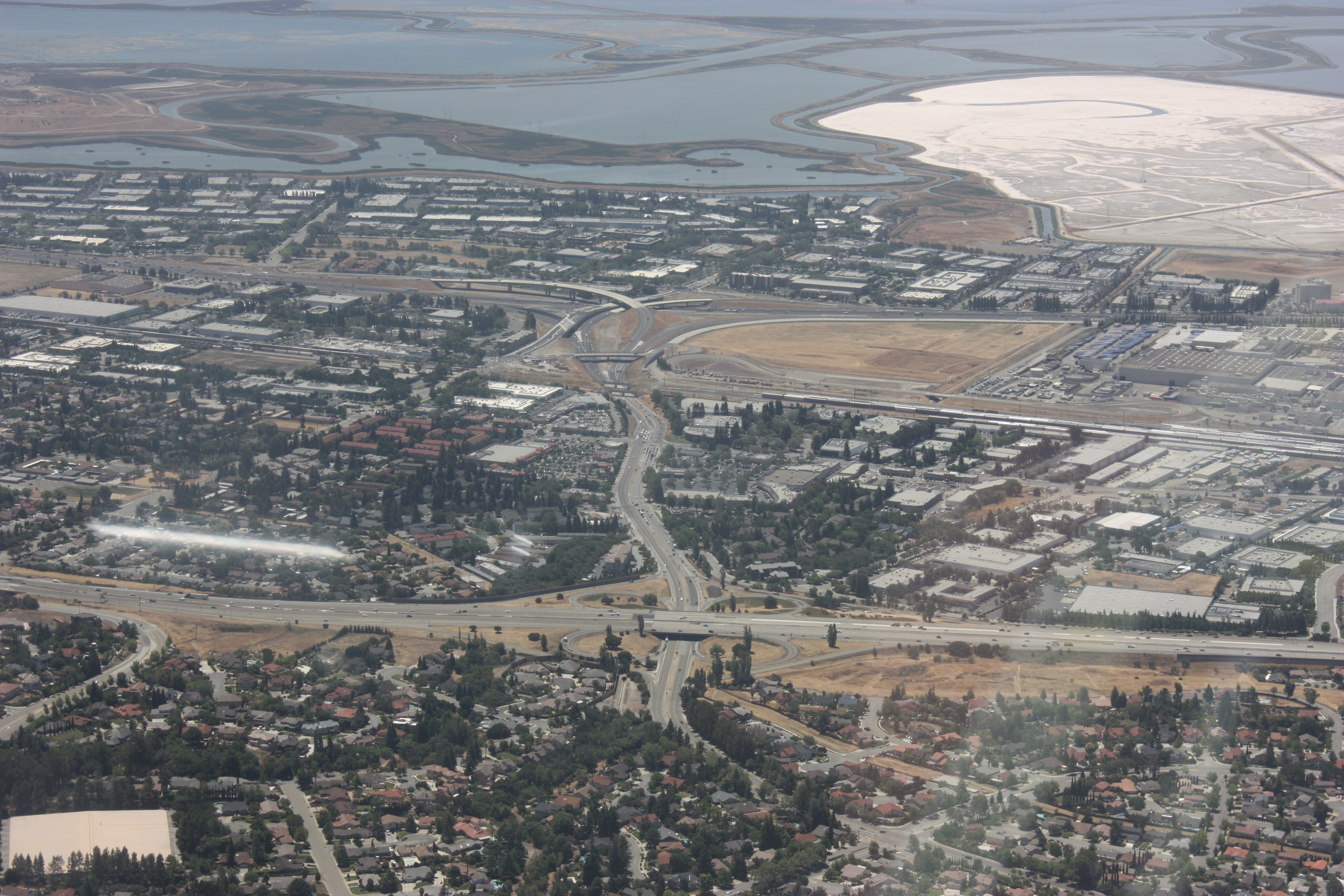
Aerial photo of Route 262 from the east

Route 262 is defined in section 562 of the California Streets and Highways Code, and that the highway is "from Route 880 to Route 680 near Warm Springs".

SR 262 begins at its western interchange with Interstate 880 in Fremont. It travels 1-mile (1.6 km) east to its terminus and junction with Interstate 680 in Fremont. SR 262 was built solely to be a link between the two interstates and lies at the point that Interstates 880 and 680 are closest together in the East Bay. 2 miles (3.2 km) north of SR 262, I-680 abruptly turns to the Northeast and into the Sunol and Livermore Valley thus making SR 262 a vital link between those valleys and the Silicon Valley to the south.

Physically SR 262 begins as a 6 lane road that has been built to freeway standards for its first half mile and after intersecting Kato Road and Warren Avenue with separated grade intersections built in 2008 and 2015, respectively. The remaining half mile is a 4-6 lane city street with two traffic lights at Warm Springs Boulevard and Mohave Drive before terminating at a cloverleaf interchange at I-680.

SR 262 was unsigned along its entire route and would be unnoticeable to the public if not for two guide signs placed in the early 2000s on south I-680 that designate the exit as "SR 262 to I-880 Mission Blvd". There is no other signage on I-880 that designates the road by its route number. Signage for the southbound I-680 toll express lane, opened in September 2010, indicates an exit at "262 - Mission Blvd." Locals are largely unaware of the route designation and refer to the road as Mission Boulevard exclusively. Street signage of Route 262 appeared in 2018 at Warm Springs Boulevard. In 2021, signage for Route 262 was placed in the westbound (southbound) direction of Mission Boulevard between I-680 and Warm Springs Boulevard.

SR 262 is part of the National Highway System, a network of highways that are considered essential to the country's economy, defense, and mobility by the Federal Highway Administration.

== History ==
Originally SR 262 was slated to run the route of present-day Oakland Road from San Jose to where present day Warm Springs and Mission Boulevards intersect. This plan was scrapped when State Route 17 (later I-880) was constructed. SR 262 was subsequently routed along its present route.

One planning option was for SR 262 to be deleted from the state route list when State Route 237 to the south was completed between I-880 and I-680; under section 562 of the California Streets and Highways Code, SR 262 would cease to be a state highway if that section of SR 237 is upgraded to a freeway. However, there is no longer room between the developed areas to build SR 237 into a freeway there.

SR 262 is also a signed section of the Juan Bautista De Anza National Historic Trail.

== Major intersections ==
Except where prefixed with a letter, postmiles were measured on the road as it was in 1964, based on the alignment that existed at the time, and do not necessarily reflect current mileage. Postmile prefixes include: R reflecting a realignment in the route since then, M indicating a second realignment, L referring to an overlap due to a correction or change, and T indicating postmiles classified as temporary. Segments that remain unconstructed or have been relinquished to local control may be omitted. The entire route is in Fremont, Alameda County.

Postmile	Exit	Destinations	Notes
R0.00		I-880 (Nimitz Freeway) – Oakland, San Jose	Southbound exit and northbound entrance; south end of SR 262; former SR 17; I-880 exit 12
		Gateway Boulevard	Closed; former southbound exit and entrance
R0.39	1	Kato Road	Southbound exit and northbound entrance, opened in 2015
	East end of freeway		
R0.70		Warm Springs Boulevard – Irvington District, Warm Springs District	
R1.07		I-680 – Sacramento, Milpitas	Interchange; east end of SR 262; I-680 exit 12
R1.07		Mission Boulevard	Continuation beyond I-680; former SR 21 north
1.000 mi = 1.609 km; 1.000 km = 0.621 mi: Closed/former; Incomplete access
