= San Francisco Bay Trail =

Bicycle and pedestrian trail

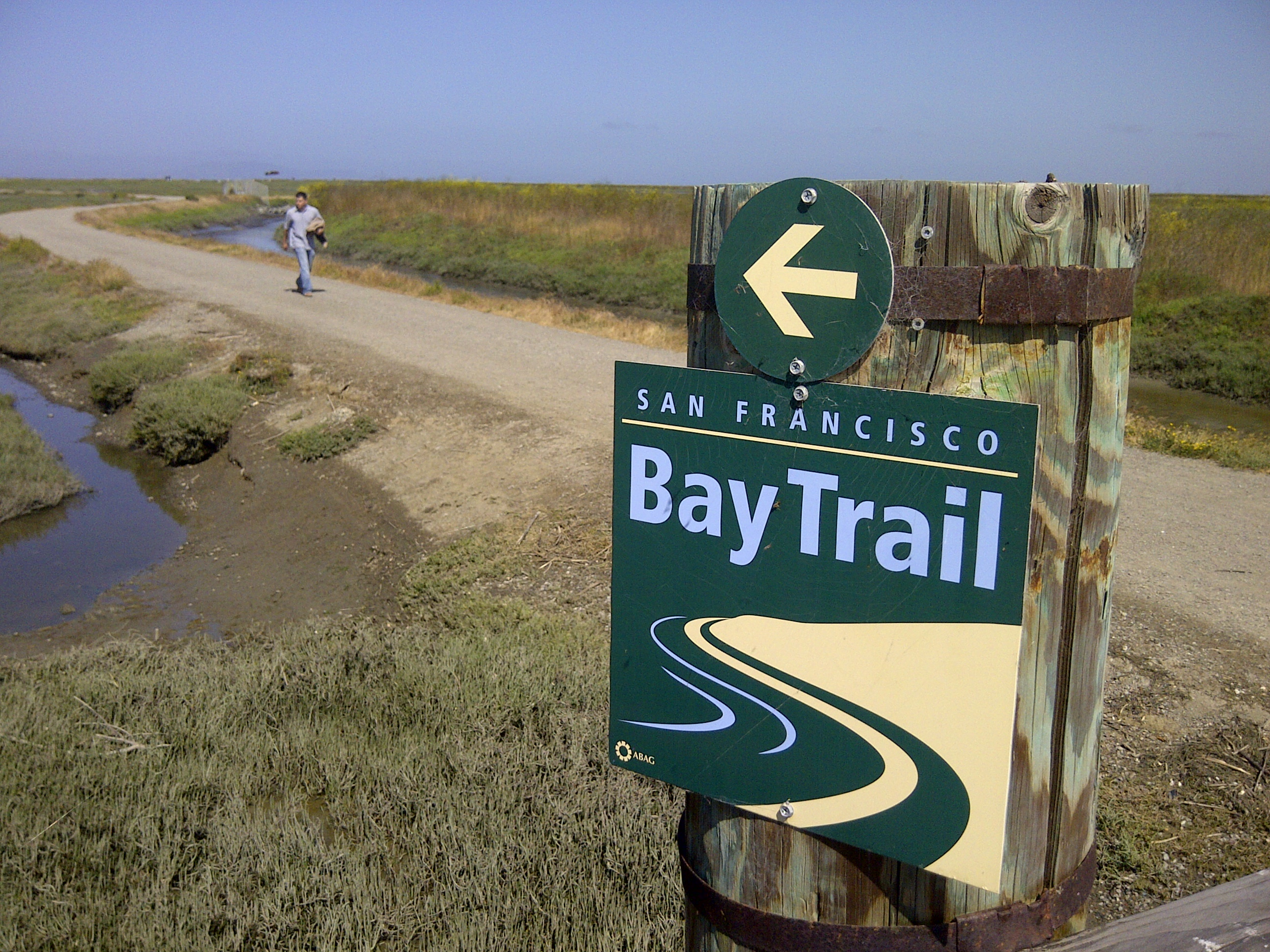
- San Francisco Bay Trail in Hayward Regional Shoreline showing trail marker
- Length: 356 mi (573 km)
- Location: San Francisco Bay Area, United States
- Use: Hiking, Bicycling, Jogging, Rollerblading, Birdwatching, Environmental Education
- Waymark: Yes, continuous shoreline trail around San Francisco and San Pablo Bays

The San Francisco Bay Trail is a bicycle and pedestrian trail that when finished will allow continuous travel around the shoreline of San Francisco Bay. As of 2020, 356 miles (573 km) of the trail have been completed. When finished, the trail will be over 500 miles (800 km) of paved and gravel paths, bike lanes, and sidewalks, linking 47 cities across nine counties and crossing seven toll bridges. It was a project of the Association of Bay Area Governments (ABAG) and the Metropolitan Transportation Commission (MTC), in collaboration with other agencies, private companies, non-profit organizations, and advocacy groups. As of 2026, the project has been transitioned to Save The Bay, a non-profit based out of Oakland, CA.

The trail is intended to provide recreation for hikers and bicyclists, viewpoints for wildlife, space for environmental education, and corridors for bicycle transportation as well as access to historic, natural and cultural sites, including over 130 parks.

== Route ==
San Francisco Bay Trail alignment as of 2019

The Bay Trail is an interconnected trail system that links parks, open spaces, points of interest, and communities on or near the bay shoreline. It will not only encircle the Bay but will also provide access inland to open spaces and preserves, streams, and the Bay Area Ridge Trail, which forms the second of two concentric rings around the bay.

Sections of the Bay Trail exist in all nine Bay Area counties. The longest continuous segments include 26 miles (42 km) primarily on gravel levees between East Palo Alto and San Jose in Santa Clara County; 25 miles (40 km) in San Mateo County between Millbrae and San Carlos; 17 miles (27 km) in central Alameda County from San Leandro to Hayward; and 15 miles (24 km) along the shoreline and on city streets through Richmond in Contra Costa County. The northernmost trail section passes through San Pablo Bay National Wildlife Refuge.

Protected bicycle and pedestrian lanes exist on six Bay Area toll bridges: Golden Gate Bridge, Carquinez Bridge, Benicia-Martinez Bridge, Dumbarton Bridge, the Richmond-San Rafael Bridge, and the Bay Bridge. In the last case, the path cannot be used to cross the bay, as the western span lacks a bike path. The San Mateo–Hayward Bridge, the longest bridge in California, currently lacks a pedestrian or bike path entirely.

== History ==
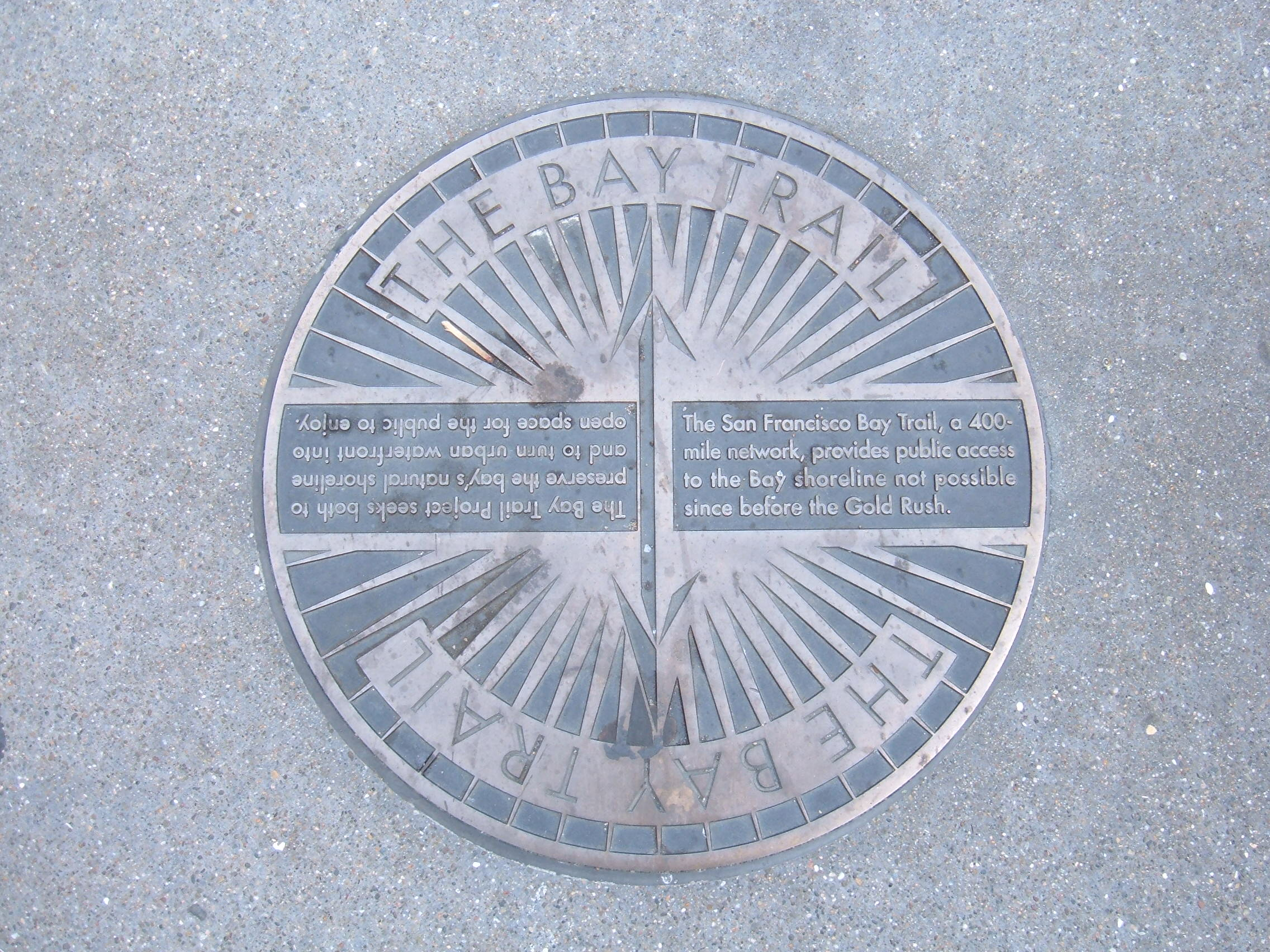
Bay Trail plaque, Embarcadero, SF

The idea for the Bay Trail was launched in the Fall of 1986, when state Senator Bill Lockyer (D-Hayward) was having lunch with a local editor in a waterfront restaurant. The end-of-session legislative frenzy was over, and Senator Lockyer was in a reflective mood. “Let me try this idea out on you,” he said to his companion. “What if we tried to develop a pedestrian and bicycle path around the bay, with access to the shoreline?” His luncheon partner applauded the idea and urged the senator to pursue it. The outcome was Senate Bill 100. Coauthored by all Bay Area legislators, the bill passed. It defined parameters of the planning process, designated the Association of Bay Area Governments (ABAG) as the lead agency, and provided $300,000 for the preparation of a Bay Trail Plan by July 1, 1989. The Bay Trail Plan, adopted by ABAG, shows a network of trails that meander and loop along the shore, connecting all nine surrounding counties and crossing the region's toll bridges.

== Publications ==
=== San Francisco Bay Shoreline Guide ===
The San Francisco Bay Shoreline Guide was revised in 2012. It provides information about the natural and cultural history of San Francisco Bay and includes maps for 325 miles of the shoreline Bay Trail open to the public. Published by University of California Press for the California Coastal Conservancy.

=== San Francisco Bay Trail Maps ===
The San Francisco Bay Trail maps were released in May 2013 and last updated in 2018. The box set of 25 cards and a large fold-out map provide detailed information about the trail and points of interest along its route. Production of the maps was funded in part by the California Coastal Conservancy.

=== The Bay Trail Plan ===
The San Francisco Bay Trail Plan: A Recreational Ring Around San Francisco Bay was published in 1989 by the Association of Bay Area Governments. The plan includes the trail alignment, project goals, policies and implementation strategies for the Bay Trail.

== Gallery ==
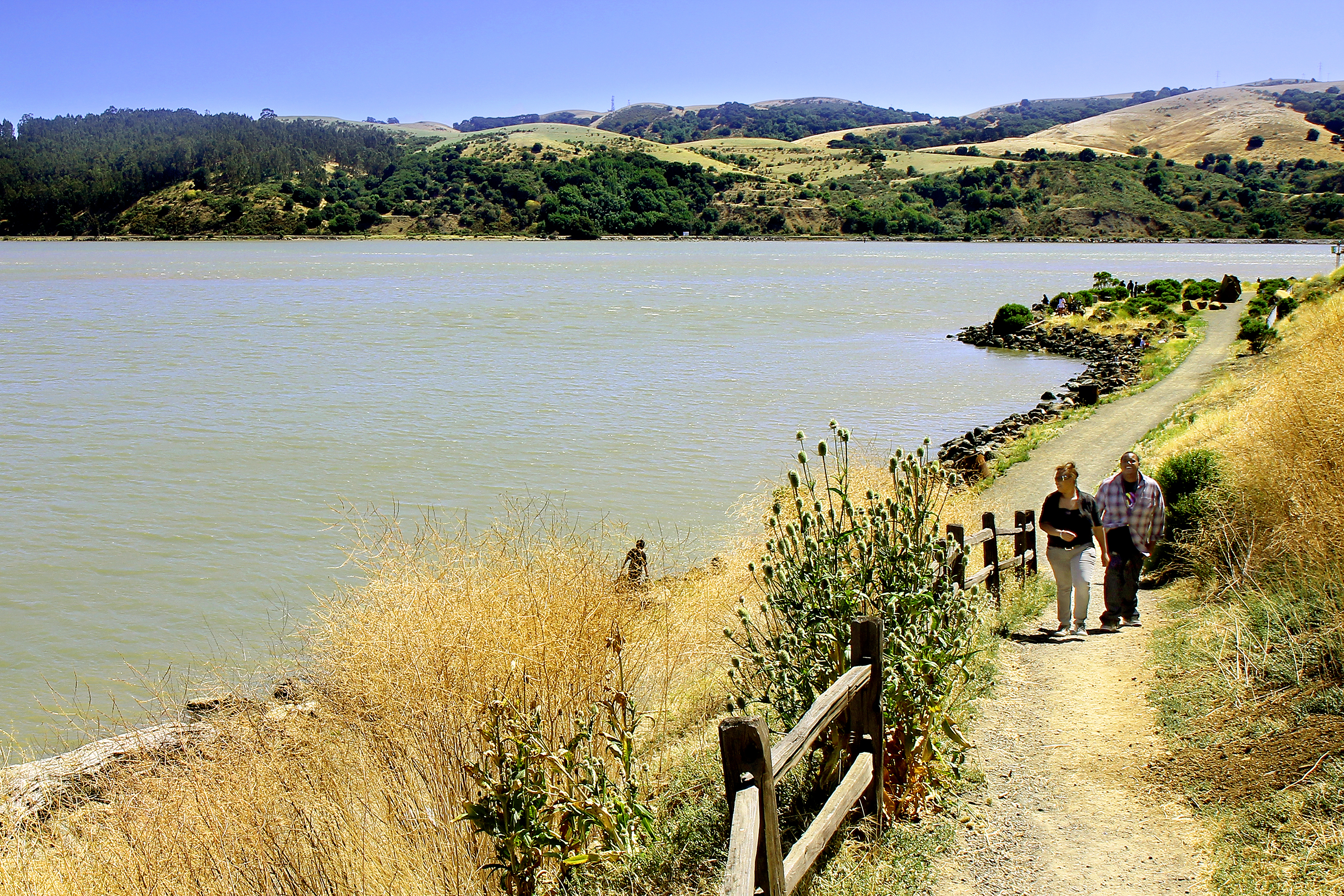
The Carquinez Strait in Benicia State Recreation Area

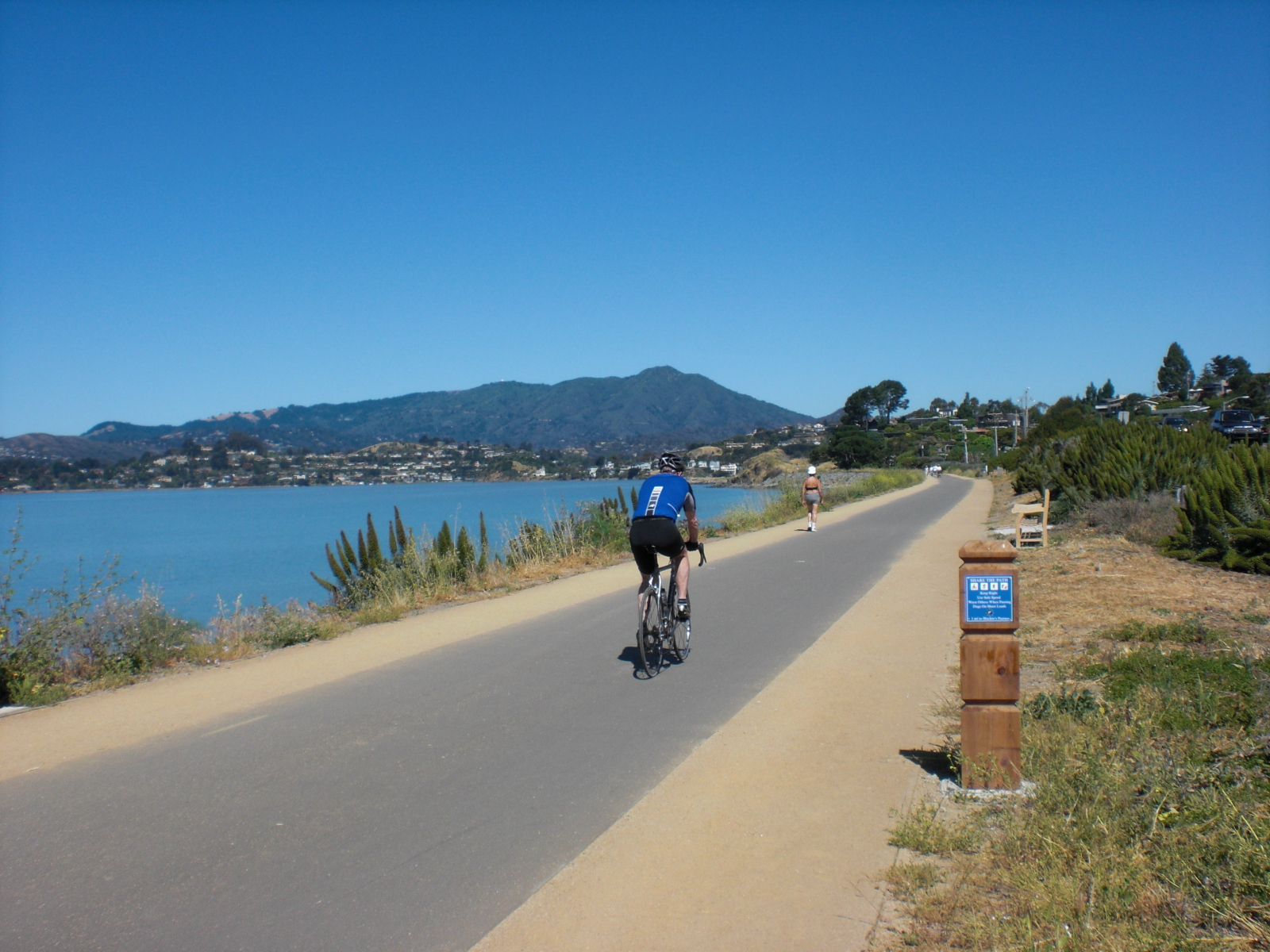
The path in Tiburon with view of Mount Tamalpais

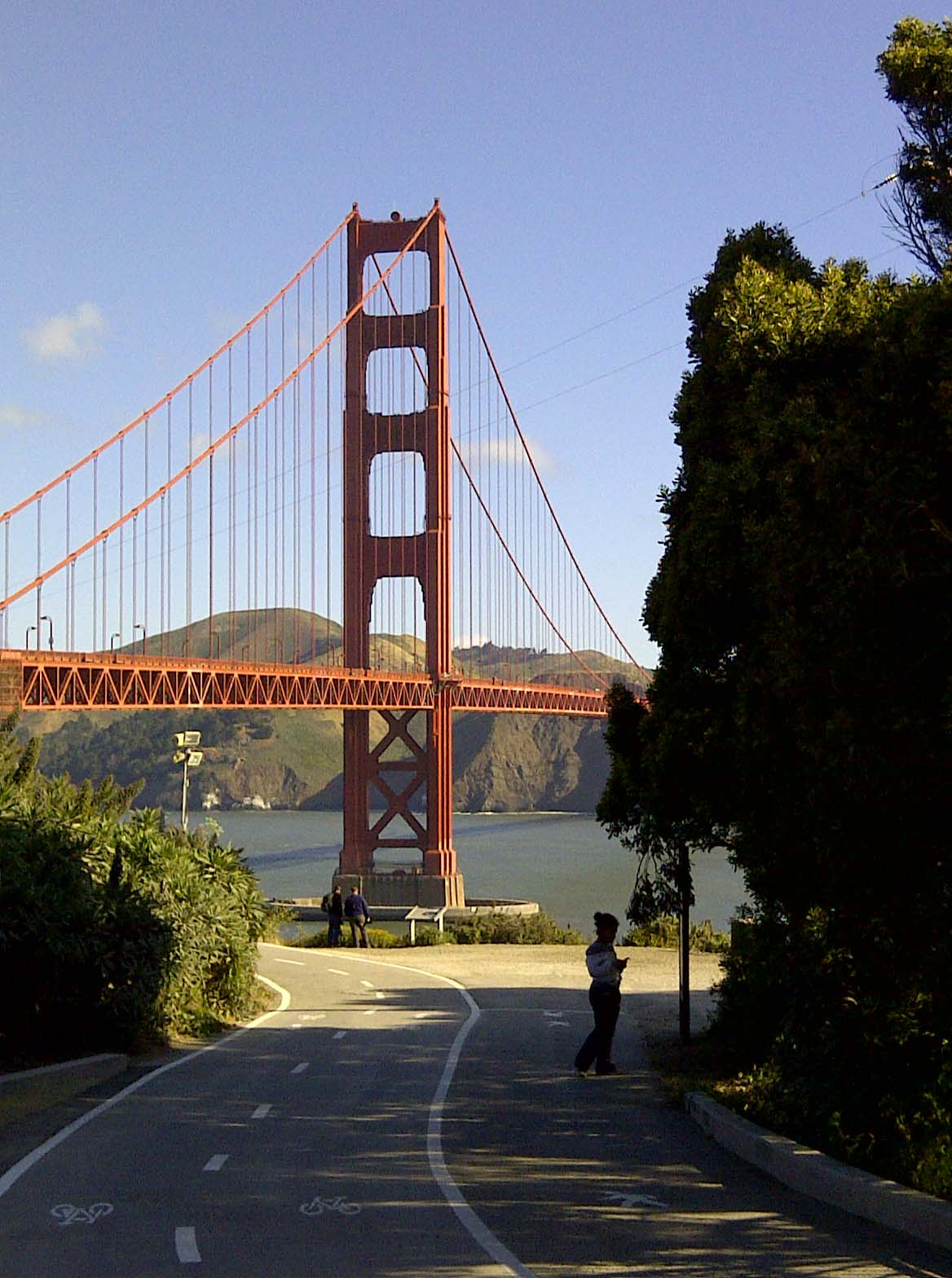
Trail with the Golden Gate Bridge

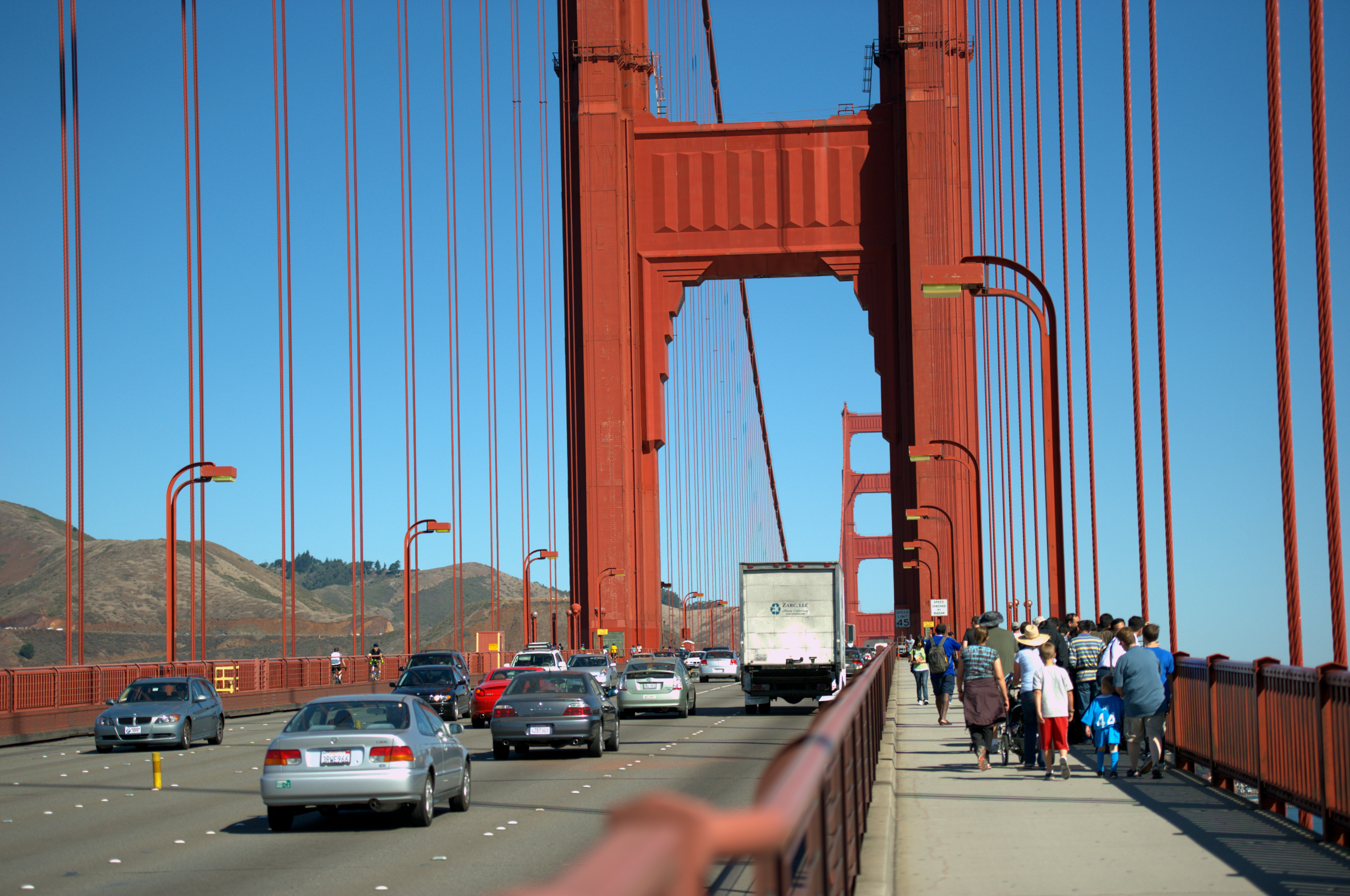
Walking on the Golden Gate bridge

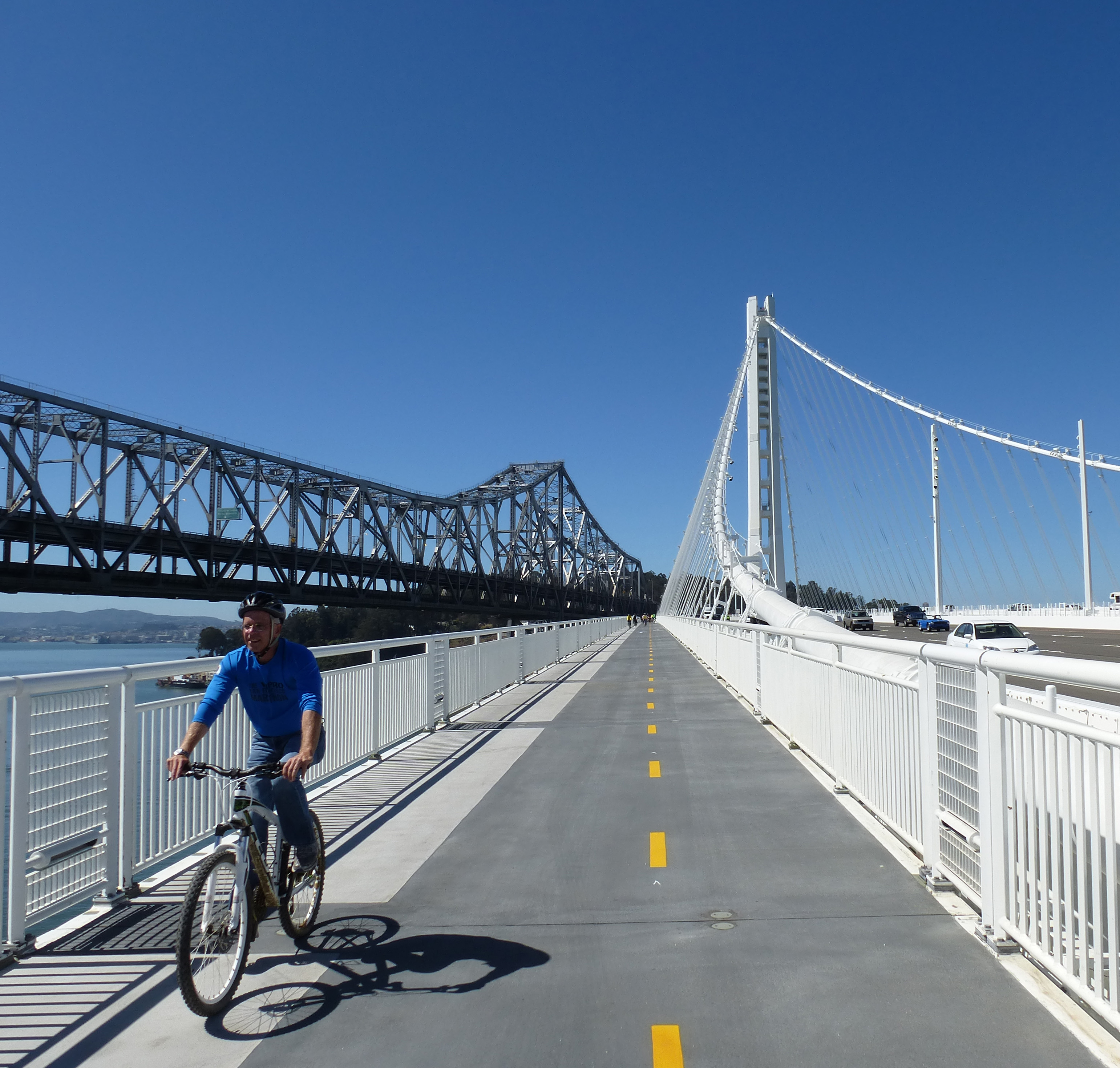
Bicyclist on the Bay Bridge Trail

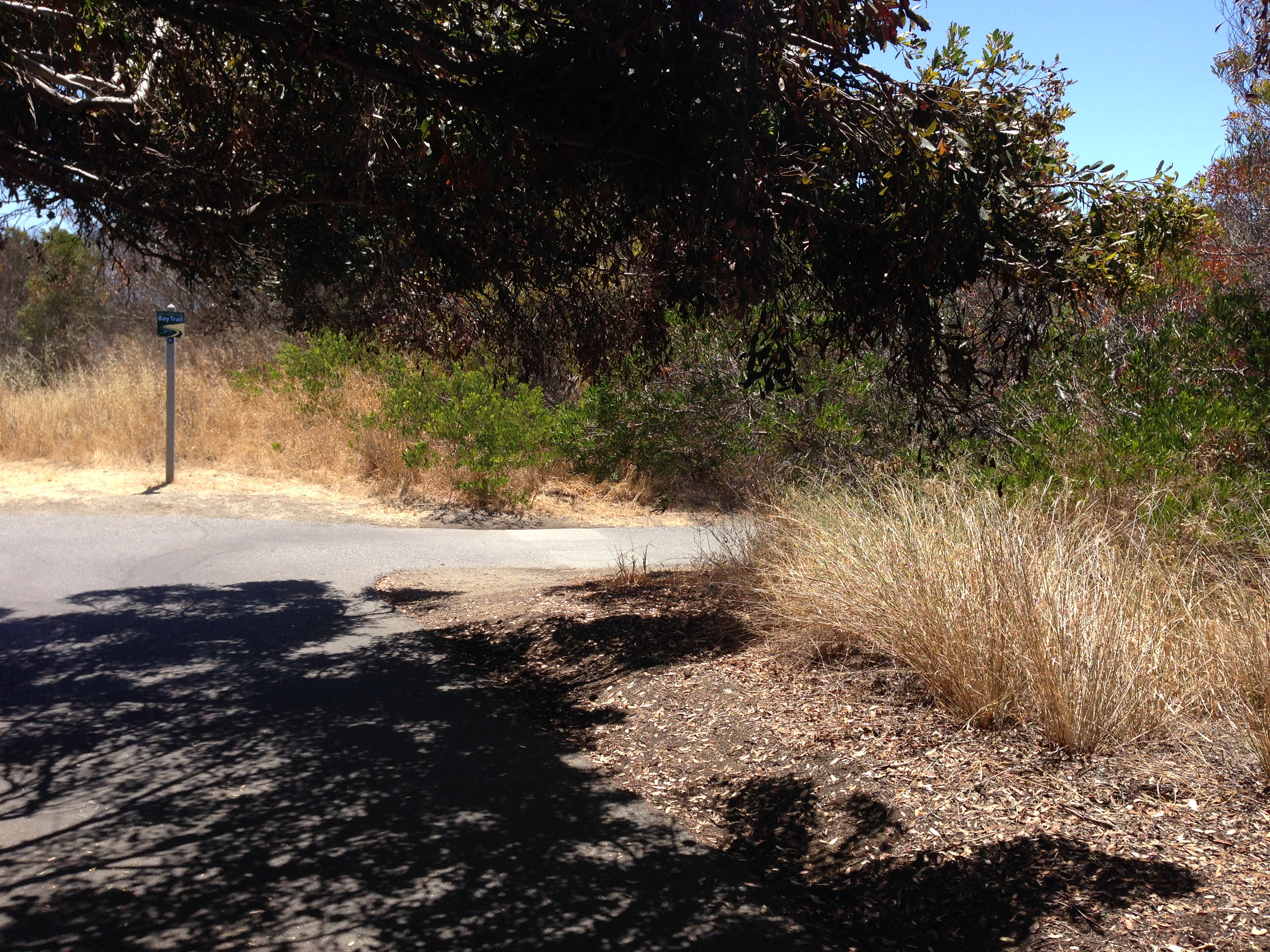
San Francisco Bay Trail in Shoreline Park, Mountain View showing trail marker.

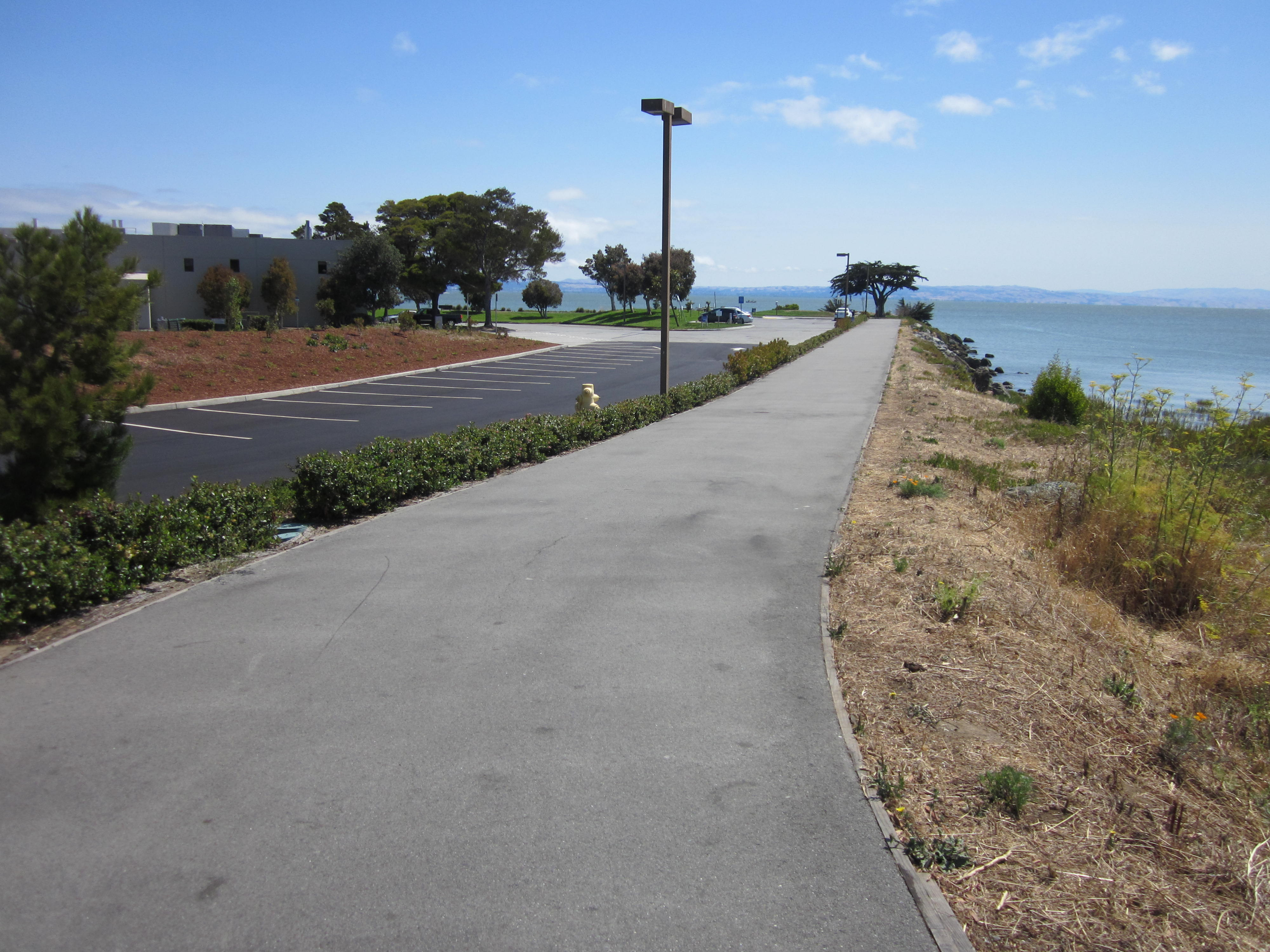
Bay Trail near Genentech headquarters in South San Francisco, California

== See also ==
- Bay Area Ridge Trail
- San Francisco Bay Area Water Trail, a proposal to create a safely navigable water "trail" for nonmotorized beachable watercraft, circumnavigating the bay.
