= Interstate 780 =

Interstate Highway in California

Interstate 780
- I-780 highlighted in red

Route information
- Auxiliary route of I-80
- Maintained by Caltrans
- Length: 6.5 mi (10.5 km)
- Existed: 1973-1976–present
- History: State highway in 1935; Interstate (as I-680) in 1955; renumbered I-780 in 1973–76
- NHS: Entire route

Major junctions
- West end: I-80 in Vallejo
- East end: I-680 in Benicia

Location
- Country: United States
- State: California
- Counties: Solano

Highway system
- Interstate Highway System; Main; Auxiliary; Suffixed; Business; Future; State highways in California; Interstate; US; State; Scenic; History; Pre‑1964; Unconstructed; Deleted; Freeways
← I-710	→ I-805

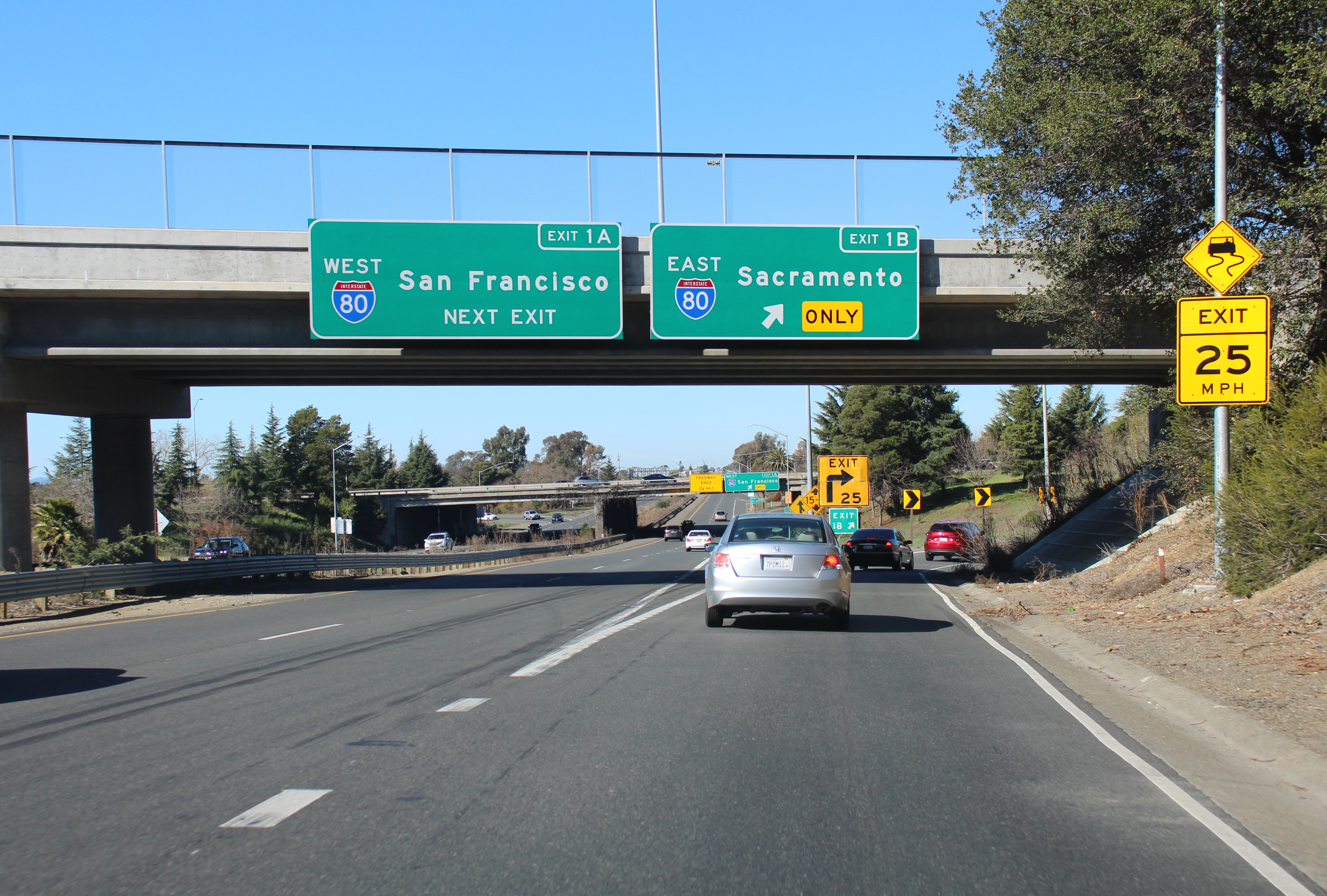
Western end of Interstate 780 at the interchange with Interstate 80 in Vallejo

Interstate 780 (I-780) is an east–west auxiliary Interstate Highway in the San Francisco Bay Area of Northern California. It runs from the intersection of Curtola Parkway and Lemon Street in Vallejo east to I-680 just north of the Benicia–Martinez Bridge in Benicia. It closely parallels the Carquinez Strait for its entire route. Originally, this segment was part of I-680 before that Interstate was extended and rerouted to Fairfield. The city-maintained Curtola Parkway continues west to State Route 29 (SR 29) in Vallejo.

== Route description ==
The entirety of I-780 is defined in section 623 of the California Streets and Highways Code as Route 780, and that the highway is from "Route 680 at Benicia to Route 80 in Vallejo". This definition roughly corresponds with the Federal Highway Administration (FHWA)'s route logs of I-780.

The I-780 state-maintained freeway actually begins at Lemon Street and Curtola Parkway, quickly crossing underneath I-80 at a cloverleaf interchange. The freeway passes through parts of unincorporated Solano County, then heads southeast along the Benicia State Recreation Area (a marsh). It then bypasses downtown Benicia through the hills to the north. I-780 ends at I-680 at the north end of the Benicia–Martinez Bridge, with I-680 heading south through the East Bay to San Jose.

I-780 is part of the California Freeway and Expressway System and, as with every Interstate Highway, is part of the National Highway System, a network of highways that are considered essential to the country's economy, defense, and mobility by the Federal Highway Administration (FHWA).

== History ==
By 1914, a paved county road connected Vallejo and Benicia north of the Carquinez Strait, following the present Maine Street, Benicia Road, Columbus Parkway, and K Street. Although state highways were designated to Benicia in 1910 (Legislative Route (LRN) 7, now I-680) and Vallejo in 1931 (LRN 74, now SR 29), this connection was not added until 1935, when LRN 74 (an unsigned designation) was extended east from Vallejo to Benicia and north along former LRN 7 to Fairfield. (A short spur connecting Vallejo to the Carquinez Bridge was added to LRN 74 in 1937.) LRN 74 initially entered Benicia on K Street and left on East 5th Street, making several turns in between. Two realignments were built in the 1940s, reducing the number of turns to one, at the corner of L and East 2nd streets.

On September 15, 1955, the Bureau of Public Roads approved the Interstate Highway System spurs and connections in urban areas. Among these was a loop around the San Francisco Bay, soon numbered I-280 and I-680. The east half (I-680) incorporated a number of existing legislative routes, including LRN 69, LRN 108, LRN 107, LRN 75, and LRN 74, crossing the Carquinez Strait on the proposed Benicia–Martinez Bridge and ending at I-80 near downtown Vallejo. The first piece of this freeway north of the Carquinez Strait was at the I-80 cloverleaf interchange, built in the late 1950s when I-80 was upgraded through Vallejo. This was an extremely short roadway, beginning at Lemon Street, crossing under I-80 and Laurel Street and ending at Reis Avenue and Cedar Street. In about 1960, it was extended east to the old highway (Columbus Parkway) between the cities and was completed to the new bridge in about 1962, the year the bridge opened.

State Route 141
- Location: Vallejo
- Existed: 1964–1988

In the 1964 state highway renumbering, the legislative designation of the completed Vallejo–Benicia freeway was changed from LRN 74 to LRN 680, reflecting its Interstate designation. The short piece of nonfreeway in Vallejo, extending west from I-80 to SR 29, became State Route 141 (SR 141). This route followed Benicia Road and Maine Street, the same alignment the state highway had always taken; it initially connected with I-780 via Lemon Street but later followed Benicia Road from I-80 north of I-780. In 1975, a proposed (and never constructed) extension west and north to SR 37 east of the Napa River was added to LRN 141. The route was to be the Waterfront Freeway, scaled down to a boulevard in 1974.

The FHWA approved a relocation of I-680 onto the SR 21 freeway between Benicia and Fairfield in July 1973. To keep the route to Vallejo in the Interstate system, it was renumbered I-780; the corresponding legislative changes were made in 1976. As part of the project to construct a new northbound Benicia–Martinez Bridge, the I-680/I-780 interchange was rebuilt; the new span opened in August 2007. LRN 141 was deleted from the state highway system in 1988, soon after the city of Vallejo constructed Curtola Parkway over (replacing Maryland Street) just to the south, directly connecting I-780 with a surface road to SR 29.

== Exit list ==
Mileage was measured from east-to-west based on the alignment of LRN 680 as it existed at that time. Exit numbers were still assigned the conventional west-to-east ascension. The entire route is in Solano County.

Location	mi	km	Exit	Destinations	Notes
Vallejo	6.75	10.86	—	Curtola Parkway	Continuation beyond Lemon Street
Vallejo	6.75	10.86	—	Lemon Street	Western terminus; at-grade intersection
Vallejo	6.70	10.78	1A	I-80 west – San Francisco	I-80 exit 30A
Vallejo	6.70	10.78	1B	I-80 east – Sacramento	I-80 exit 30A
Vallejo	6.58	10.59	1C	Laurel Street	Eastbound signage
Vallejo	6.58	10.59	1C	Cedar Street	Westbound signage
Vallejo	5.51	8.87	1D	Glen Cove Road	
Benicia	4.28	6.89	3A	Columbus Parkway	Serves Benicia State Recreation Area
Benicia	3.51	5.65	3B	Military West	
Benicia	3.32	5.34	4	Southampton Road	
Benicia	1.52	2.45	5	East Second Street – Central Benicia	
Benicia	1.09	1.75	6	East Fifth Street	
Benicia	0.00	0.00	7A	I-680 north – Fairfield, Sacramento	Eastern terminus; I-680 exit 58A; tri-stack interchange
Benicia	0.00	0.00	7B	I-680 south – Martinez, San Jose	Eastern terminus; I-680 exit 58A; tri-stack interchange
1.000 mi = 1.609 km; 1.000 km = 0.621 mi
