= CA 242 =

Tumor marker

CA 242 is a tumor marker for sialylated Lewis carbohydrates associated with adenocarcinomas and e-selectin-mediated metastatic risk. It is commonly tested along with CEA, CA19-9, and CA242 for detecting pancreatic cancer. The specificity of CA 242 is higher than similar markers. Current research dictates that diagnostic efficiency is highest when various tumor markers are tested for at once.

CA 242 has been used clinically as a diagnostic biomarker for pancreatic, colorectal and other cancers. Since CA 242 is overexpressed in malignant tumors, it is within reason to assume that CA 242 could be a product of cancer cells. A study was conducted where CA 242 serum levels were acquired from 34, 680 patients with 27 clinically defined diseases. The data acquired shows that patients with pancreatic cancer, cervical cancer and lymphoma had the highest levels of the CA 242 serum, which was followed by esophageal, colon and ovarian cancer. CA 242 can be shown to detect other types of cancer as shown.

== Analysis of CA 242 and other tumor markers ==
The objective of this study was to compare different tumor markers and their diagnostic value. The tumor markers tested in this experiment were CA 19-9, CA 242 and CEA tumor markers. The data revealed that although each marker has its own level of specificity and corresponds to a cancer, all three markers together increase diagnostic value.
