= California State Route 242 =

Highway in California

State Route 242
- SR 242 highlighted in red

Route information
- Maintained by Caltrans
- Length: 3.398 mi (5.469 km)
- Existed: 1987–present

Major junctions
- South end: I-680 at the Pleasant Hill–Concord border
- North end: SR 4 in Concord

Location
- Country: United States
- State: California
- Counties: Contra Costa

Highway system
- State highways in California; Interstate; US; State; Scenic; History; Pre‑1964; Unconstructed; Deleted; Freeways
← SR 241	→ SR 243

State Route 242 (SR 242) is an approximately 3.4-mile (5.5 km) state highway in Contra Costa County, California that links Interstate 680 at the Pleasant Hill–Concord border to State Route 4 in Concord. Along with Interstate 580, State Route 24, Interstate 680 and State Route 4, it serves as the most direct route between the San Francisco Bay Area and the Sacramento–San Joaquin River Delta region.

In 2000, State Route 242 was widened to six through-traffic lanes for the entire route. Ramp metering is present at all onramps, and is used southbound in the morning and northbound in the evening. It was signed as part of State Route 24 until ca. 1987.

== Route description ==
Route 242 is defined in section 542 of the California Streets and Highways Code, and that the highway is "from Route 680 to Route 4 north of Concord".

The route begins as a freeway at Interstate 680 at the Pleasant Hill–Concord border. It then heads north into Concord, meeting Clayton Road, Concord Avenue, Grant Street, and Olivera Road before meeting its north end at State Route 4 just west of the former Concord Naval Weapons Station.

SR 242 is part of the California Freeway and Expressway System, and is part of the National Highway System, a network of highways that are considered essential to the country's economy, defense, and mobility by the Federal Highway Administration.

== Exit list ==
The entire route is in Contra Costa County.

Location	mi	km	Exit	Destinations	Notes
Pleasant Hill–Concord line	0.00	0.00	1A	I-680 south – Oakland, San Jose	No access to I-680 north; south end of SR 242; I-680 north exit 50
Concord	0.00	0.00	1B	Gregory Lane, Monument Boulevard	Southbound exit and northbound entrance
Concord	0.87	1.40	1	Clayton Road – Concord	Northbound exit and southbound entrance
Concord	1.47	2.37	1C	Concord Avenue	No northbound exit
Concord	2.15	3.46	2	Grant Street, Solano Way	Serves John Muir Health – Concord Medical Center
Concord	2.79	4.49	3A	Olivera Road	Northbound exit and southbound entrance
Concord	3.40	5.47	3B–C	SR 4 – Richmond, Stockton, Pittsburg; Port Chicago Highway	Northern end of SR 242; SR 4 exit 15A; signed as exits 3B (west, Richmond, Port Chicago Highway) and 3C (east, Stockton, Pittsburg)
1.000 mi = 1.609 km; 1.000 km = 0.621 mi: Incomplete access
