= Benicia State Recreation Area =

State recreation area in California

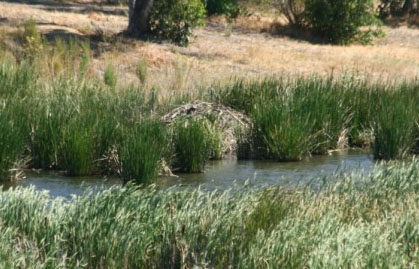
- Beaver lodge on Southampton Creek

- Location within California Location within the United States
- Location: Solano County, California, United States
- Nearest city: Benicia, California
- Coordinates: 38°4′25″N 122°11′35″W
- Area: 447 acres (181 ha)
- Established: 1957
- Governing body: California Department of Parks and Recreation

Benicia State Recreation Area is a state park unit of California, United States, protecting tidal wetland. It is located in the Solano County city of Benicia, 2 miles (3.2 km) west of downtown Benicia and borders Vallejo's Glen Cove neighborhood. The park covers 447 acres (181 ha) of marsh, grassy hillsides and rocky beaches along the narrowest portion of the Carquinez Strait. Southampton Creek and the tidal marsh front Southampton Bay, where the combined waters of the Sacramento and San Joaquin Rivers approach San Pablo Bay, the northern portion of San Francisco Bay.

== History ==
Don José de Cañizares — diarist on the 1769 overland Portola expedition and who sailed with Don Juan Manuel de Ayala on the San Carlos, the first ship to enter San Francisco Bay on August 5, 1775 — named the cove north and west of Benicia Puerto de las Asunta (Assumption Harbor in Spanish) because he discovered it on that feast day in 1775. The cove is noted as "J" on Cañizares' famous 1781 Map of San Francisco Bay. The present name, Southampton Bay, is for the Navy frigate Southampton, which Commodore Thomas ap Catesby Jones sailed, along with a small fleet, to the cove in 1849.

== Habitat and wildlife ==
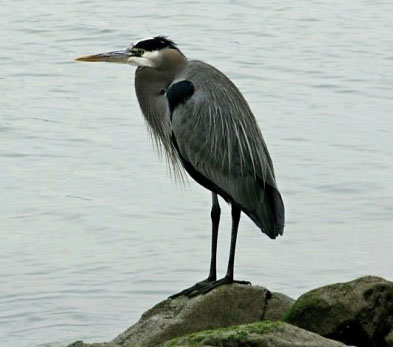
Great blue heron at Dillon Point, Benicia SRA 2009

The Southampton Bay Wetland Natural Preserve makes up 70% of the park. The Southampton mudflat formed eroded upriver silt and clay deposits exceeds 1,000 feet (300 m) thick. The principal habitats here are brackish marsh, saltwater marsh and freshwater marsh. This rare and endangered wetland ecosystem is covered with marsh plants such as salt grass (Distichlis spicata), pickleweed (Batis maritima), coyote bush (Baccharis pilularis) and soft bird's-beak (Cordylanthus mollis). Bird’s-beak is an endangered gray-green annual herb in the snapdragon family.

Park mammals include the federally endangered northern salt marsh harvest mice (Reithrodontomys raviventris halicoetes). Other mammals living in the park are coyote (Canis latrans), river otter (Lontra canadensis), muskrat (Ondatra zibethicus) and California golden beaver (Castor canadensis subauratus). The beaver probably migrated from the Sacramento-San Joaquin River Delta in 2007. Historically, before the California Fur Rush of the late eighteenth and early nineteenth centuries, the Delta probably held the largest concentration of beaver in North America. It was California's early fur trade, more than any other single factor, that opened up the West, and the San Francisco Bay Area in particular, to world trade. In 1840, explorer Captain Thomas Farnham wrote that "There is probably no spot of equal extent in the whole continent of America which contains so many of these muchsought animals."

Benicia SRA has been designated an Important Bird Area, providing habitat for endangered California clapper rails (Rallus longirostris obsoletus) and black rails (Laterallus jamaicensis). Other uncommon species include Virginia rails (Rallus limicola), Suisun song sparrows (Melospiza melodia maxillaris) and salt marsh common yellowthroat (Geothlypis trichas sinuosa). On their journey along the Pacific Flyway, many waterfowl winter in the park.

== Recreation ==
Cyclists, runners, walkers and roller skaters enjoy the park's 2.5 miles (4 km) of road and bike paths. The Hike and Bike Trail—two parallel, paved, accessible trails—begins at the Military West entrance and runs 0.75 miles to the main park entrance, joining Dillon Point Road for 1.5 miles. The trail system is part of the Bay Area Ridge Trail and San Francisco Bay Trail. Most popular is the 1.5-mile-long walk out to Dillon Point on the park road. Picnicking is available at the group picnic area, one mile into the park. The Forrest Deaner Native Plants Botanic Garden is located at the end of the picnic area, offering displays of and information about plants native to the Bay Area. From the top of Dillon Point, you can trace the route of the Carquinez Strait Scenic Loop Trail, a 50-mile route that will, when finished, ring the strait.

Dillon's Point offers prime shore fishing for white sturgeon (Acipenser transmontanus), starry flounder (Platichthys stellatus) and striped bass (Morone saxatilis).

== Gallery ==
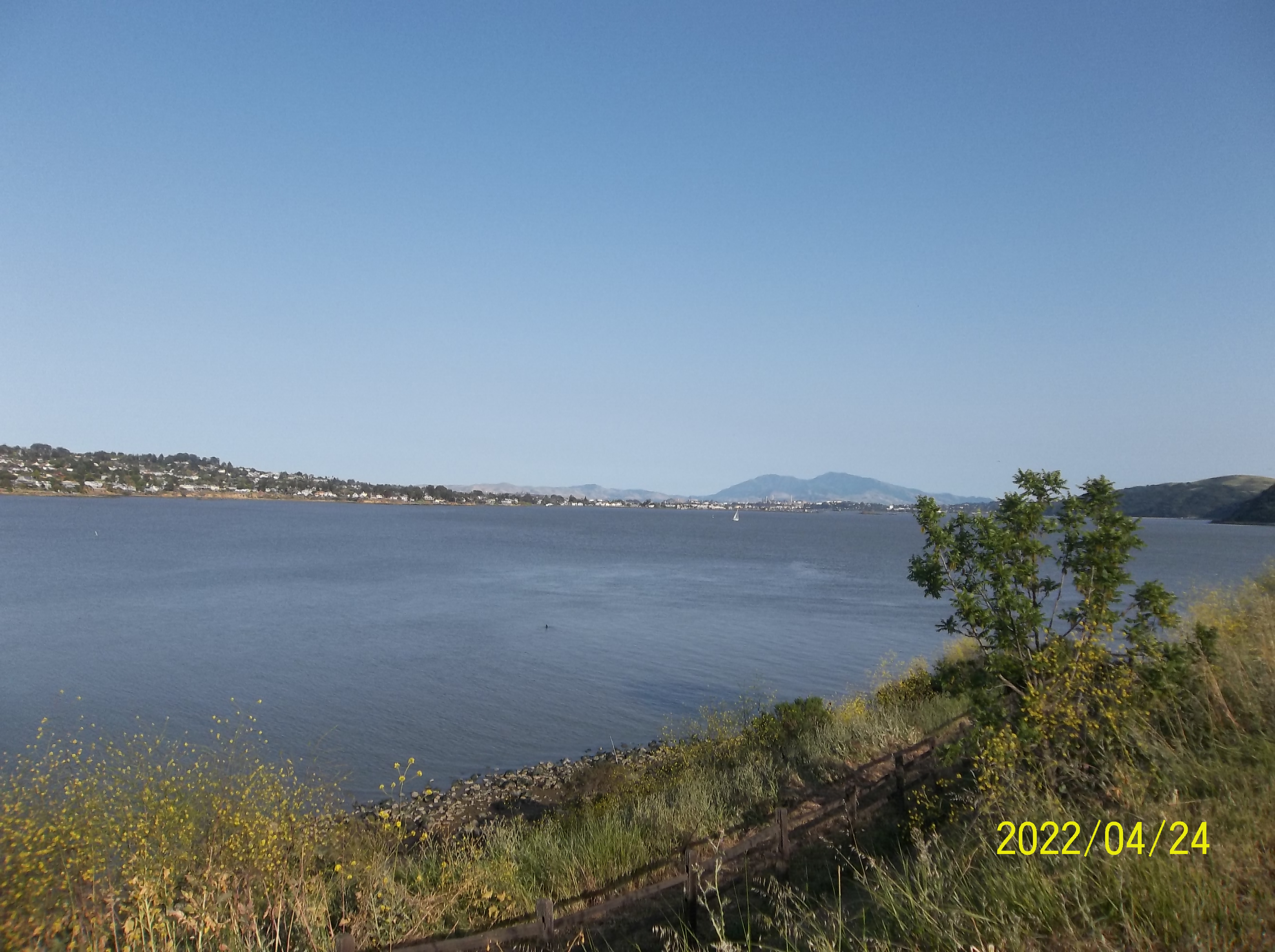
A view from the B. S. R. A. toward Mount Diablo

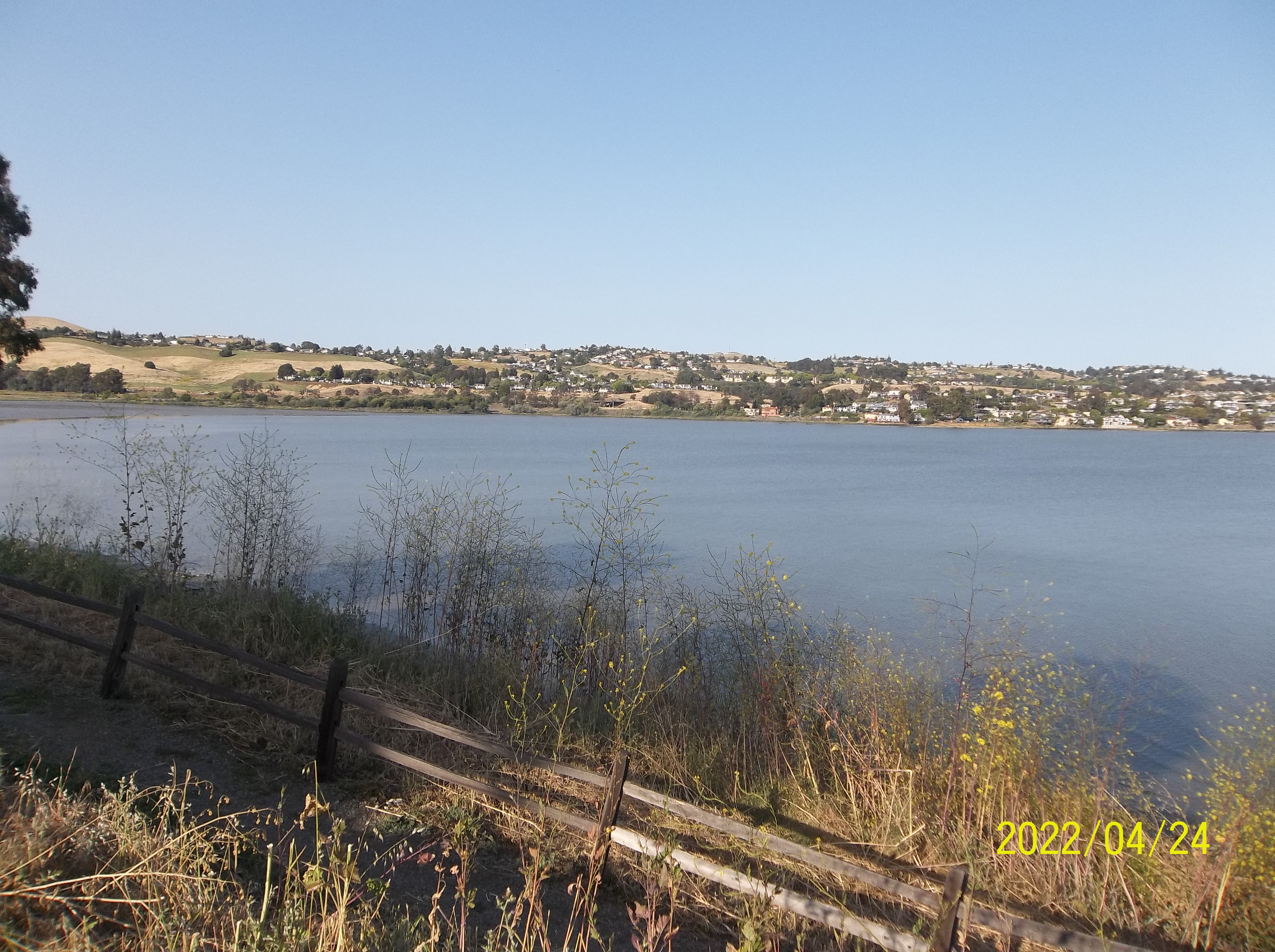
A view from the B. S. R. A.

== See also ==
- List of California state parks
- List of watercourses in the San Francisco Bay Area
