= Sunol Water Temple =

Ornamental structure in Sunol, California

Coordinates: 37°35.127′N 121°53.126′W

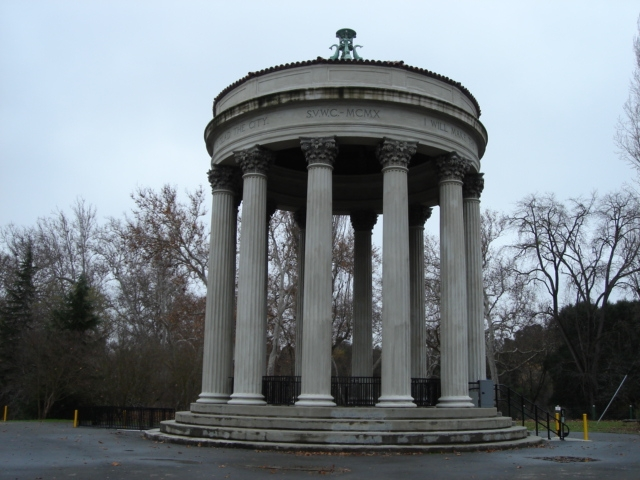
- Interactive map of the Sunol Water Temple area

General information
- Architectural style: High Classical
- Year built: 1910

Technical details
- Material: Concrete

Design and construction
- Architect: Willis Polk

The Sunol Water Temple is located at 505 Paloma Way in Sunol, California. Designed by Willis Polk, the 59-foot (18 m) high classical pavilion is made up of twelve concrete Corinthian columns and a concrete ring girder that supports the conical wood and tile roof. Inside the temple, water originally from the Pleasanton well fields and Arroyo de la Laguna flowed into a white tiled cistern before plunging into a deeper water channel carrying water from the filter galleries to the Niles Aqueduct in Niles Canyon and across San Francisco Bay near the Dumbarton Bridge. The ceiling of the temple has panels with paintings by Yun Gee and other artists depicting a Native American maiden carrying water vessels, and women in classical poses. The temple is open to the public Monday to Friday, 9 a.m. to 3 p.m.

== History ==
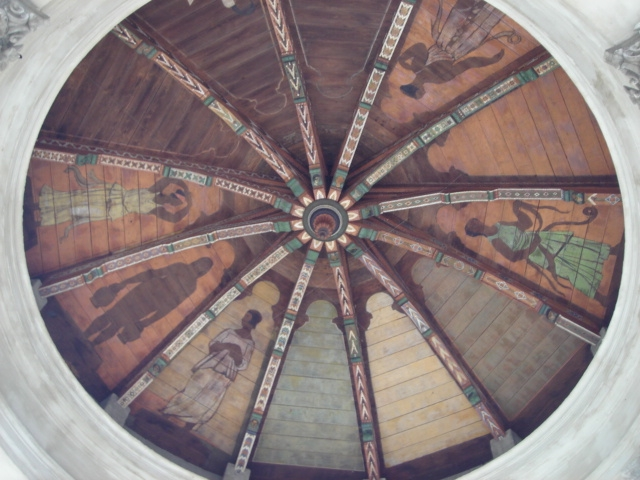
The restored ceiling of the temple. The empty sections were never completed.

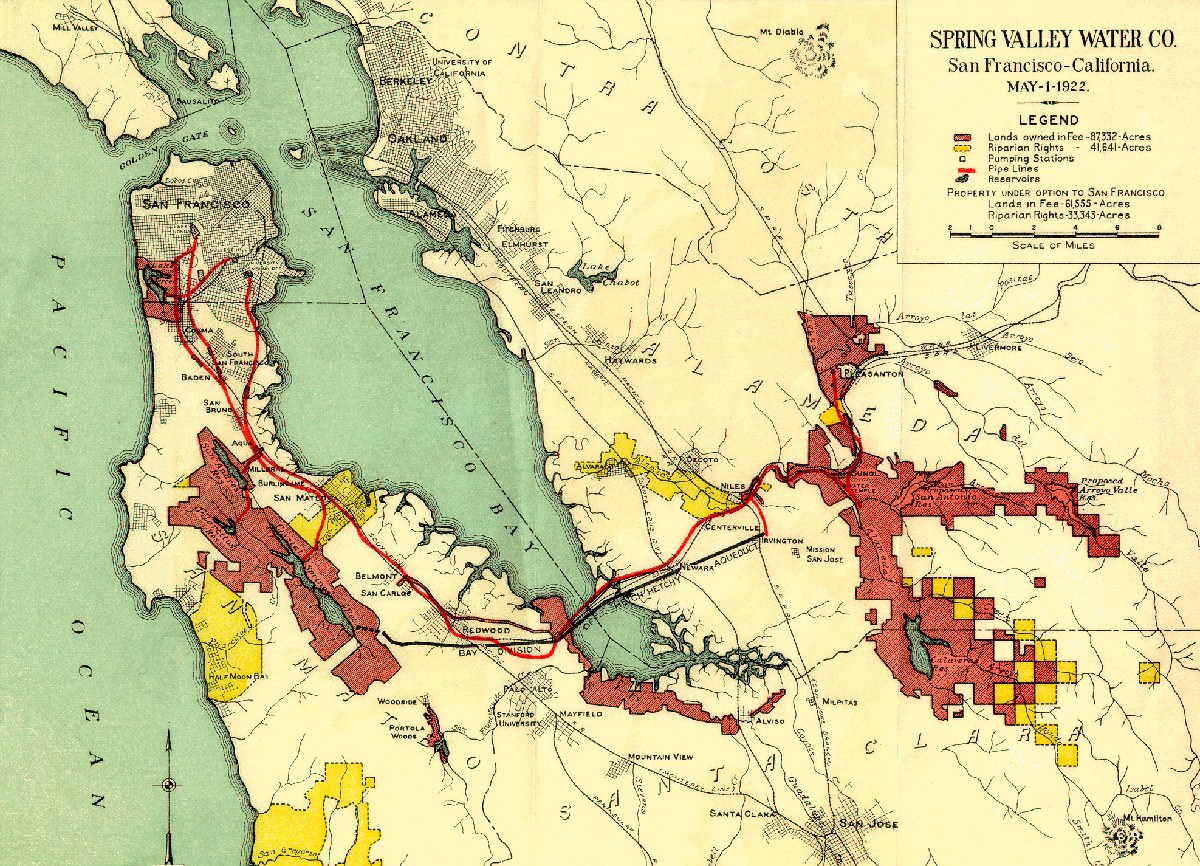
A 1922 map showing the property and pipelines of the SVWC, plus the Sunol Temple

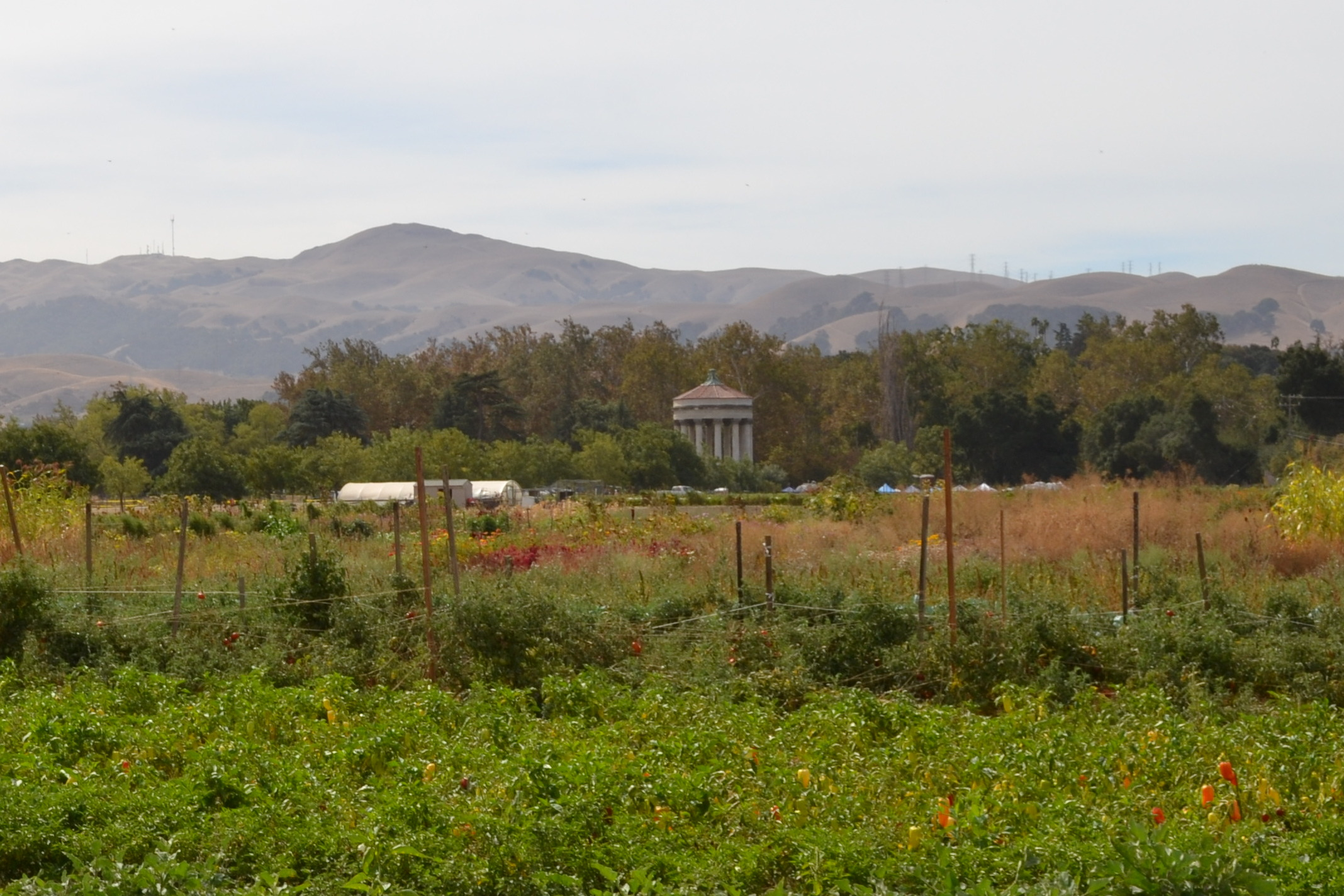
The temple and the surrounding area

Since the mid-19th century a private company, the Spring Valley Water Company (SVWC), owned much of the Alameda Creek Watershed and had held a monopoly on water service to San Francisco. In 1906, William Bowers Bourn II, a major stockholder in the SVWC, and owner of the giant Empire gold mine, hired Willis Polk to design a "water temple" atop the spot where three subterranean water sources converge (a pipe from the Arroyo de la Laguna, Alameda Creek, through the Sunol infiltration galleries, and a 30-inch (76 cm) pipeline from the artesian well field of Pleasanton). Some sources claim Bourn wanted to sell the water company to the City of San Francisco and saw the temple as a way to appeal to San Francisco voters, who would have to approve the purchase (municipal efforts to buy out the SVWC had been a source of constant controversy from as early as 1873, when the first attempt to purchase it was turned down by the voters because the price was too high). Other sources claim that as one born into wealth and classically educated, Bourn was partially motivated by a sense of civic responsibility.

Polk's design, modeled after the ancient Temple of Vesta in Tivoli, Italy, was constructed in 1910 (Tivoli is where many of the waters that fed Rome converged in the foothills of the Apennines). Prior to the construction of the Hetch Hetchy Aqueduct, half of San Francisco's water supply (6,000,000 US gallons (23,000,000 L; 5,000,000 imp gal) a day) passed through the Sunol temple. The SVWC, including the temple, was purchased by San Francisco in 1930 for $40 million.

For decades the Water Temple received many visitors and was a popular location for picnickers. By the 1980s the water temple had badly deteriorated, and was severely damaged in 1989's Loma Prieta earthquake, leading some community leaders to call for its demolition. The site was closed to the public because of safety concerns. A community effort led to the temple's restoration from 1997 to 2001, at a cost of $1.2 million, including seismic and accessibility upgrades. Following its restoration the temple opened again to the public. Today any water that flows through the temple is not part of the potable water supply.

Fields adjacent to the temple belong to the city of San Francisco which has authorized the digging of a gravel quarry on the site. Local residents concerned about the temple's future brought a lawsuit to attempt to block the quarry project, but eventually ran out of funds and dropped the suit.

In June 2006, a new facility named the Sunol Agricultural Park was opened on a site adjacent to the temple. The park provides space for small businesses and nonprofit groups to grow produce and was originally a project of a non-profit called Sustainable Agriculture Education (SAGE). The park serves a platform for service and educational programs related to sustainable agriculture and environmental conservation.

== Inscription ==
"I will make the wilderness a pool of water and the dry lands springs of water. [Isaiah 41:18] The streams whereof shall make glad the city. [Psalms 46:4] S.V.W.C. MCMX [Spring Valley Water Company 1910]"

== See also ==
- Pulgas Water Temple, a similar structure on the San Francisco Peninsula, opened in 1934 to commemorate the completion of the Hetch Hetchy Aqueduct
