= Claremont, Oakland/Berkeley, California =

Claremont
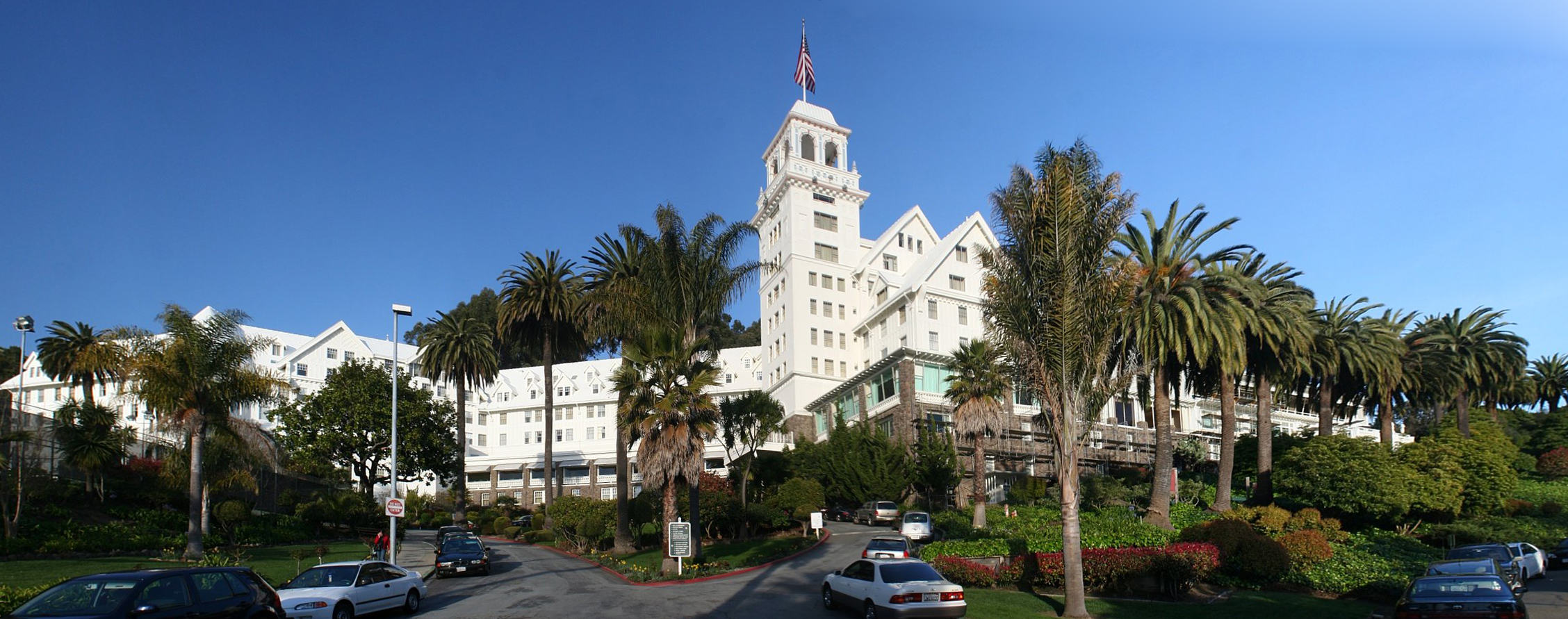
- The Claremont Resort at the heart of the Claremont neighborhood

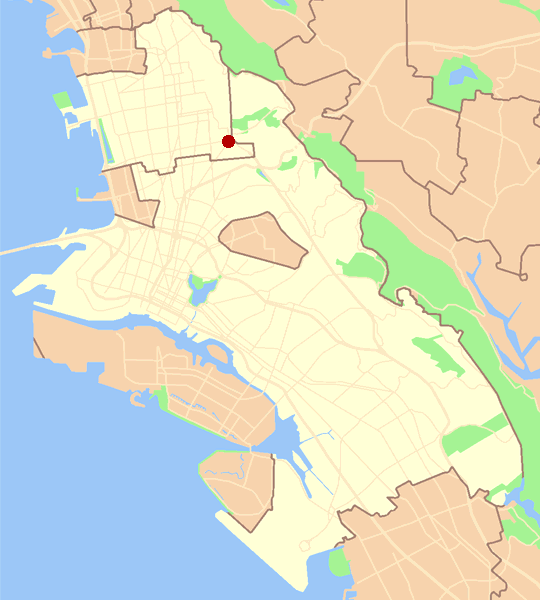
- Location of Claremont in the cities of Oakland and Berkeley
- Coordinates: 37.855833°N 122.249444°W
- Country: United States
- State: California
- County: Alameda
- Cities: Oakland and Berkeley

The Claremont district is a neighborhood straddling the city limits of Oakland and Berkeley in the East Bay section of the San Francisco Bay Area in California, United States. The main thoroughfares are Claremont and Ashby Avenues.

The name "Claremont" was adopted December 20, 1879, at a meeting convened by a real estate developer and local resident, Grant Taggert. Within a year or so of this, the name of the main thoroughfare was changed from Telegraph Road to Claremont Avenue. The Telegraph Road had been named for the first telegraph line into Oakland, strung by the Alta Telegraph Company in 1859. The line ran from Martinez across the hills and down what was then named "Harwood's Canyon" after an early claimant to grazing lands in the canyon above the Claremont neighborhood, retired sea captain and Oakland wharfinger William Harwood. With the advent of the telegraph line, it became "Telegraph Canyon", a name that persists for a side canyon near the summit of the hills. The creek which runs through the Claremont neighborhood was first known as the north fork of Temescal Creek. It later became Harwood Creek, and eventually, Claremont Creek. Many local residents still refer to the stream as Harwood Creek.

During the 19th century, a stage coach line ran up the canyon and over the summit into Contra Costa County via the Telegraph Road. This became an early auto route over the Berkeley Hills even after the first tunnel (the Inter County Tunnel) opened up in 1903 to the south of Claremont Canyon, at the top of Temescal Canyon above where the Caldecott Tunnel is today.

In 1905, Duncan McDuffie opened up the Claremont Park development, an upscale tract with racial covenants, which prevented property owners from selling or renting to non-whites.

In 1909, the portion of the district which now lies within the city of Oakland was annexed to the city. Until then, it had been an unincorporated area of Alameda County.

In the early 1900s real estate interests associated with the Key System built the Claremont Hotel at the mouth of Claremont Canyon. The Key System ran one of its commuter train lines directly to the hotel up Claremont Avenue until service ended in 1958. This train became the transbay "E" train upon completion of the San Francisco–Oakland Bay Bridge.

The principal west–east thoroughfare through the Claremont was at first Russell Street which led directly to the road up Claremont Canyon. With the opening of the first tunnel however, Ashby became the more direct approach to the Tunnel Road and was improved over the years to channel through traffic, especially during the 1930s when both the new Broadway (later renamed Caldecott) Tunnel and the Bay Bridge were constructed. Ashby and Tunnel Road were then designated State Route 24 and connected to the Eastshore Highway (now Freeway) to serve as an access route to the Bay Bridge and San Francisco. Upon completion of the Grove-Shafter Freeway in the 1960s, it was re-designated State Route 13 and connected to the new Warren Freeway.

The Claremont district was one of the areas affected by the 1991 Oakland firestorm. The flames came within a few blocks of the Claremont Hotel, destroying much of the area northeast of Tunnel Road. The area has since been rebuilt.

== See also ==
- Telegraph Avenue
