= Interstate 580 (California) =

Interstate highway in California

Interstate 580
- I-580 highlighted in red

Route information
- Auxiliary route of I-80
- Maintained by Caltrans
- Length: 75.550 mi (Note: I-580 is broken into pieces, and the length does not reflect the I-80 overlap that would be required to make the route continuous.) (121.586 km)
- Existed: July 1, 1964–present
- Tourist routes: William Elton "Brownie" Brown Freeway, and the MacArthur Freeway through Oakland
- NHS: Entire route
- Restrictions: No trucks over 4.5 short tons (4.1 t; 4.0 long tons) through Oakland

Major junctions
- West end: US 101 in San Rafael
- I-80 from Albany to Oakland; I-880 in Oakland; I-980 / SR 24 in Oakland; SR 13 in Oakland; I-238 / SR 238 in Castro Valley; I-680 on the Dublin–Pleasanton border; SR 84 in Livermore; I-205 near Tracy; SR 132 near Tracy
- East end: I-5 near Tracy

Location
- Country: United States
- State: California
- Counties: Marin, Contra Costa, Alameda, San Joaquin

Highway system
- Interstate Highway System; Main; Auxiliary; Suffixed; Business; Future; State highways in California; Interstate; US; State; Scenic; History; Pre‑1964; Unconstructed; Deleted; Freeways
← I-505	→ I-605

Interstate 580 (I-580) is an approximately 76-mile-long (122 km) east–west auxiliary Interstate Highway in Northern California. The heavily traveled spur route of I-80 runs from US Route 101 (US 101) in San Rafael in the San Francisco Bay Area to I-5 at a point outside the southern city limits of Tracy in the Central Valley. I-580 forms a concurrency with I-80 between Albany and Oakland, the latter of which is the location of the MacArthur Maze interchange immediately east of the San Francisco–Oakland Bay Bridge. I-580 provides a connection from the Bay Area to the southern San Joaquin Valley and Southern California via I-5, as I-5 bypasses the Bay Area to the east.

A portion of I-580 is called the MacArthur Freeway, after General Douglas MacArthur. Other portions are named the John T. Knox Freeway (after a former speaker pro tempore of the California State Assembly), the Eastshore Freeway (after its location on San Francisco Bay), the Arthur H. Breed Jr. Freeway (after a former California State assemblyperson and senator—the stretch itself lying between the cities of Castro Valley and Dublin), the William Elton "Brownie" Brown Freeway (after a Tracy resident instrumental in determining the route of I-5 through the San Joaquin Valley), the Sgt. Daniel Sakai Memorial Highway (after the Castro Valley resident and Oakland SWAT officer killed in the 2009 shootings of Oakland police officers), and the John P. Miller Memorial Highway (after the Lodi resident and California Highway Patrol officer killed while chasing down a DUI driver).

== Route description ==
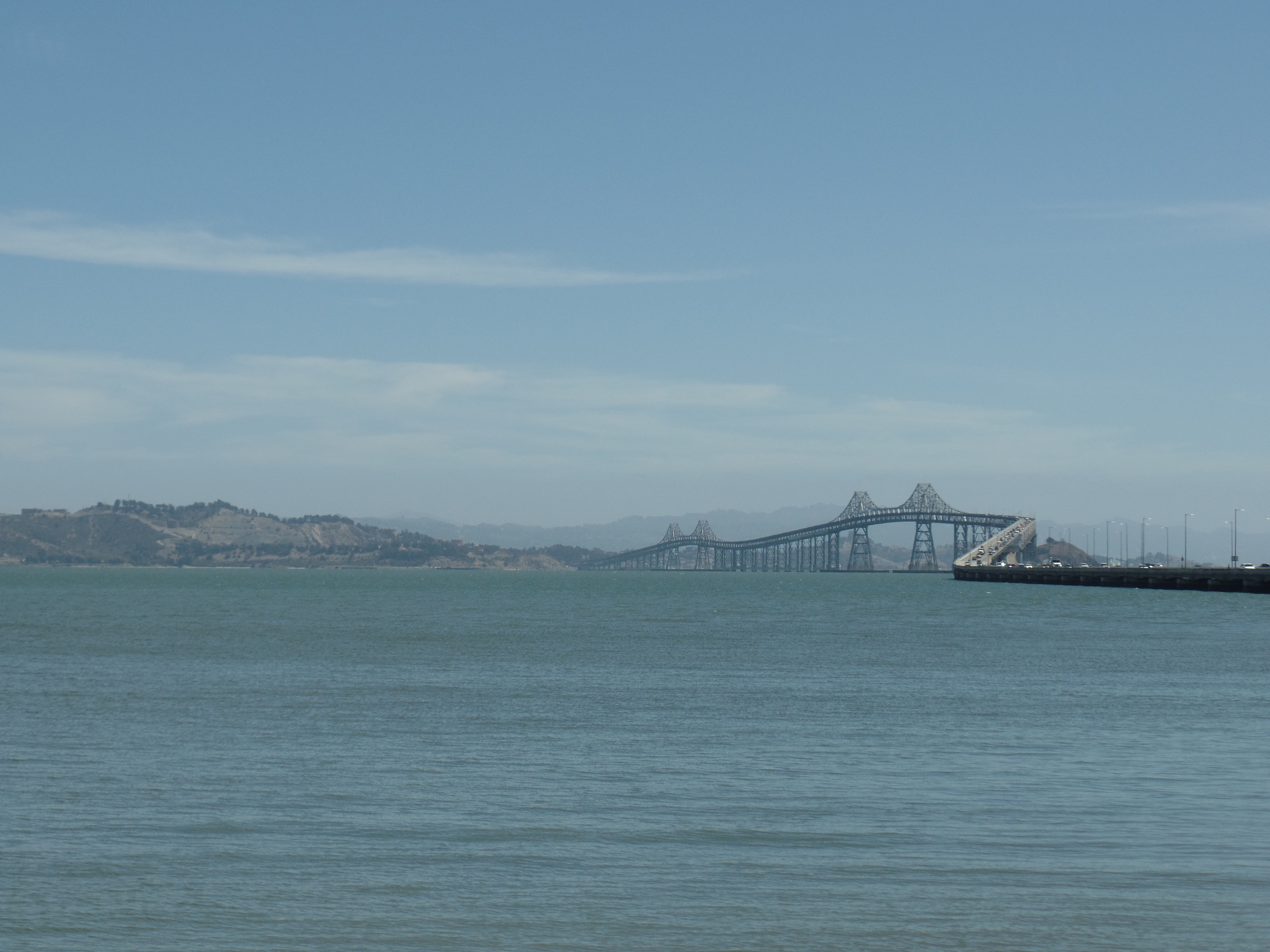
On the Richmond–San Rafael Bridge

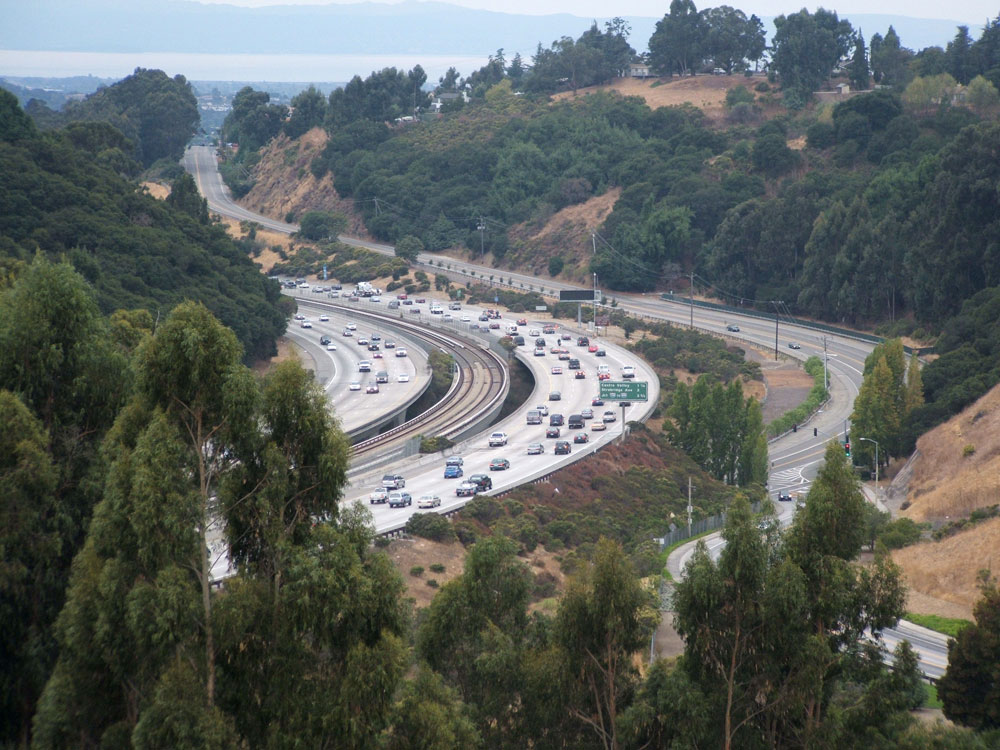
BART runs in the median through Castro Valley

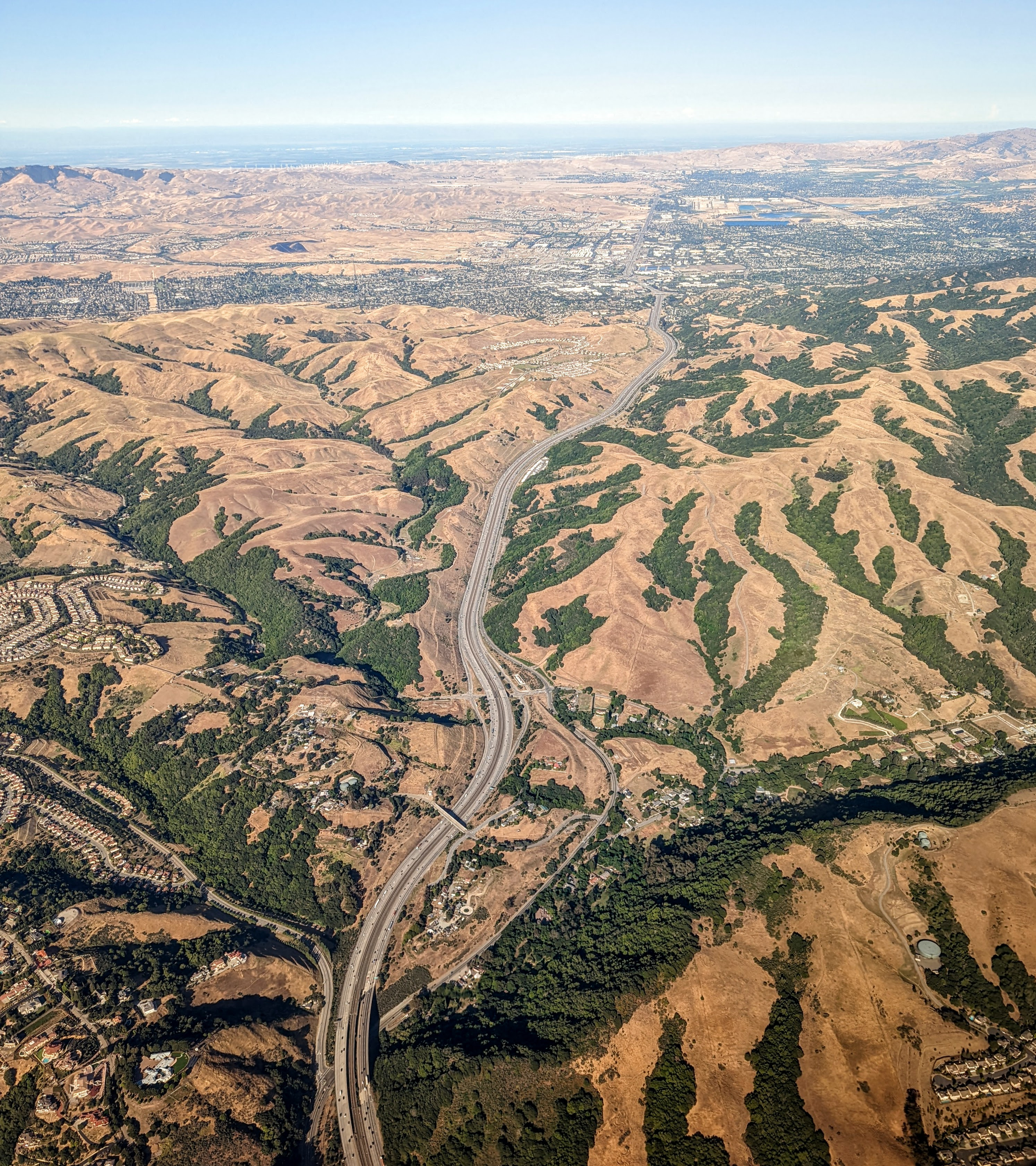
Aerial view looking east from above Castro Valley toward Dublin

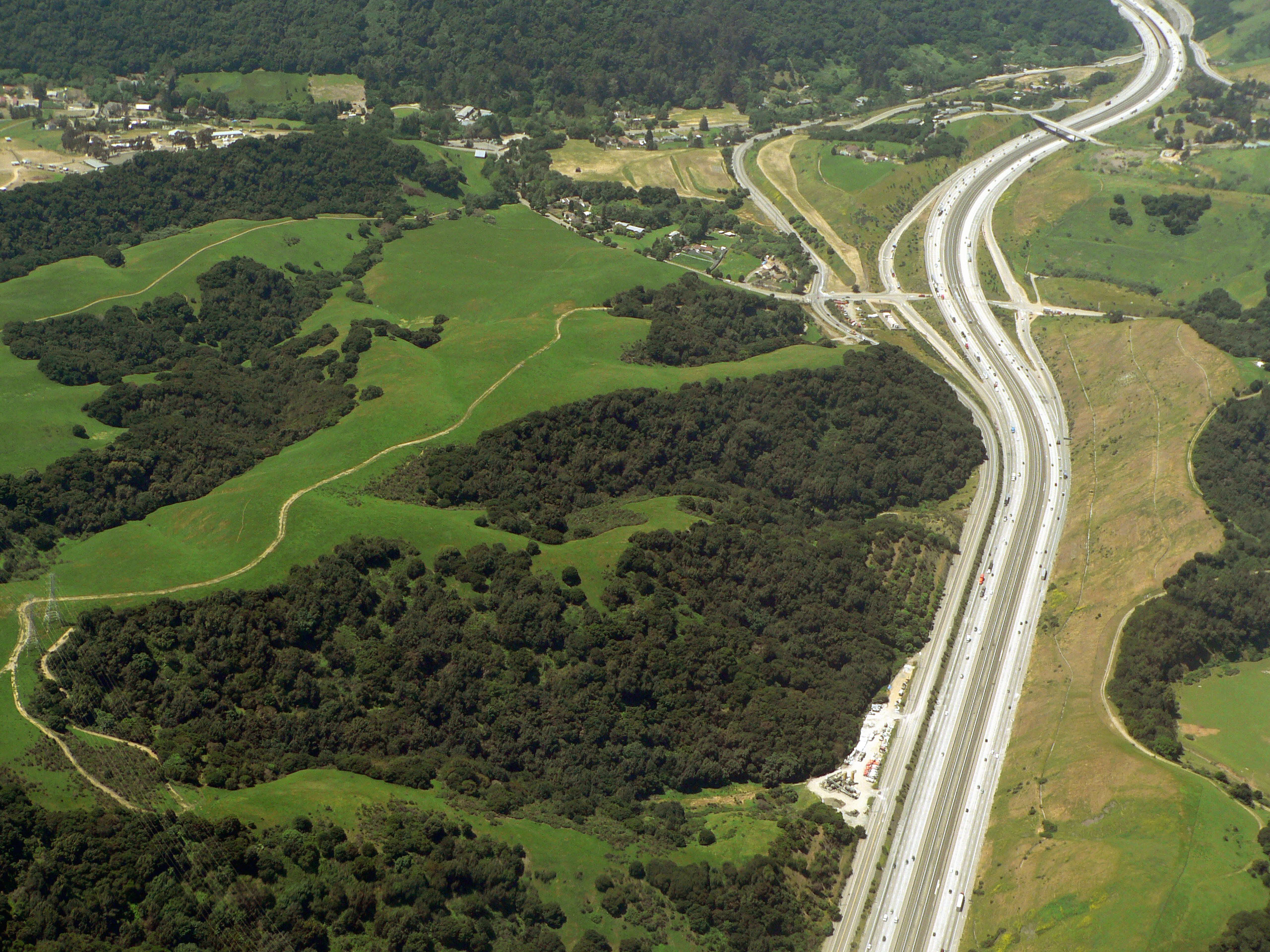
Looking west at Palomares Road at the west end of Dublin Canyon

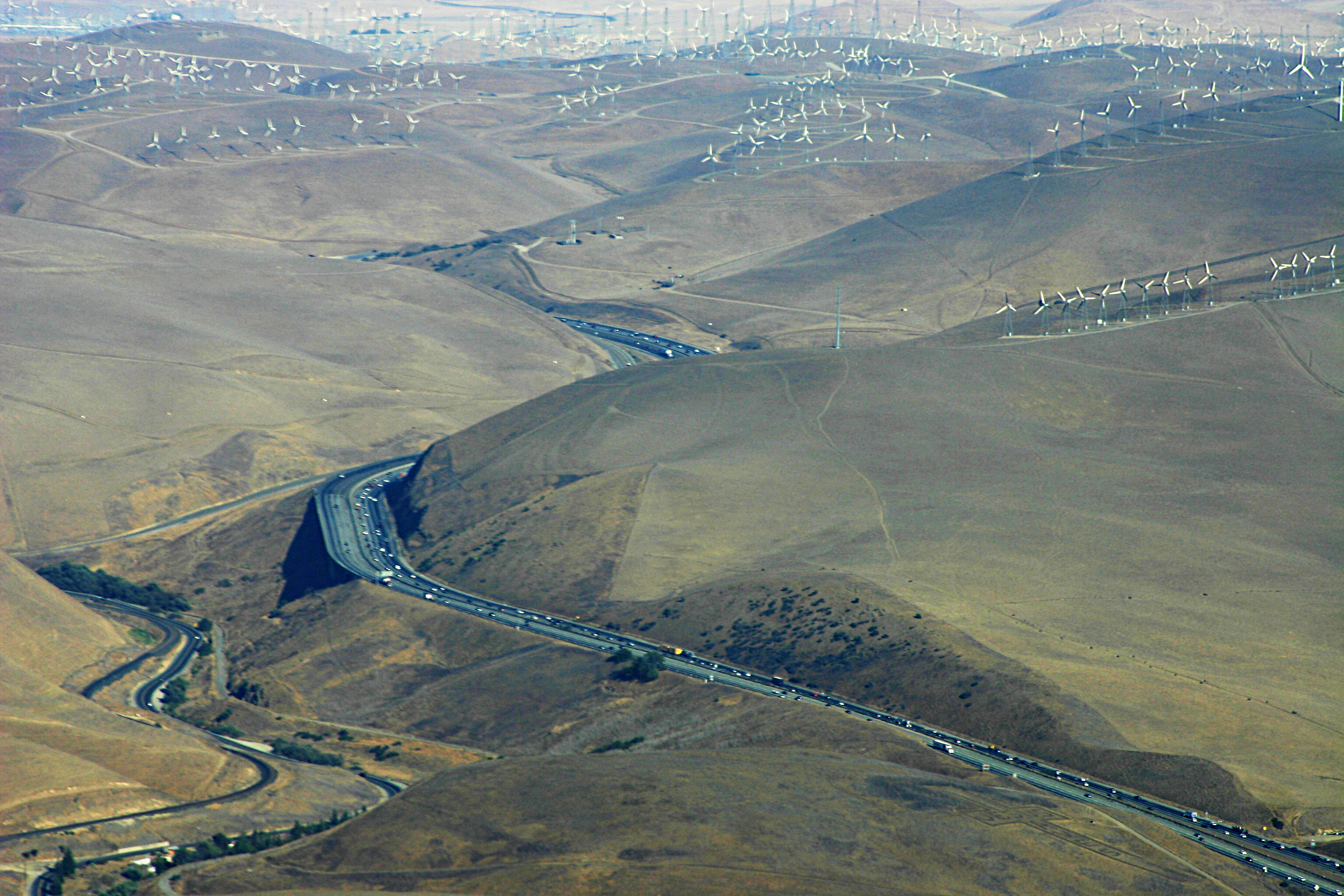
At the Altamont Pass wind farm

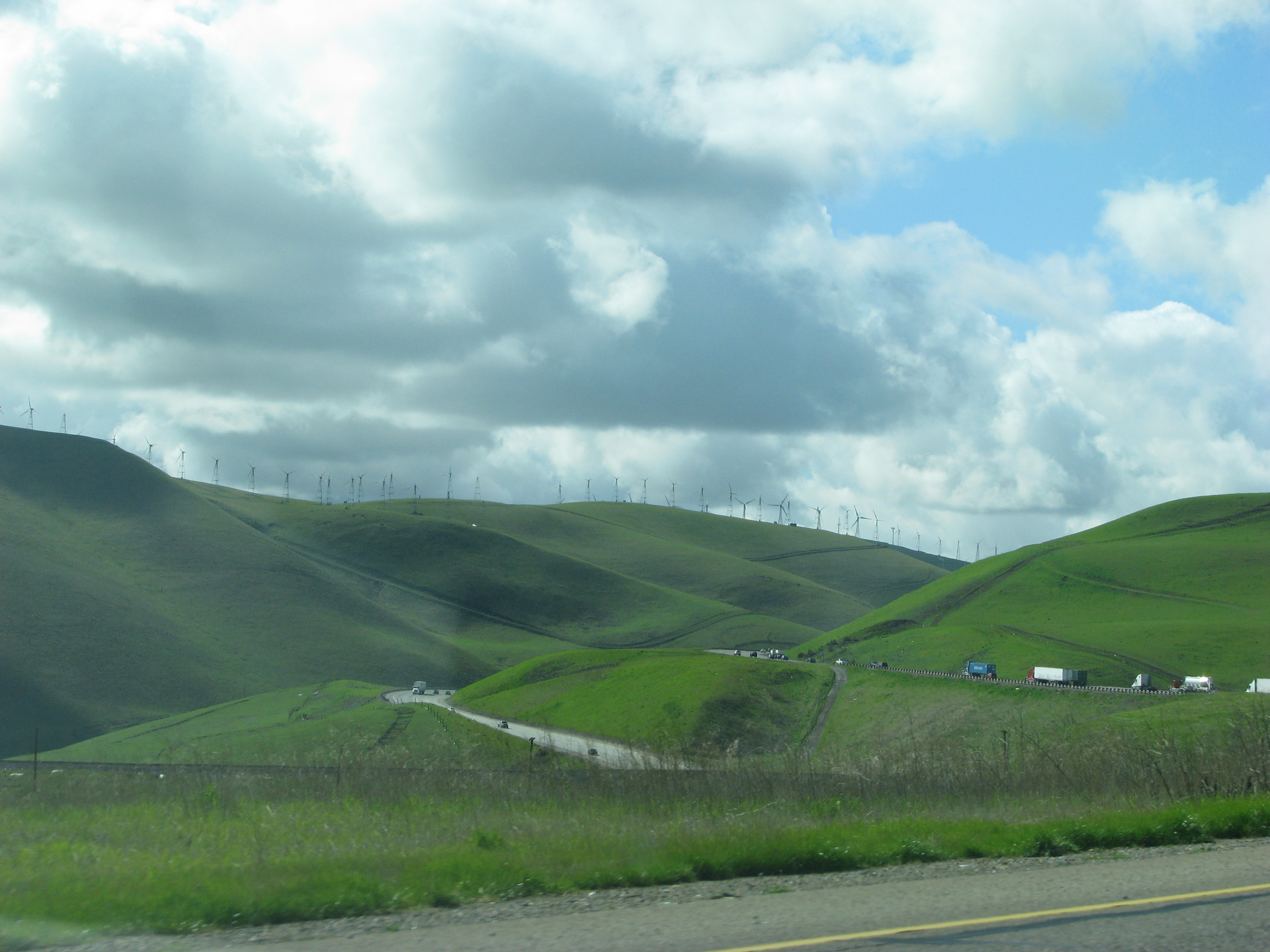
Westbound at Altamont Pass between Livermore and Tracy

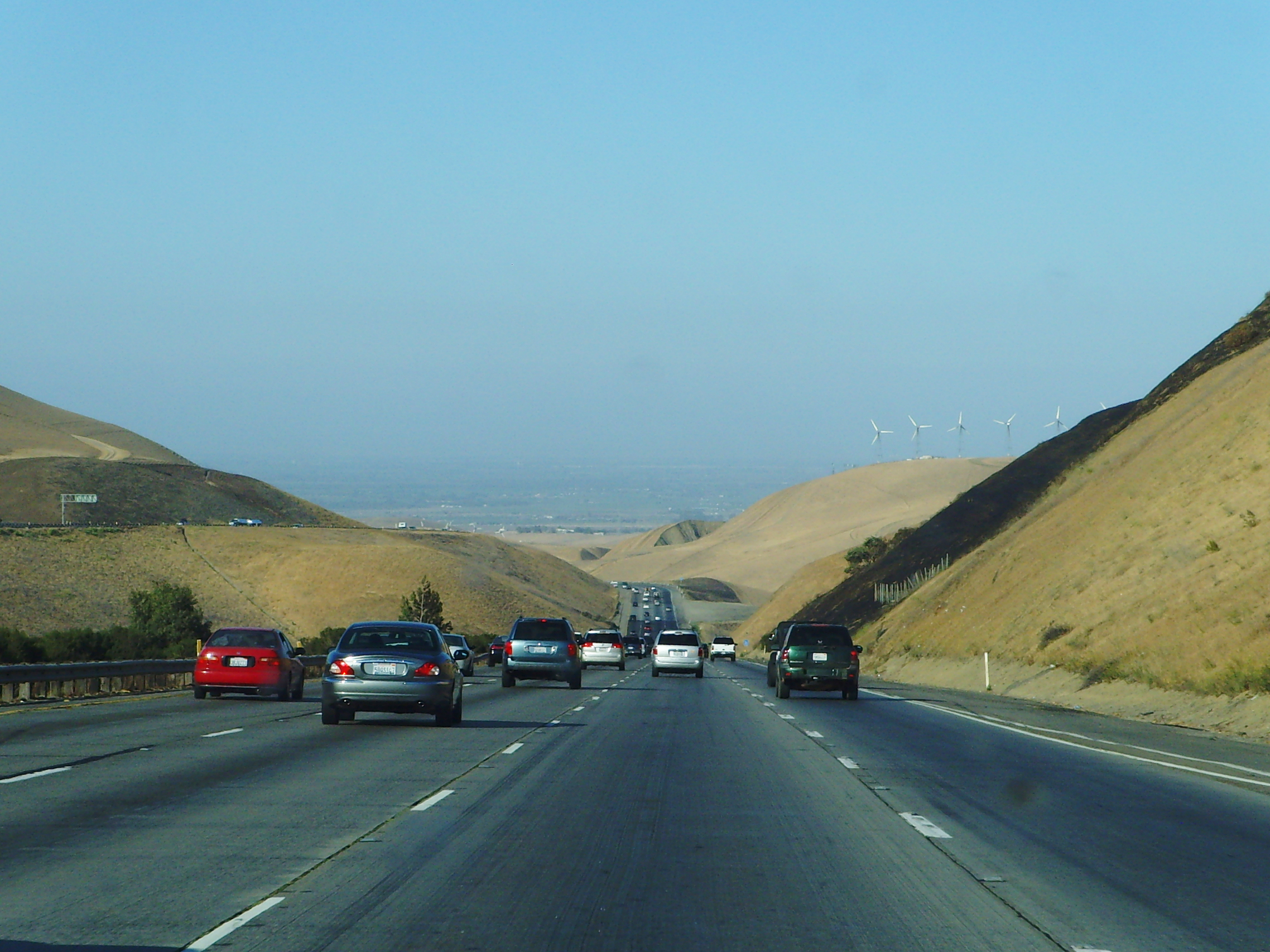
Emerging in the Central Valley near Tracy

The entirety of I-580 is defined in section 618 of the California Streets and Highways Code as Route 580:

Route 580 is from:
(a) Route 5 southwest of Vernalis to Route 80 in Oakland via the vicinity of Dublin and Hayward.
(b) Route 80 near Albany to Route 101 near San Rafael via the Richmond-San Rafael Bridge.

The definition omits Route 580's concurrency with Route 80 instead of duplicating that segment in the other route's definition in the code. The overlapped segment with I-80 is also not included in the Federal Highway Administration (FHWA)'s route logs of I-580, but is still signed as such by Caltrans.

The western terminus of I-580 is roughly 10 miles (16 km) north of San Francisco in the city of San Rafael (Marin County), at the junction with US 101. The interchange with US 101 is incomplete, only allowing continuous travel from southbound US 101 to eastbound I-580 (via exit 451B) and from westbound I-580 to northbound US 101. Traffic headed the other two directions is encouraged to use Sir Francis Drake Boulevard. Heading eastward through the light industrial portion of eastern San Rafael, I-580 provides access to San Quentin State Prison at the eastern tip of land before joining the Richmond–San Rafael Bridge to cross San Francisco Bay. I-580 enters the city of Richmond in Contra Costa County midspan, then continues through Richmond to join I-80 in Albany in Alameda County at the "Hoffman Split".

After joining I-80, I-580 runs directly south for several miles along the eastern shore of San Francisco Bay in the segment known as the Eastshore Freeway, then enters the MacArthur Maze. The segment between the Hoffman Split and the MacArthur Maze is a wrong-way concurrency, meaning I-580 east is signed as I-80 west, and vice versa. From the MacArthur Maze, I-580 is known as the MacArthur Freeway, which runs through Oakland and San Leandro to Castro Valley. About halfway to Castro Valley from the Maze, is an interchange with the Warren Freeway (State Route 13). Between this interchange and Castro Valley, I-580 runs near or along the trace of the Hayward Fault, a major branch of the San Andreas Fault.

In Castro Valley, I-580 turns eastward toward Dublin Canyon before descending into Dublin and Pleasanton. After passing through Livermore, the freeway enters the Altamont Pass. The road emerges in the Central Valley west of Tracy, where, after I-205 splits near Altamont Raceway Park, it turns southeastward into San Joaquin County and terminates by merging with I-5 south of Tracy just shy of the Stanislaus County line.

I-580 through Altamont Pass is a major crossing of the Diablo Range, linking the Central Valley to the Bay Area, and also a major route to Southern California. I-580 is the only freeway that crosses the Diablo Range, making it the safest route through the mountains. Prior to the construction of this route, traffic was detoured to Pacheco (SR 152) and Polonio (SR 46) passes.

I-580 provides Interstate Highway access between San Francisco and Los Angeles since I-5 runs east of the Bay Area. However, the primary control city listed on freeway signs along eastbound I-580 between I-80 and I-205 is instead Stockton, a vestige of when this segment used to be part of US 50.

I-580 is part of the California Freeway and Expressway System and is part of the National Highway System, a network of highways that are considered essential to the country's economy, defense, and mobility by the Federal Highway Administration (FHWA). The route is eligible for the State Scenic Highway System and is officially designated as a scenic highway by the California Department of Transportation (Caltrans) from the San Leandro city limits to SR 24 and from I-5 to I-205, meaning that these are substantial sections of highway passing through a "memorable landscape" with no "visual intrusions", where the potential designation has gained popular favor with the community.

== Truck ban through Oakland ==
Trucks over 4.5 short tons (4.1 t; 4.0 long tons) are prohibited through Oakland between Grand Avenue and the San Leandro border. Specifically, eastbound trucks cannot travel beyond Grand Avenue/Lakeshore Avenue (exit 21B), and those going westbound must get off at MacArthur Boulevard/Foothill Boulevard (exit 30). They are instead instructed to take I-238 in Castro Valley and then I-880 through Oakland as an alternative route. The California Highway Patrol may however temporarily lift the ban for short periods to reduce traffic congestion when major accidents occur on I-880 or I-238.

The truck prohibition has been in effect since before the freeway was built in 1963 as part of US 50. Both the FHWA and Caltrans imposed the restriction, partly because the city of Oakland already had a truck ban through the area prior to the freeway's construction. Since then, the restriction was grandfathered in when the freeway was both renumbered and added to the Interstate Highway System.

As a result, it is the only segment of Interstate Highway in California that is not part of the National Truck Network (several other California state highways have similar truck bans such as SR 2 and SR 85, but not any other Interstates). With trucks normally rerouted onto I-880 instead of I-580 through Oakland, the former generally gets more traffic than the latter. For decades, the trucking industry lobbied to have the ban removed but was unsuccessful due to local opposition. In 2000, the California State Legislature passed Assembly Bill 500, adding the I-580 truck restriction into the California Vehicle Code.

A collaborative study by the Environmental Defense Fund, Google, and the University of Texas at Austin used Google Street View cars equipped with air quality monitors to measure pollution data through Oakland. It found that along I-880, concentrations of black carbon were 80 percent higher, concentrations of nitrogen dioxide were 60 percent higher, and concentrations of nitric oxide were at least double than those along I-580. This has led community leaders to revisit the truck ban, particularly because I-880 runs along minority communities while I-580 runs through middle and upper middle class neighborhoods. Once a proponent of the ban when he served on the Oakland City Council in the 1990s, Alameda County Supervisor Nate Miley held a December 2021 virtual town hall on the issue, and asked both Caltrans and the Bay Area Air Quality Management District to conduct studies on the ban. He did however concede that the California State Legislature would have to eventually repeal the aforementioned rule in the California Vehicle Code for any change to occur.

Caltrans then began to conduct its own study in 2025, including the impact on safety, pollution, and traffic, which is expected to be concluded in 2026. Supporters of lifting the ban continue to argue that it overburdens the minority communities along I-880; supporters of keeping the ban note that there are more schools and community sites along I-580, and argue that lifting the ban would just spread the pollution around the city and the Bay Area.

== HOV lanes ==
Peak-hour high-occupancy vehicle (HOV) lanes exist on the westbound approach to the Richmond–San Rafael Bridge, and on both directions of the I-580/I-80 Eastshore Freeway concurrency that extend to the westbound San Francisco–Oakland Bay Bridge approach on I-80.

In April 2026, construction began to convert the westbound far-left lane on I-580 into a HOV lane from east of Piedmont Avenue in Oakland to the existing peak-hour HOV lane at the westbound Bay Bridge approach. Construction is expected to be completed by January 2027.

== Tolls ==
I-580 features High-occupancy toll (HOT) lanes along I-580 between Pleasanton and Livermore, which opened in February 2016. The eastbound express lanes stretch 12 miles (19 km) between Hacienda Drive and North Greenville Road. The westbound express lanes extend an additional two miles (3.2 km) west to San Ramon Road/Foothill Road.

As of January 2026, the HOT lanes' hours of operation is weekdays between 5:00 am and 8:00 pm; they are otherwise free and open to all vehicles at other times. Solo drivers are tolled using a congestion pricing system based on the real-time levels of traffic. Carpools and motorcycles are not charged. All tolls are collected using an open road tolling system, and therefore there are no toll booths to receive cash. Each vehicle using the HOT lanes is required to carry a FasTrak Flex transponder with its switch set to indicate the number of the vehicle's occupants (1, 2, or 3+). Solo drivers may also use the FasTrak standard tag without the switch. Drivers without any FasTrak tag will be assessed a toll violation regardless of whether they qualified for free.

Tolls are also collected for westbound traffic on the Richmond–San Rafael Bridge headed to San Rafael. All-electronic tolling is used on the bridge, and they can be paid by either a FasTrak transponder or license plate tolling.

== History ==
=== I-5W and the San Francisco Bay Area ===
Interstate 5W
- Location: Tracy–Dunnigan
- Existed: 1957–1970

Interstate 5W (I-5W) was originally conceived as part of a loop Interstate with a directional suffix and was what is now I-580 from I-5 to Oakland. However, I-5W and most of the other Interstates around the country with directional suffixes were eventually renumbered or eliminated, except for I-35E and I-35W in Texas and Minnesota, and more recently in Texas, the designations of I-69W, I-69C, and I-69E, along with proposed suffixed segments for future extensions of I-14 and I-27. The former route of I-5W now corresponds to I-580 from I-5 to Oakland, I-80 from Oakland to Vacaville, and I-505 from Vacaville to I-5 near Dunnigan.

=== I-5 to Castro Valley ===
For the most part, the I-580 freeway in this segment was constructed over or alongside the right-of-way of US 50, previously part of the old Lincoln Highway, during the course of the late 1960s and early 1970s. The segment which begins at the split with I-205 was constructed during the same period of time over a new right-of-way, running through some low hills on the west side of the San Joaquin Valley near the city of Patterson to a junction with I-5.

In the 1990s, the freeway segment from Castro Valley through Pleasanton was enlarged and otherwise reengineered in conjunction with the construction of the Blue Line of the Bay Area Rapid Transit (BART). The BART tracks were placed in a new median between the westbound and eastbound lanes of I-580 as was the new Dublin/Pleasanton station. The interchange with I-238 and the Hayward exit ramps was also reengineered at this time.

Significant expansion to the segment between I-680 and I-205 began in 2006. Among the projects along this segment were the high-occupancy vehicle lanes in each direction, a westbound auxiliary lane between Fallon and Tassajara roads, a new interchange at Isabel Avenue in Livermore, the reconstruction of several interchanges, the construction of additional truck climbing lanes for the eastward ascent to the Altamont Pass, and plans to preserve the right-of-way to accommodate a future BART extension in the median of the freeway. In 2017, citing lack of interest from the Bay Area Rapid Transit District in bringing BART service east to Livermore, the Livermore City Council proposed a newly established local entity to undertake planning and construction of the extension, which was also recommended by the California State Assembly Transportation Committee. Assembly Bill 758 was signed by then-Governor of California Jerry Brown on October 13, 2017, formally establishing the Tri-Valley–San Joaquin Valley Regional Rail Authority to construct and maintain the alternative Valley Link commuter rail.

=== MacArthur Freeway: Castro Valley to Oakland ===
The I-580 freeway in this segment was constructed starting in February 1960, adjacent to the city streets which were part of US 50 between Castro Valley and the large interchange along the eastern approach to the San Francisco–Oakland Bay Bridge in Oakland now called the MacArthur Maze. The freeway was named in honor of World War II General Douglas MacArthur. Prior to the construction of this freeway, the various city streets of Oakland that were designated for US 50 (principally 38th Street, Hopkins Street, Moss Avenue, Excelsior Avenue, and part of Foothill Boulevard) had been renamed for the General as "MacArthur Boulevard" which, for the most part, still parallels the MacArthur Freeway. The renaming occurred on March 26, 1942, by a resolution of the Oakland City Council.

The freeway was opened to traffic in eight segments until its completion in May 1966 (last segment, connecting with SR 238 (now I-238), in Castro Valley, opened May 20, 1966). It required several buildings and structures to be demolished along its route, including 160 about homes in Oakland's Trestle Glen.

=== Oakland to San Rafael ===
The segment of I-580 running from the MacArthur Maze to San Rafael is the most recent to be signed as I-580, beginning in 1984. Before 1984, this segment was part of SR 17.

From the Maze to the interchange locally known as the "Hoffman Split" in Albany, just north of the Gilman Street interchange (Hoffman Boulevard was the predecessor of I-580 in this section), I-580 follows the Eastshore Freeway, a wrong-way concurrency with I-80 for its entirety: northward on the Eastshore is signed I-80 east and I-580 west; headed southward, one finds signs indicating I-80 west and I-580 east.

At the Hoffman Split, I-580 leaves the Eastshore Freeway in a northwesterly direction through the cities of Albany and Richmond. It then crosses San Francisco Bay over the Richmond–San Rafael Bridge. The freeway in this section, officially named the John T. Knox Freeway, was constructed from 1987 to 1991. It replaced a number of city streets which comprised the earlier highway leading to the San Rafael Bridge, principally, Hoffman and Cutting boulevards.

After crossing the bridge, I-580 runs west to San Rafael, ending at an interchange with US 101. This freeway segment supplanted Francisco Boulevard East constructed as part of SR 17.

=== Interstate 180 ===
Interstate 180
- Location: San Rafael, California
- Existed: 1978–1983

Interstate 180 (I-180) was a temporary designation used in 1978 for the Richmond–San Rafael Bridge, now part of I-580. At the time, the bridge had been identified as part of SR 17 but was marked for inclusion in the Interstate Highway System.

Briefly the bridge used the number 180, despite the Fresno-area SR 180's use of the number. The California Streets and Highways Code has a policy against using one route number for multiple noncontiguous highways. Unless the existing SR 180 is renumbered, which is unlikely due to its familiarity as the road to Kings Canyon National Park, there will not be an I-180 in California.

== Exit list ==
County	Location	mi	km	Exit	Destinations	Notes
Marin; MRN 4.78–0.00	San Rafael	0.00	0.00	1A	US 101 north – San Rafael, Santa Rosa	Access to US 101 south is via exit 1B or 2A; west end of I-580; US 101 south exit 451B
Marin; MRN 4.78–0.00	San Rafael	0.00	0.00	1B	Francisco Boulevard to US 101 south – San Francisco	Signed as exit 1 eastbound
Marin; MRN 4.78–0.00	San Rafael	1.49	2.40	2A	Sir Francis Drake Boulevard to US 101 south	Westbound exit and eastbound entrance
Marin; MRN 4.78–0.00	San Rafael	2.15	3.46	2B	Francisco Boulevard – San Quentin	Signed as exit 2 eastbound
San Francisco Bay		4.78	7.69	Richmond–San Rafael Bridge (westbound toll only)		
Contra Costa; CC 7.79–0.00	Richmond	6.56	10.56	7A	Stenmark Drive – Point Molate	No eastbound exit; last free exit for westbound traffic
Contra Costa; CC 7.79–0.00	Richmond	7.46	12.01	7B	Richmond Parkway to I-80 east – Port Richmond, Sacramento	Signed as exit 7 eastbound
Contra Costa; CC 7.79–0.00	Richmond	7.93	12.76	8	Canal Boulevard, Garrard Boulevard	
Contra Costa; CC 7.79–0.00	Richmond	8.97	14.44	9	Cutting Boulevard, Harbour Way	Signed as exits 9A (Cutting Boulevard, Harbour Way south) and 9B (Harbour Way north) westbound
Contra Costa; CC 7.79–0.00	Richmond	9.68	15.58	10A	Marina Bay Parkway, South 23rd Street	
Contra Costa; CC 7.79–0.00	Richmond	10.48	16.87	10B	Regatta Boulevard	
Contra Costa; CC 7.79–0.00	Richmond	11.31	18.20	11	Bayview Avenue	
Contra Costa; CC 7.79–0.00	Richmond	12.28	19.76	12	Central Avenue	
Alameda; ALA 48.04–0.00	Albany	13.01	20.94	13	Buchanan Street	Westbound signage
Alameda; ALA 48.04–0.00	Albany	13.31	21.42	—	I-80 east (Eastshore Freeway) – Vallejo, Sacramento	West end of I-80 overlap; Hoffman Split interchange; westbound exit and eastbound entrance; eastbound access is via exit 7; I-580 west follows I-80 east exit 13B
Alameda; ALA 48.04–0.00	Albany	13.31	21.42	13A (Note: Exit numbers follow I-80 rather than I-580.)	Buchanan Street – Albany	Westbound I-580 / Eastbound I-80 signage
Alameda; ALA 48.04–0.00	Berkeley	14.24	22.92	12	Gilman Street	
Alameda; ALA 48.04–0.00	Berkeley	15.07	24.25	11	University Avenue – Berkeley	
Alameda; ALA 48.04–0.00	Berkeley	16.37	26.34	10	SR 13 south (Ashby Avenue) / Shellmound Street	Northern terminus of SR 13; Shellmound Street accessible only from westbound I-580 / eastbound I-80
Alameda; ALA 48.04–0.00	Emeryville	16.94	27.26	9	Powell Street – Emeryville	No exit from I-880 north
Alameda; ALA 48.04–0.00	Oakland	18.09	29.11	♦	San Francisco (I-80 west)	HOV access only via I-80 west; eastbound exit and westbound entrance
Alameda; ALA 48.04–0.00	Oakland	18.09	29.11	—	I-80 Toll west (Bay Bridge) – San Francisco	Eastbound signage; east end of I-80 overlap; west end of MacArthur Maze; I-580 east follows I-80 exit 8B
Alameda; ALA 48.04–0.00	Oakland	18.09	29.11	—	I-880 south (Nimitz Freeway) / West Grand Avenue – Alameda, San Jose	Eastbound exit and westbound entrance; eastbound exit is part of I-80 west exit 8B; northern terminus of I-880; access to Oakland International Airport; former SR 17 south
Alameda; ALA 48.04–0.00	Oakland	18.09	29.11	19A	I-80 Toll west (Bay Bridge) – San Francisco	Westbound left exit and eastbound entrance; east end of MacArthur Maze
Alameda; ALA 48.04–0.00	Oakland	19.03	30.63	19A	MacArthur Boulevard, San Pablo Avenue (SR 123)	Eastbound left exit and westbound entrance; southern terminus of SR 123
Alameda; ALA 48.04–0.00	Oakland	19.03	30.63	19B	West Street, San Pablo Avenue (SR 123)	Westbound exit and eastbound entrance; southern terminus of SR 123
Alameda; ALA 48.04–0.00	Oakland	19.89	32.01	19C	SR 24 east (Grove-Shafter Freeway) – Berkeley, Walnut Creek	Signed as exit 19B eastbound; provides direct access to Martin Luther King Jr Way / 51st Street; western terminus of SR 24; SR 24 exit 2B
Alameda; ALA 48.04–0.00	Oakland	19.89	32.01	19D	I-980 west (Grove-Shafter Freeway) to I-880 – Downtown Oakland	Signed as exit 19C eastbound; provides direct access to 27th Street / West Grand Avenue; eastern terminus of I-980; I-980 exit 2A; signed as only I-980 / Downtown Oakland from 1989–1998
Alameda; ALA 48.04–0.00	Oakland	20.23	32.56	20	Webster Street, Broadway-Auto Row	Eastbound exit only
Alameda; ALA 48.04–0.00	Oakland	20.76	33.41	21A	Harrison Street, Oakland Avenue, MacArthur Boulevard	MacArthur Boulevard not signed eastbound, Oakland Avenue not signed westbound
Alameda; ALA 48.04–0.00	Oakland	21.29– 21.56	34.26– 34.70	21B	Grand Avenue, Lakeshore Avenue	Signed as exits 21B (Grand Avenue) and 22A (Lakeshore Avenue) westbound
Alameda; ALA 48.04–0.00	Oakland	22.37	36.00	22B	Park Boulevard, 14th Avenue	Signed as exit 22 eastbound; 14th Avenue not signed eastbound
Alameda; ALA 48.04–0.00	Oakland	23.47	37.77	23	Fruitvale Avenue, Coolidge Avenue	Signed as exit 24 westbound; Coolidge Avenue not signed eastbound
Alameda; ALA 48.04–0.00	Oakland	23.75	38.22	24	35th Avenue	Eastbound exit and westbound entrance
Alameda; ALA 48.04–0.00	Oakland	24.82– 24.98	39.94– 40.20	25	MacArthur Boulevard, High Street	Signed as exits 25A (High Street) and 25B (MacArthur Boulevard) eastbound
Alameda; ALA 48.04–0.00	Oakland	25.82– 26.14	41.55– 42.07	26	SR 13 north (Warren Freeway) / Seminary Avenue – Berkeley	Signed as exits 26A (SR 13) and 26B (Seminary Avenue) westbound; southern terminus of SR 13; SR 13 exits 1A-B
Alameda; ALA 48.04–0.00	Oakland	26.75	43.05	27A	Edwards Avenue	Eastbound exit and westbound entrance
Alameda; ALA 48.04–0.00	Oakland	27.26	43.87	27B	Keller Avenue, Mountain Boulevard	Signed as exit 27 westbound
Alameda; ALA 48.04–0.00	Oakland	28.72	46.22	29A	Golf Links Road, 98th Avenue	Signed as exit 29 westbound
Alameda; ALA 48.04–0.00	Oakland	30.01	48.30	29B	106th Avenue, Foothill Boulevard	Eastbound exit and westbound entrance
Alameda; ALA 48.04–0.00	Oakland–San Leandro line	30.01	48.30	30	MacArthur Boulevard, Foothill Boulevard	Westbound exit and eastbound entrance
Alameda; ALA 48.04–0.00	Oakland–San Leandro line	30.58	49.21	31A	Dutton Avenue, Estudillo Avenue – Downtown San Leandro	Signed as exit 31 westbound; Dutton Avenue not signed westbound
Alameda; ALA 48.04–0.00	San Leandro	31.12	50.08	31B	Grand Avenue – Downtown San Leandro	Eastbound exit and westbound entrance
Alameda; ALA 48.04–0.00	San Leandro	31.63	50.90	32A	Benedict Drive	Westbound exit only
Alameda; ALA 48.04–0.00	San Leandro	32.21	51.84	32B	150th Avenue, Fairmont Drive	Signed as exit 32 eastbound
Alameda; ALA 48.04–0.00	San Leandro	33.34	53.66	33	164th Avenue, Miramar Avenue, Carolyn Street	Carolyn Street not signed eastbound, Miramar Avenue not signed westbound
Alameda; ALA 48.04–0.00	Castro Valley	34.25	55.12	34	SR 238 south – Hayward	No westbound exit; northern terminus of SR 238
Alameda; ALA 48.04–0.00	Castro Valley	34.25	55.12	34	I-238 north to I-880	Left exit westbound; southern terminus of I-238; I-238 exit 14
Alameda; ALA 48.04–0.00	Castro Valley	34.72	55.88	35	Strobridge Avenue	
Alameda; ALA 48.04–0.00	Castro Valley	35.58	57.26	36	Redwood Road – Castro Valley	Castro Valley not signed westbound
Alameda; ALA 48.04–0.00	Castro Valley	36.53	58.79	37	Grove Way, Crow Canyon Road	Eastbound signage; formerly signed as "Exit 36B/Center Street/Crow Canyon Road" before eastbound off-ramp was replaced in 2010
Alameda; ALA 48.04–0.00	Castro Valley	36.53	58.79	37	Castro Valley Boulevard	Westbound signage; the second westbound on-ramp located near Center Street was demolished in 2010
Alameda; ALA 48.04–0.00	Castro Valley	38.71	62.30	39	Eden Canyon Road, Palomares Road	
Alameda; ALA 48.04–0.00	Pleasanton–Dublin line	44.61	71.79	44A	San Ramon Road, Foothill Road – Dublin	
Alameda; ALA 48.04–0.00	Pleasanton–Dublin line	44.21	71.15	—	I-580 Express Lanes west ends	West end of westbound Express Lanes
Alameda; ALA 48.04–0.00	Pleasanton–Dublin line	44.21	71.15	44B	I-680 – Sacramento, San Jose	I-680 north exits 30A-B; south exit 30
Alameda; ALA 48.04–0.00	Pleasanton–Dublin line	45.08	72.55	45	Hopyard Road, Dougherty Road	
Alameda; ALA 48.04–0.00	Pleasanton–Dublin line	46.12	74.22	46	Hacienda Drive, Dublin Boulevard	Dublin Boulevard not signed eastbound
Alameda; ALA 48.04–0.00	Pleasanton–Dublin line	46.12	74.22	—	I-580 Express Lanes east begins	West end of eastbound Express Lanes
Alameda; ALA 48.04–0.00	Pleasanton–Dublin line	46.99	75.62	47	Santa Rita Road, Tassajara Road	
Alameda; ALA 48.04–0.00	Dublin	48.24	77.63	48	El Charro Road, Fallon Road	
Alameda; ALA 48.04–0.00	Livermore	49.97	80.42	50	Airway Boulevard, Collier Canyon Road	
Alameda; ALA 48.04–0.00	Livermore	50.84	81.82	51	SR 84 west (Isabel Avenue) / Portola Avenue	Eastern terminus of SR 84 southern section; opened in 2011
Alameda; ALA 48.04–0.00	Livermore	51.78	83.33	52A	Portola Avenue (CR J2)	Closed; former eastbound exit and westbound entrance were removed in 2011 as part of the Isabel Avenue project
Alameda; ALA 48.04–0.00	Livermore	52.41	84.35	52	North Livermore Avenue (CR J2) – Downtown Livermore	Formerly signed as exit 52B eastbound
Alameda; ALA 48.04–0.00	Livermore	54.25	87.31	54	First Street, Springtown Boulevard	Former SR 84
Alameda; ALA 48.04–0.00	Livermore	55.26	88.93	55	Vasco Road – Brentwood	Brentwood not signed westbound
Alameda; ALA 48.04–0.00	Livermore	55.80	89.80	Weigh station		
Alameda; ALA 48.04–0.00	Livermore	55.80	89.80	—	I-580 Express Lanes	East end of Express Lanes in both directions
Alameda; ALA 48.04–0.00	Livermore	56.68	91.22	57	North Greenville Road, Altamont Pass Road, Laughlin Road	Laughlin Road not signed eastbound, Altamont Pass Road not signed westbound
Alameda; ALA 48.04–0.00		58.99	94.94	59	North Flynn Road	
Alameda; ALA 48.04–0.00		58.99	94.94	Altamont Pass, elevation 1,009 feet (308 m)		
Alameda; ALA 48.04–0.00		63.49	102.18	63	Grant Line Road – Byron	
Alameda; ALA 48.04–0.00		64.84	104.35	65	I-205 east to I-5 north – Tracy, Stockton	Eastbound left exit and westbound entrance; western terminus of I-205; former US 50 east
Alameda; ALA 48.04–0.00		64.84	104.35	—	I-580 Truck west / Grant Line Road	Westbound truck bypass
San Joaquin; SJ 15.31–0.00		66.99	107.81	67	International Parkway, Patterson Pass Road	Being reconstructed to a diverging diamond interchange
San Joaquin; SJ 15.31–0.00	Tracy	72.38	116.48	72	Corral Hollow Road (CR J2)	
San Joaquin; SJ 15.31–0.00		76.01	122.33	76	SR 132 east to I-5 north – Modesto	Eastbound signage; western terminus of SR 132
San Joaquin; SJ 15.31–0.00		76.01	122.33	76	Chrisman Road to SR 132 east – Tracy, Modesto	Westbound signage; ramps connect directly to Chrisman Road to the south of its interchange with SR 132
San Joaquin; SJ 15.31–0.00		81.12	130.55	—	I-5 south – Fresno, Los Angeles	Access to I-5 north via exit 65 or 76; east end of I-580; I-5 north exit 446
1.000 mi = 1.609 km; 1.000 km = 0.621 mi: Closed/former; Concurrency terminus; Electronic toll collection; HOV only; Incomplete access

== In popular culture ==
- I-580 features prominently throughout the Sons of Anarchy series. The backstory of the series establishes that "First 9" (SAMCRO cofounder) John Teller died in a collision on November 13, 1993, 15 years before the pilot episode takes place, and SAMCRO establishes a roadside memorial to Teller near the crash site. In the final scenes of the series finale, Jax rides his father's restored classic motorcycle to visit that memorial, before taking a last ride on I-580.
- I-580 through the Altamont Pass is a stage in the 2011 racing video game Need for Speed: The Run.
