= CA-13 =

CA-13 may refer to:

- California's 13th congressional district
- California State Route 13
- CA-13 Boomerang, a World War II fighter aircraft
