= California State Route 123 =

Highway in California

State Route 123
- San Pablo Avenue
- SR 123 highlighted in red

Route information
- Maintained by Caltrans
- Length: 7.375 mi (11.869 km)

Major junctions
- South end: I-580 in Oakland
- SR 13 in Berkeley
- North end: I-80 in Richmond

Location
- Country: United States
- State: California
- Counties: Alameda, Contra Costa

Highway system
- State highways in California; Interstate; US; State; Scenic; History; Pre‑1964; Unconstructed; Deleted; Freeways
← SR 122	→ SR 124

State Route 123 (SR 123) is a 7.39-mile (11.89 km) state highway in the U.S. state of California in the San Francisco Bay Area. Named San Pablo Avenue for almost its entire length except for its northernmost 0.10 miles (0.16 km), SR 123 is a major north–south state highway along the flats of the urban East Bay. Route 123 runs between Interstate 580 in Oakland in the south and Interstate 80 at Cutting Boulevard in Richmond in the north. San Pablo Avenue itself, a portion of Historic US 40, continues well past the SR 123 designation south to Downtown Oakland and north to Crockett.

== Route description ==
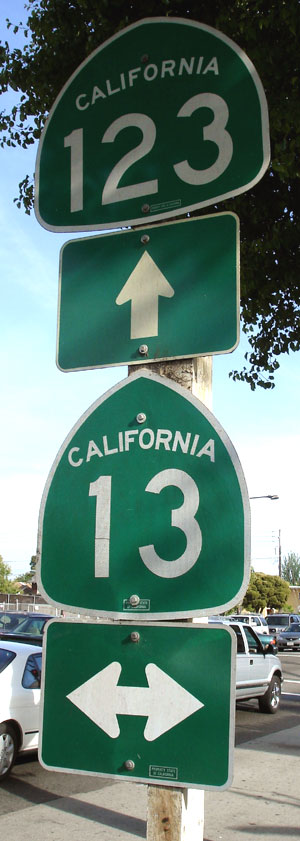
Route shield signs at the intersection of San Pablo Avenue (SR 123) and Ashby Avenue (State Route 13) in Berkeley.

Route 123 is defined in section 423 of the California Streets and Highways Code, and that the highway is "from Route 580 at San Pablo Avenue in Oakland to Route 80 in Richmond at Cutting Boulevard".

SR 123 is a four-lane boulevard with a median strip for its entire length. Its southern terminus is at the underpass of Interstate 580 in Oakland. Going north, it passes through the cities of Emeryville, Berkeley, Albany, and El Cerrito. It briefly turns on Cutting Boulevard before entering Richmond at its northern terminus under Interstate 80.

SR 123/San Pablo Avenue does not directly intersect with I-580 in Oakland, so drivers are instructed to get onto I-580 east via 35th Street, or I-80 east/I-580 west via West MacArthur Boulevard. The I-580 west on-ramp use to end just before the I-80 split at the MacArthur Maze, but was rebuilt c. 1990s to force traffic onto I-80 east and to prevent the merging and weaving of those trying to get onto I-80 west. Signage on I-580 does not mention SR 123; access is via I-580 west exit 19A/San Pablo Avenue/MacArthur Boulevard or I-580 east exit 19B/West Street. Signage on I-80 does not mention SR 123 either on SR 123's official northern terminus at exit 15/Cutting Boulevard or at the San Pablo Avenue intersection further north at I-80 exit 16B.

San Pablo Avenue is sometimes used as an alternate route to the Eastshore Freeway (I-80/I-580) when that freeway becomes very congested. Major intersections along this route include 40th Street, Ashby Avenue (SR 13), University Avenue (which leads to UC Berkeley), Gilman Street, Marin Avenue, Central Avenue and Cutting Boulevard.

Continuing on San Pablo Avenue past SR 123's southern terminus eventually leads to Downtown Oakland and Oakland City Hall where San Pablo Avenue ends. Continuing north on San Pablo Avenue after SR 123 turns west onto Cutting Boulevard in Richmond leads to the cities of San Pablo, Pinole, Hercules, Rodeo, and Crockett. In Hercules, San Pablo Avenue meets the terminus of SR 4 near I-80, and, after a discontinuity bridged by Parker Avenue in Rodeo, the road approaches the Carquinez Bridge and arrives in Crockett as Pomona Street.

An AC Transit Rapid Bus (72R-San Pablo Rapid) runs along San Pablo Avenue from Downtown Oakland to Contra Costa College in San Pablo. The express bus line was put in place after a Metropolitan Transportation Commission study determined that it would be more cost-effective than a previous proposal to install light rail along the route. The Bay Area Rapid Transit system runs its Richmond leg parallel to the route up to the El Cerrito del Norte station.

The Alvarado Adobe is located by the San Pablo City Hall on the corner of San Pablo Avenue and Church Lane.

SR 123 is part of the National Highway System, a network of highways that are considered essential to the country's economy, defense, and mobility by the Federal Highway Administration.

== History ==
San Pablo Avenue is one of the oldest existing roads in the East Bay. It originated in the Spanish colonial era as the Camino de la Contra Costa ("road of the opposite shore", i.e. opposite from the Presidio of San Francisco and the settlement around the Mission in San Francisco) and was legally a "camino real" ("royal road", i.e., property of the Spanish crown) until Mexico won its independence in 1821. It ran from the Encinal ("Oakland") landings of the Rancho San Antonio northward (actually northwestward) along the bayshore, then eastward just inland of the Carquinez Strait. It was the principal thoroughfare for the scattered ranches throughout this part of the East Bay.

The name persisted into the American era, when it was still called the "Contra Costa Road". On July 15, 1852, the Court of Sessions of Contra Costa County ordered the construction of a more direct and somewhat improved road along the same general route between the Rancho San Pablo and Oakland, which consequently became known as "The San Pablo Road". This segment subsequently became today's "San Pablo Avenue".

In 1927, this road was designated as part of the Lincoln Highway, the nation's first transcontinental road, upon the opening of the new highway bridge across the Carquinez Strait.

Prior to the construction of the Eastshore Highway, San Pablo Avenue was the main north–south route through the northern East Bay, carrying the designation U.S. Route 40 north of University Avenue in Berkeley (US 40 proceeded down to the foot of University Avenue and the end of the Berkeley Pier where an auto ferry transported motorists to the Hyde Street Pier in San Francisco). U.S. 40 was moved to the new highway after it was built (1930s), and about 25 years later took its current designation of Interstate 80. San Pablo Avenue was Business U.S. 40 until 1964.

During 2005–06, San Pablo Avenue was repaved and otherwise rehabilitated by Caltrans. Portions of San Pablo Avenue, particularly in Berkeley, Albany, and El Cerrito, are slowly transforming, with a mix of shops, restaurants and condominium developments.

In the early part of the 20th century, a streetcar line ran on San Pablo between Richmond and Oakland. Part of the Oakland segment of these tracks up to Grayson Street in Berkeley were used during World War II for the Shipyard Railway of the Key System which transported workers from the Key System's hub in Emeryville to the Kaiser Shipyards in Richmond.

== Major intersections ==
Except where prefixed with a letter, postmiles were measured on the road as it was in 1964, based on the alignment that existed at the time, and do not necessarily reflect current mileage. Postmile prefixes include: R reflecting a realignment in the route since then, M indicating a second realignment, L referring to an overlap due to a correction or change, and T indicating postmiles classified as temporary. Segments that remain unconstructed or have been relinquished to local control may be omitted. The numbers reset at county lines; the start and end postmiles in each county are given in the county column.

County	Location	Postmile	Destinations	Notes
Alameda; ALA 0.00-5.18	Oakland	0.00	San Pablo Avenue south	Continuation beyond I-580
Alameda; ALA 0.00-5.18	Oakland	0.00	I-580 east (MacArthur Freeway) / SR 24 east (Grove-Shafter Freeway) – Hayward, Stockton, Walnut Creek	Southern terminus; access to I-580 east/SR 24 east via 35th Street; I-580 east exit 19B; SR 24 east exit 2B
Alameda; ALA 0.00-5.18	Emeryville	0.01	I-80 east (I-580 west, Eastshore Freeway)	On-ramp was reconfigured in the 1990s to close off outbound access to I-80 west; access via West MacArthur Boulevard; I-580 west exit 19A
Alameda; ALA 0.00-5.18	Berkeley	1.91	SR 13 (Ashby Avenue) to I-80 (I-580, Eastshore Freeway) – Walnut Creek, San Francisco	
Contra Costa; CC 0.00-2.20	El Cerrito	1.75	Potrero Avenue to I-80 west (Eastshore Freeway) – Oakland, San Francisco	
Contra Costa; CC 0.00-2.20	El Cerrito	2.10	San Pablo Avenue north, Cutting Boulevard east	SR 123 north turns onto Cutting Boulevard west
Contra Costa; CC 0.00-2.20	Richmond	2.20	I-80 east (Eastshore Freeway) – Sacramento	Northern terminus; no outbound access to I-80 west, no inbound access from I-80 east; I-80 east exit 15
Contra Costa; CC 0.00-2.20	Richmond	2.20	Cutting Boulevard west – San Rafael	Continuation beyond I-80
1.000 mi = 1.609 km; 1.000 km = 0.621 mi: Incomplete access
