= Caldecott Tunnel =

Highway tunnel between Oakland and Orinda, California

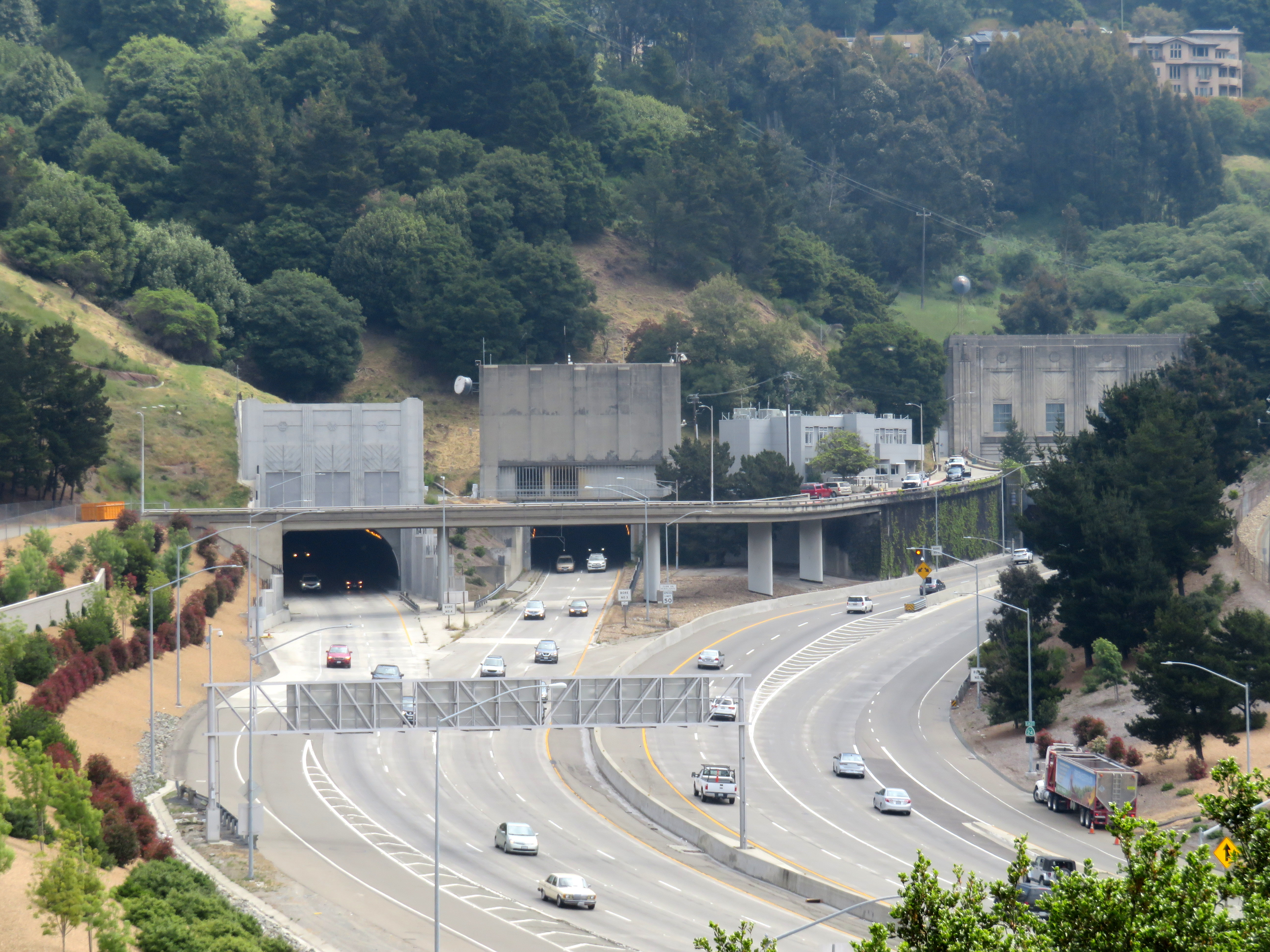
- The western end of the Caldecott Tunnel in 2019

Overview
- Location: Oakland / Contra Costa County, California
- Coordinates: 37.8548°N 122.2166°W
- Route: SR 24 (William Byron Rumford Freeway)
- Crosses: Berkeley Hills
- Start: Near Caldecott Lane
- End: Fish Ranch Road

Operation
- Opened: Bores 1 & 2: 1937; Bore 3: 1964; Bore 4: 2013
- Operator: Caltrans

Technical
- Length: Bores 1 & 2: 3,610 ft (1,100 m); Bore 3: 3,771 ft (1,149 m); Bore 4: 3,389 ft (1,033 m)
- No. of lanes: 2 per bore
- Tunnel clearance: Bore 1: 14.58 feet (4.44 m); Bore 2: 14.5 feet (4.4 m); Bore 3: 15.5 feet (4.7 m); Bore 4: 15.5 feet (4.7 m)

Oakland Designated Landmark
- Designated: 1980
- Reference no.: 32

The Caldecott Tunnel is a four-bore highway tunnel through the Berkeley Hills between Oakland and Orinda, California. Its four bores carry California State Route 24. Named after Thomas E. Caldecott, former mayor of Berkeley, it opened in 1937 as a two-bore tunnel. The third bore opened in 1964 and the fourth bore in 2013. Currently, the two oldest bores carry eastbound traffic and the two newest bores carry westbound traffic.

== Description ==
The east–west tunnel is signed as a part of California State Route 24 and connects Oakland to central Contra Costa County. It is named after Thomas E. Caldecott (1878–1951), who was mayor of Berkeley in 1930–1932, a member of the Alameda County Board of Supervisors in 1933–1945, and president of Joint Highway District 13, which built the first two bores.

Bore 1 (the southernmost bore) and Bore 2 were completed in 1937; they are 3,610 ft (1,100 m) in length and today carry two lanes each of eastbound traffic. Bore 3, completed in 1964, is 3,771 ft (1,149 m) in length. Bore 4 (the northernmost bore), completed in 2013, is 3,389 ft (1,033 m) in length. Bores 3 and 4 carry two lanes each of westbound traffic.

The active Hayward Fault runs just west of the western portals of the tunnel.

== History ==
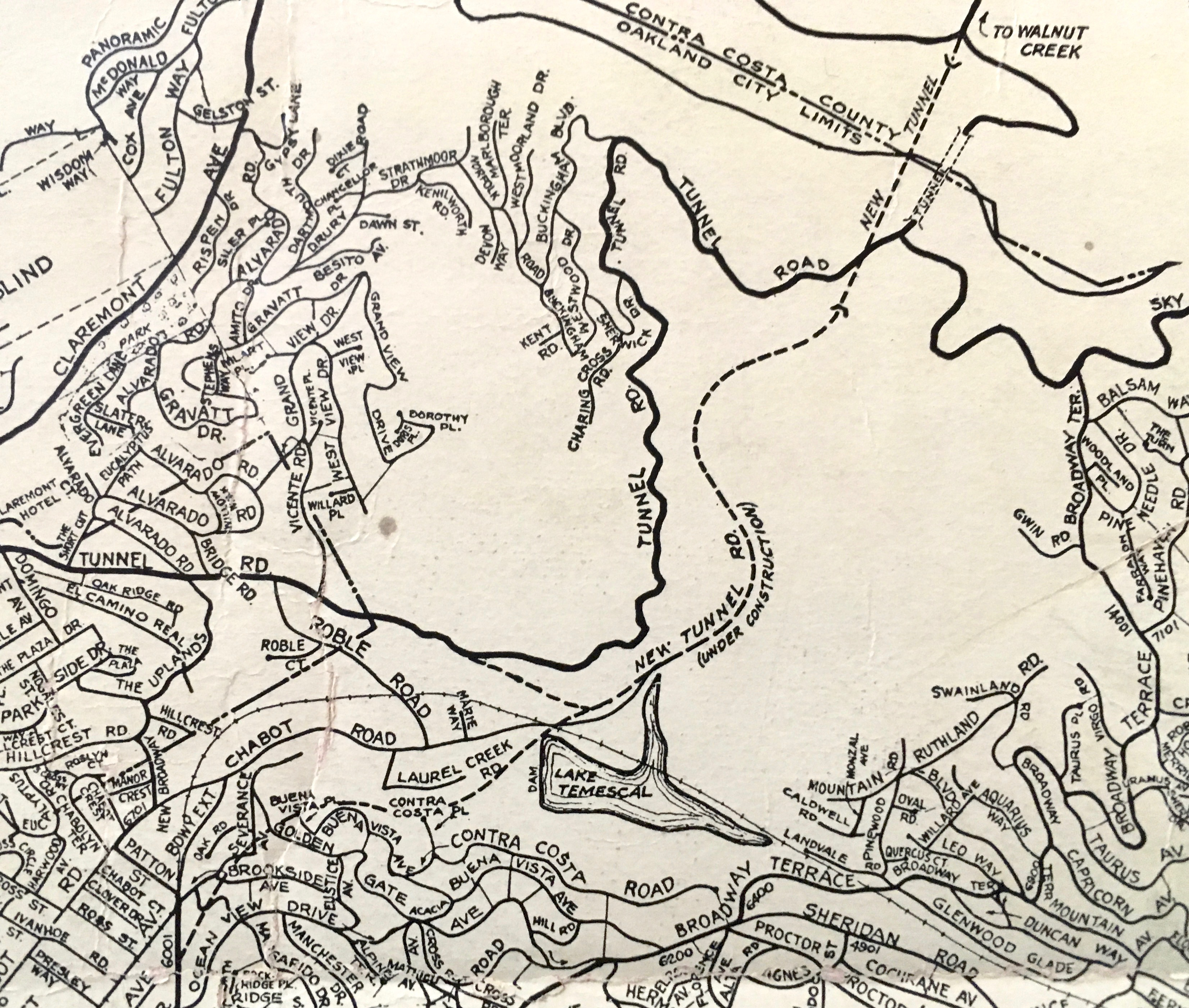
Traffic patterns in 1937

In the 19th century, traffic over the Berkeley Hills in this area went up Harwood Canyon, now known as Claremont Canyon (behind the Claremont Hotel). The road leading up the canyon from the west was initially called Harwood's Road, later changed to Telegraph Road, and finally, Claremont. The road on the other side of the hills became known as Fish Ranch Road, its current name, some time after 1870, the year the Oakland Trout Company incorporated its fish and frog farm in the vicinity. An inn and stage coach stop called the Summit House once existed at the summit.

The idea of a tunnel through the hills began as early as 1860. In that year, the idea was proposed and rejected by the citizens of Alameda and Contra Costa Counties. It was revived in 1871 in a private attempt led by L.W. Kennedy which however failed after boring about 200 feet into the hills from the east side of the hills above the location of today's Caldecott Tunnel when water was struck, washing out the work. Bankruptcy followed and the effort, which came to be known as the "old Kennedy tunnel" was abandoned. A franchise was subsequently granted to a group of developers who passed the franchise onto another group. The proposal languished until the turn of the century.

Just before the end of the 19th century, the tunnel idea was revived and discussed by business and government representatives of Contra Costa and Alameda Counties. These discussions led to a new tunnel construction project at the approximate location of the old Kennedy tunnel attempt. The work on the Contra Costa side proceeded based on the old tunnel alignment while work on the Alameda County side started from the top of Temescal Canyon. On the west side, the project involved the construction of a proper approach road. The new road, dubbed "Tunnel Road", was built from the top of Russell Street in Berkeley (later realigned with Ashby Avenue) at the foot of Claremont Canyon and ran around the spur separating that canyon from Temescal Canyon, climbing along the slope of the spur to the summit of the Berkeley Hills until it reached the west portal of the new tunnel. The west end of the tunnel was at about 37.8561°N 122.2137°W while the east end of the tunnel is now in private property owned by the East Bay Regional Park District, on the former site of the Canary Cafe.

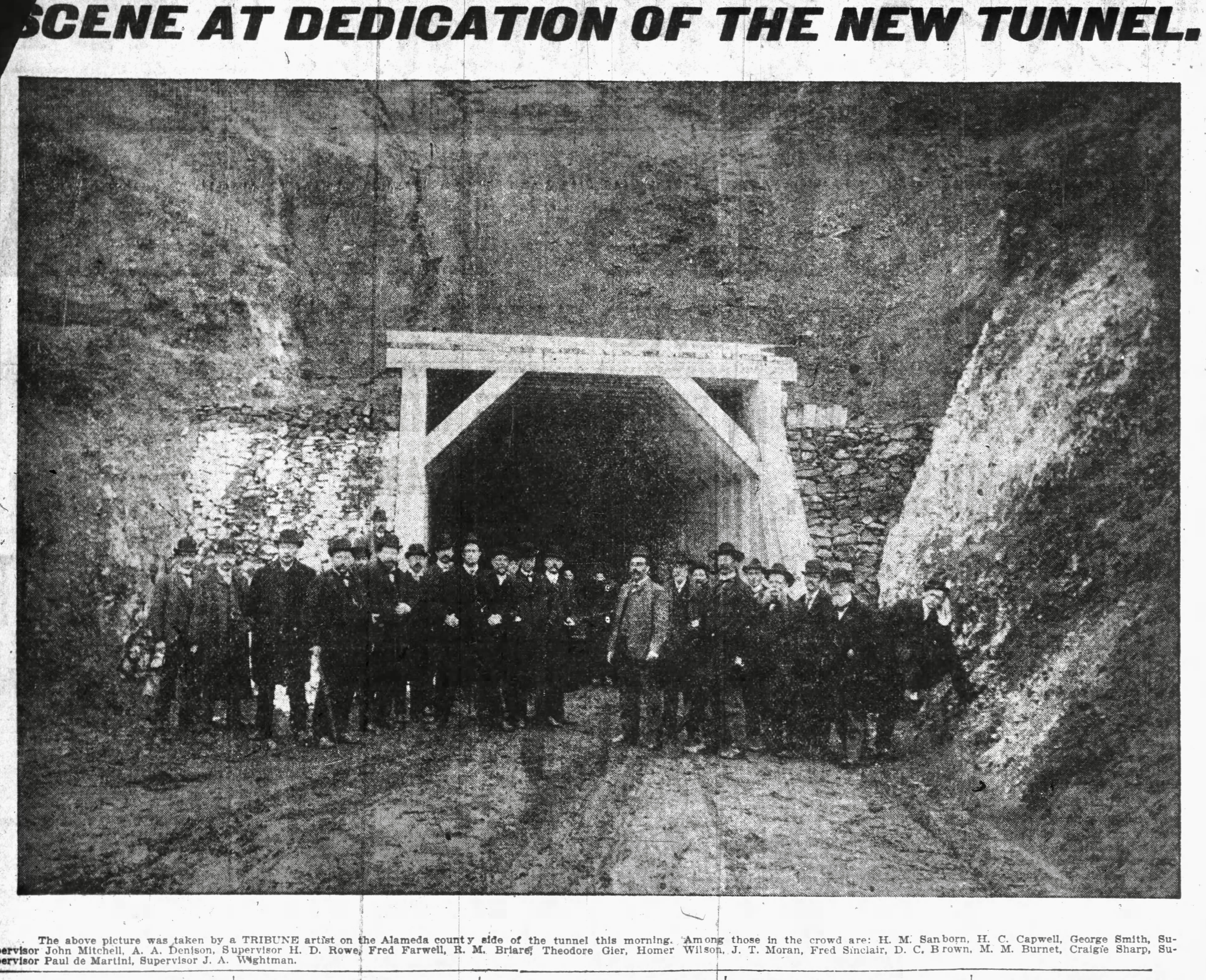
"Scene at Dedication of New Tunnel" Oakland Tribune, November 4, 1903

The tunnel was dedicated on November 4, 1903 as the "Inter-County Tunnel". A system of lighting a small fire with a newspaper was used to control this one-way traffic. The tunnel height was increased in 1915 by 3 feet to accommodate larger vehicles. After the new Broadway (Caldecott) tunnel was opened at the end of 1937, the old tunnel was used mostly by pedestrians until it was sealed in 1947.

=== Original twin bores ===
In November 1926, the Counties of Alameda and Contra Costa, and the City of Oakland agreed to the construction of a new tunnel through the Berkeley Hills to replace the old, small, decrepit and increasingly inadequate existing tunnel. In 1929, Alameda and Contra Costa County formed Joint Highway District 13 to accomplish this goal. Surveys and preliminary work on the approaches began in 1931.

On June 17, 1934, construction of the first two bores of the Caldecott Tunnel began.

The project included an extension of Broadway from its existing termination point below the hills some two miles from the planned west portal of the new tunnel. This required some major earth-moving efforts, both cutting and filling as well as buttressing, especially up in Temescal Canyon. This included filling in one of the inlets of Lake Temescal as well as part of the upper canyon where Broadway was to run.

The entire project was completed in 1937, and the tunnel opened to traffic on December 5 of that year. The tunnel was named the Broadway Low Level Tunnel (commonly shortened to Broadway Tunnel), since the principal through access was from Broadway in Oakland, and was located below the portal of the old Inter County Tunnel. However, access from Ashby Avenue was retained as it was designated the connecting thoroughfare from the Eastshore Highway (re-engineered as a freeway in the mid 1950s) and the new San Francisco–Oakland Bay Bridge, and dubbed State Highway 24. The approach to the east portal on the other side of the Berkeley Hills was via Mount Diablo Boulevard, also at that time part of State Highway 24.

In 1960, the Broadway Low Level Tunnel was renamed, becoming the Caldecott Tunnel.

=== Third bore and traffic reversal ===
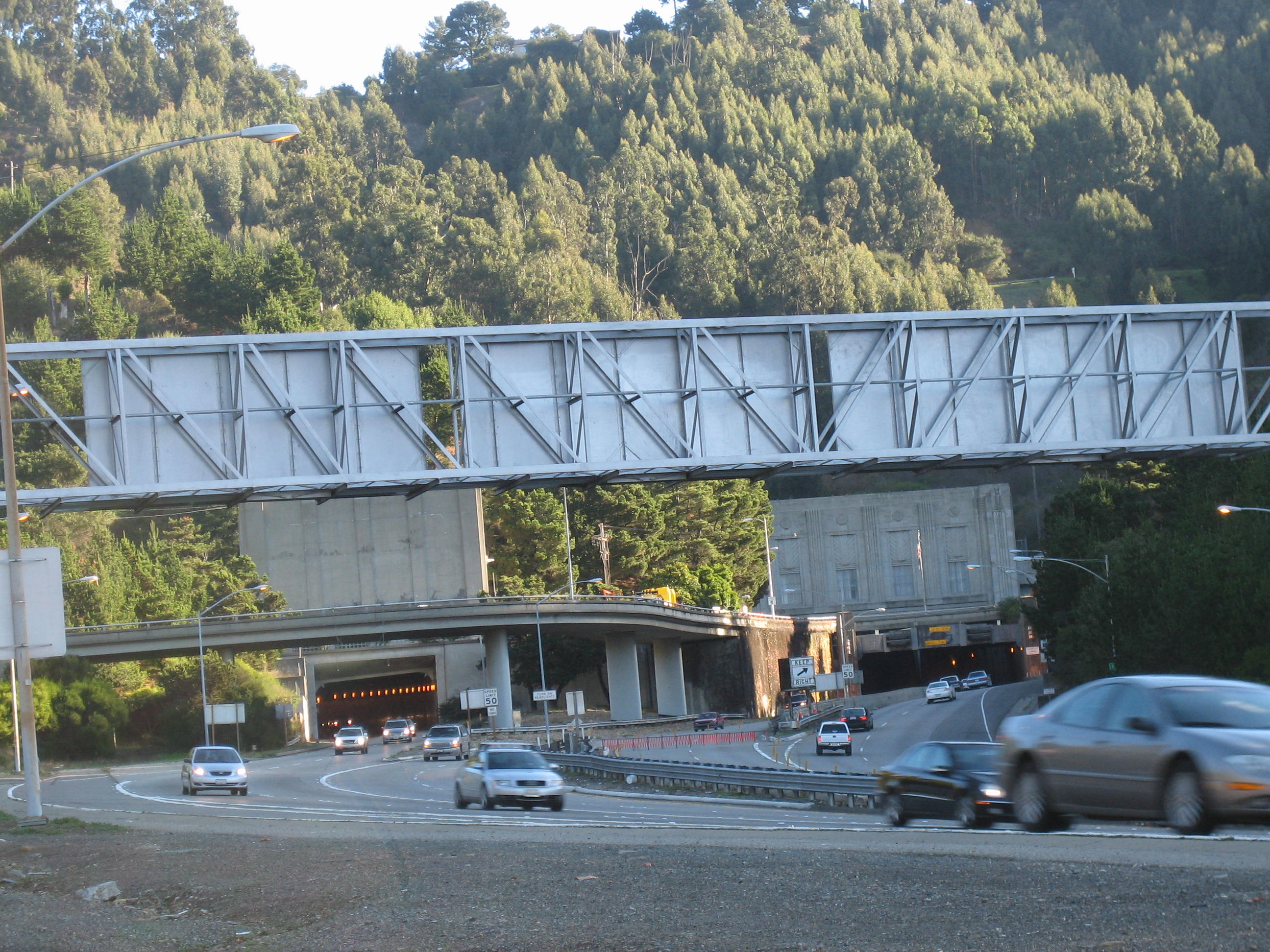
The Caldecott Tunnel prior to the construction of the fourth bore, as seen from the western end. From left to right: Bores 3, 2, and 1. Bore 2 was serving westbound traffic at the time of this photograph.

By 1960, the Division of Highways had rebuilt the eastern approach to the tunnel into a freeway. With Contra Costa County accessible by freeway, its change from an agricultural community into a major suburb accelerated.

The Division of Highways purchased sufficient right-of-way to the north of the existing twin bores to build another pair of bores. Given the traffic counts and the expense of tunnel construction, the construction of two additional bores would have been seen as unnecessary and extravagant. However, with the traffic count exceeding 50,000 vehicles per day, the state embarked on a project to build a third bore at the Caldecott Tunnel.

The project broke ground in 1960 and was opened to traffic in October 1964. When the third bore was opened, the other bores were closed one at a time for maintenance, including the installation of a continuous row of fluorescent lights. The new third bore made it possible to provide four lanes to accommodate the heavier commute-direction traffic by reversing the traffic flow of the middle bore.

The third bore also brought new technology to the tunnel with the installation of the "pop-up" lane control. Plastic lane delineators were set in tubes within the pavement. With the touch of a button, water would fill tubes to cause the delineators to pop up from the pavement; the middle bore was closed to one direction of travel while opening it to another. During the week, the middle bore of the Caldecott was reversed between 2:00 am and 5:00 am to favor westbound traffic, and then switched again some time between 11:30 am and noon to favor eastbound traffic. Ballgames, concerts and other events made balancing weekend traffic through the tunnel very difficult. It was not uncommon to reverse the middle bore six times on a Saturday or Sunday. The pop-up system still required substantial labor to implement. While it did eliminate the need to set down individual cones to separate traffic, Caltrans maintenance workers had to direct traffic out of the closing lanes to prevent vehicles from getting caught on the wrong side of the pop-up delineators.

A portion of the material excavated for the third bore was used in the construction of embankments for the MacArthur Freeway project between the MacArthur Maze and Broadway in Oakland.

In the late 1960s, the Grove-Shafter Freeway was completed and replaced Broadway as the main route to the Caldecott Tunnel from Oakland as well as replacing Ashby for traffic coming from San Francisco. Ashby Avenue and Tunnel Road were redesignated State Highway 13 and aligned with the new Warren Freeway through the Montclair District of Oakland. The Grove-Shafter Freeway was then designated State Highway 24. In 1980, the freeway was renamed after William Byron Rumford.

=== Tunnel fire ===
On April 7, 1982, an accident involving a gasoline tanker truck in the third (then-northernmost) bore set off the Caldecott Tunnel fire. The accident caused major damage and the bore was closed to traffic for several months while repairs were made, with traffic temporarily reverting to the pre-third-bore configuration. During the fire, the tunnel acted as a natural chimney, venting the smoke, flames and heat uphill towards the eastern entrance to the tunnel. The accident and fire killed seven people, most of whom were overcome by toxic smoke. The fire occurred shortly after midnight when there were few cars in the tunnel; had it occurred during normal commute hours, hundreds could have died. As a result of the fire, it is now illegal to transport hazardous material in a tanker truck through the tunnel, except between the light-traffic hours of 3:00 am and 5:00 am.

=== Oakland firestorm ===
On October 20, 1991, the catastrophic Oakland firestorm started on the ridge north of the Caldecott Tunnel. The fire spread quickly west down both sides of the west portal of the tunnel and jumped from the East to the West side of highway 13, eventually killing 25 people and destroying over 3,000 homes, apartments and condominiums.

=== Awards ===
The Caldecott Tunnel was designated a City of Oakland Landmark in 1980, and received a Preservation Award from the Art Deco Society of California in 1993.

=== Fourth bore ===
To relieve traffic congestion in the reverse commute direction, the California Department of Transportation began planning for a fourth bore in 2000. In 2007, the California Transportation Commission approved the final funding needed to build the fourth bore. Construction started in 2010. Commencement of the project was stalled as a result of the 2008 financial crisis, but was quickly back on track as a beneficiary of President Obama's American Recovery and Reinvestment Act of 2009 (ARRA). Construction got underway until completion in 2013. Much of the excavated material from the bore was trucked to Treasure Island for use in soil augmentation and remediation during the subsequent redevelopment of the island.

The fourth bore contains a roadway with two 12-foot-wide (3.7 m) traffic lanes, one 10-foot-wide (3.0 m) shoulder, and one 2-foot-wide (0.6 m) shoulder, ventilation, air and traffic monitoring systems, traffic lights, and electronic message boards. There are emergency exits to the third bore. When the fourth bore was opened to traffic, the need for the daily traffic reversal was eliminated; two bores (four lanes) serve each direction at all times, although individual bores may be closed during periods of light use for maintenance purposes.

== Weather phenomena ==
Weather conditions can vary greatly from one end of the tunnel to the other. In summer, for example, motorists may enter the tunnel from the east where it is sunny and warm, and emerge on the west end into fog and cold. In winter, during spells of inland tule fog, the reverse can occur.

== In popular culture ==
The Caldecott Tunnel appears in many of Rick Riordan's books, acting as an entrance to Camp Jupiter. In The Tyrant's Tomb, it is the site of the final battle between the protagonists Apollo and Frank Zhang and the Roman emperors Commodus and Caligula.

The Caldecott Tunnel also appears in the 1998 film What Dreams May Come, based on the novel by science fiction author Richard Matheson, as the site of a car accident which triggers supernatural occurrences.

== See also ==
- Berkeley Hills Tunnel — BART rail transit tunnel, running approximately parallel to, and north of, the Caldecott Tunnel.
