= Ygnacio Valley Road =

Major road in central Contra Costa County, California, United States

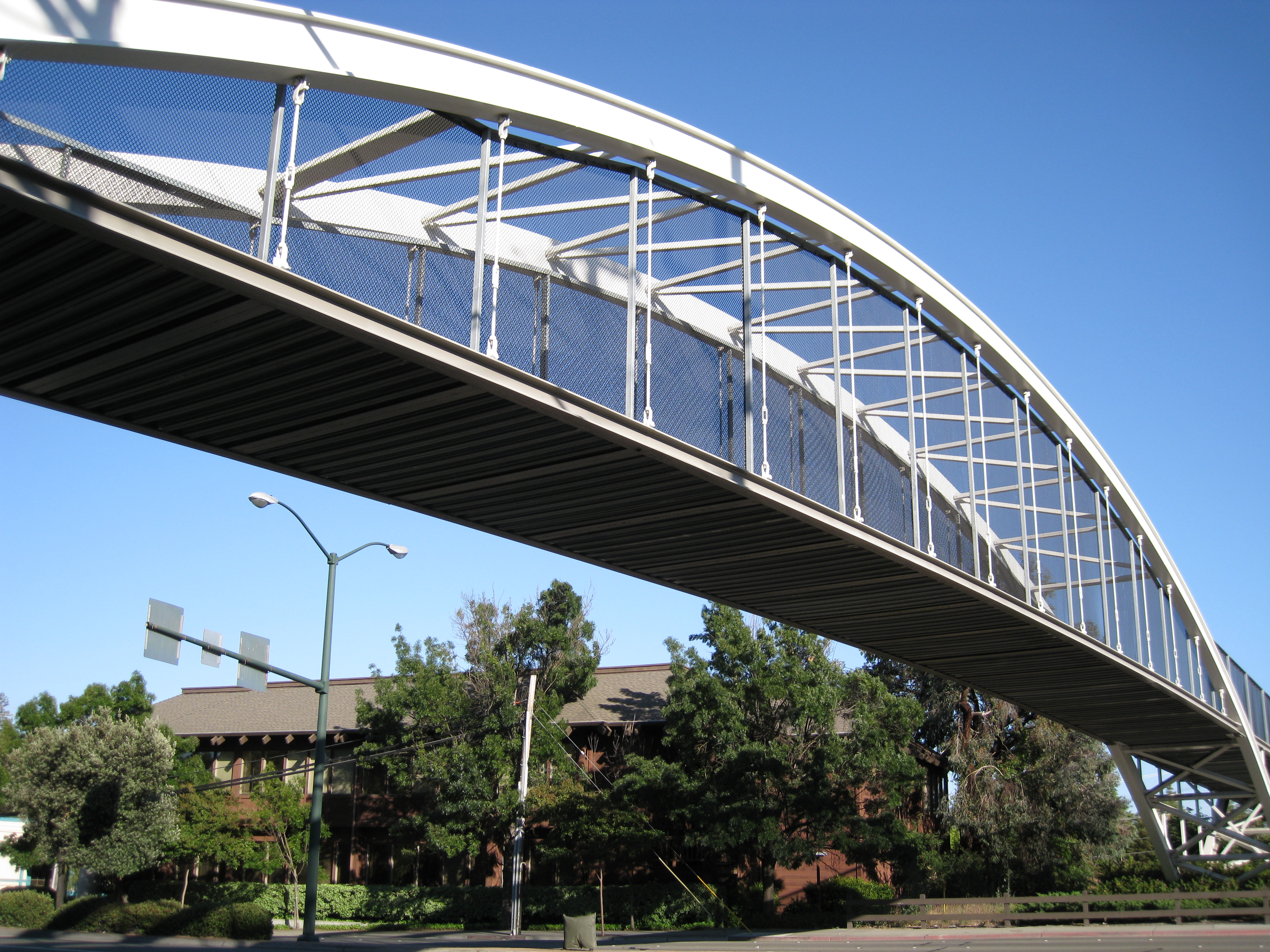
- Iron Horse Regional Trail pedestrian bridge over Ygnacio Valley Road
- Ygnacio Valley Road highlighted in red
- Maintained by: Walnut Creek, Concord, Pittsburg, and Contra Costa County, California
- Length: 15.66 mi (25.20 km)
- Southwest end: Parkside Drive in Walnut Creek
- Major junctions: I-680 / SR 24 in Walnut Creek; SR 4 in Pittsburg
- Northeast end: E 3rd St in Pittsburg

Ygnacio Valley Road is a major arterial road in central Contra Costa County, California. It extends from Interstate 680 and SR 24 in Walnut Creek to SR 4 in Pittsburg. The road passes through Concord and borders Clayton. In the northern half of the route, it is also known as Kirker Pass Road and then Railroad Avenue. It is listed, but not signed, as Hillside Avenue at its southwest terminus.

== Route ==
The route begins near the Interstate 680/Highway 24 junction, at the westbound entrance to Highway 24 at Ygnacio Valley Road, although this portion is actually signed as Hillside Avenue. It then changes signage to Ygnacio Valley Road through an interchange with I-680 and continues though downtown Walnut Creek and Heather Farm Park.

The road then enters Concord through Lime Ridge Open Space and continues into the Clayton Valley neighborhood. After the intersection with Clayton Road, its signage changes to Kirker Pass Road. It then makes an approximately 4.5 mile-long pass over the northern Diablo Range. It then enters Pittsburg, where it changes signage to Railroad Avenue at the Buchanan Road intersection. From here it continues through central Pittsburg before terminating at East 3rd St near the Pittsburg Marina.

=== Major Intersections ===
The entire route is in Contra Costa County.

Location	mi	km	Destinations	Notes
Pittsburg	0	0.0	E 3rd Street	
Pittsburg	1.15	1.85	SR 4 – Concord, Antioch	Interchange; SR 4 exit 23
Pittsburg	2.55	4.10	Buchanan Road	
Concord	7.80	12.55	Clayton Road	
Concord	9.89	15.92	Cowell Road	
Walnut Creek	11.89	19.14	Oak Grove Road	
Walnut Creek	13.06	21.02	Walnut Avenue / Bancroft Road	
Walnut Creek	14.53	23.38	Walnut Boulevard	
Walnut Creek	14.77	23.77	Civic Drive	
Walnut Creek	15.08	24.27	North Main Street to I-680 north – Sacramento	No Interchange
Walnut Creek	15.45	24.86	I-680 – Concord, Sacramento, San Jose	Northbound exit 46B; no northbound entrance
Walnut Creek	15.66	25.20	Parkside Drive	
1.000 mi = 1.609 km; 1.000 km = 0.621 mi
