= Telegraph Avenue =

Street in Oakland and Berkeley, California

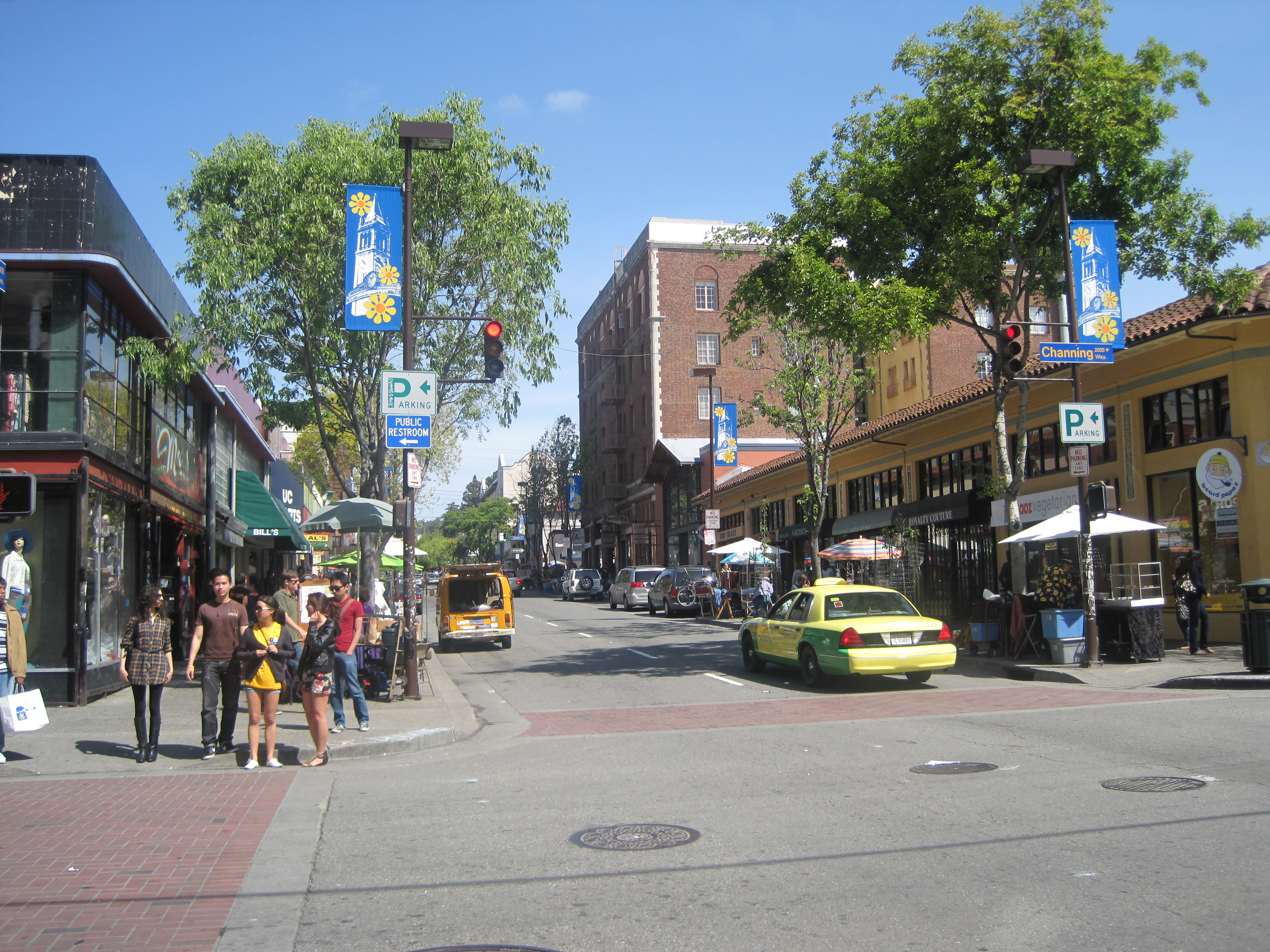
- The northern end of Telegraph Avenue in Berkeley
- Interactive map of Telegraph Avenue
- Length: 4.5 mi (7.2 km)
- Location: Berkeley and Oakland, California
- South end: Broadway in Downtown Oakland
- Major junctions: 51st Street west to SR 24 in Oakland; SR 24 east in Oakland; SR 13 / Ashby Avenue in Berkeley
- North end: Bancroft Way at the southern edge of UC Berkeley

Telegraph Avenue is a street that begins, at its southernmost point, in the midst of the historic downtown district of Oakland, California, and ends, at its northernmost point, at the southern edge of the University of California, Berkeley campus in Berkeley, California. It is approximately 4.5 miles (7.2 km) in length.

Among some Berkeley residents, especially University of California students, Telegraph refers mainly to a four-block section just south of the university, from Bancroft Way (which borders the campus) to Dwight Way. As a center of campus and community life, this section of Telegraph Avenue is home to many restaurants, bookstores, and clothing shops, along with street vendors occupying its wide sidewalks. Here Telegraph Avenue attracts a diverse audience of visitors, including college students, tourists, hippies, artists, street punks, eccentrics, and the homeless.

== Origins ==
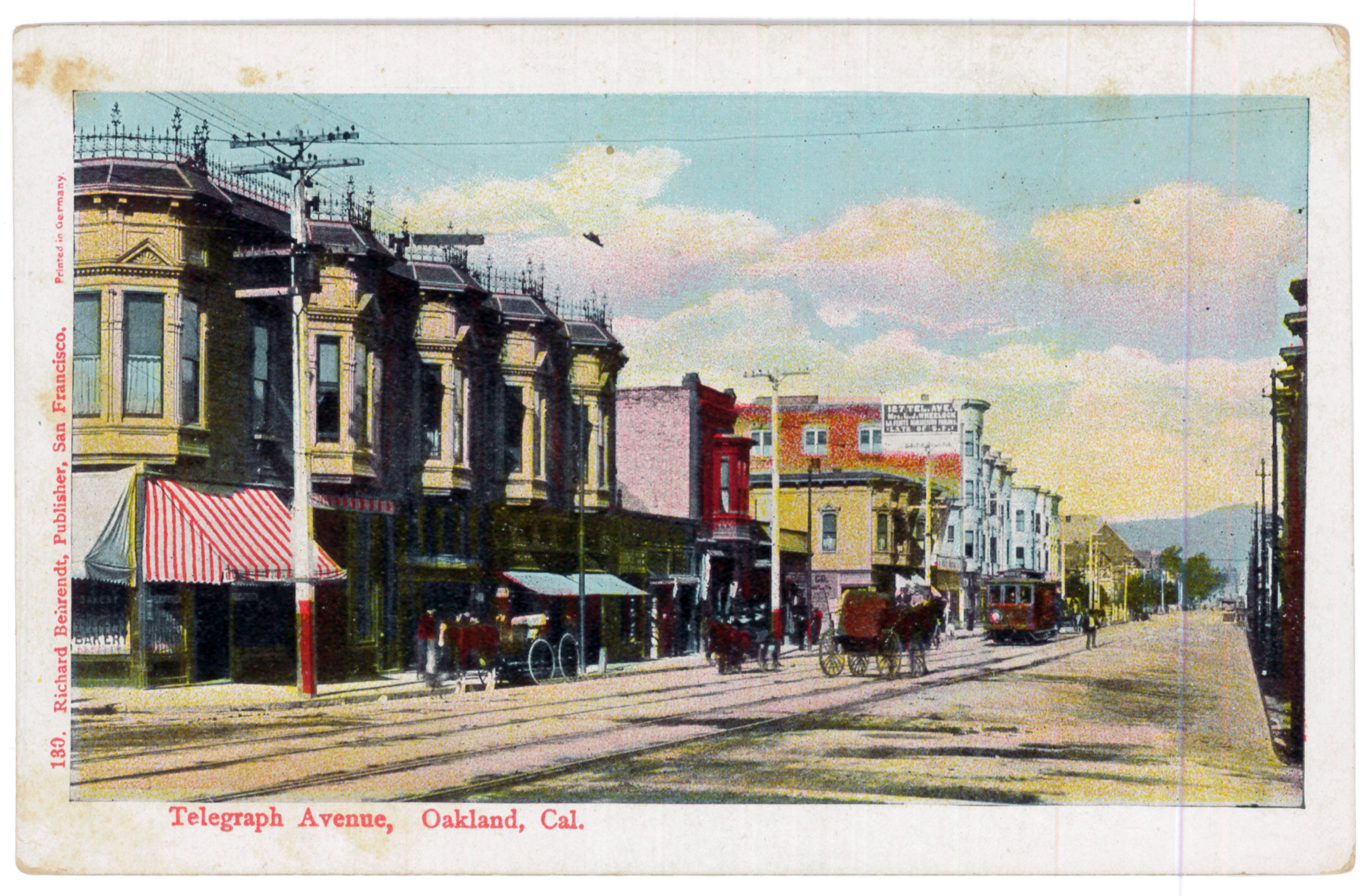
Looking north on Telegraph from Downtown around the turn of the 19th and 20th centuries

Telegraph Avenue originated from several separately named thoroughfares.

In 1859, a telegraph line was constructed between Oakland and Martinez by the Alta Telegraph Company, and the existing roads which ran alongside it were then renamed "Telegraph Road". The segment of the Telegraph Road which ran from downtown Oakland out to the Peralta estate in Temescal was previously known as the "Peralta Road". The segment which ran to and up Harwood's (now Claremont) Canyon was first known as "Harwood's Road", named for William Harwood, an early Oakland politician who leased grazing land in the canyon.

The Telegraph Road followed the route of present-day Telegraph Avenue from Downtown Oakland to Temescal, then ran along what is now the route of Claremont Avenue up to the summit of the Berkeley Hills where it became Fish Ranch Road, named some time after 1870, the year the Oakland Trout Company incorporated its fish and frog farm in the vicinity.

In Berkeley, the trustees of the private College of California (the predecessor of the University of California) laid out a residential subdivision south of their new campus in order to finance its construction. The streets were named alphabetically from east to west; the third street was named "Choate Street", after Rufus Choate. Oakland subsequently extended a road to connect with Berkeley's Choate, but named it "Humboldt Avenue".

Oakland's first horsecar line was built in 1869 and ran along Telegraph Road to 36th Street. It was extended to Temescal a year later, then to the university campus via Humboldt and Choate after the university relocated from Oakland in 1873. A business district grew up along Choate and Humboldt Streets. The horsecar line was eventually replaced by a steam dummy line, and later by an electric streetcar line. This transportation corridor stimulated the development of neighborhoods along its route, as well as an amusement park, Idora Park, between 56th and 58th Streets.

When the segment of Telegraph Road leading up to Harwood's Canyon was renamed "Claremont" to suit the interests of a developer of the district (see Claremont, Oakland/Berkeley, California), the cities of Berkeley and Oakland opted to change Humboldt and Choate to Telegraph since Oakland's portion of the thoroughfare was already aligned with what remained of the old Telegraph Road between the new Claremont and downtown Oakland. Since Telegraph Road was a county road, a petition to change its name to Claremont Avenue was presented to the Alameda County Board of Supervisors on January 12, 1880. The petition was granted.

Although the 1880 petition included it, the segment of the old Telegraph Road that ran up the canyon to the summit of the Berkeley Hills was renamed Claremont Road by the Oakland City Council (which by then had annexed the previously unincorporated area) on February 14, 1913, acting on a petition by the owners of the Claremont Hotel. The only discernible difference in naming was the substitution of "Road" for "Avenue" for the canyon segment.

Berkeley changed Choate Street to Telegraph Avenue in 1890.

== Early-mid 20th century ==
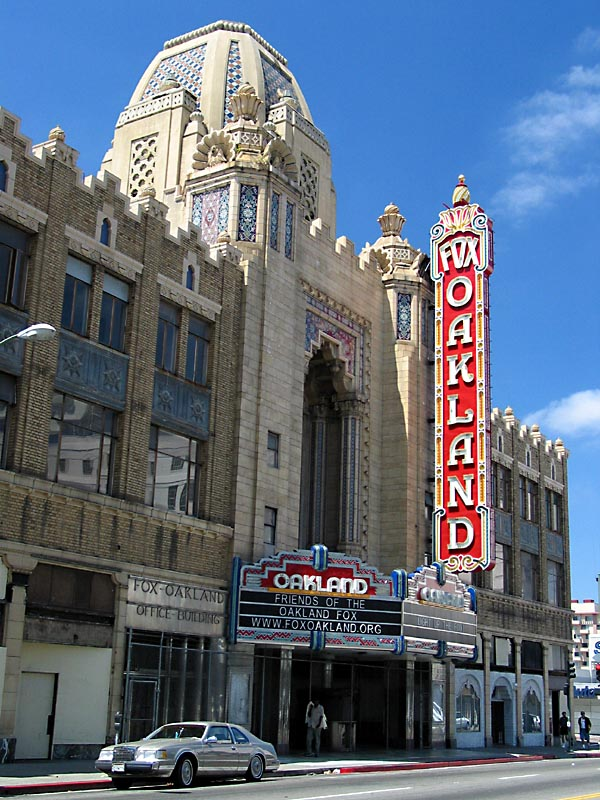
The Fox Theatre is located on the southern end of Telegraph Avenue, in Downtown Oakland.

In 1910, Sather Gate was built at the northern end of Telegraph Avenue. The university built Sproul Hall on Telegraph in the 1940s. In the 1950s the campus expanded south to Bancroft Way; Telegraph Avenue was shortened by 1½ blocks and buildings were demolished to make room for Sproul Plaza and several other new buildings including the new student union building.

The Berkeley end of Telegraph Avenue, along with Sproul Plaza, has been the site of numerous protests and riots beginning in the 1960s. In 1969, Telegraph was the site of massive confrontation between police and demonstrators during the conflict over People's Park. Alameda County Sheriff's deputies killed one man (James Rector) and permanently blinded another (Alan Blanchard) when they fired buckshot loaded shotguns at people sitting on the roof above Telegraph Ave. At one point, protesters were chased down Telegraph as far as Willard Junior High School (now Willard Middle School) at Derby Street, with Sheriff's deputies firing teargas canisters onto the school grounds.

The 1960s also saw the construction of the Grove Shafter Freeway, which parallels Telegraph Avenue half a block west, between Downtown Oakland and 56th Street. The freeway created a wall between Telegraph Avenue and present day Martin Luther King Jr. Way (formerly Grove Street), and sliced the Temescal District in half.

== Post–Vietnam War era ==
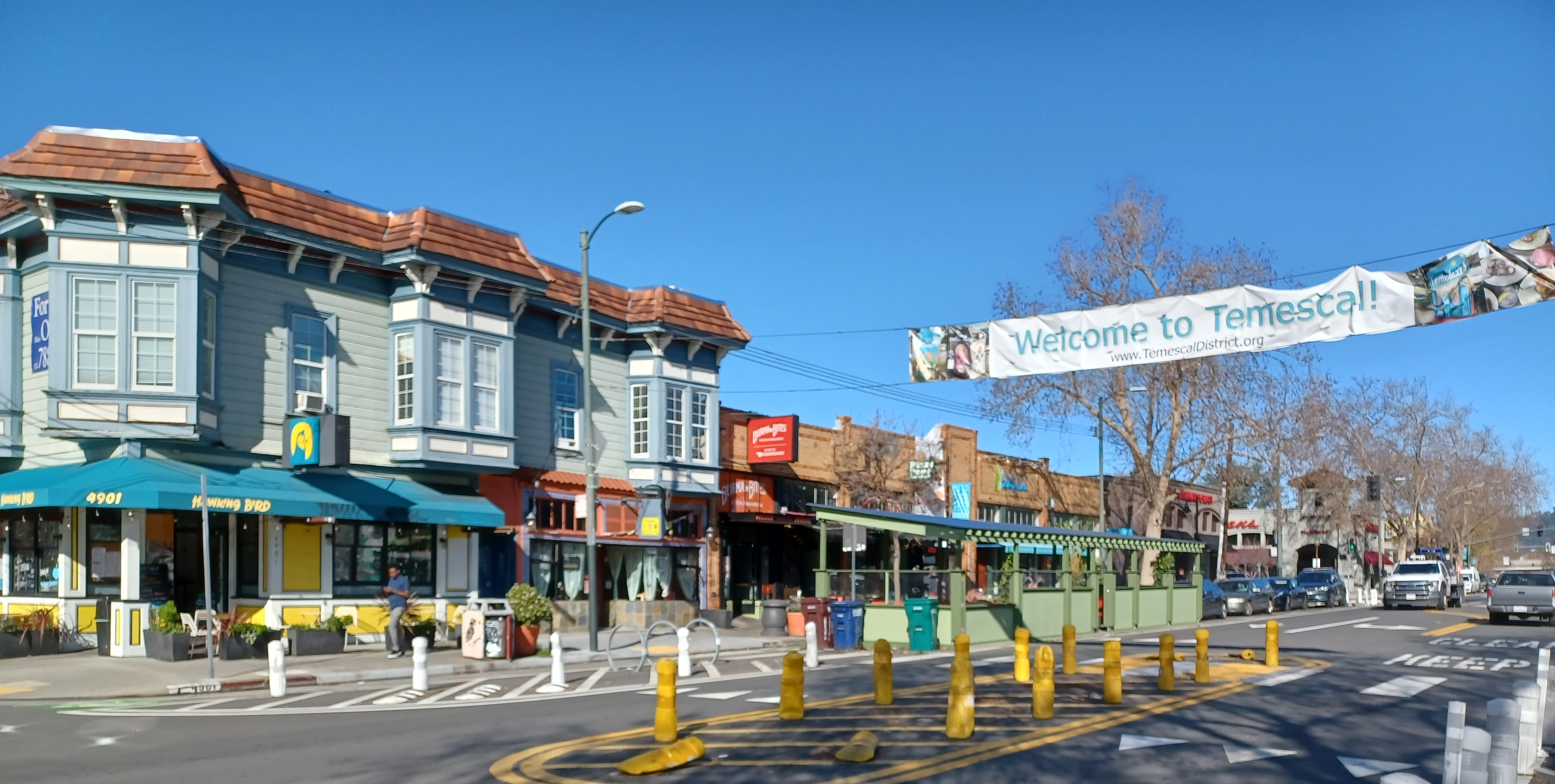
Telegraph Avenue in 2023

The events of the 1960s and 1970s had made Telegraph, as well as Berkeley, a symbol of the counterculture of the 1960s. Over the next couple of decades the Berkeley end of Telegraph became home to increasing numbers of homeless people and panhandlers, and by the 1990s had become a destination point for runaways from around the United States. The numbers of panhandlers have decreased since a series of police sweeps in the late 1990s. University students remain the largest daily population on Telegraph, which still serves as the anchor of food, culture and student life on the south side of campus.

More recently, a Korean business district has emerged just south of Temescal along Telegraph Ave. Attempts to change the name of the area to Koreatown have led to controversy, as most residents of the surrounding neighborhoods do not identify as Korean or Korean-American. A large Ethiopian and Eritrean population has also resulted in a string of Ethiopian restaurants, cafes and social clubs, stretching along Telegraph from about 30th Street in Oakland all the way into Berkeley.

As a result of heavy foot traffic and the narrow width of the street, the segment extending from Dwight Way north to the UC Berkeley campus was designated as a one-way street by the city (c.1969), and there have been talks of completely eliminating car access, a topic still hotly debated in the city council. A proposal by AC Transit to build a Bus rapid transit line on Telegraph has stirred up controversy, especially on the northern end where it might result in the elimination of parking and/or car access.

== See also ==
- Amoeba Music
- Caffe Mediterraneum
- Cathedral Building
- Cody's Books
- daliel's Bookstore
- First African Methodist Episcopal Church (Oakland, California)
- Gutter punk
- Oaksterdam
- Southside, Berkeley, California
- Uptown Oakland
