= Interstate 35W =

Interstate 35W may refer to:

- Interstate 35W (Texas), an 85-mile (137 km) Interstate highway serving Fort Worth, Texas, and its suburbs
- Interstate 35W (Minnesota), a 42-mile (68 km) Interstate highway serving Minneapolis, Minnesota, and its suburbs
  - The old I-35W Mississippi River bridge in Minneapolis, which collapsed on August 1, 2007
  - The new I-35W Saint Anthony Falls Bridge, its replacement
- Interstate 135 in Kansas, which was designated as Interstate 35W until 1976

== See also ==
- Interstate 35E
