= California State Route 24 =

Highway in California

State Route 24
- SR 24 highlighted in red

Route information
- Maintained by Caltrans
- Length: 13.492 mi (21.713 km)
- Existed: 1934–present
- Tourist routes: SR 24 between the Caldecott Tunnel and Walnut Creek
- Restrictions: Trucks carrying hazardous material are only permitted through the Caldecott Tunnel between 3:00 a.m. and 5:00 a.m.

Major junctions
- West end: I-580 / I-980 in Oakland
- SR 13 in Oakland
- East end: I-680 in Walnut Creek

Location
- Country: United States
- State: California
- Counties: Alameda, Contra Costa

Highway system
- State highways in California; Interstate; US; State; Scenic; History; Pre‑1964; Unconstructed; Deleted; Freeways
← SR 23	→ SR 25

State Route 24 (SR 24) is a east–west state highway in the U.S. state of California that serves the eastern side of the San Francisco Bay Area. A freeway throughout its entire length, it runs from the Interstate 580/Interstate 980 interchange (just east of the MacArthur Maze) in Oakland, and through the Caldecott Tunnel under the Berkeley Hills, to the Interstate 680 junction in Walnut Creek. It lies in Alameda County, where it is highly urban, and Contra Costa County, where it passes through wooded hillsides and suburbs. SR 24 is a major connection between the San Francisco–Oakland Bay Bridge/MacArthur Maze complex and the inland cities of the East Bay.

== Route description ==
Route 24 is defined in section 324 of the California Streets and Highways Code:

Route 24 is from:
(a) Route 580 in Oakland to Route 680 in Walnut Creek.
(b) Route 680 in Walnut Creek to Route 4 near Pittsburg.

Route 24 is not fully constructed to extend east to near Pittsburg as it is defined. Possible routes are Willow Pass Road and Ygnacio Valley Road.

SR 24 begins at the four-level stack interchange with Interstate 580 and Interstate 980 in Oakland; this interchange is located on top of Grove Shafter Park. SR 24 initially heads north before turning east near the Berkeley city limits. Route 24 rises from near sea level in downtown Oakland past its interchange with State Route 13, which is a freeway south of SR 24 (upgraded August 1999) and a surface street north of SR 24. After this, SR 24 crosses the Contra Costa County county line through the four-bore Caldecott Tunnel and offers some attractive views of the hilly terrain through which it passes. Some protection of the views comes from the highway's designation as a California Scenic Highway.

On the other side of the tunnel, SR 24 travels through unincorporated Contra Costa County before entering Orinda. SR 24 crosses the Mokelumne Aqueduct soon after entering the city of Lafayette. SR 24 terminates at the intersection with Interstate 680 just inside the city limits of Walnut Creek.

The Yellow Line of the Bay Area Rapid Transit (BART) system runs in the freeway's center median, excepting the vicinity of the Caldecott Tunnel and the approach to the interchange with Interstate 680.

SR 24 is part of the California Freeway and Expressway System, and is part of the National Highway System, a network of highways that are considered essential to the country's economy, defense, and mobility by the Federal Highway Administration. SR 24 is eligible to be included in the State Scenic Highway System; however, Caltrans has only designated it as a scenic highway between the eastern end of the Caldecott Tunnel and I-680, meaning that it is a substantial section of highway passing through a "memorable landscape" with no "visual intrusions", where the potential designation has gained popular favor with the community. SR 24 is designated as both the Grove–Shafter Freeway, after streets the route travels along (Grove Street was later renamed Martin Luther King Jr. Way), and the William Byron Rumford Freeway, honoring the first African American elected to a state public office in Northern California, from the Caldecott Tunnel to the I-580 interchange segment of the MacArthur Maze, continuing henceforth as I-980 to the terminus with I-880.

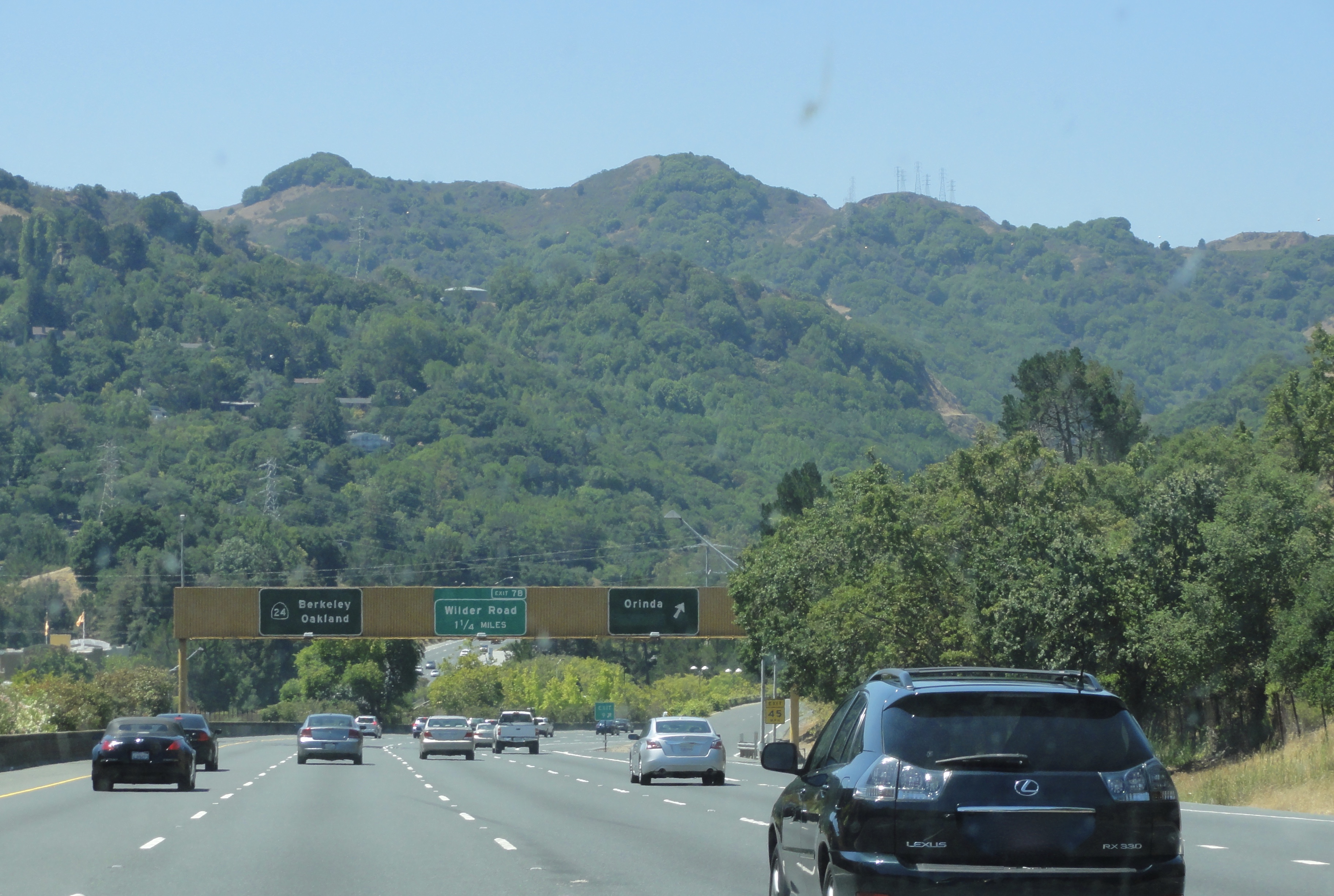
The Berkeley Hills as seen from CA 24 near Orinda.

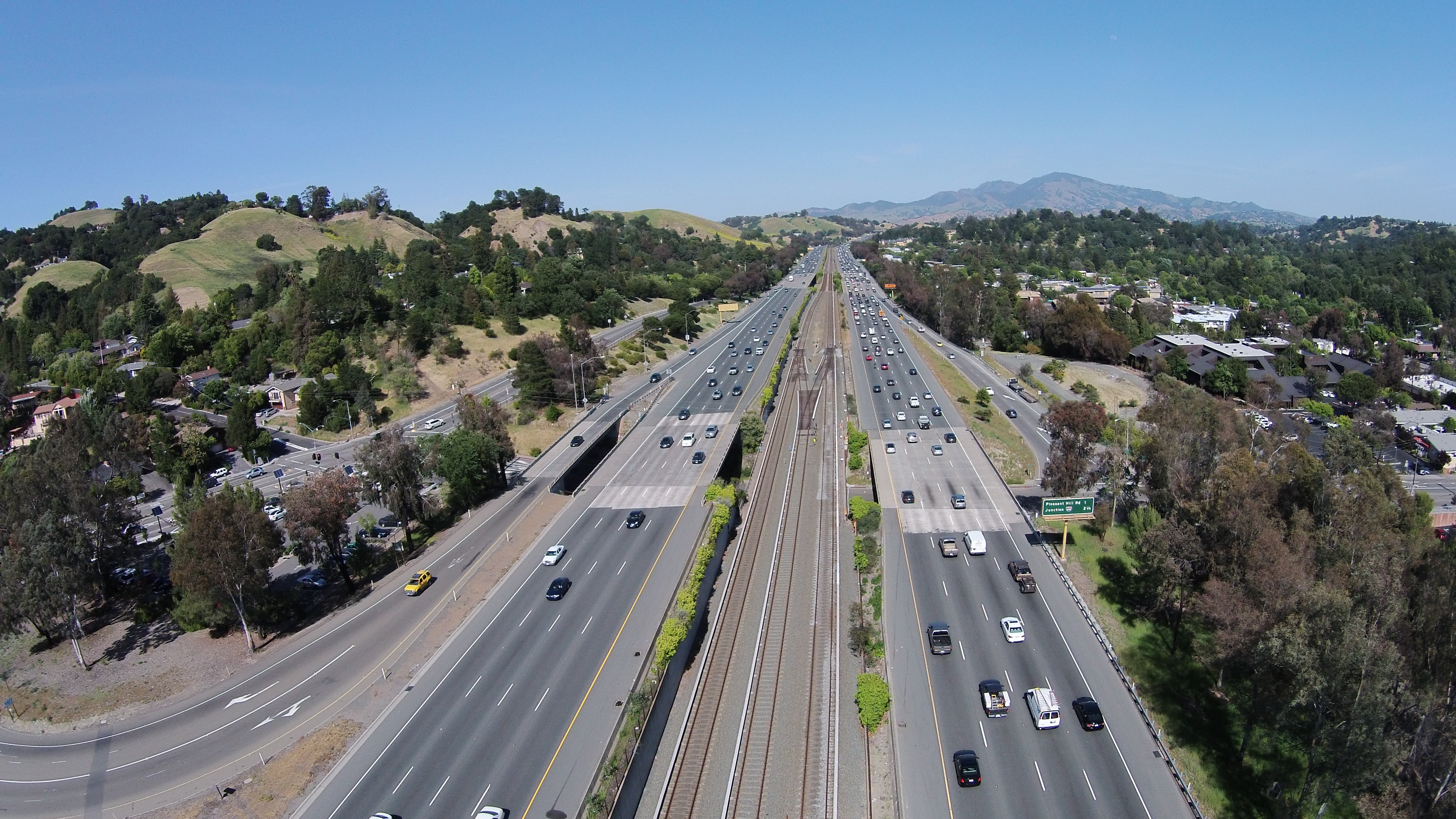
SR 24 near Lafayette, straddling BART tracks with Mt Diablo in the background.

== History ==
Highway 24 was designated in 1932 in conjunction with the ongoing construction of the Broadway Low Level Tunnel (renamed the Caldecott Tunnel in 1960) which opened in 1937, connecting with the new Eastshore Highway and the approaches to the new Bay Bridge by way of Tunnel Road and Ashby Avenue through Berkeley west of the Berkeley Hills, and routed along Mount Diablo Boulevard through Contra Costa County east of the hills. Before either the bridge or the tunnel were completed, Highway 24 was provisionally routed starting from downtown Oakland at the major intersection of San Pablo and Broadway, which was also the terminal point of US 40 and State Highway 17. From this point, Highway 24 proceeded northward along Broadway to College Avenue, then along College to Claremont Avenue, up Claremont to Tunnel Road, then up into the Berkeley Hills on Tunnel Road to the old Intercounty Tunnel (also called the Kennedy Tunnel), through the tunnel into Contra Costa County.

Highway 24 remained along Ashby Avenue until the completion of the Grove–Shafter Freeway in the late 1960s. This new freeway, which originally ran from the Caldecott Tunnel to the MacArthur Freeway and 27th Street in downtown Oakland, was designated Route 24; Ashby was then re-designated Route 13. The Grove–Shafter Freeway was intended to extend further west to the Nimitz Freeway and a proposed Southern Crossing. To help secure additional federal Interstate Highway funding to complete the project, the segment of Highway 24 between the MacArthur and Nimitz Freeways was re-designated as Interstate 980. Exit numbers assigned at Highway 24 start at 2 instead of 1 or 0, treating both I-980 and Highway 24 as one continuous route.

Route 24 used to extend much further east. The section of Interstate 680 between the current terminus of SR 24 and State Route 242 was dual-signed I-680 and SR 24 until c. 1987; State Route 242 which runs primarily in Concord was signed as Route 24 until the same time. Older maps show routes for 24 which continue along State Route 4 from the current intersection of 242 to the Antioch Bridge, continuing along the river road to Sacramento, currently State Route 160, then continuing north to Woodland, Marysville, Oroville, along the North Fork of the Feather River to a junction with State Route 89 (this segment is currently State Route 70), where it continued dual-numbered with 89 through Quincy. Highway 24 split from 89 near Graeagle, and continued east through Portola east until its terminus at U.S. Route 395. Parts of the same route were also sometimes designated as State Route 84.

At least one published map from the 1960s incorrectly showed Route 24 extending eastward from Interstate 680 in Walnut Creek to Route 4 in Pittsburg that followed the Ygnacio Valley Road-Kirker Pass Road-Railroad Avenue corridor, presumably as a future extension that never materialized. A 1970 State Highway Map shows this corridor as a future Route 24 bypass.

A 1956 version of Thomas Brothers maps shows Mount Diablo Boulevard where present day Northgate Road is and labeled as Route 24, winding and climbing the mountain.

== Exit list ==
Under the official exit list by Caltrans, mileage is measured from SR 24's original western terminus, now part of Interstate 980.

County	Location	mi	km	Exit	Destinations	Notes
Alameda	Oakland	2.35	3.78	2A	I-980 west to I-880 – Downtown Oakland	West end of SR 24; exit ramp to I-580 west provides direct access to Market Street / San Pablo Avenue (SR 123); I-580 east exit 19B, west exit 19C; freeway continues west on I-980
Alameda	Oakland	2.35	3.78	2B	I-580 (MacArthur Freeway) – San Francisco, Hayward	West end of SR 24; exit ramp to I-580 west provides direct access to Market Street / San Pablo Avenue (SR 123); I-580 east exit 19B, west exit 19C; freeway continues west on I-980
Alameda	Oakland	2.35	3.78	2	Martin Luther King Jr. Way, 51st Street	Eastbound exit and westbound entrance; Martin Luther King Jr. Way was formerly Grove Street
Alameda	Oakland	3.06	4.92	3	Telegraph Avenue	Westbound exit and eastbound entrance
Alameda	Oakland	3.06	4.92	3	Claremont Avenue	Eastbound exit and westbound entrance
Alameda	Oakland	4.15	6.68	4A	College Avenue	Westbound exit only
Alameda	Oakland	4.15	6.68	4B	Broadway to SR 13 north	Signed as exit 4 eastbound
Alameda	Oakland	5.12	8.24	5A	SR 13 south (Warren Freeway) – Hayward	Signed as exit 5 eastbound; SR 13 north exits 5B-C
Alameda	Oakland	5.12	8.24	5B	SR 13 north (Tunnel Road) – Berkeley	Westbound exit only; eastbound access is via exit 4
Alameda	Oakland	5.65	9.09	6	Tunnel Road, Caldecott Lane	Formerly signed Old Tunnel Road eastbound
Berkeley Hills		6.24	10.04	Caldecott Tunnel		
Contra Costa		6.64	10.69	7A	Fish Ranch Road	
Contra Costa	Orinda	7.39	11.89	7B	Wilder Road	Formerly Gateway Boulevard
Contra Costa	Orinda	8.50	13.68	9	Orinda, Moraga (Camino Pablo)	Moraga not signed westbound; formerly signed with Richmond westbound
Contra Costa	Orinda	9.66	15.55	10	St. Stephens Drive, Hidden Valley Road	
Contra Costa	Lafayette	10.59	17.04	11	Acalanes Road, Mount Diablo Boulevard, Upper Happy Valley Road	Upper Happy Valley Road not signed eastbound; Mount Diablo Boulevard not signed westbound
Contra Costa	Lafayette	12.46	20.05	12	Oak Hill Road – Central Lafayette	Eastbound signage
Contra Costa	Lafayette	12.46	20.05	13	Central Lafayette, Moraga (First Street)	Westbound signage
Contra Costa	Lafayette	13.85	22.29	14	Pleasant Hill Road, Mount Diablo Boulevard	Mount Diablo Boulevard not signed eastbound
Contra Costa	Walnut Creek	15.33	24.67	15A	I-680 north / Ygnacio Valley Road – Sacramento, Concord	East end of SR 24; I-680 north exit 46A, south exit 46
Contra Costa	Walnut Creek	15.33	24.67	15B	I-680 south / Mount Diablo Boulevard – San Jose, Dublin	East end of SR 24; I-680 north exit 46A, south exit 46
1.000 mi = 1.609 km; 1.000 km = 0.621 mi: Incomplete access
