= Interstate 35E =

Interstate 35E may refer to:

- Interstate 35E (Texas), a 97-mile (156 km) long branch route serving Dallas, Texas
- Interstate 35E (Minnesota), a 41-mile (66 km) long branch route serving St. Paul, Minnesota

== See also ==
- Interstate 35W (disambiguation)
