= California State Route 13 =

State highway in Alameda County, California, United States

State Route 13
- SR 13 highlighted in red

Route information
- Maintained by Caltrans
- Length: 9.73 mi (15.66 km)
- Existed: 1964 renumbering–present

Major junctions
- South end: I-580 in Oakland
- SR 24 in Oakland; SR 123 in Berkeley
- North end: I-80 / I-580 in Berkeley

Location
- Country: United States
- State: California
- Counties: Alameda

Highway system
- State highways in California; Interstate; US; State; Scenic; History; Pre‑1964; Unconstructed; Deleted; Freeways
← SR 12	→ SR 14

State Route 13 (SR 13) is a state highway in the U.S. state of California. It runs entirely in Alameda County, connecting Interstate 580 in Oakland to Interstate 80/Interstate 580 in Berkeley.

It consists of three contiguous segments: the Warren Freeway from I-580 to State Route 24 in Oakland; Tunnel Road, a narrow two-lane road to Claremont Avenue in Berkeley; and Ashby Avenue, a main east–west street through south Berkeley to I-80/I-580.

== Route description ==
Route 13 is defined in section 313 of the California Streets and Highways Code, and that the highway is "from Route 61 near the Oakland International Airport to Route 61 near Emeryville via the vicinity of Lake Temescal". Route 13 was never fully constructed as it is defined, as was Route 61.

SR 13 currently begins at Interstate 580 near Mills College in East Oakland and continues north as the Warren Freeway, named after former Alameda County District Attorney, California Governor and U.S. Supreme Court Chief Justice Earl Warren. The four-lane freeway takes a largely straight path as it runs through a scenic valley. This valley is enclosed by the far eastern hills of Oakland and a shutter ridge that has been driven northwestward along the Hayward Fault, and the entire freeway lies within the earthquake fault zone of the Hayward Fault. In the event of a major earthquake on the fault, this section of SR 13 may sustain heavy damage. Numerous overpasses have recently undergone extensive seismic retrofitting.

The tall trees on the highway's side make the highway appear narrower, and until late 2004, a dense group of trees also lined most of the highway's median. For most of the day, the freeway experiences only modest traffic, which makes it a speedy bypass around downtown Oakland. Much of the traffic on this highway comes from SR 24's commute hour congestion backing up onto SR 13 northbound via the exchange between the highways.

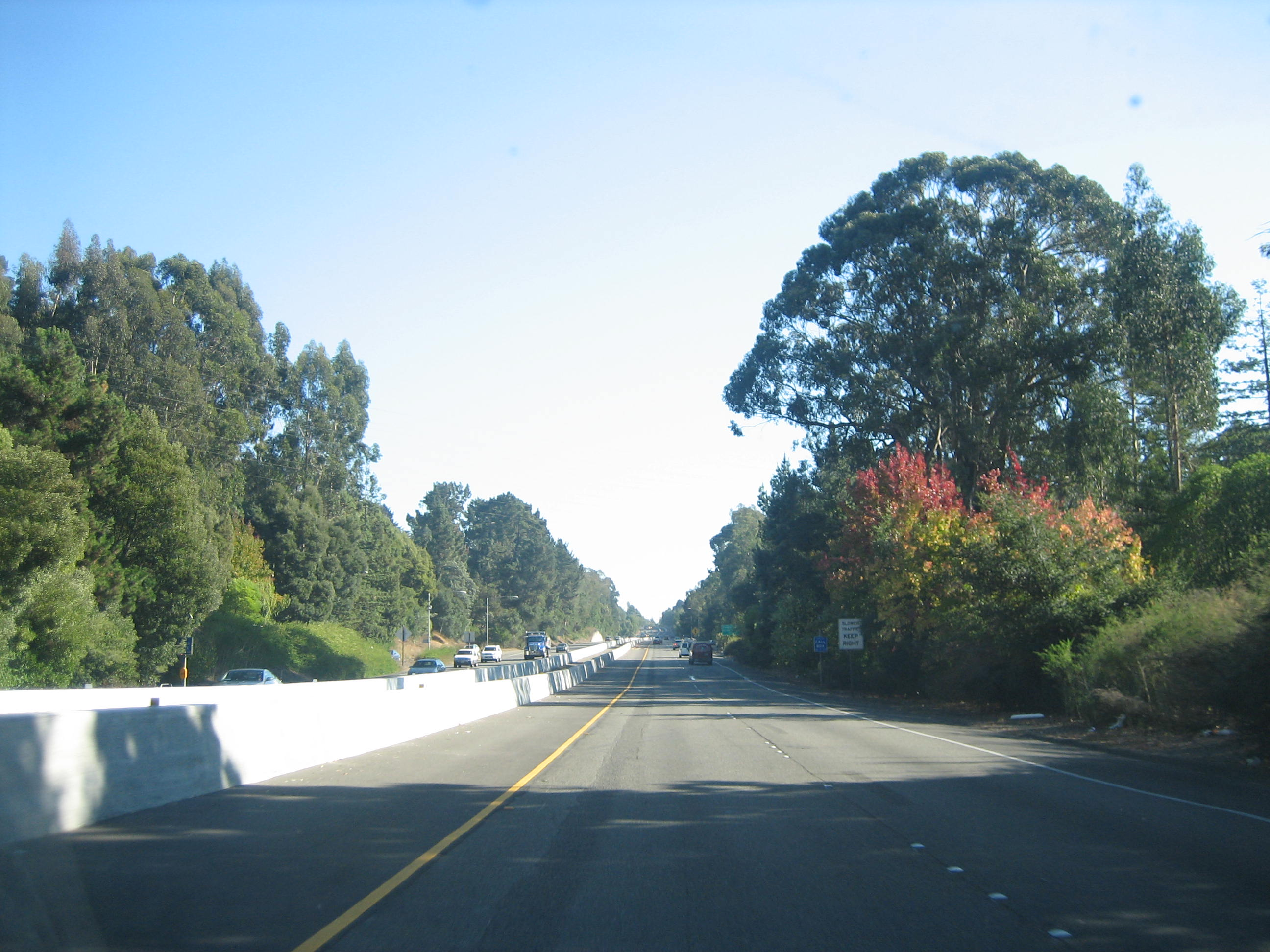
The Warren Freeway portion of State Route 13 between Joaquin Miller Road and Redwood Road.

After going through an interchange with State Route 24 (upgraded August 1999) near the entrance to the Caldecott Tunnel, however, SR 13 takes drastic changes in its quality and capacity. The freeway ends at an uphill junction and the route is defaulted onto Tunnel Road, a much more narrow two-lane road that bends to the west and winds downhill. Upon reaching the foot of the hill, Tunnel Road becomes Ashby Avenue, a markedly urban (and very busy) two-lane street with an east–west routing. Entering Berkeley, UC Berkeley is north on Telegraph Avenue, while Ashby BART station is located at Adeline Street. Past San Pablo Avenue (SR 123), Route 13 (as Ashby Avenue) runs through a more modest neighborhood before reaching its current end at Interstate 80/Interstate 580.

SR 13 is part of the California Freeway and Expressway System, and is part of the National Highway System, a network of highways that are considered essential to the country's economy, defense, and mobility by the Federal Highway Administration. SR 13 is known as the Warren Freeway from Route 24 to Route 580, as named by Assembly Concurrent Resolution 96, Chapter 166 in 1957.

== History ==
The 1934 version of SR 13 corresponded to present-day SR 17 and Interstate 880, described as "Santa Cruz to ... San Rafael, via San Jose, Mt. Eden, and Oakland."

The present-day SR 13 was created to accommodate the construction of the Grove-Shafter Freeway, now designated State Route 24. Before the construction of the Grove-Shafter, Ashby Avenue was State Route 24, while the balance of the route of today's Warren Freeway was not a designated state highway. The main thoroughfare through the Montclair District in those days was Mountain Boulevard.

State Route 13 was formed in 1947, from SR 24 to then-US 50 via Warren Boulevard. In the 1964 state highway renumbering, it extended north to I-80 over part of SR 24, and was rerouted on its current routing. Before its designation, it was known as several different legislative route numbers, including 258 from Interstate 580 to present-day SR 61, and 227 from Warren Boulevard to U.S. Route 50. This latter segment was not finished in 1963 and only existed from SR 24 to Joaquin Miller Road. However, the finished portion along Warren Boulevard was commissioned as part of the state highway system in 1947.

The portion of SR 13 between SR 24 and I-80 was known as Sign Route 24; however, it was legislatively designated as Route 206 since 1935. The portion between I-80 and SR 61 was also part of Legislative Route 206 and was commissioned into the state highway system in 1959.

Route 13 was to have been a freeway bypass of Oakland and Berkeley and would have extended south from its present end to the Nimitz Freeway (Route 880). State law describes an even longer Route 13, which would start further south at Route 61 and end at an unconstructed part of Route 61 west of Emeryville. The latter end would require an interchange over water. However, local resistance to further freeway construction in Oakland prevented the extension. Similar resistance in Berkeley has kept Route 13 from being built as a freeway north of Route 24, hence its role as a surface street.

In August 2004, Caltrans began replacing the median's original metal guardrails with a new wall along the 3.5-mile (5.6 km) stretch of SR 13 between SR 24 and I-580. This allowed road crews to drive street-sweeping vehicles along the shoulders throughout the week, rather than sending people to pick up trash by hand. However, residents frequenting SR 13 have said that the median appears to be filled with fewer trees and bushes than prior to Caltrans construction. These trees once densely lining the median have long supplemented the lush vegetation on both sides of the highway to beautify this scenic route.

== Major intersections ==
Except where prefixed with a letter, postmiles were measured on the road as it was in 1964, based on the alignment that existed at the time, and do not necessarily reflect current mileage. Postmile prefixes include: R reflecting a realignment in the route since then, M indicating a second realignment, L referring to an overlap due to a correction or change, and T indicating postmiles classified as temporary. Segments that remain unconstructed or have been relinquished to local control may be omitted. The entire route is in Alameda County.

Location	Postmile	Exit	Destinations	Notes
Oakland	4.26	1A	I-580 east (MacArthur Freeway) – Hayward, Stockton	South end of SR 13; I-580 east exit 26, west exit 26A
Oakland	4.26	26 (Note: Exit number follows I-580 rather than SR 13.)	Seminary Avenue	South end of SR 13; I-580 east exit 26, west exit 26A
Oakland	4.26	1B	Mountain Boulevard to I-580 west (MacArthur Freeway) – Downtown Oakland, San Francisco	South end of SR 13; I-580 east exit 26, west exit 26A
Oakland	5.01– 5.39	1C	Carson Street, Redwood Road	Signed as exit 1 northbound
Oakland	6.47	2	Joaquin Miller Road, Lincoln Avenue	
Oakland	7.40	3	Park Boulevard	
Oakland	8.30	4	Moraga Avenue, Thornhill Drive	
Oakland	9.07	5A	Broadway Terrace	Signed as exit 5 southbound
Oakland	R9.62	5B	SR 24 east (Grove-Shafter Freeway) – Walnut Creek, Concord	No southbound exit; SR 24 west exits 5A-B
Oakland	R9.62	5C	SR 24 west (Grove-Shafter Freeway) – Oakland	Northbound left exit and southbound entrance; SR 24 east exits 4-5
Oakland		North end of freeway		
Oakland			Tunnel Road east to SR 24 – Walnut Creek, Downtown Oakland	
Berkeley	11.61		Telegraph Avenue	
Berkeley			Shattuck Avenue	
Berkeley	13.18		SR 123 (San Pablo Avenue) – Albany, Oakland	
Berkeley	13.93		I-80 / I-580 (Eastshore Freeway) – Richmond, Sacramento, San Francisco	Interchange; northbound exit and southbound entrance; north end of SR 13; I-80/I-580 exit 10; I-580 was former SR 17
1.000 mi = 1.609 km; 1.000 km = 0.621 mi: Incomplete access
