= MacArthur Maze =

Freeway interchange in California

- MacArthur Interchange; Distribution Structure
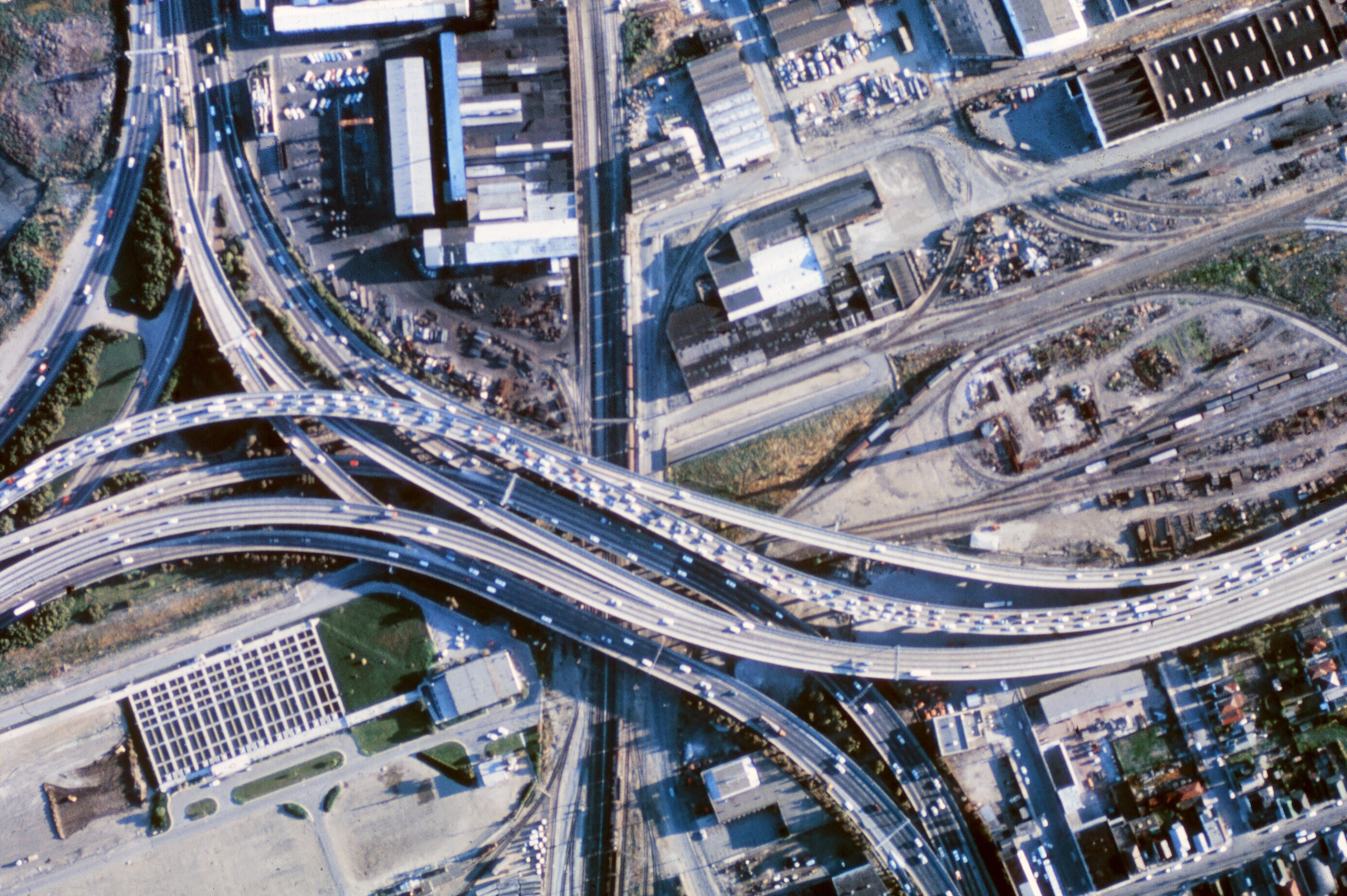
- Aerial view of the MacArthur Maze (early 1970s, before the 1989 Loma Prieta earthquake forced a rebuild). Eastshore Freeway (I-80) is the short curved segment in the upper left corner. MacArthur Freeway (I-580) runs east-west (left-right) through the center of the photograph, crossing the Southern Pacific tracks running north-south. Nimitz Freeway (I-880) (then-signed as SR 17) curves south onto the Cypress Street Viaduct at the bottom.
- Interactive map of MacArthur Maze

Location
- Oakland, California
- Coordinates: 37°49′38″N 122°17′28″W
- Roads at junction: I-80 I-580 I-880

Construction
- Maintained by: Caltrans

The MacArthur Maze (or more simply the Maze; formally, the East Bay Distribution Structure) is a large freeway interchange in Oakland, California. It splits traffic coming off the east end of the San Francisco–Oakland Bay Bridge into three freeways: the Eastshore (I-80/I-580), MacArthur (I-580) and Nimitz (I-880).

== Description ==
San Francisco Bay Area traffic funnels across the few bridges spanning the bay, so the Maze's central location near the east end of the San Francisco–Oakland Bay Bridge makes it a hub for east–west and north–south traffic to and from San Francisco and Oakland. It sits next to the Port of Oakland, the fourth-busiest container port in the United States.

Four freeways intersect at this interchange:

- I-80 west (Bay Bridge)
  Interstate 80 from the Maze heads west onto the Bay Bridge across the bay toward San Francisco, where it joins US 101.
- I-80 east / I-580 west (Eastshore Freeway) – Berkeley, Sacramento, San Rafael
  The Interstate 80/Interstate 580 wrong-way concurrency from the Maze heads north through Berkeley and western Contra Costa County. Just north of the Berkeley-Albany border, about 4 miles (6.4 km) north of the Maze, the concurrency splits. Interstate 80 heads northeast towards Sacramento. Interstate 580 heads northwest towards the Richmond-San Rafael Bridge and eventually to Marin County, where it joins U.S. 101 in San Rafael.
- I-580 east (MacArthur Freeway) to SR 24 / I-980 – Downtown Oakland, Walnut Creek, Hayward, Stockton
  Interstate 580 from the Maze heads southeast through Oakland. A mile southeast is an interchange with State Route 24/Interstate 980, a corridor for commuters from Contra Costa County. I-580 continues southeast along the foot of the hills (and nearly atop the trace of the Hayward Fault) to Castro Valley. I-580 then turns east and continues through the Livermore Valley, over Altamont Pass, and ending up near Tracy, where it terminates at Interstate 5.
- I-880 south (Nimitz Freeway) – San Jose
  Interstate 880 from the Maze heads south and southeast through Oakland along the Oakland Estuary, past the Oakland International Airport, and the Oakland Coliseum, then through southern Alameda County to San Jose where it turns into Highway 17 to Santa Cruz.

Local traffic using the interchange includes East Bay commuters to and from San Francisco via the Bay Bridge, as well as drivers traveling up and down the East Bay. For long-distance traffic accessing other parts of the country, I-80 is the primary Interstate Highway for points east. Although Interstate 5, the main north–south Interstate Highway on the West Coast of the United States, bypasses the Bay Area to the east, connections are provided to the Maze via I-505 and I-80 from the north, and I-580, along with I-205, to the south. Furthermore, drivers on US 101 who want to bypass San Francisco can use I-880 from San Jose to the Maze, and then I-580 across the Richmond-San Rafael Bridge.

Despite the interchange's size, it does not permit complete freedom of movement. Northbound traffic approaching the Maze on I-880 cannot directly reach I-580 east, nor can drivers on I-580 west turn onto I-880 south.

In at least one instance, the MacArthur Maze has been considered to include or instead refer to the four-level stack interchange completed in 1985 between California State Route 24, Interstate 980, and Interstate 580, about 1 mile (1.6 km) east of the East Bay Distribution Structure. However, CalTrans unequivocally regards "MacArthur Maze" as only referring to the Distribution Structure.

== History ==
Original 1936 configuration

The maze was constructed along with the Bay Bridge in the 1930s; construction of the East Bay Distribution Structure itself started on April 8, 1934. The media and public nicknamed it the "Maze" as early as June 1936. The site, wholly contained within the city of Oakland, was chosen because it was where major approaches to the Bay bridge were to come together and where tracks from the Southern Pacific, Santa Fe, and Key System railroads intersected. It was considered desirable to elevate the highway junction above the rails, thereby avoiding numerous grade crossings. The first configuration was relatively simple: westbound traffic from 38th Street (later MacArthur Boulevard) merged with northbound traffic from Cypress Street and crossed above the Southern Pacific tracks, then split into ramps north to the Eastshore Highway (US 40) and west to the Bay Bridge. A parallel set of ramps handled eastward/southward traffic. Film footage of the early Maze can be seen in the 1941 movie Shadow of the Thin Man, as Nick and Nora Charles drive off the Bay Bridge on their way to Golden Gate Fields in Albany.

In the original 1936 configuration, traffic flows had to weave for about 550 feet (170 m); a third level was completed on October 24, 1955, separating traffic between MacArthur and the Bay Bridge from the north–south traffic between Cypress and the Eastshore Highway. The enlargement to the Maze was consonant with plans already underway to build the double-deck Cypress Viaduct (which was later incorporated into the Nimitz Freeway, then-signed as SR 17 and later as I-880). In addition, MacArthur Boulevard was to be expanded into a freeway (the MacArthur Freeway, I-580). The nickname "MacArthur" Maze originated sometime after the completion of the MacArthur Freeway in the early 1960s.

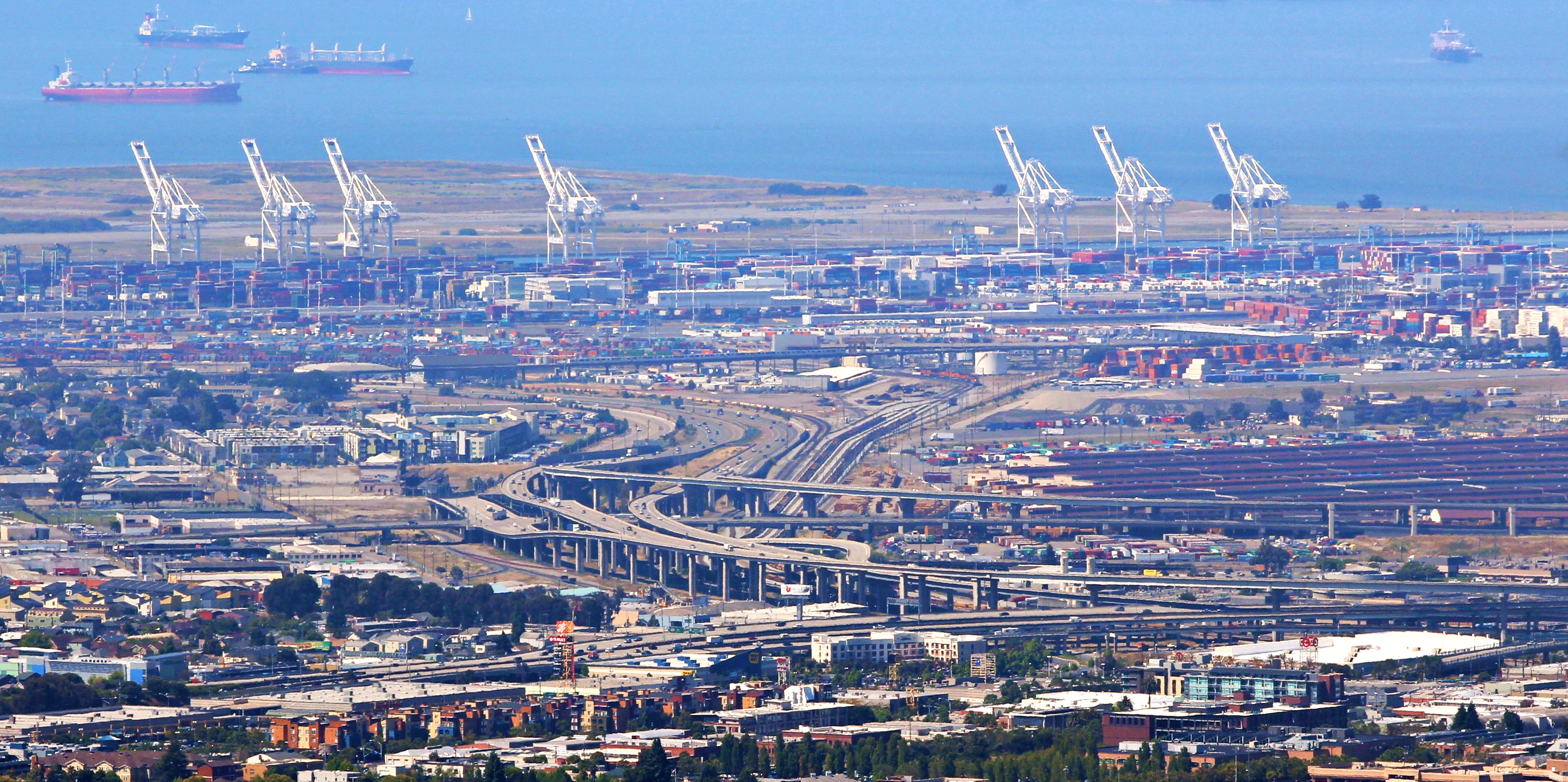
View of the Maze from the Berkeley Hills

Another round of extensive re-engineering followed the 1989 Loma Prieta earthquake, including the addition of diamond lane ramps and a huge girder flyover connecting the relocated northbound Nimitz with the northbound Eastshore Freeway (which is technically I-80 eastbound and I-580 westbound). The original 1936 ramps were removed during this 1990s construction. Reinforcements were completed in 2001–2002.

=== 1989 Loma Prieta earthquake ===
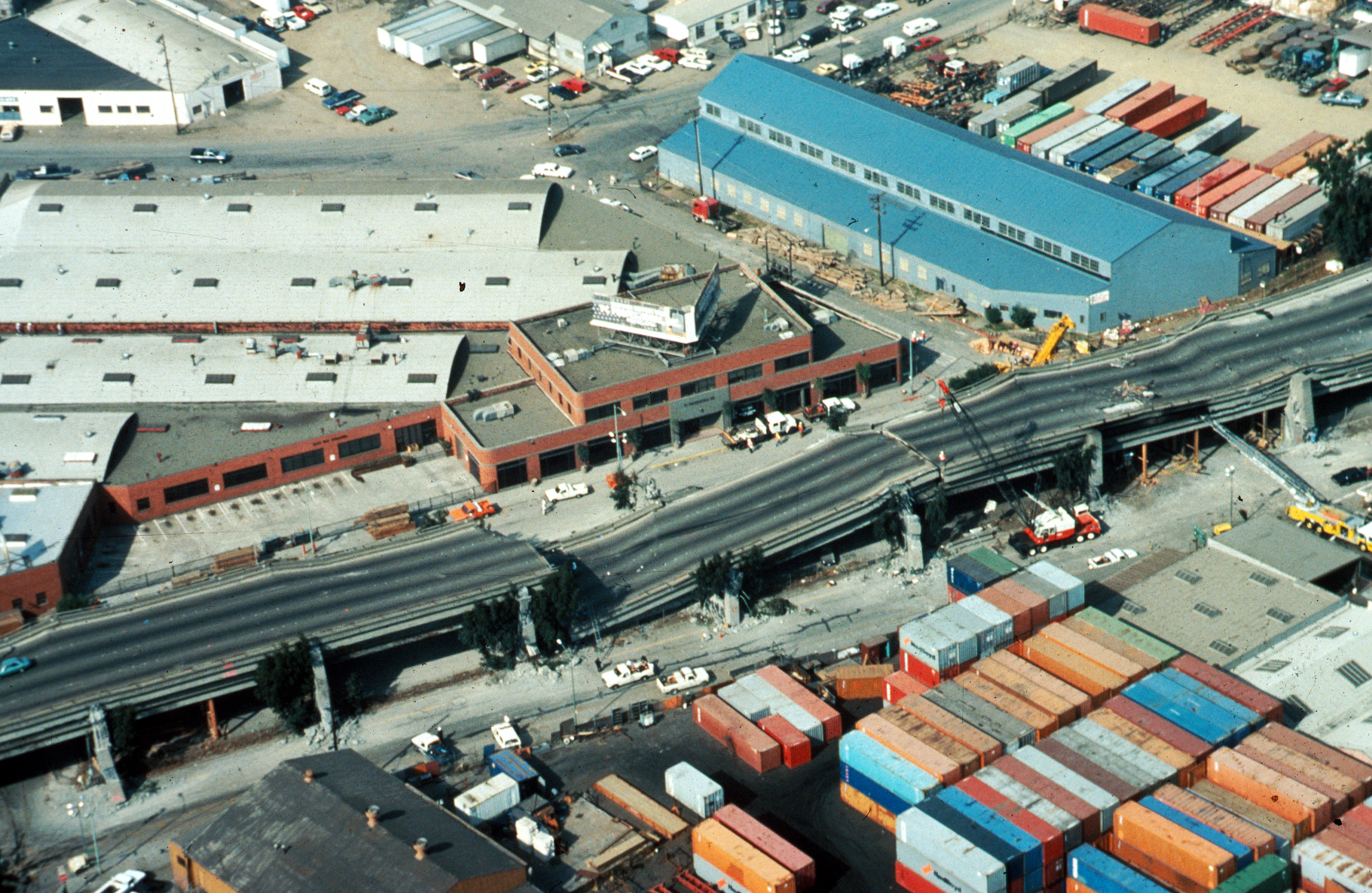
Portion of the collapsed Cypress Viaduct over 32nd Street in Oakland following the Loma Prieta earthquake

During the 6.9 M_{w} Loma Prieta earthquake, the double-decked Cypress Street Viaduct on I-880 between I-80 and the 14th Street exit collapsed, crushing cars and killing 42 people. Traffic on the MacArthur Maze headed towards I-880 was re-routed to I-580 and I-980, and ramps at both ends of the viaduct leading to the former Cypress Structure were temporarily signed for local traffic access to Cypress Street.

The Cypress Street Viaduct was demolished soon after the earthquake, but a replacement freeway wasn't opened until July 1997, due to lawsuits by environmentalists and local residents. A second connection to the Maze, known as the East Bay Viaduct, opened in 1998 but due to safety concerns, as well as ongoing retrofitting on the eastern I-580 connector, the structure was not fully rebuilt until 2001 (though a connection northwest to the Bay Bridge along the alignment of the old Grand Avenue Viaduct was built in 1995). The replacement sections of the Nimitz Freeway dispensed with the double-deck design. It was built near the Union Pacific railway tracks around the outskirts of West Oakland, rather than bisecting that neighborhood as the Cypress Viaduct had. Cypress Street, which ran on each side of the old double-deck highway, is now a landscaped parkway and has been renamed Mandela Parkway. In 2007 Mandela Parkway was linked at its north end with the west end of Yerba Buena Avenue, creating a new through route into Emeryville.

=== 2007 I-580 East Connector collapse ===
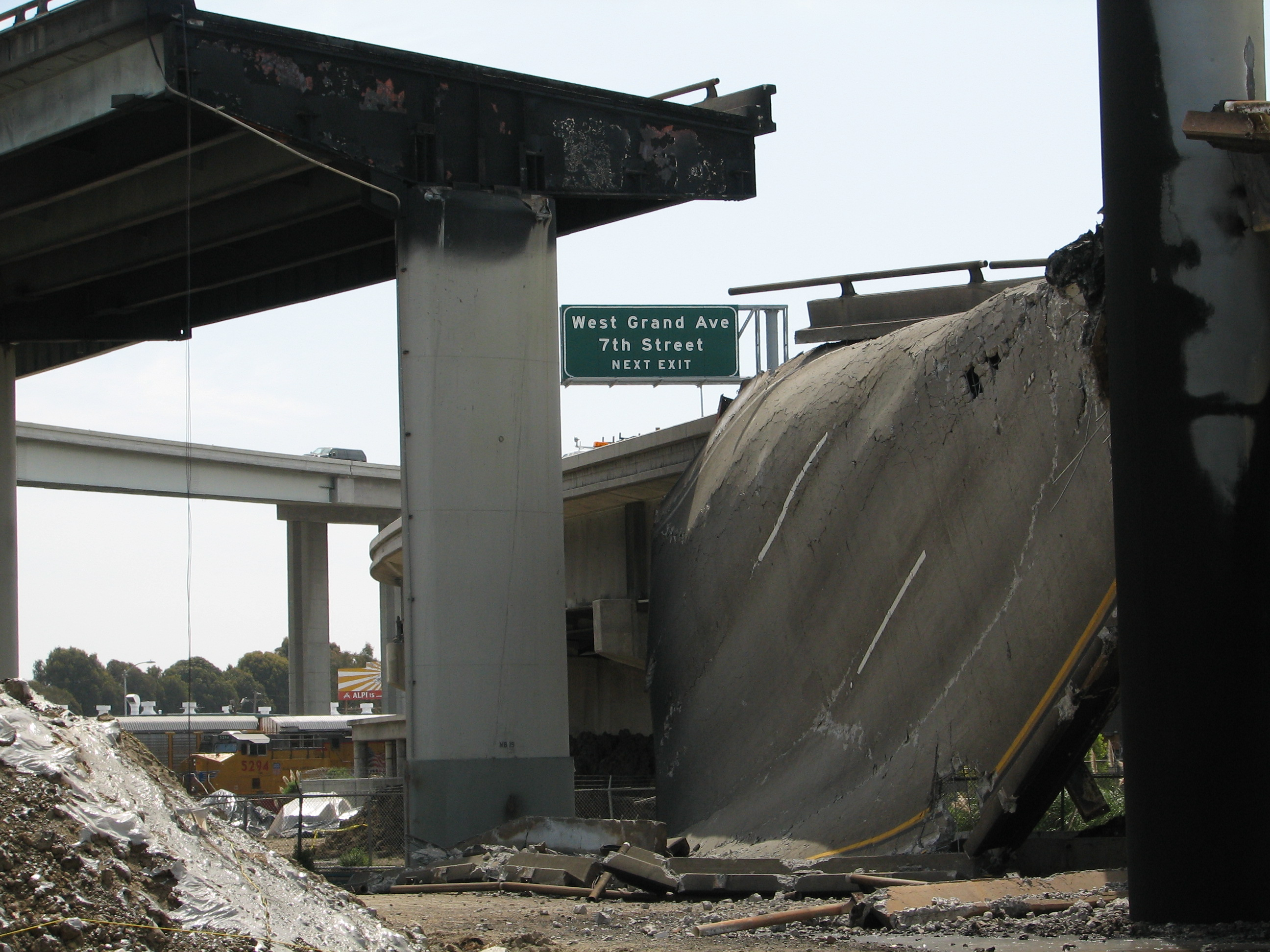
A portion of Interstate 580 following the collapse.

At 3:42 am on Sunday, April 29, 2007, a tank truck carrying 8,600 U.S. gallons (33,000 L) of unleaded gasoline overturned on the connector from Interstate 80 west (from Berkeley) to Interstate 880 south. The intense heat from the subsequent fuel spill and fire weakened the steel structure of the roadway above, which served as the connecting ramp from Interstate 80 east (from San Francisco) to Interstate 580 east (to Oakland), collapsing about 168 feet (51 m) of it onto the lower connector. The truck driver involved suffered second degree burns on his hands but was nonetheless able to walk 1.5 miles (2.4 km) to a gas station, where he found a taxi and was given a ride to Oakland Kaiser Medical Center. No other vehicles or persons were involved in the accident.

The California Highway Patrol (CHP) initially reported that they suspected that the tanker had been speeding and bounced off a guard rail, leading to the overturn. The driver was found to have a clean record the preceding decade; drug or alcohol use was determined not to be a factor in the accident.

The collapse of this bridge cut off the return route from San Francisco for many East Bay commuters (primarily those whose destinations are Walnut Creek and southeastern Oakland). To help ease the expected traffic snarl, Caltrans set up temporary detours within the days following the incident, Bay Area Rapid Transit (BART) added additional capacity to lines serving areas that had been impacted by the incident, and on Monday April 30, all public transportation in the Bay Area was free, with the estimated cost of $2.5 million paid out of state funds. News commentators have pointed out the similarities to the disruption caused by the Loma Prieta earthquake 18 years earlier. While there was some serious congestion on the detour routes, the expected traffic jams and long delays did not fully materialize. This was possibly due to commuters switching to alternate transit options, indicated by BART posting record ridership numbers during that time.

==== Rebuilding ====
Caltrans spokespersons estimated immediately after the accident that it would take weeks to clear the debris from the scene and months to rebuild the affected sections. Initial cost projections for rebuilding the I-580 connector alone reached $10 million. However, due to the urgency to reopen such a vital highway link the project was expedited, and most demolition work and debris removal was completed by the Tuesday following the accident. For a historic comparison, Caltrans did replace a single damaged upper deck panel of the Bay Bridge (after the Loma Prieta earthquake) and the collapsed portion of the I-10 Santa Monica Freeway in Los Angeles (after the Northridge earthquake) in roughly one month by expediting its internal approval process and offering an incentive program for the contractors.

On May 7, 2007, the I-880 connector reopened at 4:30 a.m. to traffic. Substantial work was done to strengthen of the structure, which had sunk 9 inches (230 mm) due to the collapse of the I-580 connector onto the I-880 connector.

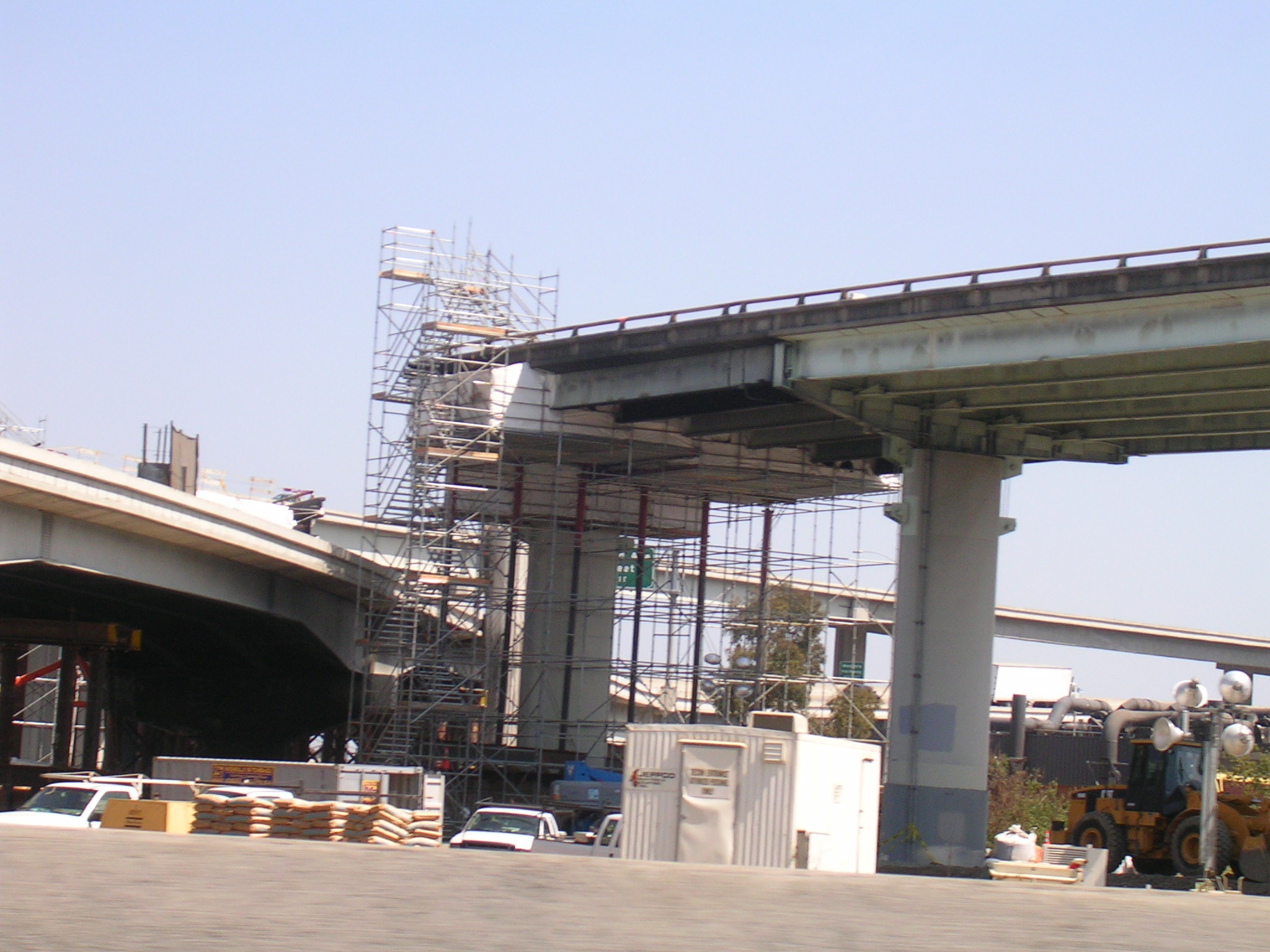
The connector during reconstruction work.

C. C. Myers, Inc., which had completed repairs to the Santa Monica Freeway after the 1994 Northridge earthquake well ahead of schedule, submitted a winning bid of $876,075 to repair the damage to the I-580 connector. The bid was estimated to cover only one-third of the cost of the work, but the firm counted on making up the shortfall with an incentive of $200,000 per day if the work was completed before June 27, 2007.

On the evening of Thursday, May 24, the I-580 connector re-opened, just before the busy Memorial Day weekend. The deadline to finish the project was beaten by over a month, with the contractor earning a $5 million bonus for early completion. The entire reconstruction project was completed only 26 days after the original accident. A state projection concluded that the connector collapse had cost roughly $6 million per day in total economic impact.

On May 25, 2007, the CHP revoked the license for transporting hazardous materials from Sabek Transportation, the owner of the tank truck, after an investigation found 36 violations of its operations and equipment.
