= Interstate 980 =

Interstate highway in California

Interstate 980
- I-980 highlighted in red

Route information
- Maintained by Caltrans
- Length: 2.03 mi (3.27 km)
- Existed: 1976 (FHWA); 1981 (state)–present
- NHS: Entire route

Major junctions
- West end: I-880 in Oakland
- East end: I-580 / SR 24 in Oakland

Location
- Country: United States
- State: California
- Counties: Alameda

Highway system
- Interstate Highway System; Main; Auxiliary; Suffixed; Business; Future; State highways in California; Interstate; US; State; Scenic; History; Pre‑1964; Unconstructed; Deleted; Freeways
← SR 905	→ SR 1

Interstate 980 (I-980) is a short 2.03-mile (3.27 km) auxiliary Interstate Highway entirely within Oakland in Northern California, connecting I-580 and State Route 24 (SR 24) to I-880 near Downtown Oakland. I-980 passes the Oakland Convention Center and near the famous Jack London Square. I-980 is commonly considered the dividing line between Downtown Oakland and West Oakland. The freeway was planned as the eastern approach to the Southern Crossing. The segment between I-880 and 17th Street is officially known as the John B. Williams Freeway, after the former director of the city of Oakland's Office of Community Development. In addition, I-980 and SR 24 in Oakland are both designated as part of the Grove-Shafter Freeway, after streets the route travels along (Grove Street was later renamed Martin Luther King Jr. Way).

I-980 was used as an alternate route between Oakland and San Francisco when the Cypress Viaduct carrying I-880 collapsed in the 1989 Loma Prieta earthquake. Traffic headed from the south would have to use I-980 to I-580 west to I-80 west to get across the San Francisco–Oakland Bay Bridge to reach San Francisco. This ended when I-880 reopened on a new alignment in 1997 (1998 to and from I-80 east).

== Route description ==
The entirety of I-980 is defined in section 624 of the California Streets and Highways Code as Route 980, and that the highway is from "Route 880 to Route 580 in Oakland". This definition roughly corresponds with the Federal Highway Administration (FHWA)'s route logs of I-980.

Although I-980 physically goes north and south, it is signed as an east–west route like SR 24. Immediately after traffic leaves I-880 on elevated connector ramps, I-980 then descends below grade to pass under downtown city streets. The freeway then ascends above grade to pass over SR 123 (San Pablo Avenue) and 27th Street before reaching I-580 and SR 24.

The freeway itself lacks overhead guide signs mentioning I-980. Immediately after exit 1B (SR 123/17th Street) going eastbound on I-980 is a guide sign mentioning the junction with I-580. Likewise, the guide signs on westbound I-980 at exit 1D (18th Street) list I-880 and San Jose as a control city. Since 2018, Jackson Street and I-880 south have been signed as exits 1B and 1A in the westbound direction.

I-980 is part of the California Freeway and Expressway System and is part of the National Highway System, a network of highways that are considered essential to the country's economy, defense, and mobility by the Federal Highway Administration (FHWA).

== History ==
The route known as I-980 was originally added to the state highway system in 1947 as part of Legislative Route 226 (LRN 226) and to the California Freeway and Expressway System in 1959. This segment of LRN 226 became part of SR 24 in the 1964 state highway renumbering.

Construction on a Highway 24 freeway connecting Downtown Oakland with the Caldecott Tunnel in the Oakland Hills began in the 1960s. It was also originally intended to serve the Southern Crossing and a regional shopping mall in Oakland, neither of which were ever built. While the freeway was completed from the tunnel to I-580 and 27th Street, construction of the segment extending it further west to the Nimitz Freeway (present-day I-880) resulted in community opposition due to about 503 homes in the freeway's path (and thus slated to be demolished or moved). In 1972, a federal lawsuit halted its construction until Caltrans agreed to build replacement housing. With city officials still pushing for the freeway's completion, a compromise was also reached to change the design from an elevated freeway to a depressed freeway, decreasing noise.

To help complete the freeway with federal funding, the FHWA approved the addition of the segment to the Interstate Highway System in January 1976, with the Interstate money only used west of SR 123 (San Pablo Avenue).; thus, I-980 is designated as part "chargeable" Interstate and part "non-chargable", 23 U.S.C. § 103(c)(4)(A) Interstate. The segment's number was legislatively changed from Route 24 to I-980 in 1981, and it finally opened in 1985.

== Future ==
The San Francisco Chronicle reported in November 2015 about a grassroots organization of local architects and planners, supported by Oakland mayor Libby Schaaf, that propose to replace I-980 with a landscaped city boulevard. ConnectOakland is coordinating the push for a replacement. In January 2017, I-980 was included in Congress for the New Urbanism "Freeways without Futures" report.

Caltrans and the city of Oakland received a $680,000 Reconnecting Communities planning grant, funded by the 2021 Infrastructure Investment and Jobs Act, to study rebuilding or removing I-980. BART may use the corridor as an approach for a second Transbay Tube.

Arguments for replacement focus on the freeway's low volume of traffic and negative impact on surrounding neighborhoods. Concerns are however raised on whether the existing surface streets can handle the relocated traffic, and whether it may actually increase gentrification in the area.

== Exit list ==
The entire route is in Oakland, Alameda County.

mi	km	Exit	Destinations	Notes
0.01	0.016	1A	I-880 south (Nimitz Freeway) – San Jose	No access to I-880 north; west end of I-980; I-880 north exit 42A; former SRSR 17
0.01	0.016	1B	Jackson Street	Westbound exit only
0.01	0.016	1A	11th Street / 14th Street	Eastbound exit and westbound entrance only
0.01	0.016	1B	17th Street, San Pablo Avenue (to SR 123)	Eastbound exit and westbound entrance only
0.54	0.87	1C	12th Street / 11th Street	Westbound exit and eastbound entrance only
0.90	1.45	1D	18th Street / 14th Street	Westbound exit and eastbound entrance only
0.90	1.45	2A	27th Street / West Grand Avenue	Westbound exit and eastbound entrance only
2.03	3.27	2A	I-580 (MacArthur Freeway) – San Francisco, Hayward	East end of I-980; I-580 east exit 19C, west exit 19D; freeway continues east on SR 24
2.03	3.27	2B	SR 24 east (Grove-Shafter Freeway) – Berkeley, Walnut Creek	East end of I-980; I-580 east exit 19C, west exit 19D; freeway continues east on SR 24
1.000 mi = 1.609 km; 1.000 km = 0.621 mi: Incomplete access
