= Interstate 880 (California) =

Interstate highway in California

Interstate 880
- I-880 highlighted in red

Route information
- Auxiliary route of I-80
- Maintained by Caltrans
- Length: 47.22 mi (75.99 km)
- Existed: 1984–present
- NHS: Entire route

Major junctions
- South end: I-280 / SR 17 in San Jose
- US 101 in San Jose; SR 237 in Milpitas; SR 262 in Fremont; SR 84 in Fremont; SR 92 in Hayward; I-238 in San Leandro; I-980 in Oakland
- North end: I-80 / I-580 in Oakland

Location
- Country: United States
- State: California
- Counties: Santa Clara, Alameda

Highway system
- Interstate Highway System; Main; Auxiliary; Suffixed; Business; Future; State highways in California; Interstate; US; State; Scenic; History; Pre‑1964; Unconstructed; Deleted; Freeways
← I-805	→ SR 905

Interstate 880 (I-880) is a north–south auxiliary Interstate Highway in the San Francisco Bay Area of Northern California. It runs from I-280 and State Route 17 (SR 17) in San Jose to I-80 and I-580 in Oakland, running parallel to the eastern shore of San Francisco Bay. For most of its route, I-880 is officially known as the Nimitz Freeway, after World War II fleet admiral Chester W. Nimitz, who retired to the Bay Area. The northernmost five miles (8.0 km) is also commonly referred to as the Cypress Freeway, after the former alignment of the freeway and its subsequent replacement.

== Route description ==
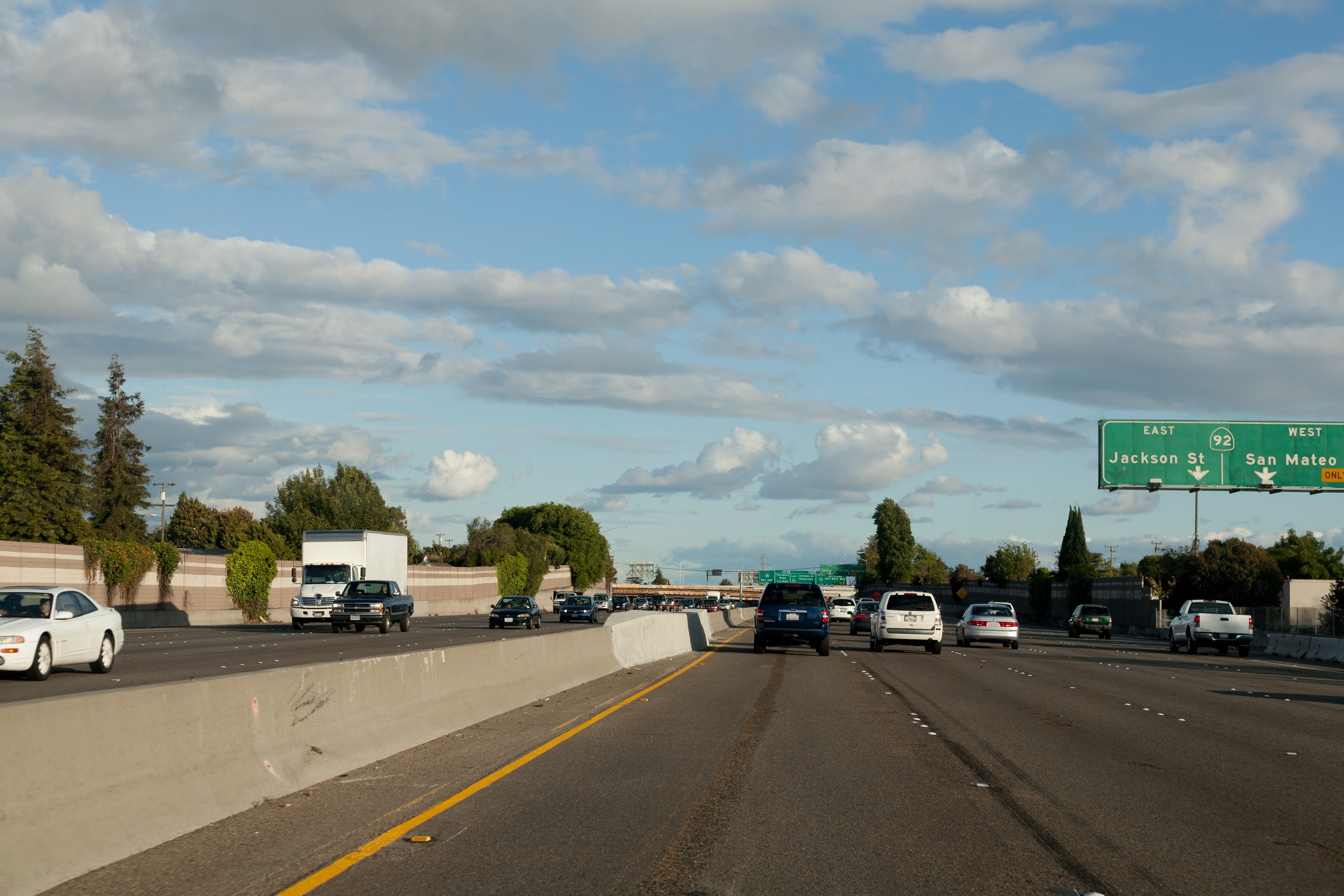
I-880 approaching SR 92 in Hayward

The entirety of I-880 is defined in section 625, subdivision (a) of the California Streets and Highways Code as Route 880, and that the highway is from "Route 280 to Route 80 in Oakland".

In addition, section 325 subdivision (b), last amended by the California State Legislature in 2001, permits the state to relinquish control of the former right-of-way of Route 880 located along the now-demolished Cypress Street Viaduct between 8th and 32nd streets to the City of Oakland. The entirety of I-880 is considered a "non-chargeable" Interstate Highway (built without federal Interstate completion funds per 23 U.S.C. § 103(c)(4)(A)) according to the Federal Highway Administration (FHWA)'s route logs.

The southern terminus of I-880 is at its interchange with I-280 and SR 17 in San Jose. From there, it heads roughly northeast past San Jose International Airport to US Route 101 (US 101). The Nimitz Freeway then turns northwest, running parallel to the southeastern shore of San Francisco Bay, connecting the cities of Milpitas, Fremont, Newark, Union City, Hayward, and San Leandro before reaching Oakland. In Oakland, I-880 passes by Oakland International Airport, Oakland Coliseum, the Port of Oakland, and Downtown Oakland. The northern terminus of I-880 is in Oakland at the junction with I-80 and I-580 (known as the MacArthur Maze), near the eastern approach of the San Francisco–Oakland Bay Bridge.

I-880 between I-238 in San Leandro and the MacArthur Maze is used as the main truck route; trucks over 4.5 short tons (4.1 t; 4.0 long tons) are prohibited through Oakland on I-580.

I-880 is part of the California Freeway and Expressway System and is part of the National Highway System, a network of highways that are considered essential to the country's economy, defense, and mobility by the Federal Highway Administration (FHWA). Officially, the Nimitz Freeway designation is Route 880 from Route 101 to Route 80, as named by Senate Concurrent Resolution 23, Chapter 84 in 1958.

=== Express lanes ===
High-occupancy toll (HOT) lanes along I-880 between the Milpitas–Fremont line at Dixon Landing Road and Lewelling Boulevard in San Lorenzo opened in October 2020. The southbound express lanes extend north to Hegenberger Road in Oakland and south to SR 237 in Milpitas.

As of January 2026, the HOT lanes' hours of operation is weekdays between 5:00 am and 8:00 pm; they are otherwise free and open to all vehicles at other times. Solo drivers are tolled using a congestion pricing system based on the real-time levels of traffic. Two-person carpools are charged 50 percent of the posted toll. Carpools with three or more people and motorcycles are not charged. All tolls are collected using an open road tolling system, and therefore there are no toll booths to receive cash. Each vehicle using the HOT lanes is required to carry a FasTrak Flex transponder with its switch set to indicate the number of the vehicle's occupants (1, 2, or 3+). Solo drivers may also use the FasTrak standard tag without the switch. Drivers without any FasTrak tag will be assessed a toll violation regardless of whether they qualified for free.

== History ==
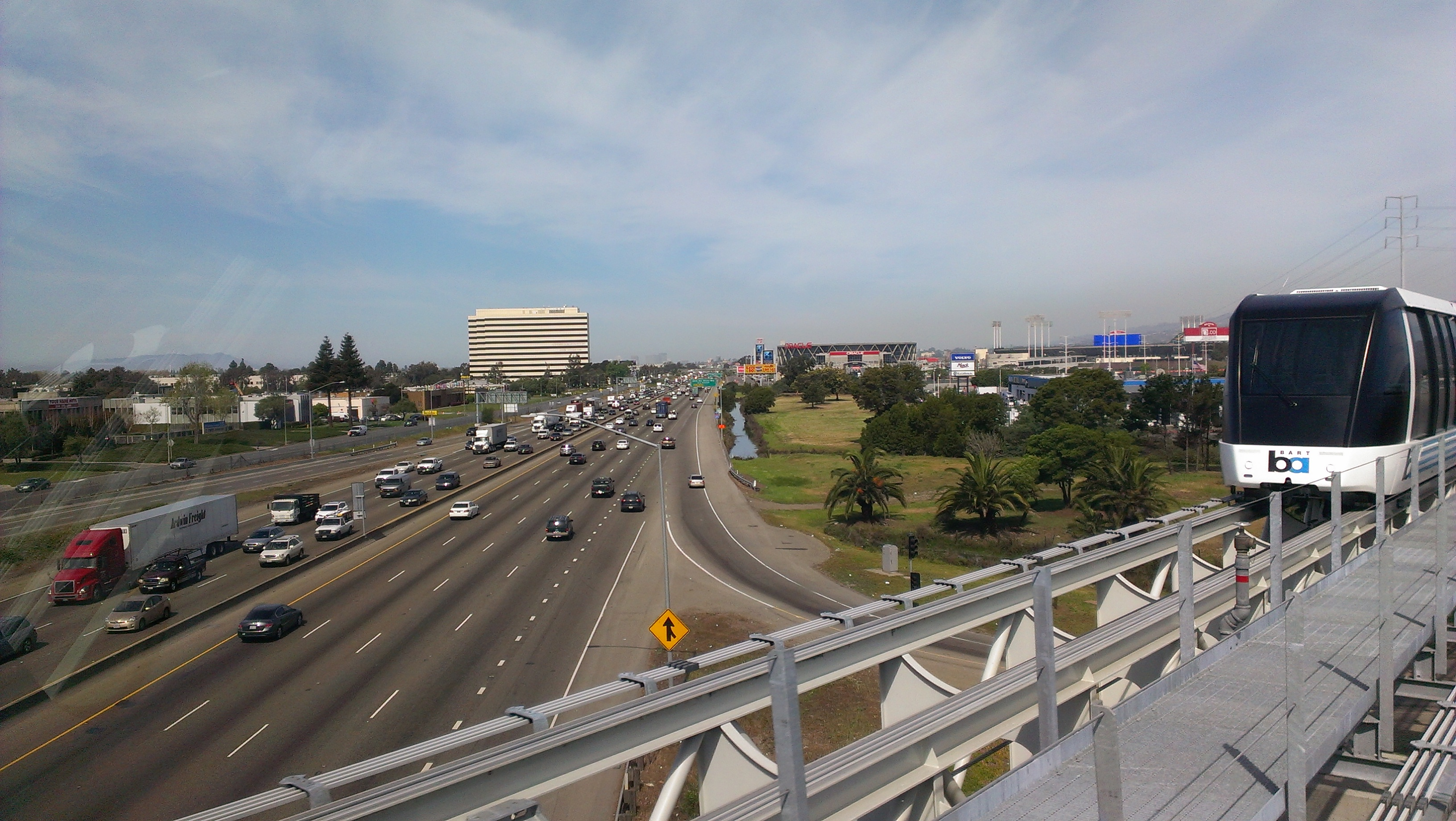
The Oakland Airport Connector traverses I-880 in Oakland, with Oakland Coliseum and Arena right of center

The state legislature added the proposed San Jose–Richmond East Shore Highway to the state highway system in 1933, and it became an extension of the previously short (San Rafael to the bay) Legislative Route (LRN) 69, and part of Sign Route 13 (soon changed to 17) in 1934. From San Jose, this route temporarily followed existing LRN 5 (present Oakland Road, Main Street, Milpitas Boulevard, and Warm Springs Boulevard) to SR 21 at Warm Springs and then continued along existing county roads and city streets, now known as Fremont Boulevard, Alvarado Boulevard, Hesperian Boulevard, Lewelling Boulevard, Washington Avenue, 14th Street, 44th Avenue, 12th Street, 14th Avenue, 8th Street, and 7th Street, into Downtown Oakland. It then turned north at Cypress Street (now Mandela Parkway), passing through the MacArthur Maze and following a newly constructed alignment (signed as US 40) to El Cerrito.

The first short piece of the new Eastshore Freeway opened to traffic on July 22, 1949, connecting Oak Street downtown with 23rd Avenue. It was extended to 98th Avenue on June 1, 1950, Lewelling Boulevard on June 13, 1952, and Jackson Street (SR 92) on June 5, 1953. At the San Jose end, the overlap with Route 5 between Bayshore Highway (US 101) and Warm Springs was bypassed on July 2, 1954. Within Oakland, the double-decker Cypress Street Viaduct opened on June 11, 1957, connecting the freeway with the San Francisco–Oakland Bay Bridge. The Oakland segment was extended south to Fremont Boulevard at Beard Road on November 14, 1957, and the gap was filled on November 24, 1958, soon after the state legislature named the highway after Fleet Admiral Chester W. Nimitz. (The short spur to Route 5 at Warm Springs (now SR 262) remained in the state highway system as a branch of Route 69.) As these sections opened, Sign Route 17 (and LRN 69) was moved from its old surface routing, which mostly became local streets. Other than Route 5 south of Warm Springs, the portion from San Leandro into Oakland was also kept as part of Route 105 (now SR 185).

=== Historic alignments ===
==== SR 17 ====
U.S. Route 48
- Location: French Camp–San Jose from 1926–1929; Lathrop–Hayward from 1929–1931
- Existed: 1926–1931

U.S. Route 101E
- Location: San Rafael–San Jose
- Existed: 1929–1946

State Route 17
- Location: San Rafael–Santa Cruz
- Existed: 1940s–1984 north of I-280

Prior to 1984, the route known as I-880 used to be part of SR 17, which was US 48 from current I-238 to US 101 from 1926 to 1931, then US 101E from 1929 to the mid-1930s. SR 17 used to run from Santa Cruz all the way through San Jose, Oakland, and then continued north via the Eastshore Freeway (I-80) through Richmond to the Richmond–San Rafael Bridge and San Rafael.

In 1984, the segment of SR 17 from I-280 in San Jose to the MacArthur Maze in Oakland was renumbered as I-880, and the portion of SR 17 from the MacArthur Maze to San Rafael was renumbered as part of I-580.

==== Nimitz Freeway ====
In 1947, construction commenced on a freeway to replace the street routing of SR 17 through the East Bay. The new freeway was named the "Eastshore Freeway", and, with the subsequent addition of a freeway to replace the Eastshore Highway north of the MacArthur Maze in the mid 1950s, it ran, appropriately, almost the entire length of the east shore of San Francisco Bay. In 1958, following a joint resolution of the California State Legislature, the portion south of the MacArthur Maze was renamed the Nimitz Freeway in honor of WWII Admiral Nimitz, while the portion to the north retained the name Eastshore Freeway. The formal dedication, with the participation of Admiral Nimitz, took place on August 12, 1958.

==== Historic US 50 Bus. ====
U.S. Route 50 Business
- Location: Oakland–Castro Valley
- Existed: 1926–1964

The northern portion of I-880 was designated US 50 Business (US 50 Bus.) for a time between the I-80 interchange and Downtown Oakland.

==== Original routing in Sacramento ====
Interstate 880
- Location: West Sacramento–Sacramento
- Existed: 1971–1983

From 1971 to 1983, I-880 was the original route designation for the Beltline Freeway, the northern bypass freeway for the Sacramento area. This freeway begins in West Sacramento as a fork from the original I-80, continues northeast over the Sacramento River to its interchange with I-5, continues east through the communities of North Sacramento and Del Paso Heights, and ends at an interchange with the Roseville Freeway (I-80). The now-designated Capital City Freeway was then the original I-80 routing, continuing southwest directly into Downtown Sacramento. I-80 was then rerouted along the Beltline Freeway in 1983, while the Capital City Freeway became I-80 Bus.

=== Modern history ===
==== Cypress Viaduct and the 1989 Loma Prieta earthquake ====
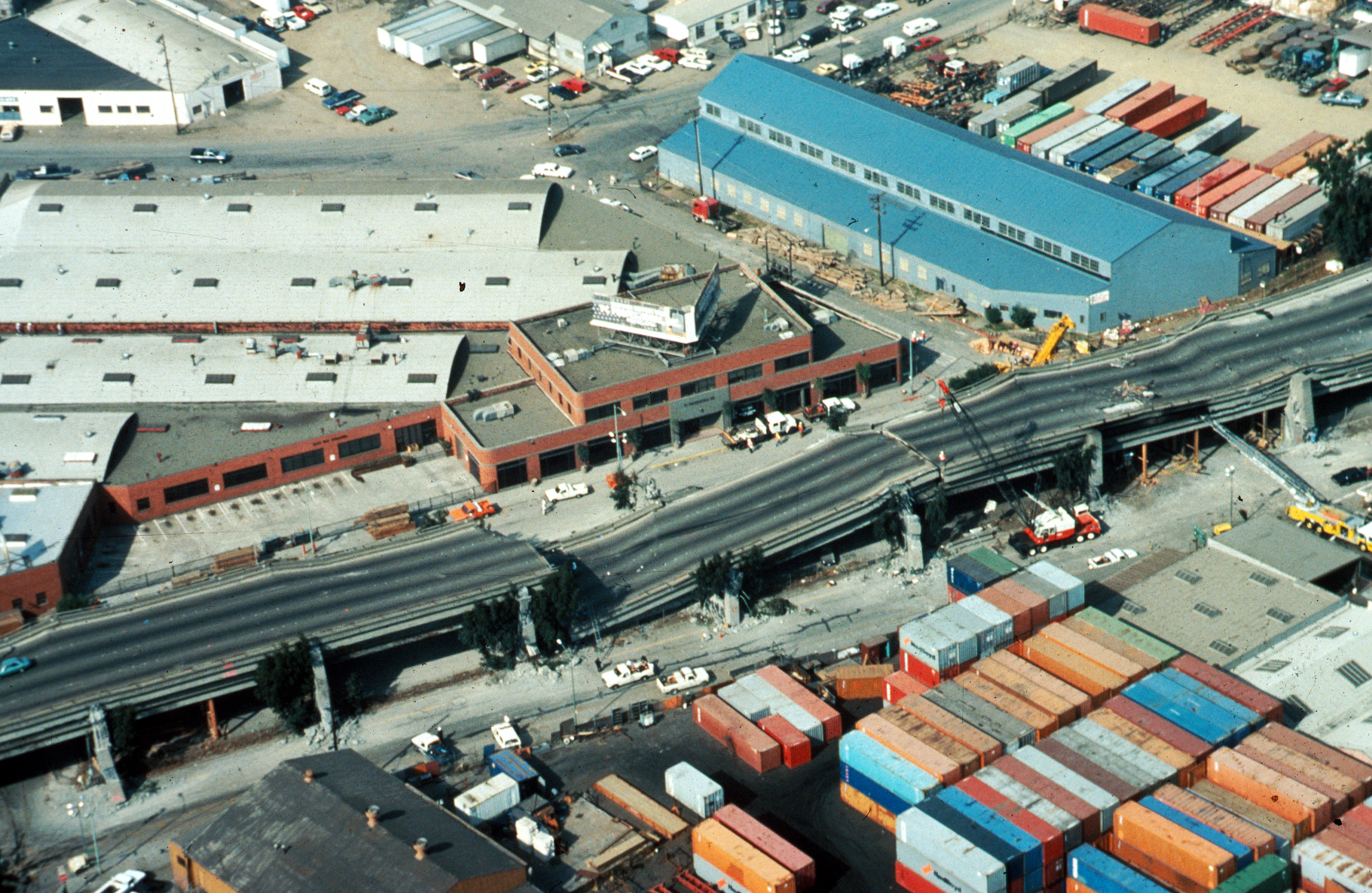
Portion of the collapsed Cypress Viaduct in Oakland

A large double-decker section in Oakland, known as the Cypress Street Viaduct, collapsed during the 1989 Loma Prieta earthquake, causing 42 deaths; initial estimates were significantly higher, but, because many commuters on both sides of the bay had left early or stayed late to watch Game 3 of the San Francisco–Oakland World Series, the freeway was far less crowded than normal at the time of the quake.

Due to environmental impact concerns, and the desire by the West Oakland community to reconnect the neighborhood with the rest of the city, among other reasons, a new route was selected along an industrial area and railroad yard around the outskirts of the neighborhood. Although only about three miles (4.8 km) in length, the replacement freeway cost over $1.2 billion (equivalent to $2.08 billion in 2025), and did not open until 1997 for several reasons: it crossed over and under the elevated Bay Area Rapid Transit (BART) line to San Francisco; it squeezed between a post office, the West Oakland station, the Port of Oakland, a railyard, and an East Bay Municipal Utility District sewage treatment plant; it occupied an entirely new right-of-way, which required the acquisition of large amounts of valuable industrial real estate near the Port of Oakland; and it had to be earthquake resistant. Furthermore, a new interchange was constructed south of Grand Avenue, where ramps connect to I-80 west via a viaduct crossing the rail tracks and Grand Avenue, avoiding the MacArthur Maze completely; these ramps carry the hidden state designation of Route 880S (for "supplemental"). A new flyover exit ramp to I-80 east was also constructed to cross over the existing MacArthur Maze structure.

The former path of the Cypress Street Viaduct was then renamed Mandela Parkway, and the median where the freeway stood became a landscaped linear park.

==== Flood plains ====
Several aspects of the I-880 facility have been constructed in designated floodplains such as the 1990 and 2004 interchange improvements at Dixon Landing Road. In that case, the FHWA was required to make a finding that there was no feasible alternative to the new ramp system as designed. In that same study, the FHWA produced an analysis to support the fact that adequate wetlands mitigation had been designed into the improvement project.

==== Sound barriers ====
Due to high sound levels generated from this highway and the relatively dense urban development in the highway corridor, the California Department of Transportation (Caltrans) has conducted numerous studies to retrofit the right-of-way with noise barriers. This activity has occurred in Oakland, San Leandro, Hayward, Newark, and Fremont. During the 1989 widening of I-880 in parts of Newark and Fremont, scientific studies were conducted to determine the need for sound walls and to design optimum heights to achieve Federal noise standards.

==== No interchange with SR 87/Guadalupe Freeway ====
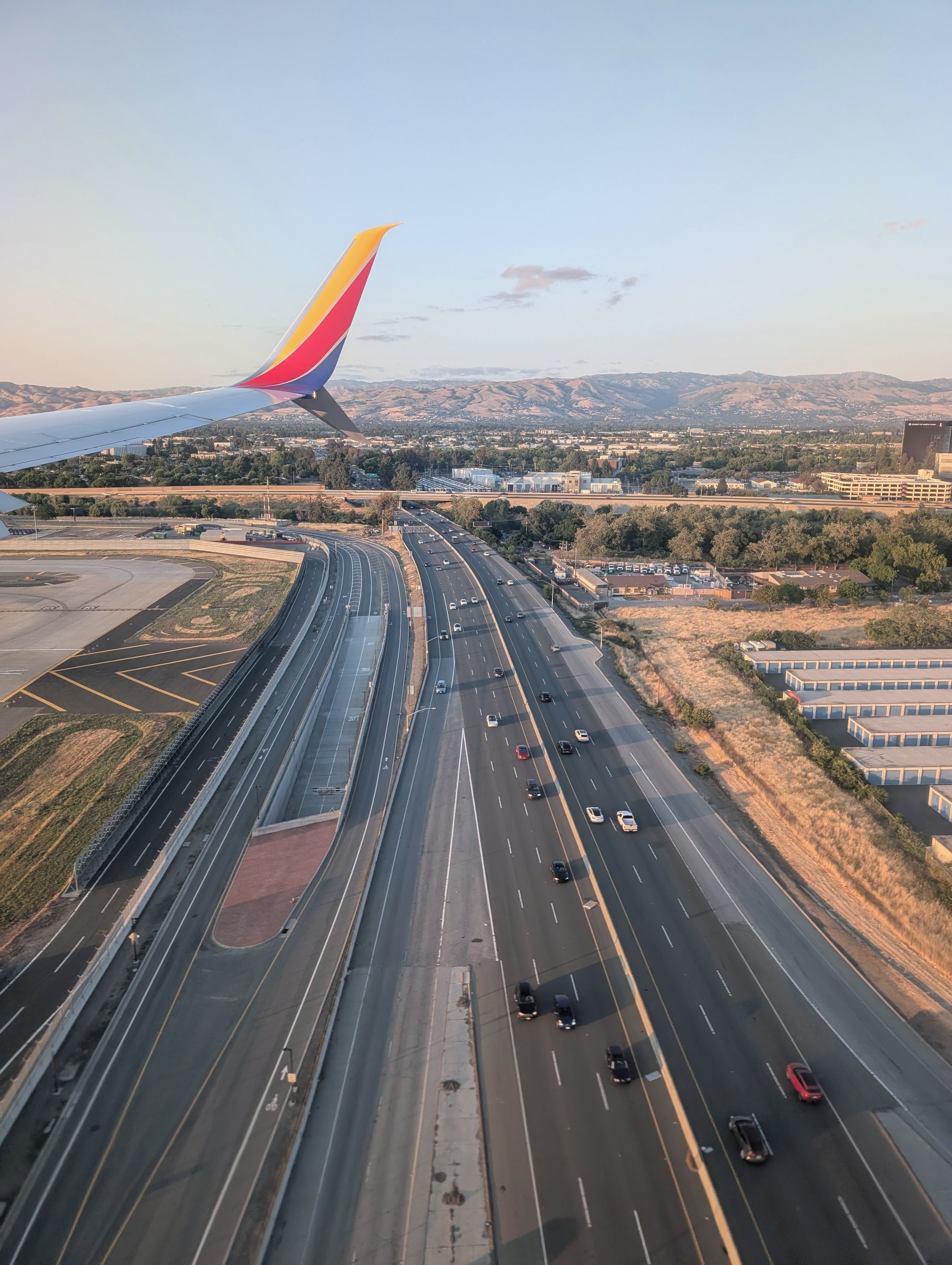
A view of I-880 and the SR 87 overpass from a plane arriving at SJC

Between Coleman Avenue and 1st Street in San Jose, SR 87 (Guadalupe Freeway) crosses above I-880 without an interchange, making it the only point in California where two freeways cross without a connection. Because of its proximity to the runways at San Jose International Airport, Caltrans cannot construct elevated ramps without them interfering with flight paths. Tunneling underneath to build underground ramps would also make a significant environmental impact to the nearby Guadalupe River.

==== Gasoline tanker accident in 2007 ====
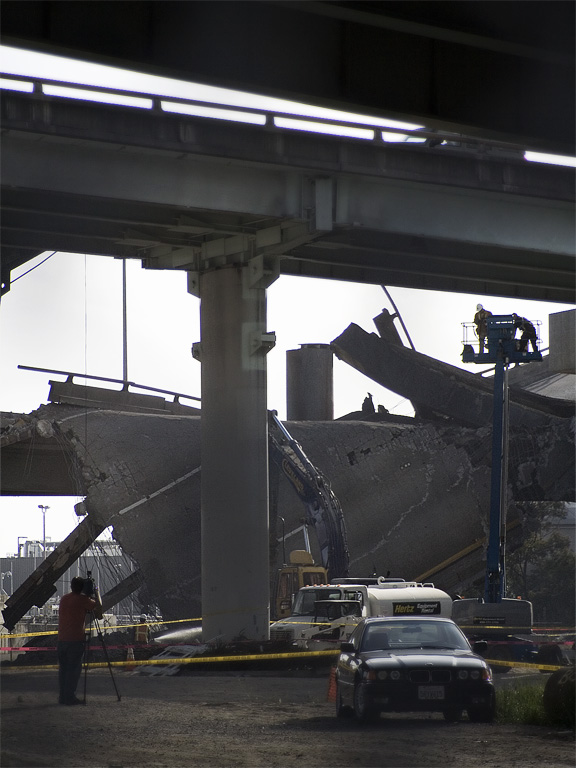
A portion of I-880 following the 2007 collapse

On April 29, 2007, a gasoline tanker overturned and caught fire on the connector between westbound I-80 and southbound I-880 on the MacArthur Maze interchange. The fire caused major damage to both this connector and one directly above (eastbound I-80 onto eastbound I-580). The overpass was replaced and reopened 27 days later. The governor, Arnold Schwarzenegger, declared it as a state of emergency and all public transportation was free on the first commute day.

==== 2012–2015 I-880/I-280 interchange improvement ====
Improvements to the I-280/I-880 and Stevens Creek Boulevard interchanges finished early 2015. Changes included breaking up the handful of ramps that both interchanges shared so they would be independent from one another. Construction began in late 2012 and the ramp from I-280 north to I-880 north opened in April 2015.

==== I-880 Corridor Improvement Project ====
The I-880 Corridor Improvement Project, one of the last seismic retrofit projects of a major transportation corridor in California, consisted of eight separate projects located in a 15-mile (24 km) segment of the freeway between Oakland and Hayward.

The overall goal of the project was to improve the seismic safety of the corridor. After the 1989 Loma Prieta earthquake, Caltrans initiated Phase 1 of its seismic retrofit program. After the 1994 Northridge earthquake, Caltrans initiated Phase 2 of its seismic retrofit program, which included projects along the I-880 corridor. Other goals include reducing traffic congestion and improving road quality.

The individual projects included in the I-880 Corridor Improvement Project were retrofitting or replacing the 5th Avenue, 23rd Avenue, 29th Avenue, Fruitvale Avenue, and High Street bridges in Oakland; improvements to both the I-238 and SR 92 interchanges (the latter, a four-year project, completed in October 2011); and an overall rehabilitation/repaving project along the entire segment. Construction began in 2006, although certain projects were completed in 2020. The total cost of the project is $462.7 million (equivalent to $710 million in 2025), provided by federal, state, and regional funds.

== Exit list ==
County	Location	mi	km	Exit	Destinations	Notes
Santa Clara	San Jose	0.00	0.00	1A	SR 17 south – Santa Cruz	Southern terminus; stack interchange; I-280 exit 5B; freeway continues south on SR 17
Santa Clara	San Jose	0.00	0.00	1B	I-280 (Junipero Serra Freeway north, Sinclair Freeway west) – San Francisco, Downtown San Jose	Southern terminus; stack interchange; I-280 exit 5B; freeway continues south on SR 17
Santa Clara	San Jose	0.41	0.66	1C	Stevens Creek Boulevard, West San Carlos Street	Northbound access via SR 17 north exit 27B
Santa Clara	San Jose	1.25	2.01	1D	Bascom Avenue – Santa Clara	Signed as exits 1A (south) and 1B (north) northbound
Santa Clara	San Jose	2.08	3.35	2	SR 82 (The Alameda) – Santa Clara	Former US 101
Santa Clara	San Jose	2.67	4.30	3	Coleman Avenue – Mineta San Jose International Airport	
Santa Clara	San Jose	3.20	5.15	—	SR 87 (Guadalupe Freeway)	Closed, as the proximity to both the Guadalupe River and San Jose International Airport makes the construction of ramps impractical
Santa Clara	San Jose	3.57	5.75	4A	First Street – Downtown San Jose	
Santa Clara	San Jose	4.08	6.57	4B	US 101 (Bayshore Freeway) – Los Angeles, San Francisco	Southbound access to US 101 north is via exit 4C/10th Street; signed as exits 4B (south) and 4C (north) northbound; US 101 exits 388B-C
Santa Clara	San Jose	4.37	7.03	4D	Gish Road	Northbound signage
Santa Clara	San Jose	4.37	7.03	4C	To US 101 north (Old Bayshore Highway) / 10th Street – San Francisco	Southbound signage
Santa Clara	San Jose	5.34	8.59	5	Brokaw Road	
Santa Clara	San Jose	6.70	10.78	7	Montague Expressway (CR G4)	
Santa Clara	Milpitas	7.69	12.38	8A	Great Mall Parkway, Tasman Drive	
Santa Clara	Milpitas			—	I-880 Express Lanes south ends	South end of southbound Express Lane
Santa Clara	Milpitas	8.42	13.55	8B	SR 237 (Calaveras Boulevard) / McCarthy Boulevard – Mountain View, Milpitas	Signed as exits 8B (east) and 8C (west) southbound. No southbound entrance from McCarthy Boulevard; SR 237 exits 9B-C
Santa Clara	Milpitas			—	SR 237 Express Lanes west – Mountain View	Express Lanes exit only; southbound exit and northbound entrance
Santa Clara–Alameda county line	Milpitas–Fremont line	10.41	16.75	10	Dixon Landing Road	
Santa Clara–Alameda county line	Milpitas–Fremont line	10.41	16.75	—	I-880 Express Lanes north begins	South end of northbound Express Lane
Alameda	Fremont	12.26– 12.60	19.73– 20.28	12	Mission Boulevard (SR 262 east) to I-680 / Warren Avenue – Sacramento	Signed as exits 12 (Mission Boulevard) and 13A (Warren Avenue) northbound
Alameda	Fremont	13.49	21.71	13	Fremont Boulevard South, Cushing Parkway	Signed as exit 13B northbound
Alameda	Fremont	14.23	22.90	Weigh station		
Alameda	Fremont	14.94	24.04	15	Auto Mall Parkway	
Alameda	Fremont–Newark line	16.47	26.51	16	Stevenson Boulevard	
Alameda	Fremont–Newark line	17.42	28.03	17	Mowry Avenue – Central Fremont	
Alameda	Fremont–Newark line	19.07	30.69	19	SR 84 east (Thornton Avenue) – Central Newark	South end of SR 84 overlap; Central Newark not signed southbound
Alameda	Fremont–Newark line	20.53	33.04	21	SR 84 west (Decoto Road) – Dumbarton Bridge	North end of SR 84 overlap
Alameda	Fremont	21.71	34.94	22	Fremont Boulevard North, Alvarado Boulevard	
Alameda	Union City	23.28	37.47	23	Alvarado Niles Road	
Alameda	Union City–Hayward line	23.90	38.46	24	Whipple Road, Industrial Parkway, Dyer Street	Dyer Street not signed northbound, Industrial Parkway not signed southbound
Alameda	Hayward	24.76	39.85	25	Industrial Parkway	Northbound exit is via exit 24
Alameda	Hayward	25.87	41.63	26	Tennyson Road	
Alameda	Hayward	26.92	43.32	27	SR 92 (Jackson Street) – San Mateo Bridge	SR 92 exits 26A-B
Alameda	Hayward	27.83	44.79	28	Winton Avenue	
Alameda	Hayward	28.58	46.00	29	A Street – San Lorenzo	San Lorenzo not signed southbound
Alameda	San Lorenzo	30.39	48.91	30	Hesperian Boulevard	Northbound signage
Alameda	San Lorenzo	30.55	49.17	30	Lewelling Boulevard – San Lorenzo	Southbound signage
Alameda	San Lorenzo	30.55	49.17	—	I-880 Express Lanes north ends	North end of northbound Express Lanes
Alameda	San Leandro	30.91	49.74	31A	I-238 south to I-580 – Castro Valley, Stockton	Signed as exit 31 southbound; I-238 north exits 16A/17B
Alameda	San Leandro	31.05	49.97	31B	Washington Avenue	Southbound exit is part of exit 31
Alameda	San Leandro	33.06	53.20	33	Marina Boulevard	Signed as exits 33A (east) and 33B (west)
Alameda	San Leandro	33.87	54.51	34	Davis Street (SR 112)	
Alameda	Oakland	34.97	56.28	35	98th Avenue – Oakland International Airport	
Alameda	Oakland	35.71	57.47	36	Hegenberger Road – Oakland Coliseum, Oakland International Airport	
Alameda	Oakland	35.71	57.47	—	I-880 Express Lanes south begins	North end of southbound Express Lanes
Alameda	Oakland	36.83	59.27	37	66th Avenue, Zhone Way – Oakland Coliseum	
Alameda	Oakland	37.94	61.06	38	High Street (SR 77) – Alameda	
Alameda	Oakland	38.91	62.62	39A	29th Avenue, Fruitvale Avenue	Replacement 29th Avenue overpass and new northbound exit ramp completed c. 2019
Alameda	Oakland	39.16	63.02	39B	23rd Avenue – Alameda	Alameda not signed northbound
Alameda	Oakland	40.03	64.42	40	Embarcadero, Fifth Avenue, 16th Avenue	No northbound entrance; 16th Avenue not signed northbound; Fifth Avenue not signed southbound
Alameda	Oakland	41.31	66.48	41A	Oak Street, Lakeside Drive	Northbound exit and southbound entrance
Alameda	Oakland	41.32	66.50	—	Jackson Street	Northbound entrance only
Alameda	Oakland	41.32	66.50	41B	Broadway – Downtown Oakland	Northbound exit and southbound entrance
Alameda	Oakland	41.91	67.45	42A	I-980 east (Grove Shafter Freeway) to SR 24 – Walnut Creek	Northbound exit and southbound entrance
Alameda	Oakland	42.33	68.12	42B	Market Street – Harbor Terminal	Northbound exit and southbound entrance
Alameda	Oakland	43.02	69.23	42	Broadway (to SR 61) – Alameda	New interchange added upon post-1989 Loma Prieta earthquake realignment; southbound exit and northbound entrance
Alameda	Oakland			—	8th Street, Cypress Street	Closed in aftermath of 1989 Loma Prieta earthquake; was northbound exit only
Alameda	Oakland	43.73	70.38	44	7th Street, West Grand Avenue	Formerly also served Kirkham Street in pre-1989 earthquake alignment; northbound exit and southbound entrance; exit ramp added upon post-earthquake realignment
Alameda	Oakland			—	14th Street – Downtown Oakland	Closed in aftermath of 1989 Loma Prieta earthquake; was northbound entrance and southbound exit
Alameda	Oakland			—	Cypress Street, Peralta Street	Closed in aftermath of 1989 Loma Prieta earthquake; was southbound exit only
Alameda	Oakland			—	Cypress Street at 32nd Street	Closed in aftermath of 1989 Loma Prieta earthquake; was northbound entrance only
Alameda	Oakland	45.63	73.43	46A	I-80 Toll west – Bay Bridge, San Francisco	Northbound left exit and southbound entrance; both ramps are unsigned SR 880S; southern end of MacArthur Maze; exit goes directly to the Bay Bridge toll plaza; I-80 east exit 8A
Alameda	Oakland	45.63	73.43	44	West Grand Avenue, 7th Street	New interchange added upon post-1989 Loma Prieta earthquake realignment; southbound exit and northbound entrance
Alameda	Oakland	45.63	73.43	46B	I-80 east / I-580 west (Eastshore Freeway) – San Rafael, Sacramento	Northern terminus; northern end of MacArthur Maze; northbound exit and southbound entrance; no access to/from MacArthur Freeway (I-580 east); I-80 west exit 8B
1.000 mi = 1.609 km; 1.000 km = 0.621 mi: Closed/former; Concurrency terminus; Electronic toll collection; Incomplete access
