= C. C. Myers =

Defunct Rancho Cordova, California based construction company

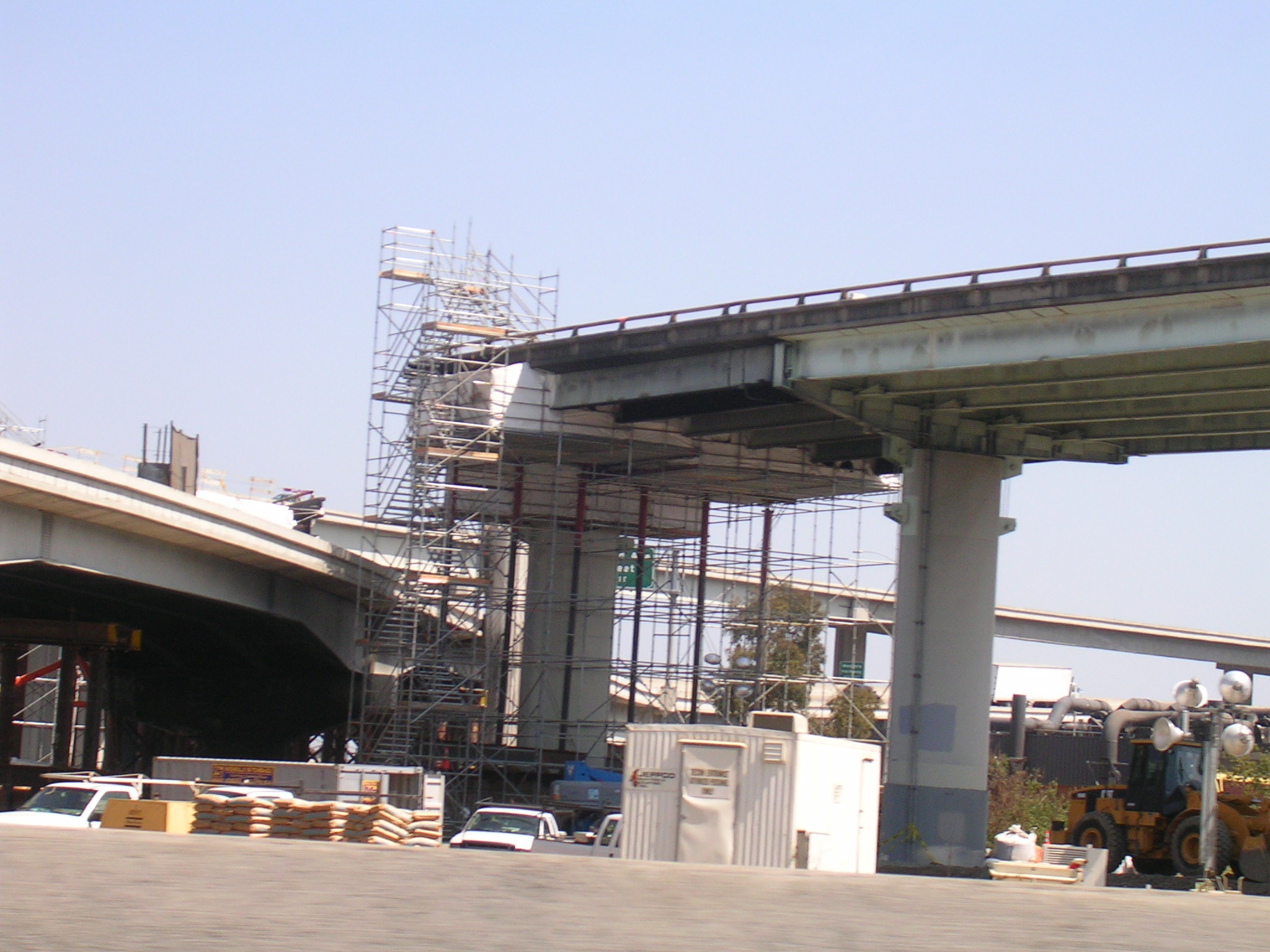
C.C. Myers, Inc. reconstruction work on the eastbound Interstate 580 connector ramp, MacArthur Maze, Oakland, California, May 2007

C.C. Myers, Inc. was a Rancho Cordova, California based construction company specializing in building highways and bridges. Started in 1977 by Clinton C. Myers, the company re-formed as an Employee Owned Venture in 2008, or ESOP company. The company filed for Chapter 7 bankruptcy and turned its assets over to the court to be distributed to creditors in 2016.

== History ==
Founded on January 31, 1977, C.C. Myers, Inc. started as a civil construction bridge building company from its first project at Emigrant Gap, CA. As the company grew, it completed over 250 projects and over 1,000 bridges.

In 1989, after the Loma Prieta earthquake, C.C. Myers, Inc. crews working near the Cypress Freeway were some of the first people on the scene of the collapsed freeway. They assisted in shoring up the structure while rescue efforts were underway for people trapped in the collapsed section of freeway.

The company was awarded an emergency contract by the California Department of Transportation Caltrans in the aftermath of the earthquake to rebuild a section of Highway 1 where it crosses Struve Slough. This was the beginning of C.C. Myers, Inc.'s reputation as an emergency contractor.

In 1994, the Northridge earthquake in Southern California damaged four bridges on the Santa Monica Freeway in Los Angeles. C.C. Myers, Inc. won the contract to replace them. The contract specified that the work had to be completed in 140 days, and the State of California, understanding the loss to the LA economy that was caused by the freeway being down, offered a $200,000 per day bonus for each day prior to the 140 days that the bridge opened. With the cooperation and extra effort from Caltrans, the City of Los Angeles, the workers, and even the citizens of LA, the company completed the job in 66 days, a full 74 days ahead of schedule. The $14.8M bonus is the largest early completion bonus paid by Caltrans. The closure of the freeway was estimated to cost the economy of the area as much as $1M per day.

In 2005 C.C. Myers started looking toward retirement. The end result of his work was a strong company that bore his name, and wanting the legacy to continue, he gave the company to his employees through an ESOP transaction. C.C. Myers, Inc. employees now own their own company. Myers declared personal bankruptcy in 2008 over an unrelated personal business venture. The construction company was not directly affected by the bankruptcy but Myers lost his stake in the ownership. Since leaving C.C. Myers, Inc., Mr. Myers formed a new construction company in 2010, Myers and Sons Construction, LP.

As C.C. Myers, Inc. grew, so did its share of emergency work. By its 34th year in business, C.C. Myers, Inc. will have completed 19 emergency projects. In 2007, the speedy Macarthur Maze rebuild garnered a $5M bonus for opening the collapsed freeway 27 days ahead of the deadline.

In 2016 C.C. Myers filed for Chapter 7 bankruptcy. The company’s remaining assets were turned over to the court to be distributed to creditors.

== Notable Projects ==
- Harbor Freeway (Route 110) Los Angeles - Elevated HOV Lanes
- El Toro "Y" Interchange (I-5/I-405) Orange County
- Walnut Creek Interchange (I-680/SR-24) Walnut Creek, CA
- San Francisco International Airport Ramps
- American River Bridge, Folsom, CA
- Temporary Bypass Structure, San Francisco - Oakland Bay Bridge, San Francisco, CA
- Russian River Bridge (SR-128), Geyserville, CA
- Galena Creek Bridge (I-580), Reno, NV
- MacArthur Maze Repair (I-580), Oakland, CA
- Bay Bridge Roll-Out Roll-In, San Francisco - Oakland Bay Bridge, San Francisco, CA
- Fix I-5, Sacramento, CA
- US-50 Echo Summit
