= Patchen Pass =

Mountain pass in the Santa Cruz Mountains of Northern California, United States

- Cuesta de Los Gatos
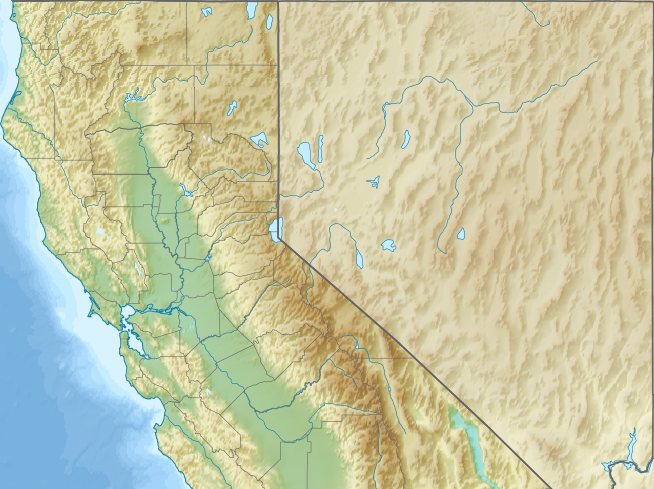
- Location within Northern California
- Elevation: 1,808 feet (551 m)
- Traversed by: SR 17

Third Approach
- Location: Santa Clara and Santa Cruz Counties, California
- Range: Santa Cruz Mountains
- Coordinates: 37°08′39″N 121°59′05″W

Patchen Pass (historically Cuesta de Los Gatos and also locally referred to as "the Summit") is a low mountain pass through the Santa Cruz Mountains of California, connecting the Santa Clara Valley to Santa Cruz and the Pacific coast. California State Route 17 traverses the pass at the Santa Clara–Santa Cruz county line, just south where the highway intersects with California State Route 35.

== Description ==
Patchen Pass lies on the border between Santa Clara County to the north of the pass, and Santa Cruz County to the south. It is traversed by State Route 17 (SR 17), which runs from north to south through the pass, and is the eastern terminus of SR 35, which runs along the ridgeline to the west of the pass and continues to the east as Summit Road. The nearest municipalities to the pass are Los Gatos, 8 miles (13 km) north, and Scotts Valley, 8 miles (13 km) south. Amenities at the pass include a restaurant on one side of SR 17, and a convenience store and marijuana dispensary on the other side. The elevation of the pass is marked as 1,800 feet (550 m) but has been variously reported as 1,840 feet (560 m) or 1,808 feet (551 m).

== History ==
In the 18th century, a trail across the pass formed part of the historic El Camino Real connecting Mission Santa Clara de Asís with Mission Santa Cruz, likely along a route followed earlier by Native Americans. Lakes near the summit made the place a popular fishing and swimming spot until the 1906 San Francisco earthquake caused them to dry up. In 1940, SR 17 replaced the Soquel San Jose Road through the pass; the old alignment still crosses the pass, a short distance to the east of SR 17, as the Old Santa Cruz Highway. A Southern Pacific passenger train line through the pass, from Los Gatos to Olympia, opened in 1880 but closed again after storms in early 1940 caused mudslides and washouts on the line.

== Name ==
The pass was historically called Cuesta de Los Gatos (Spanish for "Wildcat Ridge") by John C. Frémont, but the same name may refer more generally to that part of the Santa Cruz Mountains. The pass itself was renamed to Patchen Pass in the 1970s by several local government bodies, at the instigation of local politician Albert B. Smith and over the objections of local historians. The name "Patchen" comes from the nearby ghost town of Patchen; in turn, the town of Patchen may have been named after a famous race horse, or possibly after the activity of sewing patches on clothes. Locally, the pass is more often referred to as "the Summit" than by either of its official names. Alternatively, taking the route over the pass is called going "over the hill".
