= California State Route 17 =

State highway in Santa Cruz and Santa Clara counties in California, United States

State Route 17
- SR 17 highlighted in red

Route information
- Maintained by Caltrans
- Length: 26.49 mi (42.63 km)
- Existed: 1930s–present

Major junctions
- South end: SR 1 in Santa Cruz
- SR 9 in Los Gatos; SR 85 in Los Gatos
- North end: I-280 / I-880 in San Jose

Location
- Country: United States
- State: California
- Counties: Santa Cruz, Santa Clara

Highway system
- State highways in California; Interstate; US; State; Scenic; History; Pre‑1964; Unconstructed; Deleted; Freeways
← SR 16	→ SR 18

State Route 17 (SR 17, locally known as Highway 17) is a state highway in the U.S. state of California that runs from State Route 1 in Santa Cruz to I-280 and I-880 in San Jose. SR 17, a freeway and expressway, carries substantial commuter and vacation traffic through the Santa Cruz Mountains at Patchen Pass ("The Summit") between Santa Cruz and the San Francisco Bay Area.

== Route description ==
Route 17 is defined in section 317 of the California Streets and Highways Code, and that the highway is "from Route 1 near Santa Cruz to Route 280 in San Jose".

From its southern terminus with SR 1 in Santa Cruz, Route 17 begins as a five-lane freeway (narrows to four lanes after Pasatiempo Drive). From there, it proceeds through Scotts Valley. At the north end of Scotts Valley, it becomes a four-lane divided highway, with access at various points without interchanges, and begins a winding ascent of the Santa Cruz Mountains. The road crosses the Santa Clara/Santa Cruz county line through the Patchen Pass, commonly referred to as "The Summit", at an elevation of 1,800 feet (549 m), where there is an interchange with SR 35. Just north of the summit, a winding descent of the mountains begins, again with access at various points, mostly without grade separations, as far as Los Gatos. South of Santa Cruz Avenue in Los Gatos, SR 17 becomes a freeway again. It expands to six lanes after an interchange with SR 85. This interchange has three levels; in a similar fashion to SR 99 at U.S. 50 in Sacramento, SR 17 is at-grade, with the other levels below-grade. The number of lanes later expands to eight shortly before reaching its northern terminus at Interstate 280, where it continues as Interstate 880.

SR 17 is part of the California Freeway and Expressway System, and is part of the National Highway System, a network of highways that are considered essential to the country's economy, defense, and mobility by the Federal Highway Administration. SR 17 is eligible to be included in the State Scenic Highway System, but it is not officially designated as a scenic highway by the California Department of Transportation.

=== Safety ===
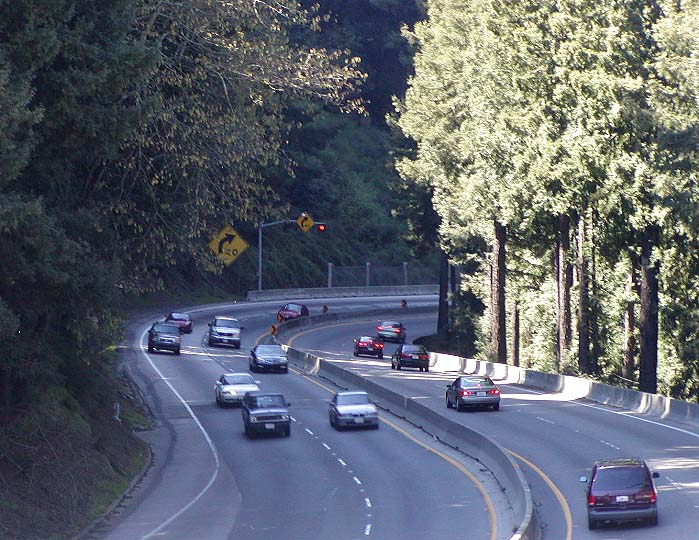
Looking downhill from the Summit Road overpass; brake lights can be seen as cars slow down before the curve known as "Valley Surprise".

The four lane section of SR 17 is known as "Killer 17." It has a combination of narrow lanes, dense traffic, slow trucks, sharp turns, blind curves, sudden changes in traffic speeds, and wandering fauna such as deer, wild turkeys, and mountain lions, which has led to a number of collisions and fatalities. Because of this, SR 17 is considered to be one of the most dangerous highways in the state. In the winter months, because SR 17 crosses a high precipitation area in the Santa Cruz Mountains, the roadway can become slippery from rain, snow or ice, especially at the summit, and heavy rain results in mudslides.

Despite having fewer curves than in Santa Cruz County, certain sections of SR 17 in Santa Clara County are so dangerous that they have been nicknamed. The first long downhill turn North of Summit Road is named "Valley Surprise" for the fact that so many "Valleys" are caught driving too fast into the sharpening curve, and end up striking the median. The most infamous is called "Big Moody Curve". This curve is named after Big Moody Creek below, slightly greater than a 180 degree turn, and bracketed by additional 90 degree turns. The inside surfaces of the median barriers in both of these turns are normally chipped up and black with tire rubber.

Efforts to improve safety have included adding electronic speed monitoring signs and warnings lights on curves, removing trees to improve visibility around blind curves, and increased patrol and enforcement of traffic laws. The portion between Los Gatos and Scotts Valley has been designated the Highway 17 Safety Corridor by Caltrans and the California Highway Patrol. In addition, barbed wired fencing and retaining walls were added after the route suffered landslides in the Loma Prieta Earthquake. The route has seen recent repaving work in 2010, 2014, 2019–2020, and 2022-2023.

Gillian Cichowski Memorial Overcrossing Bridge, over SR 17 near Los Gatos at Lexington Reservoir, was named by California Senate Concurrent Resolution 32, Chapt. 70 in 1994. Gillian Cichowski was killed in an accident at this location in 1992. This is one of the few highway constructions in California named for a woman. The overpass was in response to a campaign by friends of Gillian Cichowski to make the intersection (with Bear Creek Road) safer. The overpass was open to northbound traffic July 18, 1996 and opened to southbound traffic August 29, 1996. Margaret Green of Sunnyvale, California died in a similar accident near the same location during overpass construction.

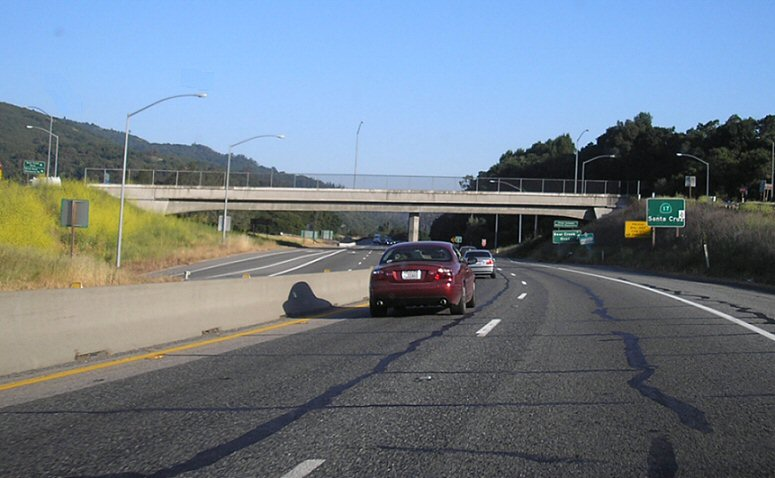
Gillian Cichowski Memorial Overcrossing.

SR 17 in Santa Cruz County is named after California Highway Patrol Lieutenant Michael Walker. Walker was setting flares to direct traffic around an auto accident on New Year's Eve 2005 when he was struck and killed. Partly in response to this accident near the Glenwood Road intersection, Caltrans began work in 2008 to widen the shoulder to eight feet.

== History ==
In 1934, the State of California began signing its routes. The route which in subsequent years corresponded with State Route 17 was signed as State Route 13, and described as "Santa Cruz to Jct. US 101 at San Rafael, via San Jose, Mt. Eden, and Oakland." The route taken between Oakland and San Rafael is not described.

Beginning in 1929, the segment from San Jose northward had been signed as US 101-E ("east"), branching off from US 101-W in San Jose.

=== Santa Cruz Mountains ===
The earliest connection between Santa Cruz and San Jose was an old Native American foot trail. The first road that could be navigated by a wagon was a dirt toll road built by Charlie McKiernan, known as "Mountain Charlie" by locals, some time around 1853. Portions of this road still exist as Mountain Charlie Road, to the west of Highway 17 and south of Summit Road. Several other stage lines were built as competitors, such as the San Jose Turnpike (1863), which follows the approximate route of present-day Soquel San Jose Road. After realignment to increase the road width; many sections of the original stage route were cut off. These sections became side streets named with variations containing Old Turnpike. Some of these now dead end streets have retained the look of narrow stage coach roads.

SR 17 was opened in 1940, replacing several other modes of transportation, including the old Glenwood Highway from 1919 (which still exists in Glenwood), and the railroad which went all the way from Santa Cruz to San Francisco and Oakland. The railroad stopped operating in 1940 and the tunnels that it passed through were sealed soon after. Nearly all the tunnel entrances still exist, but are unusable as the tunnels themselves have collapsed. The rise in the use of automobiles made the railroads unprofitable. The city of Glenwood, founded by Charles C. Martin in 1851, gained notoriety for hot springs in the area. The Glenwood Highway, which passed through town, was deserted when the "New 17" was built, and the town became a ghost of its former self. The town's final resident, Mrs. Ed C. Koch, the great-granddaughter of the founder, died in 1992, and Glenwood is a ghost town.

Parts of the original SR 17 lie underwater in Lexington Reservoir. When the reservoir was built, the highway was rerouted to higher ground, and the two towns along its path (Alma and Lexington) were abandoned. When the reservoir levels are extremely low, the old highway pavement is visible as well as some stone and concrete foundations of buildings.

=== East Bay ===
SR 17 first appeared along the east shore of San Francisco Bay in the mid-1930s. The original route between San Jose and Oakland ran along the Old Oakland Road, Main Street (Milpitas) and Warm Springs Boulevard (southern Fremont) proceeding along what is now Fremont Boulevard, which becomes Alvarado Boulevard in Northern Fremont, before entering Union City. From there, the route proceeded along Hesperian Boulevard in Hayward, then into San Leandro via East 14th Street to Davis. It then went west on Davis to Maitland Drive along the southern edge of the Oakland Municipal Airport and across Bay Farm Island to the Bay Farm Island Bridge into Alameda. In Alameda it went via Clay, High, Santa Clara, and Webster to the Posey Tube. SR 17 went through the Posey Tube into Oakland along Harrison Street to 14th, and west on 14th to Broadway where it terminated at a junction with US 40 and SR 24.

Following the completion of the San Francisco-Oakland Bay Bridge in late 1936, SR 17 was re-routed. Instead of turning west at Davis Street in San Leandro, it was continued along East 14th Street into Oakland. At 44th Avenue it turned west, leading to a new diagonal connection to East 12th Street. SR 17 then followed East 12th northward to 14th Avenue, then one block on 14th to East 8th Street, becoming 8th Street into downtown Oakland. It continued west on 8th, picking up a concurrency with Business Route US 50 at Broadway. Both routes continued on 8th to Cypress Street which became an elevated viaduct entering the Bay Bridge Distribution Structure ("The Maze"). SR 17 terminated here at its junction with US 40 (Eastshore Highway) and US 50 (38th Street).

In 1947, work began on a new freeway through Oakland to replace the street routing of SR 17. It was finished in segments, finishing in 1958 with the completion of the double-decked Cypress Structure leading into the MacArthur Maze. The new freeway was called the "Eastshore Freeway", continuous with a planned new freeway north of the Maze to replace the old Eastshore Highway. In 1958, the freeway south of the Maze was renamed the "Nimitz Freeway", in honor of WWII Admiral Chester W. Nimitz.

With the completion of the Richmond-San Rafael Bridge in 1956, as well as the first segment of the Eastshore Freeway north of the Maze, SR 17 was extended northward along the new freeway in a concurrency with US 40. SR 17 left the freeway at the Hoffman Boulevard exit (thereafter popularly called the "Hoffman Split") and proceeded along city streets through Richmond to the San Rafael bridge. It went via Hoffman, Cutting, and Standard Avenue up to the bridge. It crossed the bridge into San Rafael, terminating at a junction with US 101.

In 1984 the segment of SR 17 from Interstate 280 in San Jose to the Maze (by then known as the "MacArthur Maze") in Oakland was renumbered as I-880, and the portion of SR 17 from the MacArthur Maze to San Rafael was renumbered as part of I-580. SR 17 was thereby reduced to its current length.

== Major intersections ==
Except where prefixed with a letter, postmiles were measured on the road as it was in 1964, based on the alignment that existed at the time, and do not necessarily reflect current mileage. Postmile prefixes include: R reflecting a realignment in the route since then, M indicating a second realignment, L referring to an overlap due to a correction or change, and T indicating postmiles classified as temporary. Segments that remain unconstructed or have been relinquished to local control may be omitted. The numbers reset at county lines; the start and end postmiles in each county are given in the county column.

County	Location	Postmile	Exit	Destinations	Notes
Santa Cruz; SCR 0.00-12.55	Santa Cruz	0.00		Ocean Street – Beaches	Northbound entrance only; southbound exit is via SR 1 exit 442
Santa Cruz; SCR 0.00-12.55	Santa Cruz	0.00	1A	SR 1 north – Santa Cruz, Half Moon Bay	Southern terminus; SR 1 north exit 441B, south exit 441
Santa Cruz; SCR 0.00-12.55	Santa Cruz	0.00	1B	SR 1 south – Watsonville, Monterey	Southern terminus; SR 1 north exit 441B, south exit 441
Santa Cruz; SCR 0.00-12.55	Pasatiempo	0.74	1C	Pasatiempo Drive	Signed as exit 1 northbound
Santa Cruz; SCR 0.00-12.55		2.18	2	El Rancho Drive, La Madrona Drive	Interchange conversion cancelled
Santa Cruz; SCR 0.00-12.55	Scotts Valley	3.44	3	Mount Hermon Road	
Santa Cruz; SCR 0.00-12.55	Scotts Valley	5.45	5	Granite Creek Road, Scotts Valley Drive (SR 17 Bus. south)	
Santa Cruz; SCR 0.00-12.55	Scotts Valley		6	Santas Village Road	Northbound exit and entrance
Santa Cruz; SCR 0.00-12.55	Scotts Valley		North end of freeway		
Santa Cruz–Santa Clara county line		12.55 0.00	Patchen Pass, elevation 1,808 feet (551 m)		
Santa Clara; SCL 0.00-13.95	Lexington Hills	0.11		SR 35 north (Summit Road)	Interchange; southern terminus of SR 35
Santa Clara; SCL 0.00-13.95	Lexington Hills	1.25		Redwood Estates (Oneda Court, Madrone Drive)	Interchange
Santa Clara; SCL 0.00-13.95		4.06		Bear Creek Road	Interchange
Santa Clara; SCL 0.00-13.95	Los Gatos		South end of freeway		
Santa Clara; SCL 0.00-13.95	Los Gatos	6.16	19	Santa Cruz Avenue	Northbound left exit and southbound entrance
Santa Clara; SCL 0.00-13.95	Los Gatos	7.07	20A	East Los Gatos (CR G10, Los Gatos-Saratoga Road east)	Western terminus of CR G10
Santa Clara; SCL 0.00-13.95	Los Gatos	7.07	20B	SR 9 south (Los Gatos-Saratoga Road west) – Los Gatos, Saratoga	Northern terminus of SR 9
Santa Clara; SCL 0.00-13.95	Los Gatos	8.89	21	Lark Avenue	Northbound entrance cannot access SR 85
Santa Clara; SCL 0.00-13.95	Los Gatos	9.35	22	SR 85 (West Valley Freeway) – Mountain View, Gilroy	SR 85 north exit 11, south exit 11A; trucks over 4.5 short tons (4.1 t) prohibited
Santa Clara; SCL 0.00-13.95	Campbell	10.50	23	Camden Avenue, San Tomas Expressway (CR G4)	Southern terminus of CR G4
Santa Clara; SCL 0.00-13.95	Campbell	12.34	25	Hamilton Avenue	
Santa Clara; SCL 0.00-13.95	San Jose	13.95	27A	I-280 south (Sinclair Freeway) – Downtown San Jose	Northern terminus; I-280 exit 5B
Santa Clara; SCL 0.00-13.95	San Jose	13.95	27B	I-280 north (Junipero Serra Freeway) / Stevens Creek Boulevard – San Francisco	Northern terminus; I-280 exit 5B
Santa Clara; SCL 0.00-13.95	San Jose	13.95	—	I-880 north (Nimitz Freeway) – Oakland	Continuation beyond I-280; former SR 17 north
1.000 mi = 1.609 km; 1.000 km = 0.621 mi: Incomplete access
