= Sinclair Freeway =

The Sinclair Freeway refers to portions of two contiguous stretches of freeway in California:

- Interstate 280 (California) between Route 17 and US 101
- Interstate 680 (California) between US 101 and the Alameda County line

The name is after Joseph P. Sinclair who was the District Engineer for District IV of the Division of Highways (now Caltrans) from 1952 to 1964. This stretch of I-280 and I-680 provided San Jose with its first freeway service. The concept for the freeway took shape during the tenure of Joseph Sinclair. It was named by Assembly Concurrent Resolution 104, Chapt. 168 in 1967.
