= Cypress Street Viaduct =

Interchange in California

Coordinates: 37.8168°N 122.2895°W

Cypress Street Viaduct
- Cypress Freeway, Nimitz Freeway
- Route of the viaduct in relation to modern roads

Route information
- Maintained by Caltrans
- Length: 1.78 mi (2.86 km)
- Status: Destroyed during the Loma Prieta earthquake
- Existed: June 11, 1957–October 17, 1989
- Component highways: SR 17 (entire length, 1957–1984); I-880 (entire length, 1984–1989)
- NHS: Entire route

Major junctions
- North end: I-80 / I-580 in Oakland
- South end: Market Street at 7th Street in Oakland

Location
- Country: United States
- State: California
- Counties: Alameda

Highway system
- Interstate Highway System; Main; Auxiliary; Suffixed; Business; Future; State highways in California; Interstate; US; State; Scenic; History; Pre‑1964; Unconstructed; Deleted; Freeways

The Cypress Street Viaduct, often referred to as the Cypress Structure or the Cypress Freeway, was a 1.6-mile-long (2.6 km), raised two-deck, multi-lane (four lanes per tier) freeway constructed of reinforced concrete that was originally part of the Nimitz Freeway (State Route 17, and later, Interstate 880) in Oakland, California, United States.

It replaced an earlier single-deck viaduct constructed in the 1930s as one of the approaches to the San Francisco–Oakland Bay Bridge. It was located along Cypress Street between 7th Street and Interstate 80 in the West Oakland neighborhood.

It officially opened to traffic on June 11, 1957, and was in use until October 17, 1989. At approximately 5:04 p.m. that day, a magnitude 6.9 earthquake struck the Bay Area, resulting in a large portion of the freeway's upper deck collapsing onto the lower deck. The collapse killed 42 people and resulted in the subsequent demolition of the structure.

The Cypress Freeway Memorial Park is located in Oakland, at 14th Street and Mandela Parkway.

== Construction ==
The double-decked viaduct was initially designed in 1949 by the City of Oakland as a way to ease traffic on local streets leading to the Bay Bridge, such as Cypress Street (which was California State Route 17 at the time). The route was supposedly chosen to displace perceived slums in West Oakland.

The southernmost portion of the Cypress Street viaduct, which was designed as a central off ramp structure exiting at Market Street between Fifth and Sixth Streets to the Eighth Street/Seventh Street on/off ramps, was the first phase of the overall project completed in October 1955, by contractors Frederickson and Watson at a cost of $1.7 million. Construction on the second phase of the project, the double-decked viaduct portion (which started from Adeline Street in the south to the MacArthur Maze in the north), began in February 1956 by contractors Grove, Wilson, Shepard and Kruge at a cost of $8.3 million, bringing the total cost of the viaduct project to $10 million. It was California's first double-decked freeway when it officially opened to traffic on June 11, 1957.

== Loma Prieta earthquake ==
On October 17, 1989, the portion of the structure from 16th Street north to the MacArthur Maze collapsed during the 1989 Loma Prieta earthquake, due to ground movement and structural flaws.

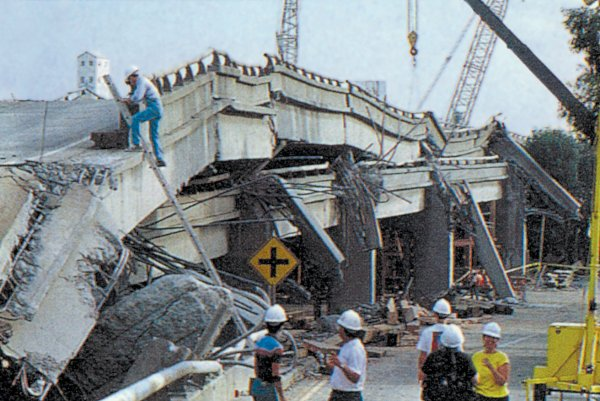
The collapsed Cypress Street Viaduct at the northern end, near the corner of Cypress and 32nd Streets

The upper deck was used by southbound traffic; the lower deck, by northbound traffic. Some sections of the Cypress Street Viaduct were largely supported by two columns on either side, but some sections were only supported by a single supporting column. The design was unable to survive the earthquake because the upper portions of the exterior columns were not tied by reinforcing to the lower columns, and the columns were not sufficiently ringed to prevent bursting (similar to Hanshin Expressway in Kobe, Japan). At the time of its design, such structures were not analyzed as a whole, and it appears that large structure motion contributed to the collapse. It was built on filled land on top of bay clay; filled land is highly susceptible to soil settlement during an earthquake, and bay clay exhibits larger ground motion. A small degree of earthquake reinforcement was added to the Cypress Street Viaduct in 1977.

After the earthquake stopped (with no aftershock), local residents and workers began crawling into and climbing upon the shattered structure with the goal of rescuing those left alive. Many were saved, some only by amputation of trapped limbs. The collapse of the upper tier onto the lower tier resulted in 42 fatalities—while this represented two-thirds of the total quake death toll of 63, it was a magnitude lower than initially feared; with San Francisco and Oakland in the World Series, many would-be commuters in both cities had left work early or stayed late to watch the upcoming Game 3, and as a result traffic on the viaduct was far lighter at the time of the quake than it normally would have been.

After the viaduct was torn down, Cypress Street was renamed Mandela Parkway, in honor of Nelson Mandela, and a landscaped median strip was planted where the viaduct once stood. Before reconstruction occurred, the viaduct ended at the 7th Street exit on the southern end, with the two roadways going over 7th Street, while the southbound exit off the MacArthur Maze onto Cypress Street at 32nd Street remained open to local traffic on the northern end.

== Reconstruction around West Oakland ==
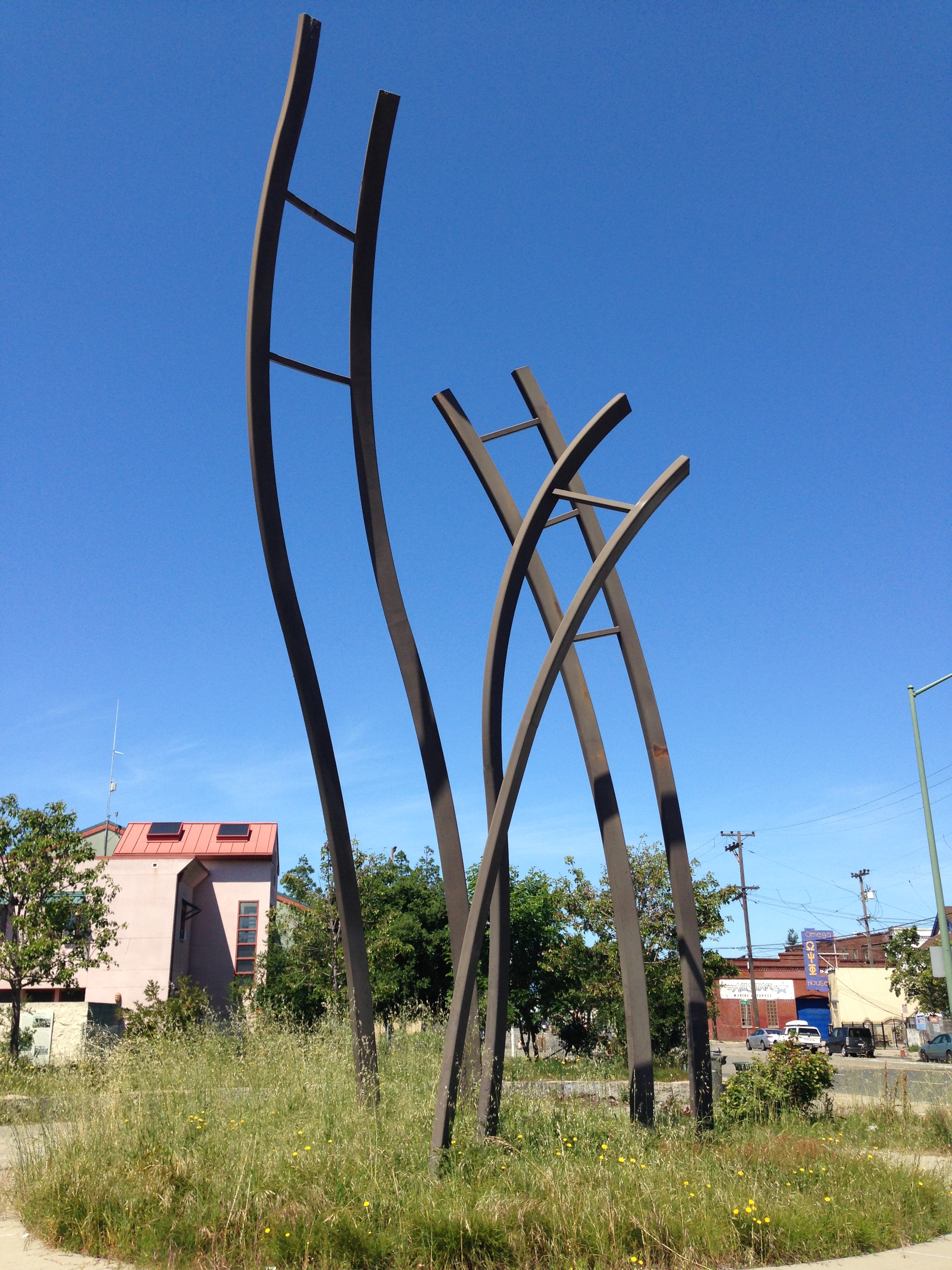
Cypress Freeway Memorial Park

In 1997, the Nimitz Freeway was rerouted to loop around the area using a largely ground-level design with more conventional single-level viaduct. The space was mainly taken from a railroad yard which was relocated. The exit at 8th Street was eliminated, a southbound exit near 7th and Union Street and a single northbound and southbound exit at 7th Street, near the Port of Oakland was constructed also providing access via Frontage Road to West Grand Avenue and the Oakland Army Base on Maritime Street, before a viaduct-type interchange splitting traffic to the Bay Bridge via Grand Avenue and also northbound to the Eastshore Freeway. With the westbound ramps from I-80 west to I-580 east/I-880 south realigned and widened, construction was complete by 2001.

During construction of the new section of the Nimitz Freeway, a team of archaeologists made many discoveries about the people who lived in West Oakland in the 19th century.

Due to cost overruns, the costs of the replacement freeway doubled from initial estimates of $650 million to $1.2 billion ($250 million per mile) making the five-mile freeway replacement the most expensive project in the state's history at the time. (It would be subsequently overshadowed by the northbound addition of the Benicia–Martinez Bridge and the Eastern span replacement of the San Francisco–Oakland Bay Bridge.) The cost overruns were mainly due to the opposition to replacing the highway on the site of the one partially destroyed in 1989, therefore requiring the purchase of land and property from Southern Pacific Railroad and Amtrak (moving part of the rail yard, which in turn caused the earthquake-damaged 16th Street Amtrak Station to be closed and replaced with two Amtrak stations in Jack London Square and Emeryville), the United States Postal Service (having to replace a parking lot with a parking garage), and the U.S. Army (the new route went through the Oakland Army Base), as well as replacing BART support beams.

== Exit list ==
The entire route was in Oakland, Alameda County.

mi	km	Destinations	Notes
		Market Street – Harbor Terminal	Northbound exit and southbound entrance, exit still exists as Exit 42B
		8th Street, Cypress Street	Northbound exit
		7th Street at Kirkham Street	Southbound entrance (Northbound exit added in 1997 by West Grand Avenue)
		14th Street – Downtown Oakland	Northbound entrance and southbound exit
		Cypress Street, Peralta Street	Southbound exit
		Cypress Street at 32nd Street	Northbound entrance
		I-580 (I-80 east) – San Rafael	Northbound exit and southbound entrance (Realigned in 1997; opened in 1998; completed in 2001)
		I-80 west – San Francisco, Berkeley, Sacramento	Northern terminus; northbound/westbound exit and southbound/eastbound entrance (Realigned in 1997)
1.000 mi = 1.609 km; 1.000 km = 0.621 mi: Incomplete access

== Gallery ==
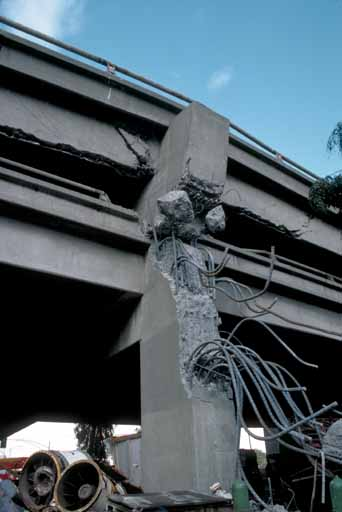
Due to improper design of rebar placement, the support columns broke with ease, sending the structure down.
Photo by H.G. Wilshire, USGS

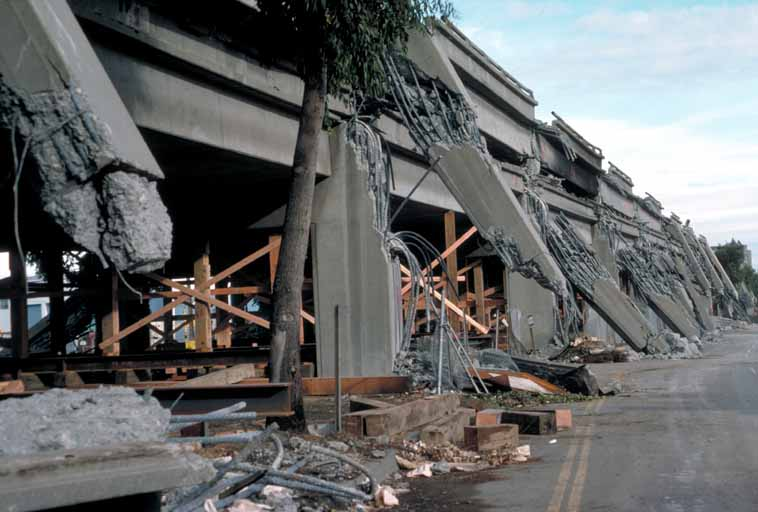
The collapsed Cypress Street Viaduct seen from ground level. Note the detachment of upper vertical elements from lower and the lack of reinforcement at the point of detachment.

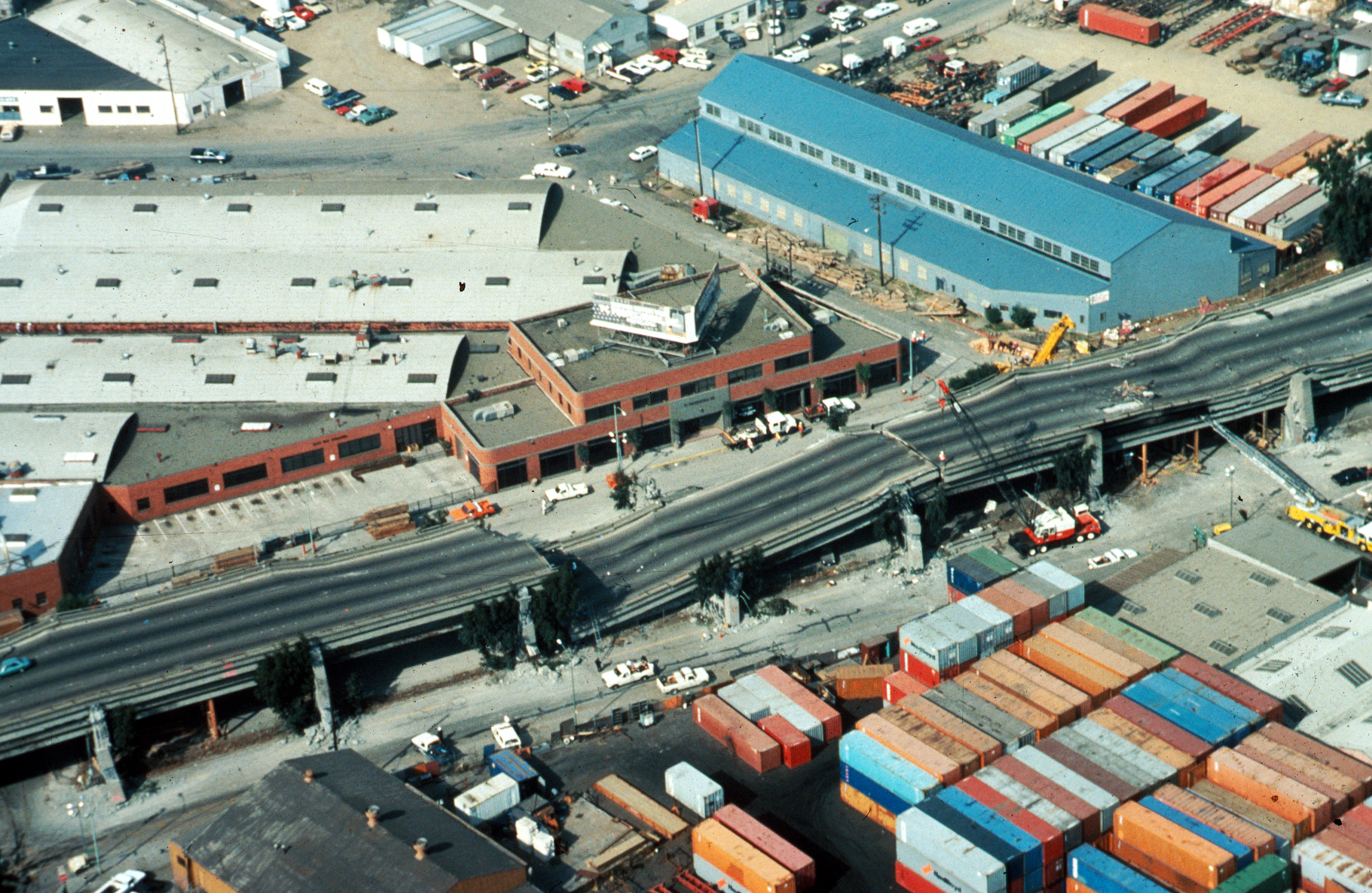
Portion of the collapsed Cypress Street Viaduct after the Loma Prieta earthquake; the collapse resulted in 42 fatalities.

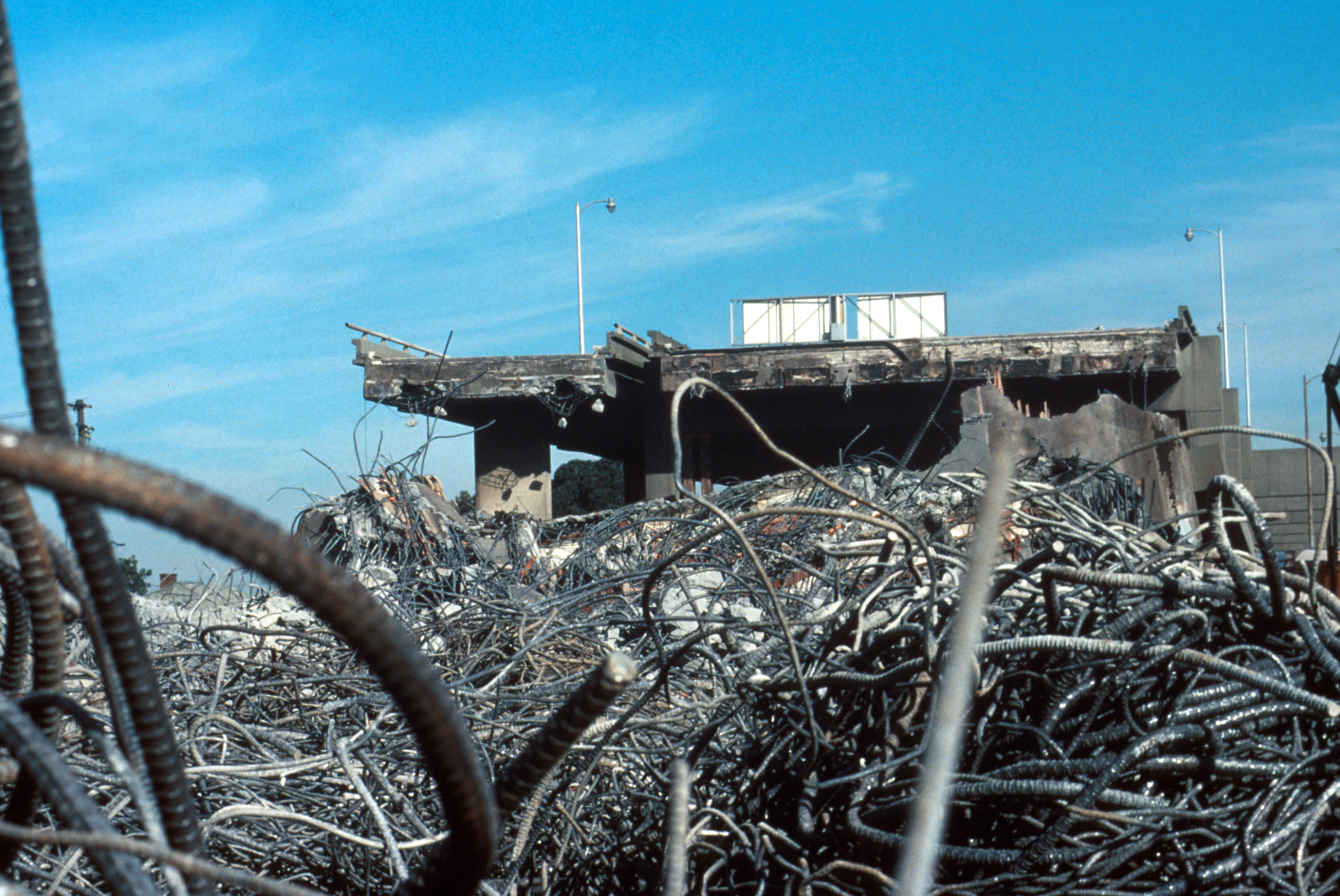
A pile of rebar and concrete from the collapsed Cypress Street Viaduct

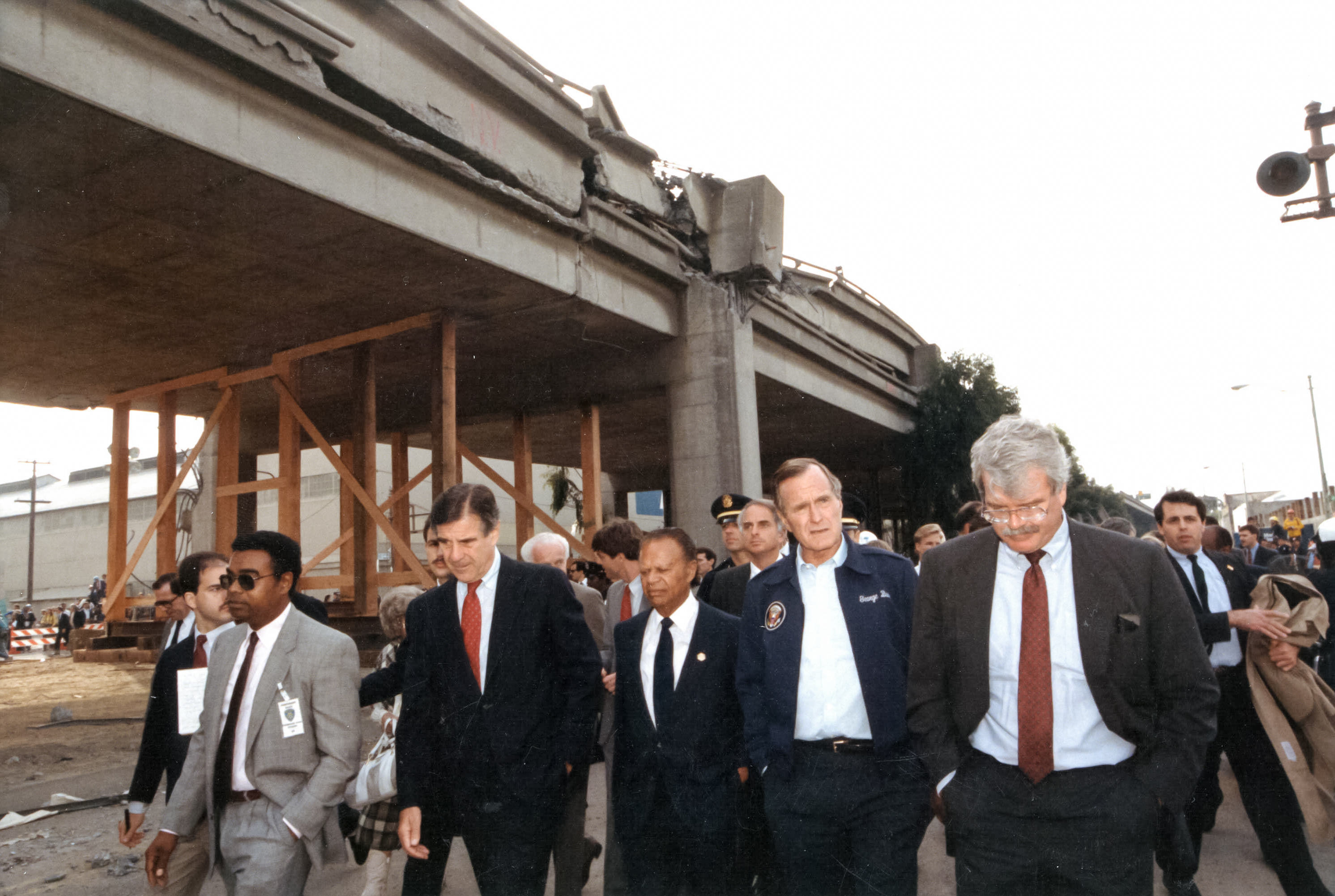
Rep. Pete Stark, Mayor Lionel J. Wilson, President George H. W. Bush, and Rep. George Miller inspect Cypress Street Viaduct damage.

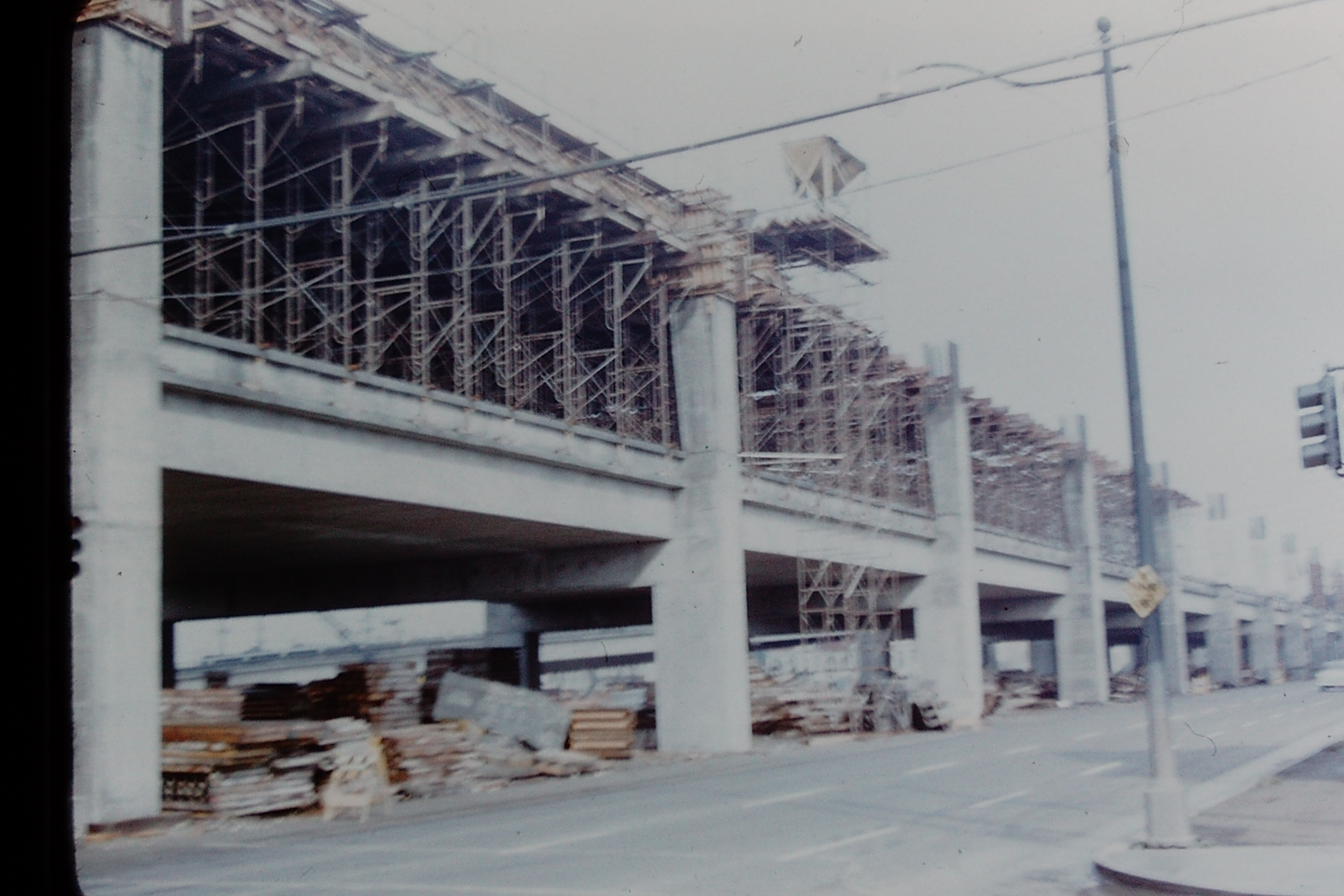
Under construction February 8, 1957

== Similar structures damaged by earthquakes ==
- Alaskan Way Viaduct
- Central Freeway
- Embarcadero Freeway
- Hanshin Expressway

== See also ==
- Interstate 280 (California) – the only remaining double-decked freeway entirely over land in the Bay Area.
