= California State Route 130 =

Highway in California

State Route 130

- Map of SR 130, with the western portion under state maintenance highlighted in red, and the eastern segment maintained at the county level in purple

Route information
- Maintained by Caltrans, Santa Clara County, Stanislaus County
- Length: 69.200 mi (111.367 km): 22.503 mi (36.215 km)—State maintained section; 46.697 mi (75.152 km)—County maintained section

State maintained section
- West end: Alum Rock Avenue at the eastern city limits of San Jose
- East end: San Antonio Valley Road at the Lick Observatory on Mount Hamilton

Signed county maintained section
- West end: Mount Hamilton Road at the Lick Observatory on Mount Hamilton
- East end: Santa Clara–Stanislaus county line

Unsigned county maintained section
- West end: Santa Clara–Stanislaus county line
- Major intersections: I-5 near Patterson
- East end: SR 33 in Patterson

Location
- Country: United States
- State: California
- Counties: Santa Clara, Stanislaus

Highway system
- State highways in California; Interstate; US; State; Scenic; History; Pre‑1964; Unconstructed; Deleted; Freeways
← SR 129	→ SR 131

State Route 130 (SR 130) is a state highway in Santa Clara County, California that connects San Jose with the Lick Observatory on Mount Hamilton. The highway follows Mount Hamilton Road, a narrow two-lane highway that goes through the Diablo Range. Though some signs and maps may continue to mark a portion of Alum Rock Avenue through San Jose west to U.S. Route 101 as part of SR 130, control of the segment of the highway within San Jose's borders was relinquished to the city and is thus no longer officially part of the state highway system. Some signs and maps may also mark SR 130 as extending east, according to its legislative definition, to Patterson in Stanislaus County, but the traversable route via San Antonio Valley Road and Del Puerto Canyon Road is maintained at the county level and has not yet been formally adopted by the California Department of Transportation (Caltrans).

== Route description ==
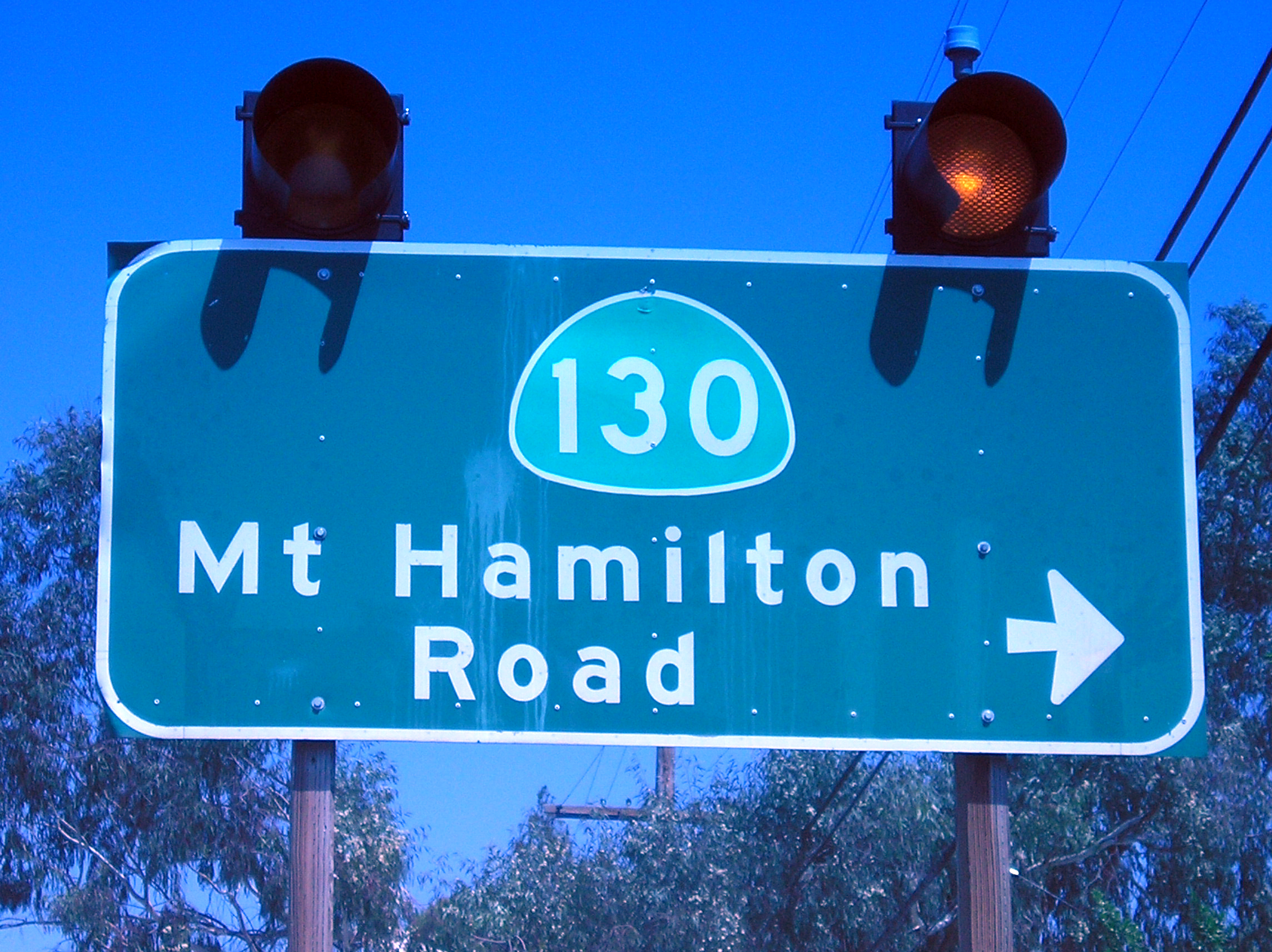
Route 130 sign leading to Mount Hamilton Road

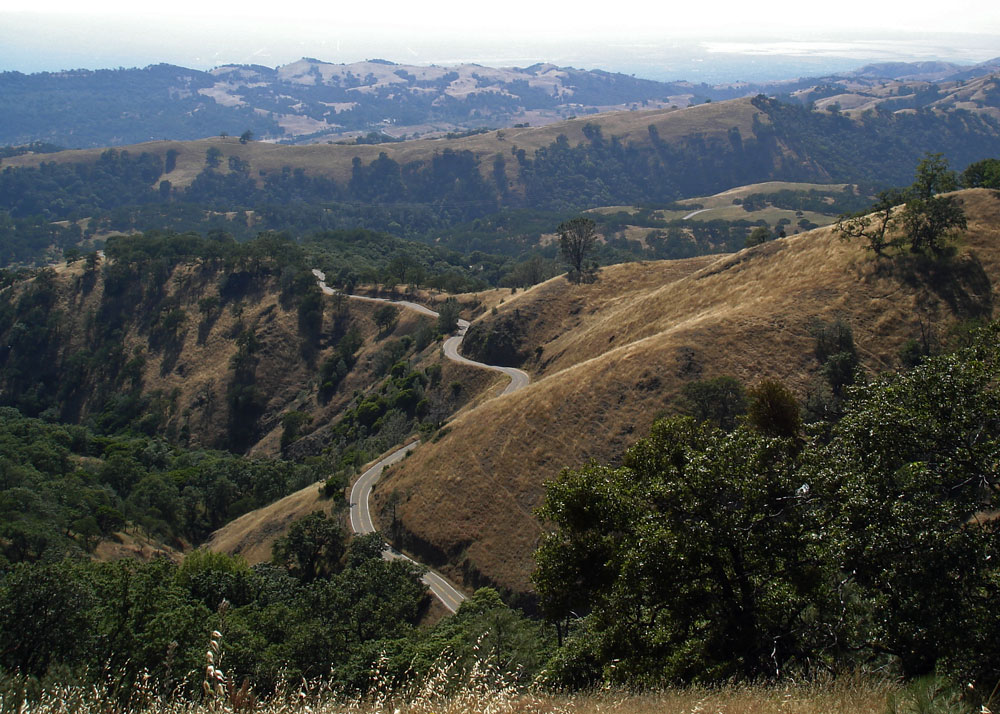
Route 130 winding around the Diablo Range

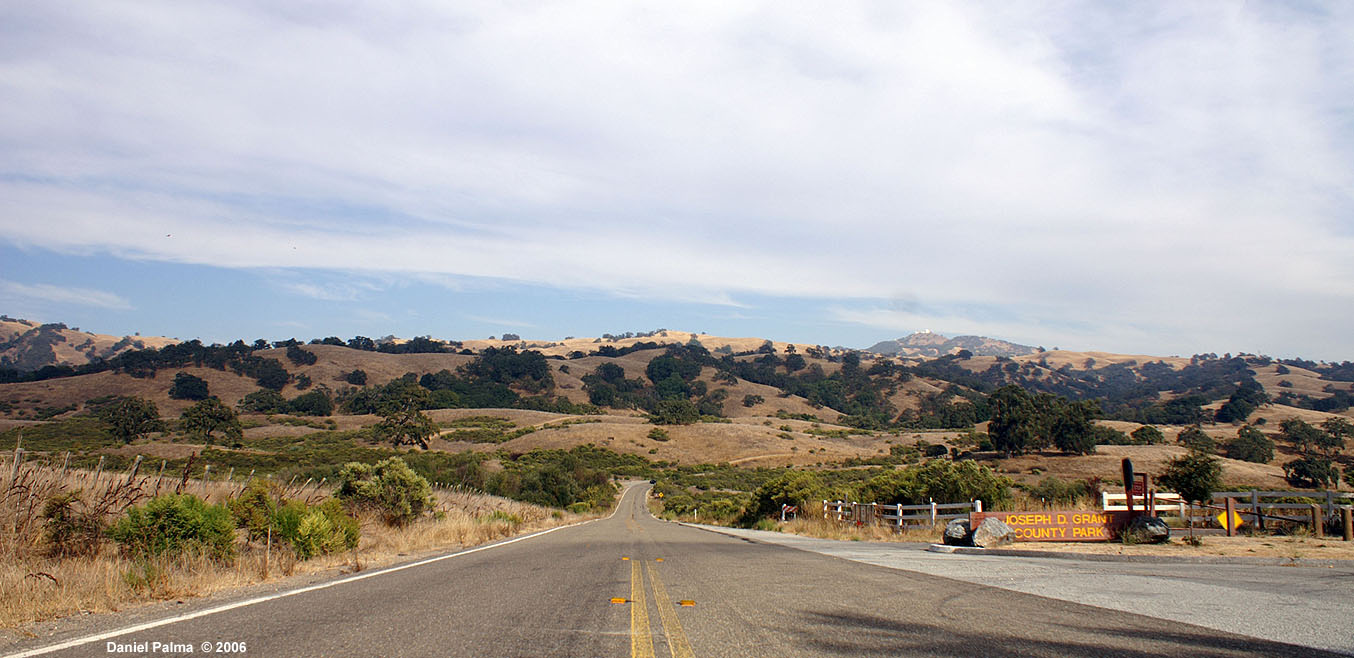
Route 130 at the foot of the Diablo Range looking towards Mount Hamilton and the Lick Observatory

Route 130 is defined in section 430, subdivision (a), of the California Streets and Highways Code, and that the highway is "from the eastern city limit of the City of San Jose near Manning Avenue to Route 33 near Patterson via the vicinity of Mount Hamilton". While control of the former portion of Route 130 between Route 101 and San Jose's eastern border has been relinquished by the state to the city, subdivision (b) further mandates that the city must still "maintain within its jurisdiction signs directing motorists to the continuation of Route 130".

Starting at San Jose's eastern border, SR 130 heads east up into the mountains along Mount Hamilton Road, offering vistas of San Jose and the Santa Clara Valley, and traveling through some of the last remaining ranch and naturally wild land in Santa Clara County as well as Joseph D. Grant County Park. As SR 130 approaches the base of Mount Hamilton itself, the road narrows further and is barely capable of supporting two cars abreast. The narrow road begins a series of tight switchbacks that culminate on the summit of Mount Hamilton at the Lick Observatory. The observatory also serves as the existing route's eastern terminus at around 4,200 ft. (1,280 m) elevation. When snow falls on the higher elevations of the road, it is closed until crews can clear the snow and black ice. There is a small community in this area.

Although state maintenance of SR 130 ends at this point, the road continues east of the Lick Observatory as the county road San Antonio Valley Road. San Antonio Valley Road terminates at the intersection of Mines Road (to Livermore) and Del Puerto Canyon Road, which the latter eventually leads to Interstate 5 and Patterson. It consists of one to two lanes, and may be considered a part of SR 130 by the state in the future. The County of Santa Clara has posted SR 130 markers along the section it controls, but the route within Stanislaus County remains totally unsigned by either the state or the county there.

A portion of SR 130 in San Jose is part of the National Highway System, a network of highways that are considered essential to the country's economy, defense, and mobility by the Federal Highway Administration.

== History ==
SR 130 did not exist as a state highway before 1964; however, the roads it travels had existed since Lick Observatory was built. Legislatively, SR 130 continues for 30 additional miles (48 km) east of Lick Observatory to State Route 33 in Patterson through the San Antonio Valley. East of the Lick Observatory, the road is maintained by the county rather than the state, and therefore this portion of the state highway remains technically unbuilt.

However, the County of Santa Clara has posted small SR 130 markers along the traversable route, including where San Antonio Canyon Road begins east of the Lick Observatory entrance, the intersection of San Antonio and Del Puerto Canyon Roads. and at the Stanislaus County line. Thus, Google Maps and other map services may acknowledge SR 130 existing east of the Mt. Hamilton summit all the way to SR 33 in Patterson.

Prior to 2011, the official western terminus of SR 130 was at U.S. Route 101 (US 101) in San Jose. SR 130 then proceeded along Alum Rock Avenue, over a junction with Interstate 680 (I-680), and through San Jose's Alum Rock neighborhood. Though some maps and signs may still mark this segment as part of SR 130, the California State Legislature relinquished control of this segment of the highway to the city, and SR 130 now officially begins at the eastern city limits of San Jose.

== Future ==
Money had been set aside by the state to study the feasibility of turning part of SR 130's legislative route from San Antonio Valley Road east to Interstate 5 into a freeway. This was intended to facilitate traffic between the Santa Clara Valley and the Central Valley; the former is experiencing population growth and real estate development. The project's main proponent was former United States Representative Richard Pombo, who was the House Resources Committee chair when in Congress and himself a member of a family with extensive Central Valley property holdings near the proposed freeway's path.

The proposed freeway's path west of San Antonio Valley Road would have bypassed Mount Hamilton either to the north toward State Route 237 or to the south toward San Jose's Evergreen district. The feasibility of the project came into question, however, as constructing a freeway over the Diablo Range near three of its highest peaks (Mount Hamilton included) would have been very difficult. The project also faced stiff opposition from taxpayers, environmentalists, residents of the area looking to preserve their area's local charm, and the Lick Observatory (A freeway through the mountains near the observatory would render it useless by light pollution). The freeway plan was quietly abandoned after Congressman Pombo failed in his reelection bid in 2006.

== Major intersections ==
Except where prefixed with a letter, postmiles were measured on the road as it was in 1964, based on the alignment that existed at the time, and do not necessarily reflect current mileage. Postmile prefixes include: R reflecting a realignment in the route since then, M indicating a second realignment, L referring to an overlap due to a correction or change, and T indicating postmiles classified as temporary. Segments that remain unconstructed or have been relinquished to local control may be omitted. The entire route is in Santa Clara County.

Location	Postmile	Destinations	Notes
San Jose	0.00 (Note: Postmiles are measured from SR 130's original western end at US 101 before that segment within San Jose was deleted and relinquished to local control.)	US 101 (Bayshore Freeway) – Los Angeles, San Francisco	Interchange; west end of SR 130; US 101 exit 386A; road continues as Santa Clara Street
San Jose	1.35	I-680 (Sinclair Freeway) – Sacramento, San Jose	Interchange; I-680 exit 2A
San Jose		West end of state maintenance at the San Jose city limit	
Lick Observatory	22.50	San Antonio Valley Road – Livermore, Patterson	East end of SR 130 and state maintenance
1.000 mi = 1.609 km; 1.000 km = 0.621 mi

=== Mount Hamilton to Patterson ===
This junction list consists of the county-maintained, Mount Hamilton-to-Patterson route that has not yet been formally adopted by Caltrans. There are no postmiles maintained by the state.

County	Location	mi	km	Destinations	Notes
Santa Clara	Lick Observatory			SR 130 west (Mount Hamilton Road) – San Jose	West end of San Antonio Valley Road
Santa Clara	San Antonio Valley			Mines Road – Livermore	East end of San Antonio Valley Road; west end of Del Puerto Canyon Road
Stanislaus				Diablo Grande Parkway west	East end of Del Puerto Canyon Road
Stanislaus				I-5 (West Side Freeway) – Los Angeles, San Francisco, Sacramento	Interchange; east end of Diablo Grande Parkway; west end of Sperry Avenue and CR J17 overlap; I-5 exit 434
Stanislaus	Patterson			SR 33 / CR J17 – Westley, Turlock, Crows Landing	East end; road continues to South 1st Street; east end of CR J17 overlap
1.000 mi = 1.609 km; 1.000 km = 0.621 mi
