= CA129 =

CA129 can refer to:

- Air China Flight 129
- California State Route 129
