= California State Route 85 =

Highway in California

State Route 85
- West Valley Freeway
- SR 85 highlighted in red

Route information
- Maintained by Caltrans
- Length: 24.2 mi (38.9 km)
- Existed: July 1, 1964–present
- History: SR 9 in 1934, SR 85 in 1964
- Restrictions: No trucks over 4.5 tons from US 101 (South) to Stevens Creek Boulevard

Major junctions
- South end: US 101 in San Jose
- SR 87 in San Jose; SR 17 in Los Gatos; I-280 in Cupertino; SR 82 in Mountain View; SR 237 in Mountain View
- North end: US 101 in Mountain View

Location
- Country: United States
- State: California
- Counties: Santa Clara

Highway system
- State highways in California; Interstate; US; State; Scenic; History; Pre‑1964; Unconstructed; Deleted; Freeways
← SR 84	→ SR 86

State Route 85 (SR 85) is a state highway which connects the cities of southern San Jose and Mountain View in the U.S. state of California. At a length of 24.2 miles (38.9 km), the route serves as a bypass of U.S. Route 101 (US 101) in the Santa Clara Valley area, running through the foothill cities of Los Gatos, Saratoga, Cupertino, roughly paralleling the Santa Cruz Mountains up to an interchange with Interstate 280 (I-280). The highway also intersects with SR 87, SR 17, and SR 237.

SR 85 is officially known as the West Valley Freeway along its entire length. A significant portion of the route is also signed as the Norman Y. Mineta Highway, after former San Jose Mayor, U.S. Congressman, Secretary of Commerce, and Secretary of Transportation Norman Mineta. The northernmost segment between I-280 and US 101, paralleling the Stevens Creek, also is known as the Stevens Creek Freeway.

SR 85 was built in two phases: the first, comprising the northern half, runs 5.7 miles (9.2 km) from Stevens Creek Boulevard near I-280 to its northern terminus at US 101 in Mountain View, was built in the 1960s. The second half, running 18.5 miles (29.8 km) from US 101 in southern San Jose to Stevens Creek Boulevard in Cupertino, remained unbuilt until the 1990s, and was opened in segments between 1991 and 1994. Prior to the construction of the freeway, the route was signed along Mathilda Avenue and De Anza Boulevard from US 101 near SR 237 southwards until its junction with SR 9 in Saratoga, which then served as its southern terminus until it was decommissioned the same day the freeway opened.

== Route description ==
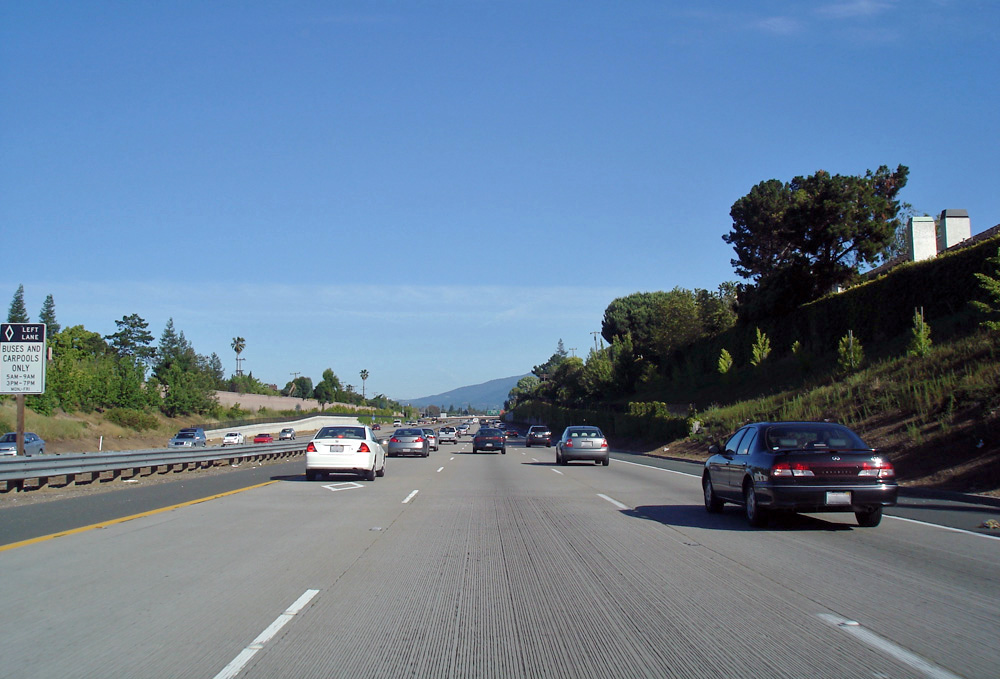
SR 85 through much of Saratoga and Los Gatos is a sunken highway.

SR 85 covers a length of 24.2 miles (38.9 km) and is built to freeway standards in its entirety. It is defined in Section 385 of the California Streets and Highways Code (SHC) as Route 85, and that the highway is "from Route 101 near Bernal Road in San Jose to Route 101 near Moffett Boulevard in Mountain View."

SR 85 begins at an interchange with US 101 and heads due west through San Jose. Near the Westfield Oakridge Mall in San Jose, SR 85 has an interchange with the southern terminus of the SR 87 freeway, which provides access to the San Jose International Airport. SR 85 continues west into Los Gatos, where it intersects the SR 17 freeway. SR 85 briefly enters Campbell and reenters San Jose before crossing into Saratoga. It turns northwest and briefly reenters San Jose before entering Cupertino and passing right next to De Anza College. SR 85 then interchanges with I-280 before briefly entering Sunnyvale and Los Altos and then entering Mountain View, where it first intersects SR 237 before terminating at US 101 near the Ames Research Center.

SR 85 has several points of interest. The northern terminus is located near Moffett Field, as well as Google's main campus and Microsoft's Silicon Valley Campus. Near the interchange with I-280, SR 85 runs close to Apple Park—the headquarters of Apple Inc.—and next to De Anza College, as well as the same-named West Valley College, both community colleges in the area. Near the SR 17 interchange, SR 85 runs next to the headquarters of Netflix in Los Gatos. The VTA light rail service's Blue Line runs in the median of SR 85 between the SR 85/SR 87 interchange and its southern terminus, as well as below it in Mountain View.

This route is part of the California Freeway and Expressway System and is part of the National Highway System, a network of highways that are considered essential to the country's economy, defense, and mobility by the Federal Highway Administration. In 2014, SR 85 had an annual average daily traffic (AADT) of 58,000 at Bernal Road, and 129,500 at SR 87, the latter of which was the highest AADT for the highway.

=== Truck ban ===
The cities along the proposed route also pushed to prohibit trucks over 4.5 short tons (4.1 t; 4.0 long tons) from using SR 85 (similar to the I-580 truck ban in Oakland and SR 2 truck ban in Angeles National Forest). Thus, SR 85 became one of several California freeways that do not allow such tractor semis. The restriction is legally in effect from SR 85's southern terminus at US 101 to I-280 (exit 19B), although signage does permit southbound trucks to travel further to Stevens Creek Boulevard (exit 18). This ban has been a primary factor in reducing noise levels that the freeway would otherwise produce, as most large trucks are unable to use the freeway.

=== HOV and HOT lanes ===
High-occupancy vehicle (HOV) lanes run along most of SR 85 and require a minimum of two occupants per vehicle during peak hours on weekdays, between 5:00 and 9:00 in the morning, and 3:00 and 7:00 in the evening. Outside of these hours, the lanes are open to all vehicles without restriction.

In the 2010s, the Santa Clara Valley Transportation Authority (VTA) developed plans to convert SR 85's HOV lanes into high-occupancy toll (HOT) lanes as part of the Silicon Valley Express Lanes Program. The proposed conversion would allow single-occupant vehicles to use the lanes for a toll, while preserving free access for high-occupancy vehicles. Early community concerns included environmental impacts and potential conflicts with a 1989 agreement reserving the freeway median for future mass transit, leading to lawsuits from several cities along the path of the freeway.

Construction of the first segment—between Central Expressway and the northern terminus of SR 85 at US 101—began in fall 2020 and opened in February 2022. A second, non-contiguous segment—between SR 87 and the southern terminus of SR 85 at US 101—began construction in June 2025 and is scheduled to open in late 2028. Both segments repurpose existing direct connector ramps linking SR 85 and US 101. Long-term plans call for connecting these segments, with environmental clearance already secured but no set timeline.

As of January 2026, the HOT lanes' hours of operation is weekdays between 5:00 a.m. and 8:00 p.m.; they are otherwise free and open to all vehicles at other times. Solo drivers are tolled using a congestion pricing system based on the real-time levels of traffic. Two-person carpools are charged 50 percent of the posted toll. Carpools with three or more people and motorcycles are not charged. All tolls are collected using an open road tolling system, and therefore there are no toll booths to receive cash. Each vehicle using the HOT lanes is required to carry a FasTrak Flex transponder with its switch set to indicate the number of the vehicle's occupants (1, 2, or 3+). Solo drivers may also use the FasTrak standard tag without the switch. Drivers without any FasTrak tag will be assessed a toll violation regardless of whether they qualified for free.

== History ==
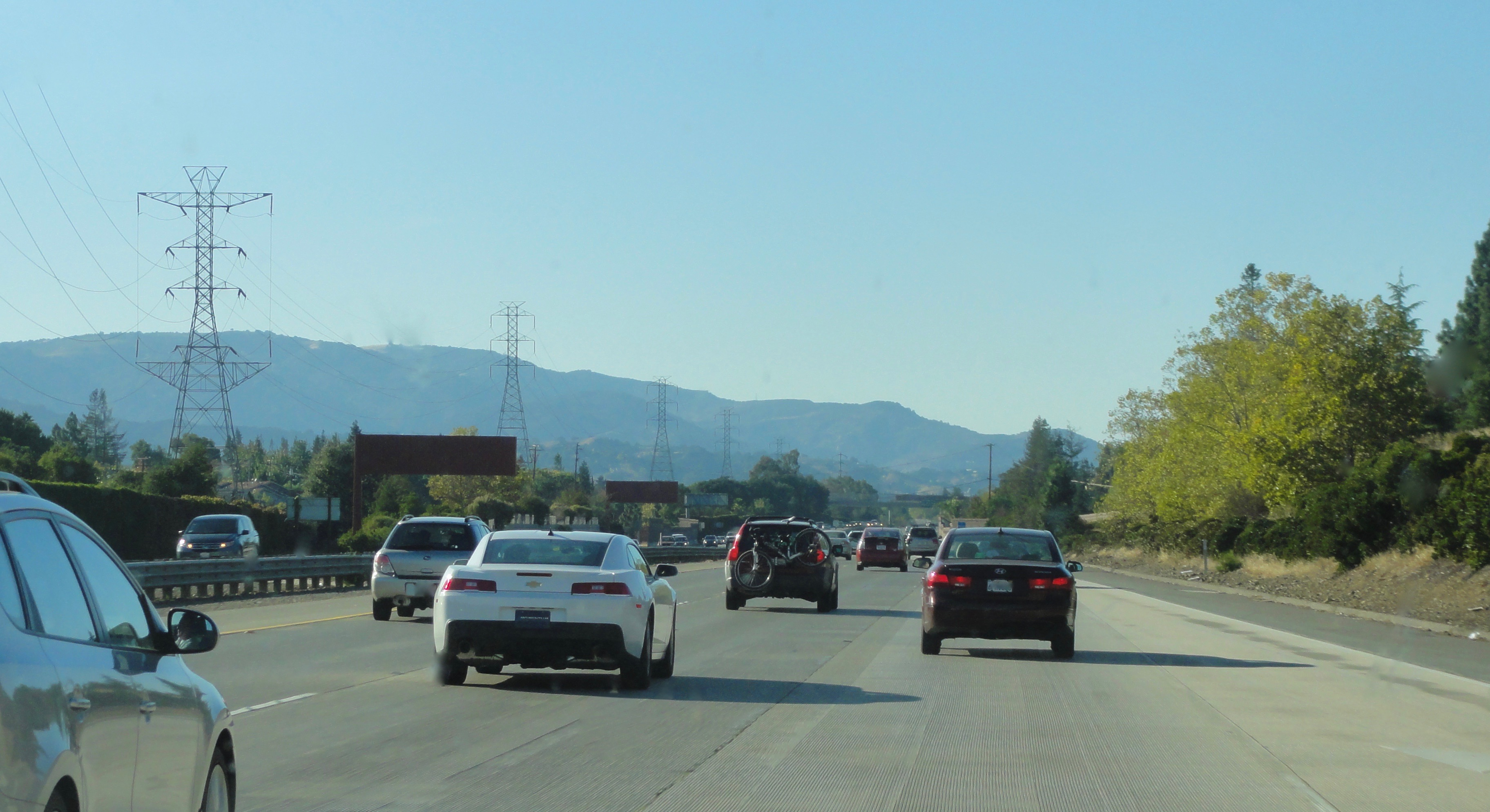
SR 85 in Los Gatos

=== Preserving the right-of-way ===
Land was set aside for the entire freeway in the 1950s, with maps first showing the proposed freeway in 1957. At the time, Santa Clara County still largely a rural area, consisting of orchards, and so the right-of-way touched very few existing structures. During Governor Jerry Brown's tenure in the 1970s, the building of highways was de-emphasized in favor of mass transit, and some building was allowed on the right-of-way with the expectation that the freeway would never be built. Local government officials, however, fought to preserve the right-of-way and succeeded in doing so. As a result, when congestion on other freeways—I-280, US 101, and SR 17—intersecting this path became overwhelming, it was still possible for this freeway to be built with little demolition required.

In the interim, parts of the unused open space were leased for use without permanent structures, including a large tree nursery, a driving range, and among other things, overflow parking for De Anza College.

=== Historic and original alignments ===
State Route 9
- Location: Fremont–Santa Cruz
- Existed: 1934–1963 north of SR 17

State Route 85
- Location: Mountain View–Saratoga
- Existed: 1963–1994 south of I-280

State Route 9 originally extended from its current terminus to Mission San Jose along present-day SR 85, SR 237, I-680, SR 262, and SR 238. When the San Jose-Oakland US 101E designation was dropped in 1935, Route 5 between Mission San Jose (where the new SR 21 turned northeast) and Hayward did not retain a signed designation. Later SR 9 was extended north along SR 17 (which had replaced SR 13) from Milpitas to Warm Springs, SR 21 to Mission San Jose, and the independent section of former US 101E - all part of Route 5 - to US 50 (also Route 5, which included a branch to Oakland) near Hayward. Except for a short realignment in the mid-1950s onto Route 69 (now I-880 and SR 262) between Milpitas and Warm Springs, this alignment remained until the 1964 renumbering when SR 9 would eventually be truncated to its existing terminus in Los Gatos.

From 1963 to 1965, SR 85 was a 10-mile highway that entirely on surface streets from US 101 near SR 237 to I-280 along Mathilda Ave and Saratoga-Sunnyvale Road (a portion of which was later renamed De Anza Blvd) while the current freeway was being planned. The northern segment was rerouted in 1965 once the northern segment of the freeway opened. The southern segment was deleted in 1994 on the same day the remainder of the current freeway opened.

=== Funding and planning ===
The town of Los Gatos and city of Saratoga added to the complexity and cost of the planning and implementation; to avoid excessive noise, they insisted that the freeway be built below grade (at an eventual additional cost of US$60 million), that it have only three lanes in each direction: the leftmost lane being a HOV lane, and two lanes carrying standard traffic. In addition, to prevent what they felt would be excessive additional traffic on their surface streets, they lobbied heavily to prevent having any freeway entrances or exits in their cities. Full interchanges were originally planned at Winchester Boulevard, Quito Road, Saratoga Avenue, and Prospect Road; the final compromise placed only a half interchange at Winchester and completely did away with the Quito and Prospect interchanges. As a result, backups at entrances to the freeway near these cities are tremendous during morning rush hour, and Los Gatos and Campbell residents who want to take 85 southward must go two or three miles (3 to 5 km) out of their way to find a ramp onto the freeway.

The project was the first in the state for which county residents voted to tax themselves to build a state highway. Because state funds were scarce and congestion on other freeways and on surrounding surface streets was tremendous, a slight majority of voters (56%) voted for the tax in 1984. At the time, there was considerable controversy over whether funds would be better spent on mass transit and whether a freeway through so many residential areas would destroy the quality of life. The total US$785 million cost of the freeway was mostly funded by the special tax on county residents, along with matching state and federal funds. The project proved successful enough that, since then, many other locales have used local taxes to build state projects. It was also so effective as a solution to traffic problems that, several years after it was built, a poll by the Silicon Valley Manufacturing Group revealed that nearly 80% of voters claimed that they had voted for the tax.

=== Construction of the freeway ===
The northern section, from Stevens Creek Boulevard in Cupertino to US 101 at Mountain View, was completed and opened on 8 December 1965 as four lanes (I-280 was not complete north of SR 85 up to SR 92 until a few years later so certain ramps remained closed until the 1970s). The northern section's carpool lanes were completed in 1990 (south half) and 1998 (north half). In the southern section, partial fill for the interchanges at Blossom Hill Road and SR 87 was placed in 1986. Construction of the first structures (at the SR 85/87 and SR 85/Stevens Creek interchanges) broke ground on April 20, 1988. During the Loma Prieta Earthquake in 1989, these segments, along with the other segments under construction, were spared major damage despite being approximately 10 miles north of the epicenter. SR 85 opened between Santa Teresa Boulevard (at the future 85/87 interchange) and Cottle Road in 1991 with only 2 lanes in each direction, along with the light rail line in the median of SR 85. The extensions to Almaden Expressway and Great Oaks Boulevard were completed in 1992. With the completion of the southern leg (from I-280 to 85) of SR 87 in 1993, the 85/87 interchange opened to traffic that year (with only two connector ramps, from 85 north to 87 north and 87 south to 85 south, due to funding limitations). The HOV lanes were painted on this segment in April 1994. The remaining segments, from US 101 (in South San Jose) to Great Oaks and from Almaden Expressway to I-280, opened in August 1994 and October 1994 respectively. The projects completed in the 1990s had a total cost of about $785 million.

The remaining ramps at the SR 85/87 interchange (from 85 south to 87 north and 87 south to 85 north) were completed in 2003. Before these ramps were constructed, travelers had to use Santa Teresa Boulevard (which 87 turned into at its southern terminus) to join 85 north; similarly, travelers on 85 south had to exit at Santa Teresa Boulevard in order to access 87. At the southern SR 85/101 interchange in South San Jose, carpool-to-carpool ramps and the south 101 to north 85 connector ramp were opened in 2004. The $125 million reconstruction of the northern Highway 85/101 interchange in Mountain View, with the original ramps (opened in 1965) replaced and new carpool-to-carpool and other ramps added, was completed in 2006. The projects completed in the 2000s had a total cost of about $237 million.

When the SR 17/85 interchange was built in the early 1990s, Caltrans built a tunnel that was to carry traffic from north 17 to north 85, similar to the tunnel that carries traffic from south 17 to south 85. But due to insufficient funds, the second tunnel was sealed at both ends by the dirt embankment, with a loop ramp provided instead.

Unfortunately, large sections of the freeway had to be repainted prior to opening, due to graffiti. The segment from Santa Teresa Boulevard to US 101 in South San Jose was further repaved in 2011 (Northbound) and 2018 (Southbound).

Like most California urban freeways at the time it was built, SR 85 originally used a mix of nonreflective and reflective raised pavement markers (i.e., Botts dots and Stimsonite reflectors) to mark lanes. After California phased out Botts' dots (leaving Stimsonite reflectors as the only kind of raised pavement marker) and transitioned to wider lane stripes, the freeway was repainted to the new standard in late 2019 (similar to I-15 in Cajon Pass).

=== Aftermath of the freeway ===
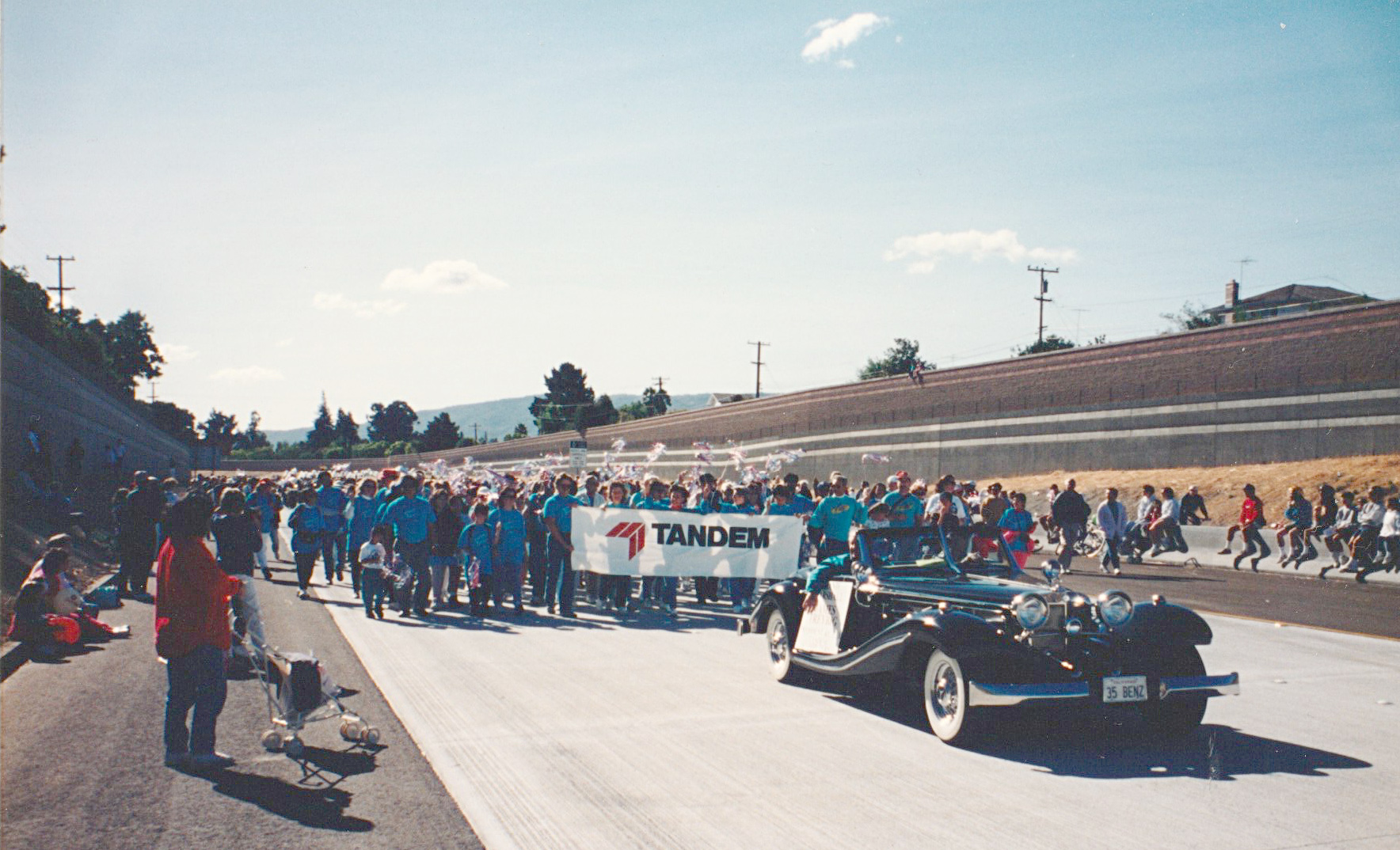
The 1994 "Party on the Freeway" and parade in Cupertino, near the I-280 interchange, with nearby Tandem Computers marching behind a classic car

In October 1994, the completed freeway between Almaden Expressway and I-280 opened with the "Party on the Freeway", a single day on which only pedestrians and bicyclists were allowed to travel its length. The evening before opening day several cities along the route, including Saratoga and Campbell, held street fair events on the freeway featuring fine food, wine, and games. Limo service was offered linking the different cities' fairs, giving locals their first glimpse of the new freeway. The next morning 85 was officially opened to traffic. The city of Campbell had planted a large display of pansies spelling out the city's name on the sloped side of the freeway bed; this caused a traffic jam as motorists slowed to read the message. The flowers were removed after the first day. The route has had a speed limit of 65 MPH since 1996.

The overall commute for people from south San Jose through Campbell into Mountain View and other business areas of Silicon Valley improved by roughly half an hour over previous longer routes on already crowded freeways or over miles of surface streets. Major surface streets that had once been unnavigable during many hours of the day suddenly became—and remained—usable. For example, eastern Blossom Hill Road had a typical load of 23,000 cars a day before 85 opened; as of 2004, a typical day's load was a mere 11,000 cars. (Conversely, Saratoga Avenue, which previously had been a fairly quiet road, now sees about 18,000 cars a day because it is the only interchange in or near the city of Saratoga.)

As with any freeway, ambient noise in surrounding neighborhoods increased, from a steadily annoying whisper of sound day and night to a dull roar that muted backyard conversations. Property values, however, did not diminish; it is possible that the improved commute and access to the vast California freeway network improved the desirability of these neighborhoods. The noise level, however, has continued to be an issue with some residents, particularly in Saratoga. Caltrans has floated several options from repaving with asphalt, to grinding down the current concrete surface of the highway. An experimental length of the freeway from Cox Avenue to De Anza Boulevard was ground down in 2003. This smoothed out much of the top layer of the freeway removing most of the rain grooves that had been cut in the concrete when the highway was first built. The result did lower the ambient sound levels along that stretch of the freeway, and subsequently, the entire concrete surfaced section of the freeway from Almaden Expressway to Stevens Creek Boulevard was microgrooved in a follow-up project in 2005.

=== Other unique features and events ===
Besides the funding breakthrough, SR 85 set new standards in two additional areas: metering lights and median safety barriers.

SR 85 was the first freeway in California to open with metering lights at every onramp, including interchanges with SR 17 and US 101. When the freeway opened on October 19, 1994, the lights caused tremendous backups at the onramps during commute hours, raising an outcry from commuters furious at having to wait as much as 20 to 30 minutes in the worst cases before entering the freeway. The county required Caltrans to turn off the metering lights, which they did on November 17, 1994. This almost immediately slowed the commute over the full 24 mile (39 km) stretch by 33 minutes; Caltrans eventually turned the lights back on in 1995, which sped up the overall commute considerably.

In January 2009, several metering lights in the southern portion of SR 85 were reactivated. These included the SR 87-to-SR 85 interchange, the Almaden Expressway on-ramps, and the Blossom Hill Road on-ramps.

From 1994 to 1996, the speed limit on the freeway was 55 MPH. It was one of the first urban freeways to receive a 65 MPH speed limit in 1996.

The freeway was constructed with a 46-to-50-foot (14–15 m) wide center median. Initially, no barrier of any kind was installed in the median because, at the time, Caltrans regulations stated that any median wider than 45 feet (14 m) did not require a median barrier unless there was a history of head-on collisions. Public outcry convinced Caltrans to install the standard post-and-metal-beam barrier the entire length of the freeway and also to change their regulations so that median barriers are now required on all high-volume freeways with medians of less than 75 feet (23 m). Accidents and injuries dropped by roughly one-third in the first year after the barrier was installed.

In 1998, California Highway Patrol officer Scott Greenly was struck by a car and killed while issuing a ticket on the shoulder of Route 85; thereafter the portion between Quito Road and Prospect Road in the City of Saratoga was named the CHP Officer Scott M. Greenly Memorial Freeway. On September 15, 2008, the remainder of the freeway, north of Prospect Road as well as south of Quito Road, was named in honor of former San Jose mayor, congressman, and United States Secretary of Transportation Norman Mineta.

== Exit list ==
The entire route is in Santa Clara County.

Location	mi	km	Exit	Destinations	Notes
San Jose	0.00	0.00	1A	US 101 south – Los Angeles	Access to US 101 north via exit 1B; south end of SR 85; US 101 north exit 377A, south exit 377B
San Jose	0.00	0.00	♦	US 101 south – Los Angeles	HOV access only; southbound exit and northbound entrance; Future Express Lane connector
San Jose			—	SR 85 Express Lanes (southern segment)	South end of express lanes-under construction; scheduled to open in 2028
San Jose	0.18	0.29	1B	Bernal Road to US 101 north – San Francisco	Southbound exit and northbound entrance
San Jose	0.79	1.27	1C	Great Oaks Boulevard	Southbound exit and northbound entrance
San Jose	1.97	3.17	2	Cottle Road	
San Jose	3.93	6.32	4	Blossom Hill Road (CR G10)	
San Jose	5.22	8.40	5A	SR 87 north (Guadalupe Freeway) – Downtown San Jose	Southbound exit and northbound entrance added in 2003. Signed as exit 5B southbound; SR 87 exits 1A-B
San Jose	5.22	8.40	5B	Santa Teresa Boulevard	Signed as exit 5A southbound
San Jose	5.22	8.40	—	SR 85 Express Lanes (southern segment)	North end of express lanes-under construction; scheduled to open in 2028
San Jose	6.14	9.88	6	Almaden Expressway (CR G8)	
San Jose	8.11	13.05	8	Camden Avenue	
San Jose	9.28	14.93	9	Union Avenue	
Los Gatos	10.23	16.46	10	Bascom Avenue, Los Gatos Boulevard	Northbound entrance cannot access SR 17; southbound exit cannot be accessed from SR 17
Los Gatos	10.50	16.90	11A	SR 17 – Santa Cruz, San Jose	Signed as exit 11 northbound; SR 17 exit 22
Los Gatos	11.00	17.70	11B	Winchester Boulevard	Southbound exit and northbound entrance
Saratoga	13.68	22.02	14	Saratoga Avenue	
San Jose	15.87	25.54	16	De Anza Boulevard	Former SR 85
Cupertino	17.67	28.44	18	Stevens Creek Boulevard	Southbound trucks over 9,000 lbs. must exit, northbound entrance can access I-280; was South end of freeway from 1965-1994
Cupertino	18.45	29.69	19A	I-280 (Junipero Serra Freeway) – San Jose, San Francisco	Signed as exit 19 northbound; I-280 exits 12A-B
Cupertino	18.86	30.35	19B	Homestead Road	Southbound exit and northbound entrance
Sunnyvale–Los Altos line	19.86	31.96	20	Fremont Avenue	
Mountain View	21.75	35.00	22A	SR 82 south (El Camino Real) – Sunnyvale	Signed as exit 22B southbound
Mountain View	21.75	35.00	22B	SR 82 north (El Camino Real) – Mountain View	No southbound exit
Mountain View	22.16	35.66	22C	SR 237 east to US 101 south (Bayshore Freeway) – Oakland, San Jose	Northbound exit and southbound entrance; SR 237 west exit 1B
Mountain View	22.16	35.66	22A	To SR 82 north (SR 237 west) – Mountain View	Southbound exit and northbound entrance
Mountain View	22.63	36.42	23	Evelyn Avenue	Northbound exit and southbound entrance
Mountain View			—	SR 85 Express Lanes	South end of Express Lanes
Mountain View	22.63	36.42	23	Central Expressway (CR G6)	Southbound exit and northbound entrance
Mountain View	23.44	37.72	24A	Moffett Boulevard	Northbound exit and southbound entrance
Mountain View			—	SR 85 Express Lanes	Northernmost access point on mainline SR 85
Mountain View	23.87	38.42	—	US 101 Express Lanes north – San Francisco	Express Lanes access only; northbound exit and southbound entrance
Mountain View	23.87	38.42	24B	US 101 north (Bayshore Freeway) – San Francisco	No access to US 101 south; north end of SR 85; US 101 south exit 398B
Mountain View	23.87	38.42	24C	Shoreline Boulevard	Northbound exit and southbound entrance
Mountain View	1.000 mi = 1.609 km; 1.000 km = 0.621 mi: Electronic toll collection; HOV only; Incomplete access; Unopened				

== Popular culture ==
In the 2021 Netflix film The Mitchells vs. the Machines, the route is revealed to be heavily patrolled by PAL Max robots.
