= California State Route 9 =

Highway in California

State Route 9
- SR 9 highlighted in red

Route information
- Maintained by Caltrans
- Length: 38.497 mi (61.955 km)
- Existed: 1934–present
- Tourist routes: Saratoga–Los Gatos Road

Major junctions
- South end: SR 1 in Santa Cruz
- SR 236 at Boulder Creek; SR 35 at Saratoga Gap
- North end: SR 17 / CR G10 in Los Gatos

Location
- Country: United States
- State: California
- Counties: Santa Cruz, San Mateo, Santa Clara

Highway system
- State highways in California; Interstate; US; State; Scenic; History; Pre‑1964; Unconstructed; Deleted; Freeways
← I-8	→ I-10

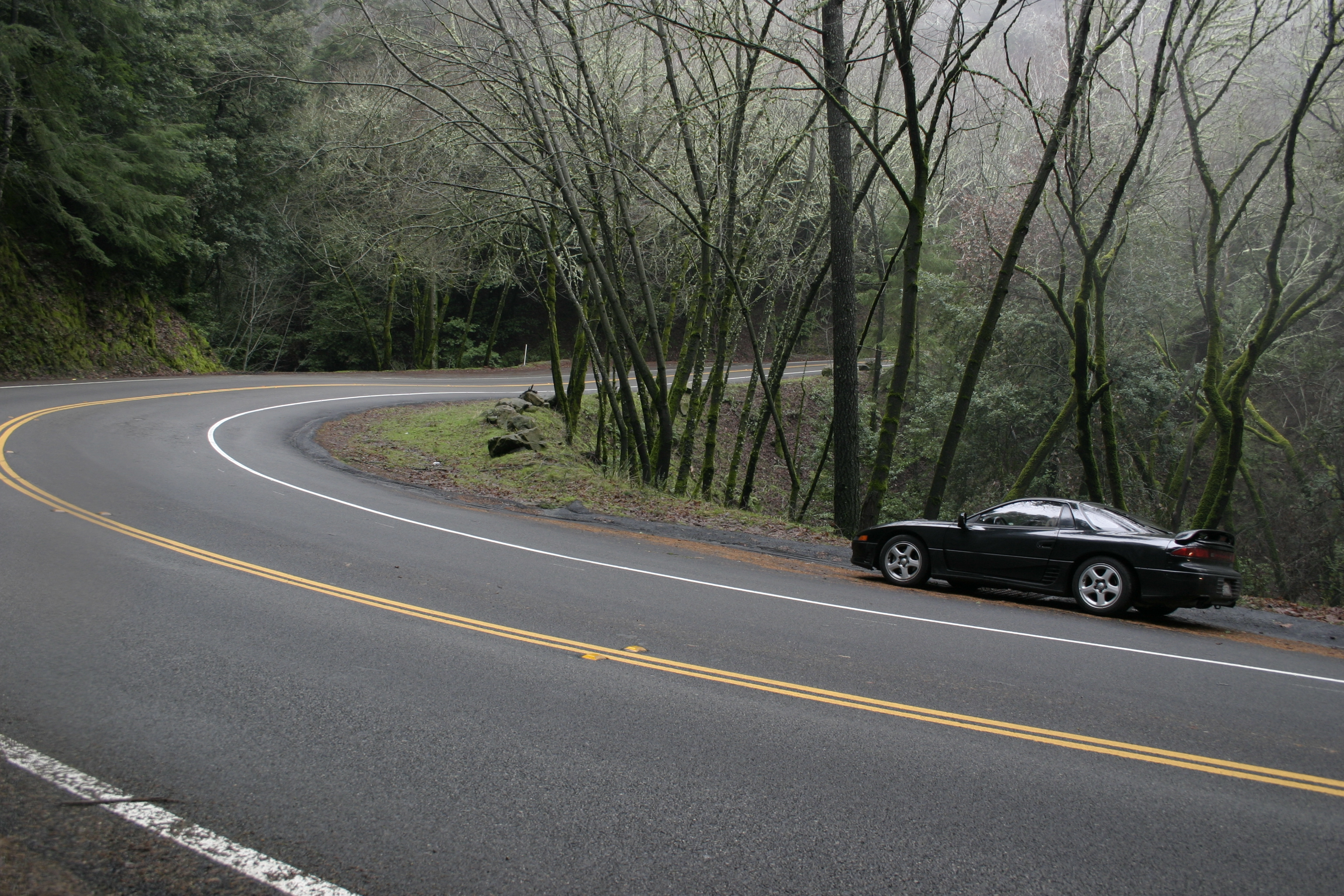
California State Route 9

State Route 9 (SR 9) is a rural and mountainous state highway in the U.S. state of California that travels 35 miles (56 km) from SR 1 in Santa Cruz to SR 17 in Los Gatos, passing through the San Lorenzo Valley and the Saratoga Gap in the Santa Cruz Mountains.

== Route description ==
Route 9 is defined in section 309 of the California Streets and Highways Code, and that the highway is "from Route 1 near Santa Cruz to Route 17 near Los Gatos via Waterman Gap and Saratoga Gap and along the ridge between the San Lorenzo and Pescadero Creeks".

SR 9 begins in the city of Santa Cruz where River Street intersects with SR 1. It heads north, paralleling the San Lorenzo River. The road is a winding two-lane road for the majority of its length until it approaches Fruitvale Avenue in Saratoga. SR 9 winds through the mountains north of Santa Cruz, passing through the communities of Paradise Park, Felton, Ben Lomond, Brookdale, and Boulder Creek, where State Route 236 departs from SR 9 to provide access to Big Basin Redwoods State Park. SR 236 later rejoins SR 9 near Castle Rock State Park.

At the summit of the Santa Cruz mountains (the junction with SR 35 and after a steep climb), there is a vista point offering a (somewhat obstructed) view of the Bay Area. The vista point is the route's highest point at around 2,608 feet (795 m). At this junction, SR 9 passes into Santa Clara County.

SR 9 descends from the mountains heading east into Saratoga as Congress Springs Road. In Saratoga, SR 9 turns southeast and becomes Saratoga-Los Gatos Road. At Fruitvale Avenue in Saratoga, SR 9 briefly becomes a four-lane highway with a large center divider. However, as the road enters Monte Sereno, it again becomes a two-lane road. This particular narrowing has caused backups in the past; however, they have become more infrequent since the completion of SR 85. SR 9 resumes being a four-lane road through downtown Los Gatos until its terminus at the junction with SR 17 (a distance of about four city blocks).

=== Usage ===
The scenic, winding segment of SR 9 in the Santa Cruz mountains is popular among car enthusiasts, motorcyclists, and bicyclists alike looking to test their skills. In particular, the section between SR 35 and SR 236 is a popular destination during the summer months for a variety of motorcycle types, with impromptu gatherings of riders in the parking lot at the SR 9-SR 35 intersection. The seven-mile (11 km) section from Saratoga Village to the Saratoga Gap is also notable for the number of bicycles climbing the hill on weekend mornings. In addition, the segment between downtown Saratoga and downtown Los Gatos has been the route for the popular "Great Race" since 1978, when over 1,000 participants run between the two towns near the end of April.

=== Classification ===
The northernmost segment of SR 9 between Saratoga-Sunnyvale Road and SR 17 in Saratoga is part of the National Highway System, a network of highways that are considered essential to the country's economy, defense, and mobility by the Federal Highway Administration. SR 9 is eligible to be included in the State Scenic Highway System, and, between the Los Gatos town limit and the intersection with SR 35, is officially a scenic highway, meaning that it is a substantial section of highway passing through a "memorable landscape" with no "visual intrusions", where the potential designation has gained popular favor with the community.

== History ==
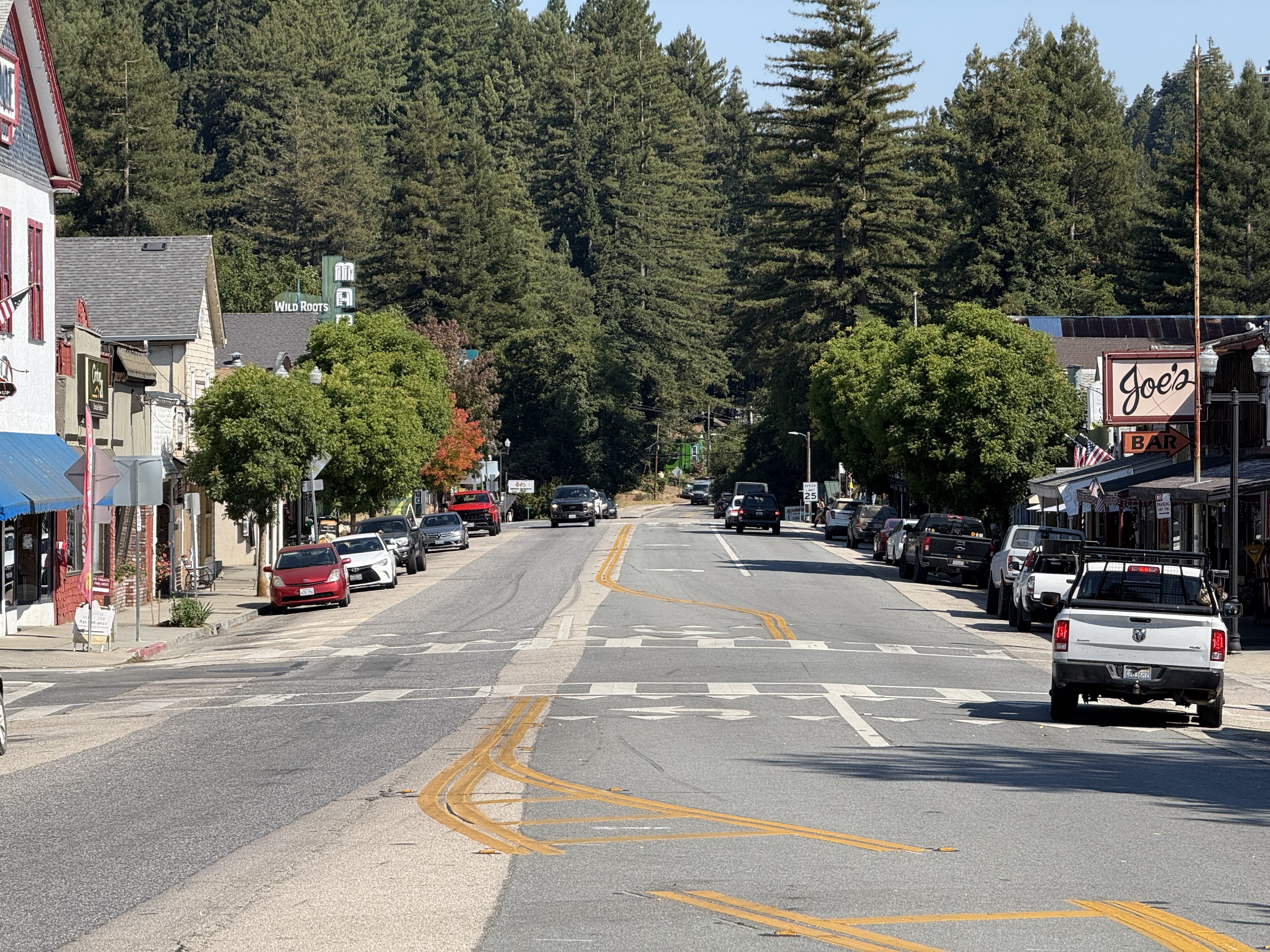
Northbound CA 9 through Boulder Creek

SR 9 was created from several previously constructed roads. One of these was a toll road built in 1848 by Martin McCarty, from near the Santa Cruz Mountains summit to Saratoga. The section from Santa Cruz to Felton also operated as a toll road, from its construction in 1860 to 1872. The Toll House, built in 1867, remains next to the highway.

In 1913, the road from Saratoga Gap southwest to Big Basin Redwoods State Park via the present SR 9 and SR 236 was added to the state highway system; it became Route 42 (an unsigned designation) in 1917. Although this highway connected to Route 44, the remainder of present SR 236, the only connection to the continuous state highway system was with the Skyline Boulevard (Route 55, now SR 35) at Saratoga Gap. This changed in 1933, when Route 42 was extended east from the gap to Route 5 (SR 17) in Los Gatos, and a new Route 116 was created, running south from Route 42 at Waterman Gap (about halfway between Saratoga Gap and the park) to Santa Cruz, intersecting the end of Route 44 at Boulder Creek.

Sign Route 9 was marked in 1934; however, it did not entirely follow the present SR 9. Initially it connected Santa Cruz with Milpitas, following Routes 116 and 42 to Saratoga, Route 114 (Saratoga Sunnyvale Road and Mathilda Avenue) north through Sunnyvale, and Route 113 (SR 237) east to Route 5 (Main Street, then U.S. Route 101E and Sign Route 13) in Milpitas. When the San Jose-Oakland US 101E designation was dropped in the mid-1930s, Route 5 between Mission San Jose (where the new SR 21 turned northeast) and Hayward did not retain a signed designation. Later SR 9 was extended north along SR 17 (which had replaced SR 13) from Milpitas to Warm Springs, SR 21 to Mission San Jose, and the independent section of former US 101E—all part of Route 5—to US 50 (also Route 5, which included a branch to Oakland) near Hayward. Except for a short realignment in the mid-1950s onto Route 69 (now I-880 and SR 262) between Milpitas and Warm Springs, this alignment remained until the 1964 renumbering.

In 1964, SR 9 was moved to its present alignment, taking over the previously unsigned Route 42 from Saratoga to Los Gatos. The route that had been signed as SR 9 became SR 85 through Sunnyvale, SR 237 to Milpitas (including previously unsigned extensions of Route 113 at each end), part of SR 17 through Warm Springs, SR 262 through Warm Springs, part of I-680 to Mission San Jose, and SR 238 from Mission San Jose to Hayward (SR 21 was already renumbered I-680 by then). SR 17 in Warm Springs was renumbered I-880 in 1984 while SR 85's original designation was deleted in 1994 and has since moved to a freeway. However, the SR 237 freeway was built in the same location, and both SR 238 and most of SR 262 remain as surface roads.

== Major intersections ==
Except where prefixed with a letter, postmiles were measured on the road as it was in 1964, based on the alignment that existed at the time, and do not necessarily reflect current mileage. Postmile prefixes include: R reflecting a realignment in the route since then, M indicating a second realignment, L referring to an overlap due to a correction or change, and T indicating postmiles classified as temporary. Segments that remain unconstructed or have been relinquished to local control may be omitted. The numbers reset at county lines; the start and end postmiles in each county are given in the county column.

County	Location	Postmile	Destinations	Notes
Santa Cruz; SCR 0.46-27.09	Santa Cruz	0.05	River Street	Continuation beyond SR 1
Santa Cruz; SCR 0.46-27.09	Santa Cruz	0.05	SR 1 – Half Moon Bay, Watsonville	South end of SR 9
Santa Cruz; SCR 0.46-27.09	Felton	6.46	Graham Hill Road, Felton Empire Road – Mount Hermon, Los Gatos, Bonny Doon	
Santa Cruz; SCR 0.46-27.09	Boulder Creek	13.04	SR 236 north (Big Basin Way) – Big Basin	
Santa Cruz; SCR 0.46-27.09	Waterman Gap	20.83	SR 236 south – Big Basin	
Santa Cruz; SCR 0.46-27.09	Saratoga Gap	27.09	SR 35 (Skyline Boulevard) – San Francisco	
Santa Clara; SCL 0.00-11.45	Saratoga	7.40	Saratoga-Sunnyvale Road, Saratoga Avenue to SR 85	Saratoga-Sunnyvale Road is former SR 85 north
Santa Clara; SCL 0.00-11.45	Los Gatos	11.06	Santa Cruz Avenue	Former SR 17
Santa Clara; SCL 0.00-11.45	Los Gatos	11.45	SR 17 – San Jose, Santa Cruz	Interchange; north end of SR 9; SR 17 exits 20A-B
Santa Clara; SCL 0.00-11.45	Los Gatos	11.45	CR G10 (Los Gatos-Saratoga Road)	Continuation beyond SR 17
1.000 mi = 1.609 km; 1.000 km = 0.621 mi
