= Tiburon Boulevard =

Highway in California

State Route 131
- Tiburon Boulevard
- Map of Marin County in western California with SR 131 highlighted in red

Route information
- Maintained by Caltrans
- Length: 4.317 mi (6.948 km)

Major junctions
- West end: US 101 in Strawberry
- East end: Main Street in Tiburon

Location
- Country: United States
- State: California
- Counties: Marin

Highway system
- State highways in California; Interstate; US; State; Scenic; History; Pre‑1964; Unconstructed; Deleted; Freeways
← SR 130	→ SR 132

State Route 131 (SR 131), named Tiburon Boulevard along its entire length, is a state highway in the U.S. state of California in Marin County. It is a short route that connects U.S. Route 101 with the town of Tiburon.

== Route description ==
Route 131 is defined in section 431, subsection (a), of the California Streets and Highways Code, and that the highway is "from Route 101 to Tiburon". Subdivision (b) permits the state to relinquish control of the segment of the highway within Tiburon's borders east of Lyford Drive to the town.

The route follows the northern and eastern shorelines of Richardson Bay, an inlet of San Francisco Bay north of Sausalito. Approximately the first half of the route is four-lane divided road, until it reaches the site of the old railroad trestle and Blackie's Pasture, after which it narrows to two lanes on Tiburon Peninsula heading into Tiburon.

Beyond its western terminus at U.S. 101, Tiburon Boulevard becomes East Blithedale Avenue, which leads into Mill Valley. Its eastern terminus is at the intersection with Main Street in Tiburon, after which the road becomes Paradise Drive, a winding route which loops around the eastern side of Tiburon Peninsula, eventually leading to Corte Madera.

SR 131 is part of the National Highway System, a network of highways that are considered essential to the country's economy, defense, and mobility by the Federal Highway Administration.

== History ==
Caltrans took over maintenance of Tiburon Boulevard and designated it as SR 131 in the 1950s; it was originally planned to be extended over a new bridge to San Francisco via Angel Island that would complement the Golden Gate Bridge.

== Major intersections ==
Except where prefixed with a letter, postmiles were measured on the road as it was in 1964, based on the alignment that existed at the time, and do not necessarily reflect current mileage. Postmile prefixes include: R reflecting a realignment in the route since then, M indicating a second realignment, L referring to an overlap due to a correction or change, and T indicating postmiles classified as temporary. Segments that remain unconstructed or have been relinquished to local control may be omitted. The entire route is in Marin County.

Location	Postmile	Destinations	Notes
Strawberry	0.00	US 101 (Redwood Highway) – Eureka, San Francisco	Interchange; west end of SR 131; US 101 exit 447; road continues as East Blithedale Avenue to Mill Valley
Tiburon	1.86	Trestle Glen Boulevard – Paradise Beach Park, San Francisco State University Romberg Tiburon Campus	
Tiburon	3.22	San Rafael Avenue - Belvedere	
Tiburon	4.39	Main Street	East end of SR 131; road continues as Paradise Drive
1.000 mi = 1.609 km; 1.000 km = 0.621 mi
