= California State Route 237 =

Highway in California

State Route 237
- Southbay Freeway
- SR 237 highlighted in red

Route information
- Maintained by Caltrans
- Length: 11 mi (18 km)
- Existed: 1934–June 30, 1964 (as SR 9); 1964 renumbering–present

Major junctions
- West end: SR 82 in Mountain View
- SR 85 in Mountain View; US 101 in Sunnyvale; I-880 in Milpitas
- East end: I-680 in Milpitas

Location
- Country: United States
- State: California
- Counties: Santa Clara

Highway system
- State highways in California; Interstate; US; State; Scenic; History; Pre‑1964; Unconstructed; Deleted; Freeways
| ← SR 236 | → I-238 |

State Route 237 (SR 237) is a state highway in the U.S. state of California that runs from El Camino Real (SR 82) in Mountain View to Interstate 680 in Milpitas. Known as the Southbay Freeway for most of its length, SR 237 runs south of the San Francisco Bay, connecting the East Bay to the Peninsula.

== Route description ==
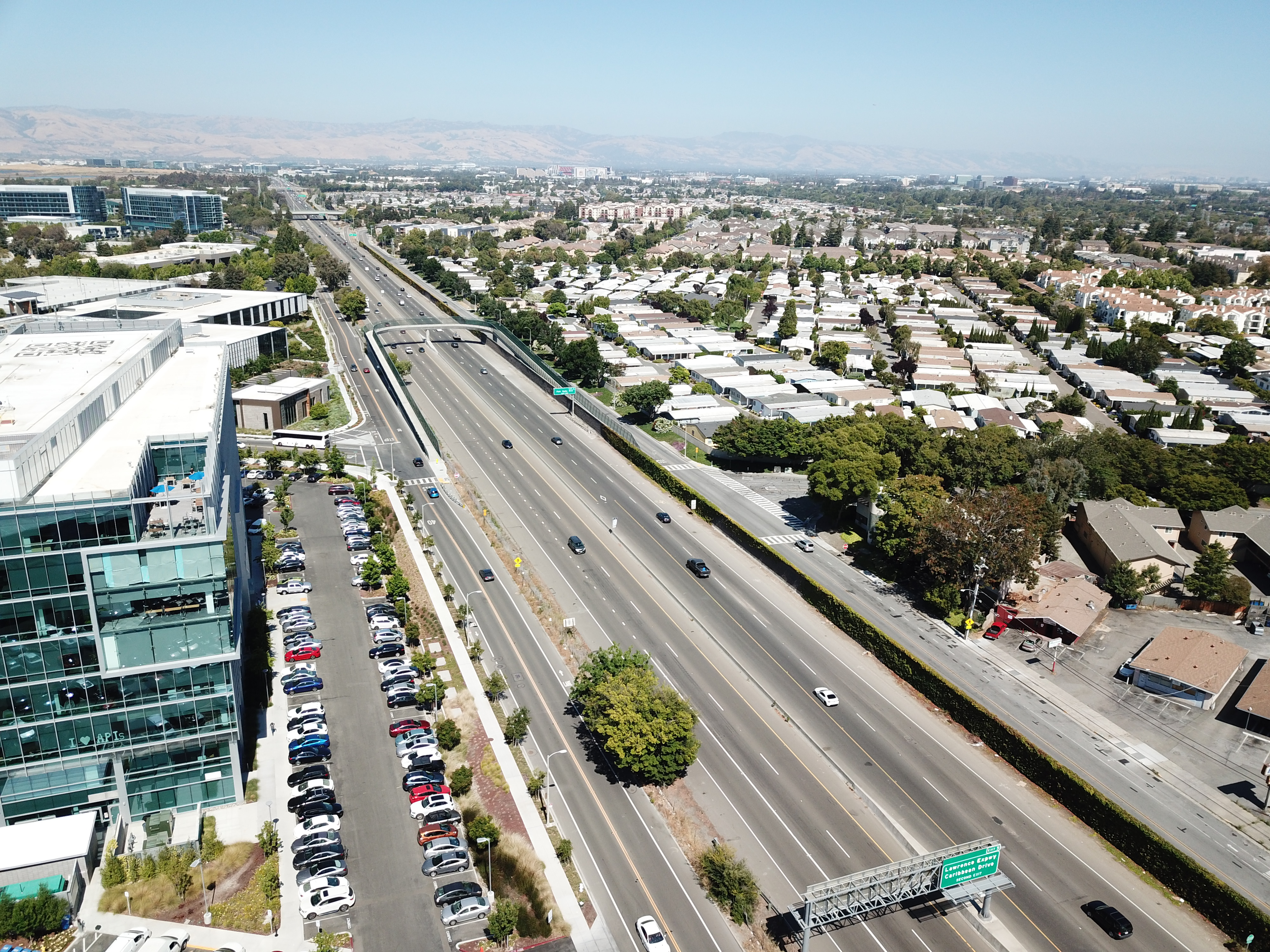
An aerial view of California State Route 237, Sunnyvale, looking east, taken from above a parking garage on the north side of the road

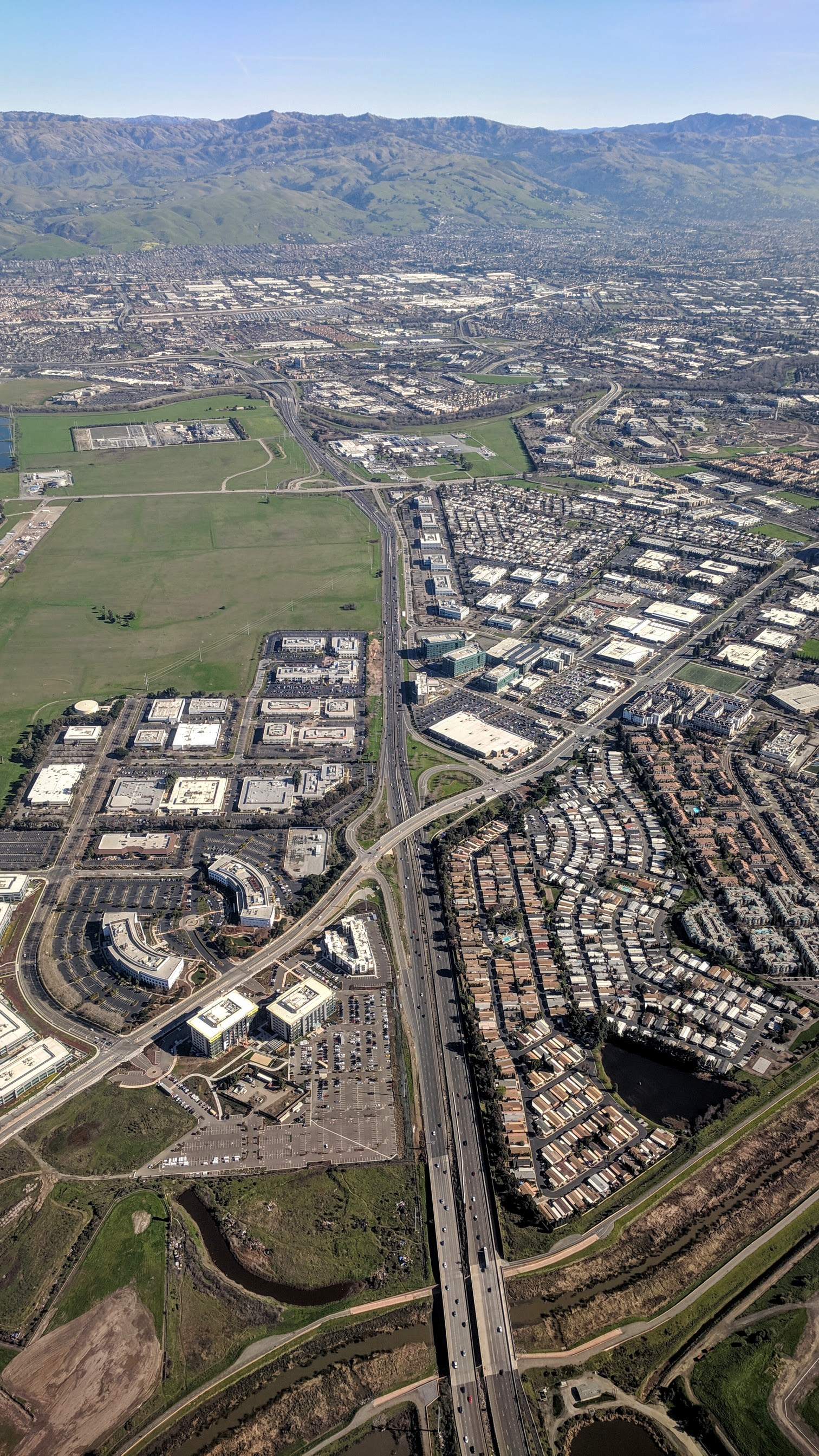
California State Route 237, San Jose, looking east from above Santa Clara

Route 237 is defined in section 537 of the California Streets and Highways Code, and that the highway is "from Route 82 in Mountain View to Route 680 in Milpitas".

Route 237 begins at a junction of Grant Road with El Camino Real (SR 82) in Mountain View, as a four lane divided highway. Most traffic comes from California State Route 85. Westbound traffic can connect to Route 85 southbound, but the eastbound traffic connection to Route 85 northbound is labeled as an exit for U.S. 101. Route 237 intersects with Highway 101 at the southern corner of Moffett Field. After this intersection, a carpool lane is added, for a total of three lanes in either direction. It remains like this until the east end of the freeway at Interstate 880, where most eastbound traffic is directed to northbound I-880. The route then becomes a city street (an arterial road), Calaveras Boulevard, in Milpitas, terminating at Interstate 680.

Starting from half a mile after the highway's western terminus, and ending at the I-880 intersection, Route 237 is named the Southbay Freeway. It is mostly constructed to Interstate standards, although there are no current plans to make it an Interstate highway.

Route 237 is known for a number of companies that define Silicon Valley's technological landscape. Many major software and hardware manufacturers have their headquarters along 237. Some of these manufacturers include Lockheed-Martin, Brocade Communications Systems, Nortel Networks, Cisco Systems, Yahoo!, Juniper Networks, TiVo, Ariba and NetApp.

SR 237 is part of the California Freeway and Expressway System, and is part of the National Highway System, a network of highways that are considered essential to the country's economy, defense, and mobility by the Federal Highway Administration.

=== Highway 237 Bikeway ===
The Highway 237 Bikeway is a 5-mile (8.0 km) pedestrian and bicycle path that parallels State Route 237. The majority of the path is separated from vehicular traffic, however, two sections comprising a total of 1.5 miles (2.4 km) follow an on-street alignment adjacent the freeway.

This bikeway serves as an important connector in the network of trails in San Jose and Santa Clara County. It intersects with the Guadalupe River Trail, which provides access to Downtown San Jose. It also connects to the Bay Trail, the San Tomas Aquino Creek Trail, and the Coyote Creek Trail.

=== Express lanes ===
The SR 237 Express Lanes, the 5-mile-long (8.0 km) high-occupancy toll (HOT) lanes along Route 237 in both directions between Mathilda Avenue in Sunnyvale and I-880 in Milpitas, opened on March 20, 2012, east of North First Street and on November 22, 2019, up to Mathilda Avenue. Instead of terminating exactly at the I-880 interchange, the Express Lanes continue along an connector ramp to I-880, so that eastbound Express Lane users merge directly into the I-880 northbound HOV lane (which itself becomes an Express Lane), and I-880 southbound Express Lane users can directly enter Route 237's westbound Express Lane.

As of January 2026, the HOT lanes' hours of operation is weekdays between 5:00 am and 8:00 pm; they are otherwise free and open to all vehicles at other times. Two-person carpools are charged 50 percent of the posted toll. Carpools with 3 or more people and motorcycles are not charged. All tolls are collected using an open road tolling system, and therefore there are no toll booths to receive cash. Each vehicle using the HOT lanes is required to carry a FasTrak Flex transponder with its switch set to indicate the number of the vehicle's occupants (1, 2, or 3+). Solo drivers may also use the FasTrak standard tag without the switch. Drivers without any FasTrak tag will be assessed a toll violation regardless of whether they qualified for free.

== History ==
Before Route 237 was upgraded to freeway status in 1994–1995, it was a four-lane expressway with at-grade intersections, known as Alviso-Milpitas Road or Milpitas-Alviso Road depending on different maps showing the description.

The Route 237 corridor has long been sought as a location for a freeway connector between Interstates 680 and 880. Many possible sites have been suggested, from Montague Expressway in North San Jose to Mission Boulevard in Fremont. One map printed before Route 237's construction to freeway standards between Alviso and 880 showed a new freeway across bay wetlands between Alviso and the Scott Creek Road interchange in South Fremont. Grading and underpasses for a freeway interchange are presently visible along 680 near Scott Creek Road.

== Major intersections ==
Except where prefixed with a letter, postmiles were measured on the road as it was in 1964, based on the alignment that existed at the time, and do not necessarily reflect current mileage. Postmile prefixes include: R reflecting a realignment in the route since then, M indicating a second realignment, L referring to an overlap due to a correction or change, and T indicating postmiles classified as temporary. Segments that remain unconstructed or have been relinquished to local control may be omitted. The entire route is in Santa Clara County.

| Location | Postmile | Exit | Destinations | Notes |
|---|---|---|---|---|
| Mountain View | R0.00 | | Grant Road | Continuation beyond SR 82; serves El Camino Health – Mountain View Hospital |
| Mountain View | R0.00 | 1A | SR 82 (El Camino Real) – Mountain View, Los Altos | Western terminus of SR 237 |
| Mountain View | | West end of freeway | | |
| Mountain View | R0.38 | 1A | SR 85 north to US 101 north – San Francisco | Eastbound exit and westbound entrance; SR 85 south exit 22A |
| Mountain View | R0.38 | 1B | SR 85 south to SR 82 south – Los Gatos, Santa Cruz | Westbound exit and eastbound entrance; SR 85 north exit 22C |
| Mountain View | R0.61 | 1B | Dana Street | Signed as exit 1C westbound |
| Mountain View | M1.55 | 2 | Middlefield Road, Maude Avenue | |
| Sunnyvale | 2.48 | 3A | US 101 south (Bayshore Freeway) – San Jose | Eastbound exit and westbound entrance; westbound access is via exit 3B; US 101 north exit 396C |
| Sunnyvale | 2.48 | 3A | US 101 north (Bayshore Freeway) – San Francisco | Westbound exit and eastbound entrance; eastbound access is via exit 3B; US 101 south exit 396B |
| Sunnyvale | 2.99 | 3B | Mathilda Avenue to US 101 – San Francisco, Sunnyvale | Former SR 9 south |
| Sunnyvale | | — | SR 237 Express Lanes | West end of Express Lanes |
| Sunnyvale | R3.97 | 4 | Fair Oaks Avenue | Eastbound exit and westbound entrance |
| Sunnyvale | R4.60 | 5 | Lawrence Expressway (CR G2), Caribbean Drive | Northern terminus of CR G2 |
| Santa Clara | R5.83 | 6 | Great America Parkway | |
| San Jose | 6.87 | 7 | North First Street | |
| San Jose | 8.02 | 8 | Zanker Road | |
| San Jose | | — | SR 237 Express Lanes | Easternmost access point on mainline SR 237 |
| San Jose | | — | I-880 north – Oakland | Express Lanes access only; eastbound exit and westbound entrance |
| Milpitas | R9.13 | 9A | McCarthy Boulevard | |
| Milpitas | 9.34 | 9B | I-880 south (Nimitz Freeway) – San Jose | I-880 north exit 8B, south exit 8B-C; former SR 17 |
| Milpitas | 9.34 | 9C | I-880 north (Nimitz Freeway) – Oakland | I-880 north exit 8B, south exit 8B-C; former SR 17 |
| Milpitas | | East end of freeway | | |
| Milpitas | 10.00 | 10 | Main Street | Interchange; exit ramps to Main Street from both directions; former SR 238 |
| Milpitas | 11.08 | 11A | I-680 south (Sinclair Freeway) – San Jose | Eastern terminus of SR 237; I-680 exit 8 |
| Milpitas | 11.08 | 11B | I-680 north (Sinclair Freeway) – Sacramento | Eastern terminus of SR 237; I-680 exit 8 |
| Milpitas | 11.08 | | Calaveras Boulevard | Continuation beyond I-680 |
1.000 mi = 1.609 km; 1.000 km = 0.621 mi: Electronic toll collection; Incomplete access
