= California State Route 236 =

Highway in California

State Route 236

- Map of Santa Cruz County in western California with SR 236 highlighted in red

Route information
- Maintained by Caltrans
- Length: 17.721 mi (28.519 km)

Major junctions
- South end: SR 9 at Boulder Creek
- North end: SR 9 at Waterman Gap

Location
- Country: United States
- State: California
- Counties: Santa Cruz

Highway system
- State highways in California; Interstate; US; State; Scenic; History; Pre‑1964; Unconstructed; Deleted; Freeways
← SR 235	→ SR 237

State Route 236 (SR 236) is a state highway in the U.S. state of California. It is an approximately 18-mile (29 km) C-shaped loop route of State Route 9 in the Santa Cruz Mountains that serves Big Basin Redwoods State Park. SR 236 begins in the community of Boulder Creek and ends at Governor's Camp in Big Basin State Park near the Waterman Gap.

Several sections of the road are less than two lanes wide and large vehicles are discouraged from traveling this road. The reason for the narrow road is to not disturb the large redwood trees that the road passes by in the densely forested lowlands.

== Route description ==
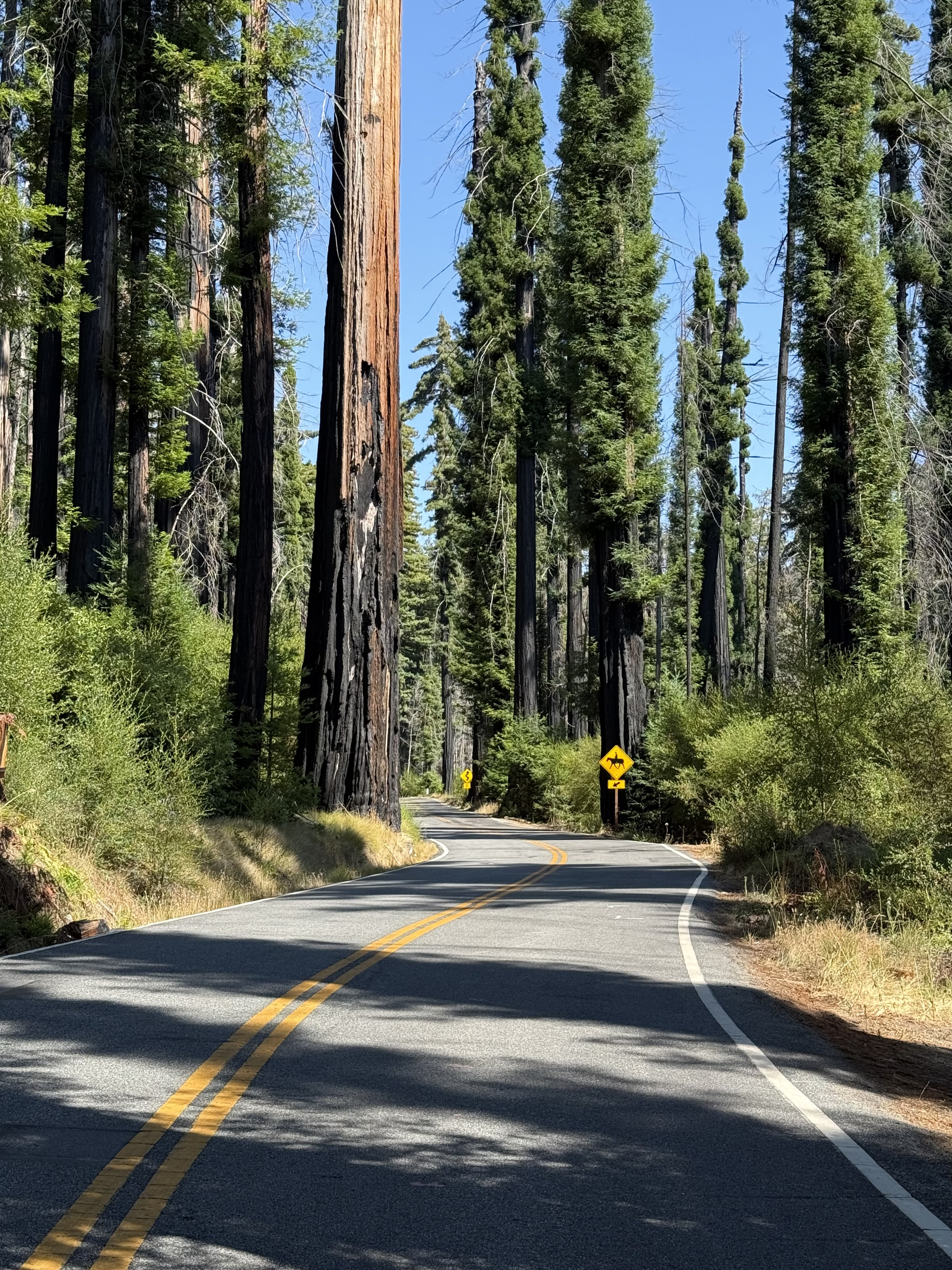
SR 236 through Big Basin Redwoods State Park

Route 236 is defined in section 536 of the California Streets and Highways Code, and that the highway is "from Route 9 in Boulder Creek to Route 9 near Waterman Gap via Governor's Camp in Big Basin Redwoods State Park".

SR 236 begins with an at-grade intersection with SR 9 within the small town of Boulder Creek. The road then heads northwestward through an area of evergreen forest, exiting the town. After several switchbacks, the route heads westward into Big Basin Redwoods State Park, where its name is Big Basin Highway. Amidst the park, the road turns abruptly toward the north, where it continues winding through the forest. As it exits the park, the road abruptly turns eastward again, heading again toward SR 9, where it meets its northern terminus.

SR 236 is not part of the National Highway System, a network of highways that are considered essential to the country's economy, defense, and mobility by the Federal Highway Administration.

== Major intersections ==
Except where prefixed with a letter, postmiles were measured on the road as it was in 1964, based on the alignment that existed at the time, and do not necessarily reflect current mileage. Postmile prefixes include: R reflecting a realignment in the route since then, M indicating a second realignment, L referring to an overlap due to a correction or change, and T indicating postmiles classified as temporary. Segments that remain unconstructed or have been relinquished to local control may be omitted. The entire route is in Santa Cruz County.

Location	Postmile	Destinations	Notes
Boulder Creek	0.00	SR 9 (Central Avenue) – Santa Cruz, San Francisco	South end of SR 236
Waterman Gap	17.72	SR 9 – Saratoga, Santa Cruz	North end of SR 236
1.000 mi = 1.609 km; 1.000 km = 0.621 mi
