= Chittenden, California =

Unincorporated community in California, United States

- Unincorporated community
- Location within California Location within the United States
- Coordinates: 36°54′05″N 121°36′19″W
- Country: United States
- State: California
- County: Santa Cruz
- Elevation: 125 ft (38 m)
- Time zone: UTC-8 (Pacific (PST))
  - Summer (DST): UTC-7 (PDT)
- Area code: 831
- GNIS feature ID: 251973

Chittenden is an unincorporated community in Santa Cruz County, California, United States. Chittenden is located along California State Route 129 and the north bank of the Pajaro River, across the river from River Oaks and 8.4 miles (13.5 km) east of Watsonville.
