= California State Route 129 =

Highway in California

State Route 129

- SR 129 highlighted in red

Route information
- Maintained by Caltrans
- Length: 14.095 mi (22.684 km)
- Existed: 1964–present

Major junctions
- West end: SR 1 near Watsonville
- East end: US 101 near San Juan Bautista

Location
- Country: United States
- State: California
- Counties: Santa Cruz, San Benito

Highway system
- State highways in California; Interstate; US; State; Scenic; History; Pre‑1964; Unconstructed; Deleted; Freeways
| ← SR 128 | → SR 130 |

State Route 129 (SR 129) is a state highway in the U.S. state of California, connecting State Route 1 in Watsonville in Santa Cruz County with U.S. Route 101 near San Juan Bautista in San Benito County.

== Route description ==
Route 129 is defined in section 429 of the California Streets and Highways Code, and that the highway is "from Route 1 near Watsonville to Route 101 in San Benito County".

State Route 129 begins at State Route 1 with an interchange. SR 129 does not cross into Santa Clara County but the road comes within 700–900 feet of the Santa Cruz-San Clara County line. The road then heads northeast into the town of Watsonville along Riverside Road, where it intersects County Route G12. Heading eastward out of town, SR 129 roughly parallels the Pajaro River along the Santa Cruz-San Benito County line before entering San Benito County near Chittenden. Crossing the Pajaro River near River Oaks, the road runs southeast along Chittenden road to end at U.S. Route 101.

SR 129 near SR 1 is part of the National Highway System, a network of highways that are considered essential to the country's economy, defense, and mobility by the Federal Highway Administration.

== Major intersections ==
Except where prefixed with a letter, postmiles were measured on the road as it was in 1964, based on the alignment that existed at the time, and do not necessarily reflect current mileage. Postmile prefixes include: R reflecting a realignment in the route since then, M indicating a second realignment, L referring to an overlap due to a correction or change, and T indicating postmiles classified as temporary. Segments that remain unconstructed or have been relinquished to local control may be omitted. The numbers reset at county lines; the start and end postmiles in each county are given in the county column.

| County | Location | Postmile | Destinations | Notes |
|---|---|---|---|---|
| Santa Cruz; SCR L0.00-10.00 | | L0.00 | Lee Road | Continuation beyond SR 1 |
| Santa Cruz; SCR L0.00-10.00 | | L0.00 | SR 1 – Santa Cruz, Monterey | Interchange; west end of SR 129; SR 1 exit 425 |
| Santa Cruz; SCR L0.00-10.00 | Watsonville | L1.47 | CR G12 (Main Street) to SR 152 – Pajaro | North end of CR G12 |
| Santa Cruz; SCR L0.00-10.00 | | 3.35 | Carlton Road | |
| Santa Cruz; SCR L0.00-10.00 | | 7.20 | Rogge Lane – Aromas | |
| San Benito; SBT 0.00-R2.64 | | R2.64 | US 101 | Interchange; east end of SR 129; US 101 exit 347 |
| San Benito; SBT 0.00-R2.64 | | R2.64 | Chittenden Road | Continuation beyond US 101 |
1.000 mi = 1.609 km; 1.000 km = 0.621 mi
