= River Oaks, California =

Unincorporated community in California, United States

- Unincorporated community
- Location within California Location within the United States
- Coordinates: 36°53′59″N 121°35′40″W
- Country: United States
- State: California
- County: San Benito
- Elevation: 141 ft (43 m)
- Time zone: UTC-8 (Pacific (PST))
  - Summer (DST): UTC-7 (PDT)
- Area code: 831
- GNIS feature ID: 1656258

River Oaks is an unincorporated community in San Benito County, California, United States. River Oaks is located on the south bank of the Pajaro River and California State Route 129, 4.5 miles (7.2 km) northwest of San Juan Bautista.

== Climate ==
This region experiences warm (but not hot) and dry summers, with no average monthly temperatures above 71.6 °F. According to the Köppen Climate Classification system, River Oaks has a warm-summer Mediterranean climate, abbreviated "Csb" on climate maps.
