= History of California's state highway system =

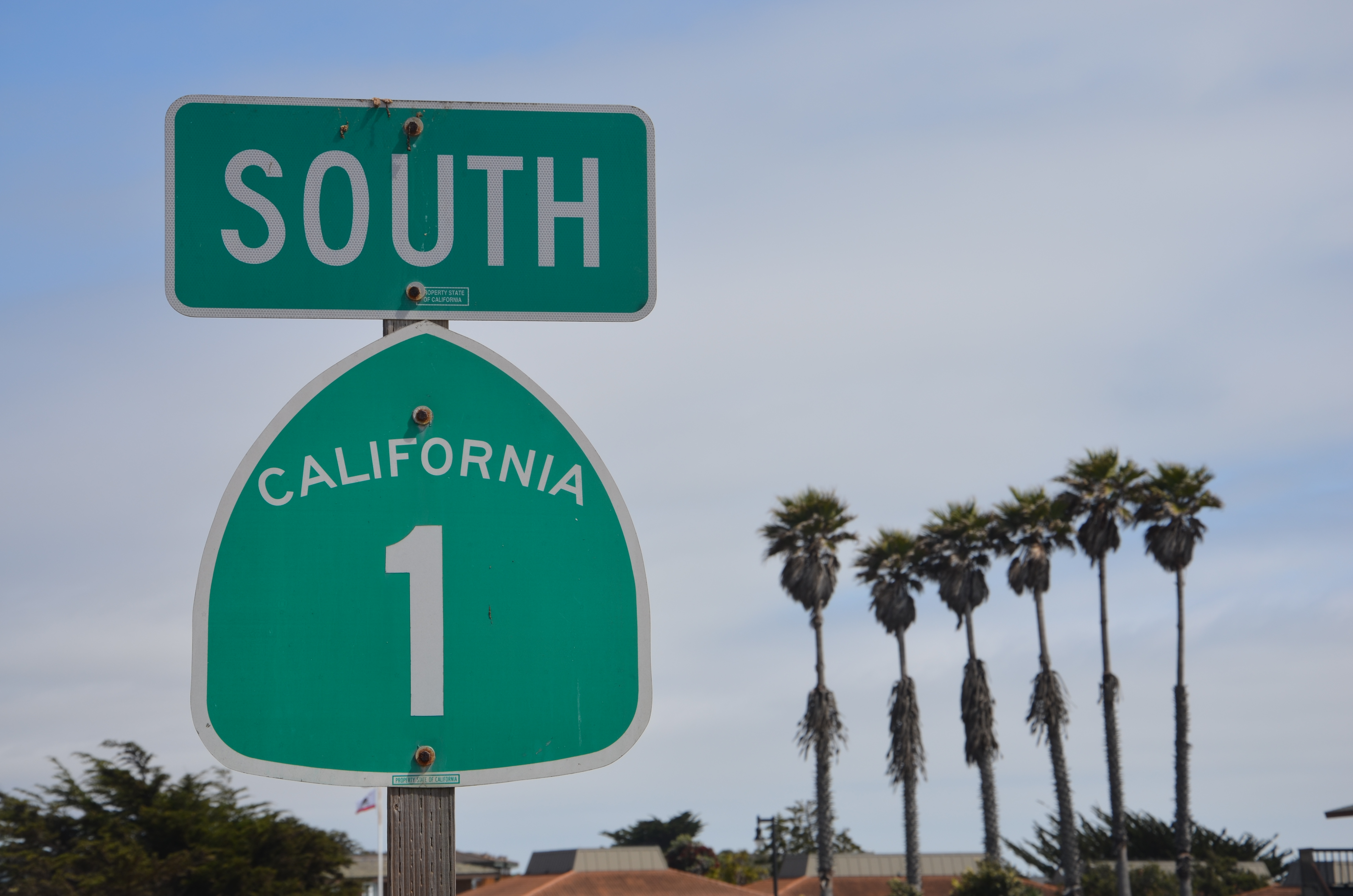
California State Route 1 road sign

The state highway system in the U.S. state of California dates back to 1896, when the state took over maintenance of the Lake Tahoe Wagon Road. Before then, roads and streets were managed exclusively by local governments. Construction of a statewide highway system began in 1912, after the state's voters approved an $18 million bond issue for over 3,000 miles (4,800 km) of highways. The last large addition was made by the California State Assembly in 1959, after which only minor changes have been made.

== 1895 to 1919 ==
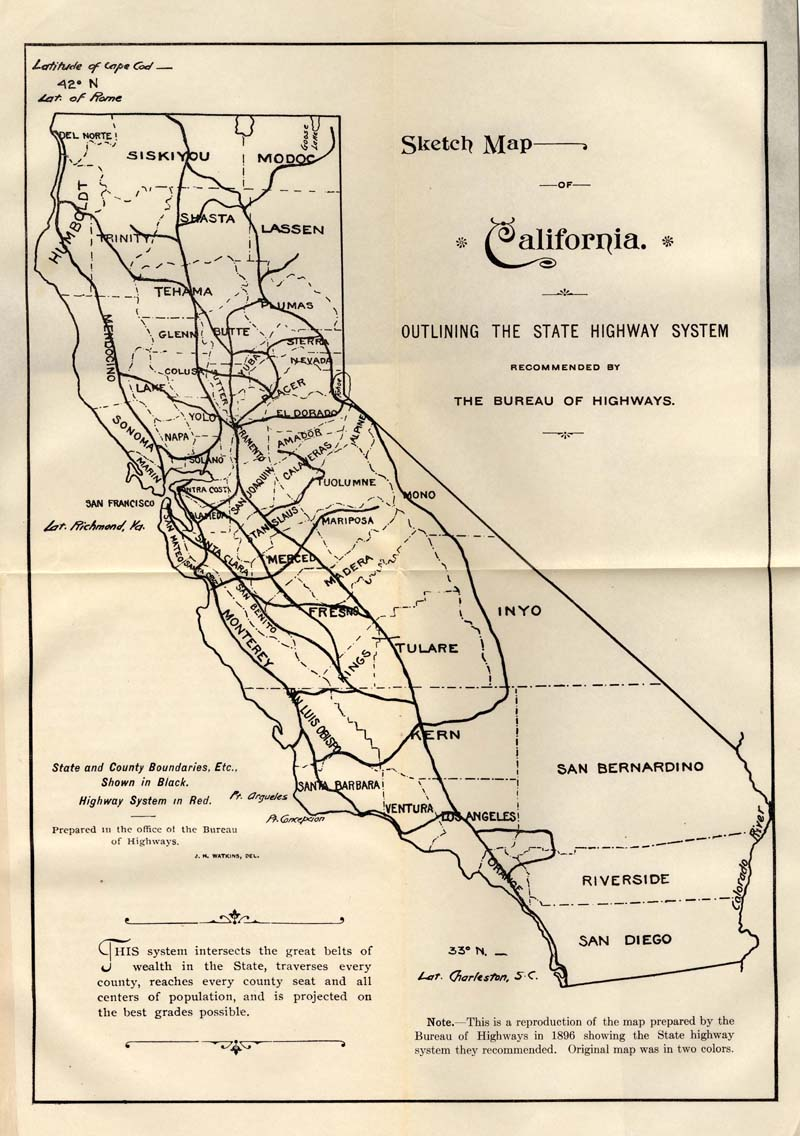
Recommended state highway system, 1896

The first state road was authorized on March 26, 1895, by the California State Legislature when it enacted a law which created the post of "Lake Tahoe Wagon Road Commissioner" to maintain the Lake Tahoe Wagon Road (the 1852 Johnson's Cut-off of the California Trail), now US 50 from Smith Flat — 3 miles (4.8 km) east of Placerville — to the Nevada state line. The 58 mile (93 km) road had been operated as a toll road until 1886, when El Dorado County bought it; the county deeded the road to the state on February 28, 1896. Funding was only enough for minimal improvements, including a stone bridge over the South Fork American River in 1901.

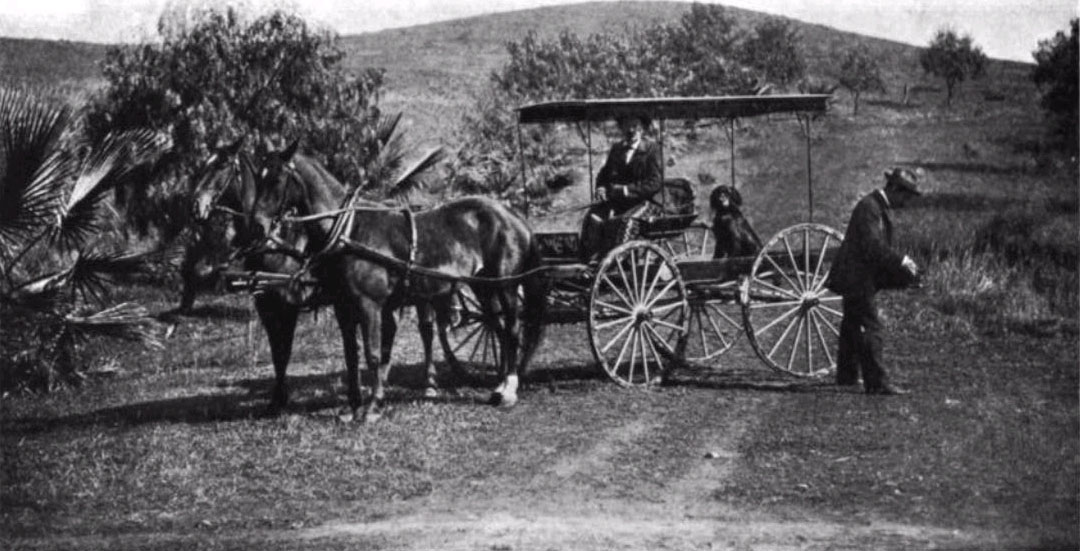
The Bureau of Highways with their buckboard wagon in Riverside County, 1896

Also in 1895, on March 27, the legislature created the three-person Bureau of Highways to coordinate efforts by the counties to build good roads. The bureau traveled to every county of the state in 1895 and 1896 and prepared a map of a recommended system of state roads, which they submitted to the governor on November 25, 1896. The legislature replaced the Bureau of Highways with the Department of Highways on April 1, 1897, three days after it passed a law creating a second state highway from Sacramento to Folsom — another part of what became US 50 — to be maintained by three "Folsom Highway Commissioners". This was the last highway maintained by a separate authority, as the next state road, the Mono Lake Basin State Road (now part of SR 120), was designated by the legislature in 1899 to be built and maintained by the Department of Highways.

Several more state highways were legislated in the next decade, and the legislature passed a law creating the Department of Engineering on March 11, 1907. This new department, in addition to non-highway duties, was to maintain all state highways, including the Lake Tahoe Wagon Road. On March 22, 1909, the "State Highways Act" was passed, taking effect on December 31, 1910, after a successful vote by the people of the state in November. This law authorized the Department of Engineering to issue $18 million in bonds for a "continuous and connected state highway system" that would connect all county seats. To this end, the department created the three-member California Highway Commission on August 8, 1911, to take full charge of the construction and maintenance of this system. As with the 1896 plan by the Bureau of Highways, the Highway Commission traveled the state to determine the best routes, which ended up stretching about 3,100 miles (5,000 km). Construction began in mid-1912, with groundbreaking on Contract One — now part of SR 82 in San Mateo County — occurring on August 7. Noteworthy portions of the system built by the commission included the Ridge Route in southern California and the Yolo Causeway west from Sacramento.

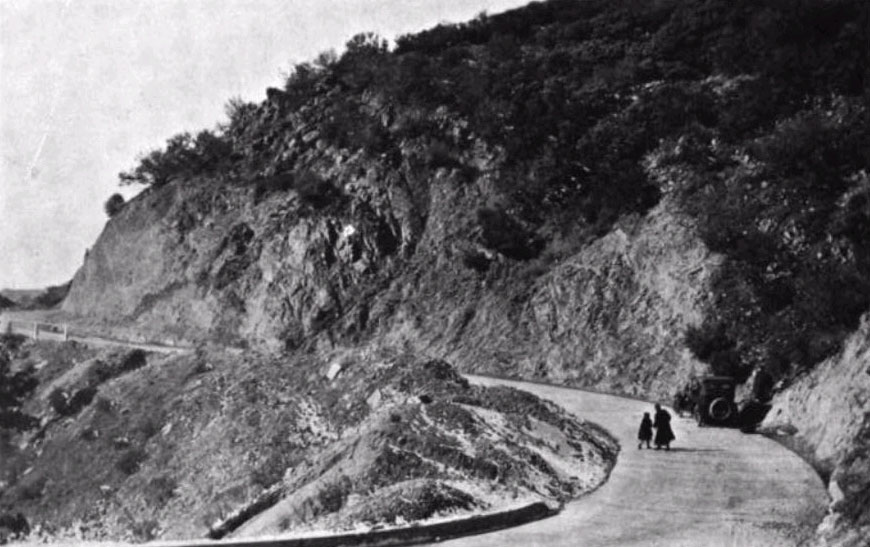
The Ridge Route, ca. 1920

Because the first bond issue did not provide enough funding, the "State Highways Act of 1915" was approved by the legislature on May 20, 1915, and the voters in November 1916, taking effect on December 31. This gave the Department of Engineering an additional $12 million to complete the original system and $3 million for a further approximately 680 miles (1,090 km) specified by the law. At this time, each route was assigned a number from 1 to 34; this system of labeling routes, although never marked with signs, remained until the 1964 renumbering. In 1917, the legislature gave the California Highway Commission statutory recognition, and turned over the approximately 750 miles (1200 km) of roads adopted by legislative act, until then maintained by the State Engineer, to the commission. Where not serving as extensions of existing routes, these - and routes subsequently added legislatively in 1917 and 1919 - were given numbers from 35 to 45. A third bond issue was approved by the voters at a special election on July 1, 1919, and provided $20 million more for the existing routes and the same amount for new extensions totaling about 1,800 miles (2,900 km), adding Routes 46 to 64 to the system. The three bond issues together totaled 5,560 miles (8,950 km), of which just over 40% (60% if the 1919 bond issue is left out) was completed or under construction in mid-1920.

== 1920 to 1958 ==
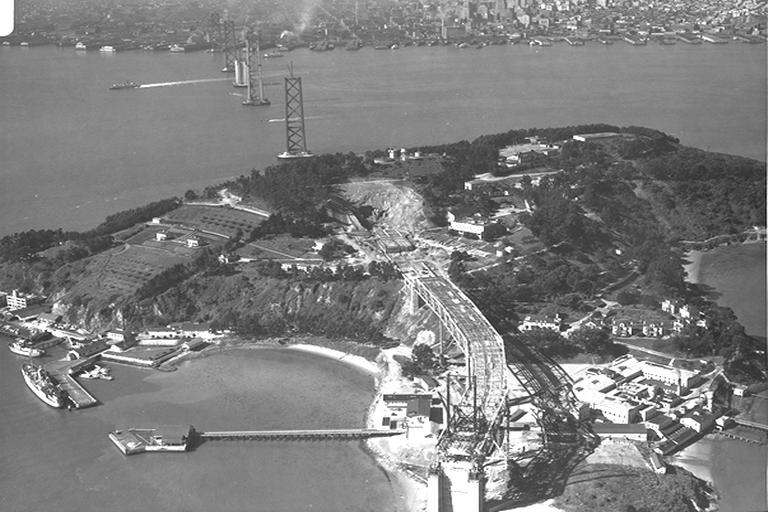
San Francisco–Oakland Bay Bridge construction, 1935

The Department of Engineering became part of the new Department of Public Works in 1921, and the California Highway Commission was entirely separated as its own department in 1923. In order to pay for the roads, a 2-cent per gallon gasoline tax was approved in 1923. The legislature continued to add highways to the system, including the Mother Lode Highway (now part of SR 49) in 1921 and the Arrowhead Trail (now I-15 north of Barstow) in 1925. In January 1928, the California State Automobile Association and Automobile Club of Southern California, which had already been placing guide and warning signs along state highways, marked the U.S. Highways along several of the most major state highways. The California Toll Bridge Authority was created in 1929 to acquire and operate all toll bridges on state highways, including the San Francisco–Oakland Bay Bridge and Carquinez Bridge.

The state highway system in 1930

After 1927 and 1929, in which no highways were added to the system, the legislature authorized the construction of 23 new routes in 1931, which were numbered from 72 to 80 when not forming extensions of existing routes. Two years later, another 213 sections of highway were added, almost doubling the total length of state highways to about 14,000 miles (23,000 km); the last-assigned route number jumped from 80 to 202. Many of these new routes, as well as a number of existing routes, were incorporated into the initial system of state sign routes in 1934, also posted by the auto clubs.

The Division of Highways took over signage on state highways from the auto clubs in 1947, though at least the Auto Club of Southern California continued to place signs on city streets until 1956.

== The "Great Renumbering" of 1964 ==
In 1963 and 1964, the California Division of Highways implemented a major renumbering of its state highways. The majority of sign routes — those marked for the public — kept their numbers; the main changes were to the legislative routes, which had their numbers changed to match the sign routes. A large number of formerly unsigned routes received sign numbers corresponding to their new legislative numbers. A smaller change was the removal and truncating of many U.S. Routes in favor of the Interstate Highways (designated in 1959), and the renumbering of State Routes that conflicted with Interstate numbers. Some U.S. Routes that were officially removed continued to be signed until the replacement Interstates were completed. The state law authorizing the renumbering was passed on September 20, 1963. Signage changes took place by July 1, 1964.

== 1964 to present ==
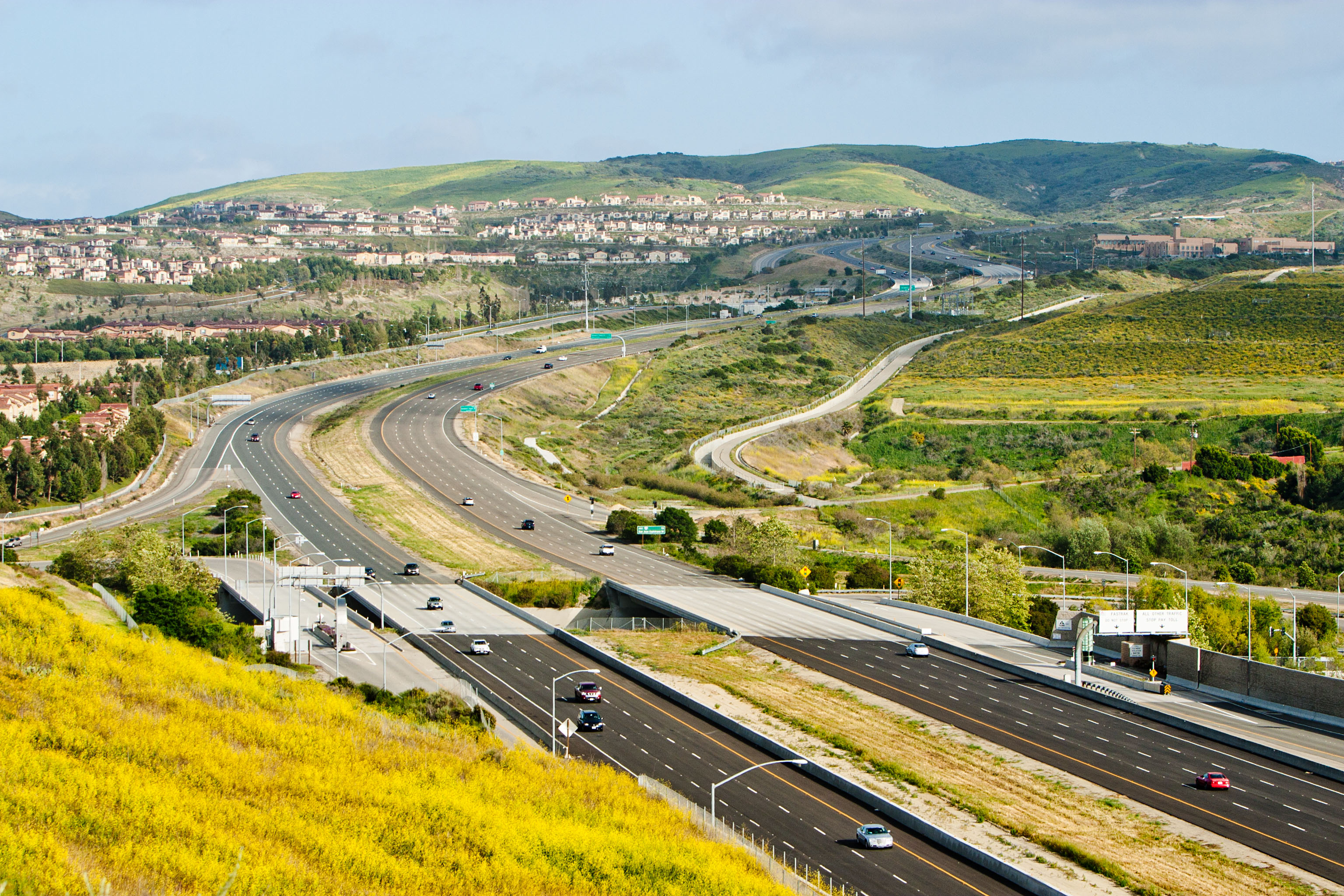
The San Joaquin Hills Toll Road (State Route 73) climbs into the San Joaquin Hills, as seen looking southward from University Hills in Irvine. In the foreground is the tolled Bonita Canyon Drive exit.

A regularly recurring issue in California politics since the 1960s was whether the state should continue to aggressively expand its freeway network or concentrate on improving mass transit networks. Freeway revolts sprang up across the state in the 1960s and 1970s, killing or delaying several projects such as a freeway in San Francisco between the Golden Gate Bridge and the San Francisco–Oakland Bay Bridge better known as the Embarcadero Freeway, and an expansion of Interstate 710 through South Pasadena.

Both the National Environmental Policy Act of 1969 and the California Environmental Quality Act of 1970 added significant environmental regulations to highway construction. Then in 1972, the Department of Public Works was merged with the Department of Aeronautics to become the modern California Department of Transportation (Caltrans). Now Caltrans not only manages the state highway system, but is also actively involved with public transportation systems throughout the state, and thus is essentially in charge of the entire state's transportation network.

Toll roads and high-occupancy toll lanes began to open across the state beginning in the 1990s. The decade also saw the implementation of FasTrak, California's electronic toll collection (ETC) system, across all toll facilities on state highways. The 91 Express Lanes opened in 1995 along State Route 91 between Anaheim and the Riverside County line, developed as a partnership between Caltrans and the private California Private Transportation Company (CPTC). The Transportation Corridor Agencies, a local agency created by the state, also established three toll roads in Orange California in the 1990s. Another privately financed toll highway project, the South Bay Expressway, began operation in San Diego County in 2007. Several of these other HOT lanes across various state highway are also either currently under construction or in the planning stages that will open in the near future.

== List of route numbers, 1917-1931 ==
	Approximate present number(s)	From	To	History
1	US 101, US 199	Sausalito	Oregon	1910 bond issue: Sausalito to Crescent City; 1919 bond issue: Crescent City to Oregon
2	US 101, I-5	San Francisco	San Diego	1910 bond issue: entire route
3	I-80, SR 65, SR 99, I-5	Sacramento	Oregon	1910 bond issue: entire route
4	SR 99, I-5	Sacramento	Los Angeles	1910 bond issue: entire route
5	I-5, I-205, I-580, SR 238, I-680, SR 17	Stockton	Santa Cruz, with a branch to Oakland	1910 bond issue: entire route
6	I-80	Sacramento	Davis	1910 bond issue: entire route
7	I-680, I-80, SR 113, I-5	Benicia	Red Bluff	1910 bond issue: entire route
8	SR 37, SR 121, SR 12	Novato	Fairfield	1910 bond issue: entire route
9	SR 118, I-210, SR 66	San Fernando	San Bernardino	1910 bond issue: entire route (San Bernardino County seat lateral)
10	SR 198	San Lucas	Sequoia National Park	1910 bond issue: Hanford to Visalia (Kings County and Tulare County seat lateral); 1916 bond issue: San Lucas to Hanford; 1919 bond issue: Visalia to Sequoia National Park
11	US 50	Sacramento	Nevada	1895 law: Smith Flat to Nevada; 1897 law: Sacramento to Folsom; 1910 bond issue: Sacramento to Placerville (El Dorado County seat lateral); 1915 law: Placerville to Smith Flat; 1919 bond issue: Placerville to Pollock Pines
12	I-8	San Diego	El Centro	1910 bond issue: entire route (Imperial County seat lateral)
13	SR 219, SR 108	Salida	East of Sonora Pass	1901 law: Long Barn to east of Sonora Pass; 1910 bond issue: Salida to Sonora (Tuolumne County seat lateral); 1919 law: Sonora to Long Barn
14	SR 123, I-80	Oakland	Martinez	1910 bond issue: entire route (Contra Costa County seat lateral)
15	SR 20	Ukiah	Emigrant Gap	1910 bond issue: Williams to Colusa (Colusa County seat lateral); 1919 bond issue: Ukiah to Williams and Colusa to Emigrant Gap
16	SR 175	Hopland	Lakeport	1910 bond issue: entire route (Lake County seat lateral)
17	I-80, SR 49	Roseville	Nevada City	1910 bond issue: entire route (Placer County and Nevada County seat lateral)
18	SR 140	Merced	Yosemite National Park	1910 bond issue: Merced to Mariposa (Mariposa County seat lateral); 1915 law: through Yosemite National Park; 1916 bond issue: Mariposa to Yosemite National Park
19	SR 71, SR 60	West of Claremont	Riverside	1910 bond issue: entire route (Riverside County seat lateral)
20	SR 299	Arcata	Redding	1910 bond issue: Weaverville to Redding (Trinity County seat lateral); 1916 bond issue: Arcata to Salyer and Helena to Weaverville
21	SR 162, SR 70	Richvale	Quincy	1910 bond issue: Richvale to Oroville as Route 21 (Butte County seat lateral) and Oroville to Quincy as Route 30 (Plumas County seat lateral); 1919 bond issue: Oroville to Quincy as Route 21
22	SR 156	North of Hollister	San Juan Bautista	1910 bond issue: Hollister to San Juan Bautista (San Benito County seat lateral); 1919 bond issue: north of Hollister to Hollister
23	SR 14, US 395, SR 89	Saugus	South Lake Tahoe	1901 law: Bridgeport to east of Sonora Pass; 1910 bond issue: Saugus to Bridgeport (Inyo County and Mono County seat lateral); 1911 law: east of Sonora Pass to South Lake Tahoe
24	SR 12, SR 49, SR 4	Lodi	Southeast of Markleeville	1910 bond issue: Lodi to San Andreas (Calaveras County seat lateral); 1911 law: Calaveras Big Trees to southeast of Markleeville; 1921 law: San Andreas to Angels Camp; 1925 law: Angels Camp to Calaveras Big Trees
25	SR 49	Nevada City	Downieville	1910 bond issue: entire route (Sierra County seat lateral)
26	I-10, SR 86	San Bernardino	El Centro	1916 bond issue: entire route
27	I-8	El Centro	Arizona	1916 bond issue: entire route
28	SR 299	Redding	Nevada	1910 bond issue: Redding to Alturas (Modoc County seat lateral); 1911 law: Pittville to Adin; 1921 law: Alturas to Nevada
29	SR 36, US 395	Red Bluff	Nevada	1910 bond issue: Red Bluff to Susanville (Lassen County seat lateral); 1919 bond issue: Susanville to Nevada
30	SR 70	Oroville	Quincy	See Route 21
31	I-215, I-15	San Bernardino	Nevada	1916 bond issue: San Bernardino to Barstow; 1925 law: Barstow to Nevada
32	SR 152	Chowchilla	Gilroy	1916 bond issue: entire route
33	SR 46	Bakersfield	Paso Robles	1916 bond issue: entire route
34	SR 104, SR 88	Galt	Southeast of Luther Pass	1910 bond issue: Galt to Jackson (Amador County seat lateral); 1911 law: Jackson to southeast of Luther Pass
35	SR 36, SR 3	Mad River	Peanut	1907 law: entire route
36	N/A	Northwest of Downieville	Downieville	1907 law: entire route
37	I-80	Auburn	Truckee	1909 law: Emigrant Gap to Donner Lake; 1915 law: Donner Lake to Truckee; 1915 law: Auburn to Emigrant Gap; 1919 bond issue: entire route
38	SR 89, I-80	South Lake Tahoe	Nevada	1911 law: South Lake Tahoe to Homewood; 1915 law: Homewood to Truckee; 1919 law: Truckee to Nevada; 1919 bond issue: Tahoe City to Nevada
39	SR 28	Tahoe City	Nevada	1915 law: entire route
40	SR 120	West of Chinese Camp	Lee Vining	1899 law: Yosemite National Park to west of Lee Vining; 1915 law: through Yosemite National Park; 1915 law: west of Chinese Camp to Yosemite National Park; 1917 law: west of Lee Vining to Lee Vining
41	SR 180	General Grant Grove	Kings Canyon	1909 law: entire route 1919 bond issue: entire route
42	SR 9, SR 236	Saratoga Gap	Big Basin Redwoods State Park	1913 law: entire route
43	SR 18	Waterman Canyon	Big Bear Lake	1917 law: Waterman Canyon to east end of Big Bear Lake via north side 1919 bond issue: Arrowbear Lake to Metcalf Bay on south side of Big Bear Lake
44	SR 236	Boulder Creek	Big Basin Redwoods State Park	1913 law: within the park 1917 law: outside the park
45	SR 162	Biggs	Willows	1919 law: entire route
46	SR 96, SR 169	North of Yreka	Klamath	1919 bond issue: entire route
47	SR 32	Orland	Chico	1919 bond issue: entire route
48	SR 128	Cloverdale	Albion	1919 bond issue: entire route
49	SR 29, SR 53	Calistoga	North of Lower Lake	1919 bond issue: Calistoga to Lower Lake as Route 49 and Lower Lake to north of Lower Lake as Route 50
50	SR 16	Northeast of Lower Lake	Rumsey	1919 bond issue: entire route
51	SR 12	Santa Rosa	Sonoma	1919 bond issue: entire route
52	SR 131	Tiburon	Mill Valley	1919 bond issue: entire route
53	SR 12	Fairfield	Lodi	1919 bond issue: Fairfield to Rio Vista; 1921 law: Rio Vista to Lodi
54	SR 16	East of Sloughhouse	Plymouth	1919 bond issue: entire route
55	SR 35	San Francisco	North of Santa Cruz	1919 bond issue: entire route
56	SR 1	Cambria	Carmel	1919 bond issue: San Simeon to Carmel; 1921 law: Cambria to San Simeon
57	SR 166, SR 119, SR 178	Santa Maria	Freeman Junction	1919 bond issue: entire route
58	SR 58, I-40	Mojave	Arizona	1919 bond issue: Mojave to Needles; 1925 law: Needles to Arizona
59	SR 138	Gorman	Lancaster	1919 bond issue: entire route
60	SR 1	El Rio	San Juan Capistrano	1919 bond issue: Oxnard to San Juan Capistrano; 1925 law: El Rio to Oxnard
61	SR 2	La Canada Flintridge	Red Box Gap	1919 bond issue: entire route
62	SR 39	Azusa	San Gabriel Canyon	1919 bond issue: entire route
63	SR 168	Big Pine	Oasis	1919 bond issue: entire route
64	I-10	Mecca	Blythe	1919 bond issue: entire route
65	SR 49	Auburn	Sonora	1921 law: entire route
66	SR 120	Lathrop	Manteca	1921 law: entire route
67	SR 129	San Juan Bautista	Chittenden	1921 law: entire route
68	US 101	San Francisco	San Jose	1923 and 1925 laws: entire route
69	I-580	San Rafael	Point San Quentin	1925 law: entire route
70	SR 222	Ukiah	Mendocino State Hospital	1925 law: entire route
71	US 101	Crescent City	Oregon	1925 law: entire route

== See also ==
- Butterfield Overland Mail
- California Trail
- El Camino Real (California)
- El Camino Viejo
- Rincon Sea Level Road
- Southern Emigrant Trail
- Stockton – Los Angeles Road
