= Central Park (San Mateo) =

Public park in San Mateo, California, United States

Central Park & Recreation Center
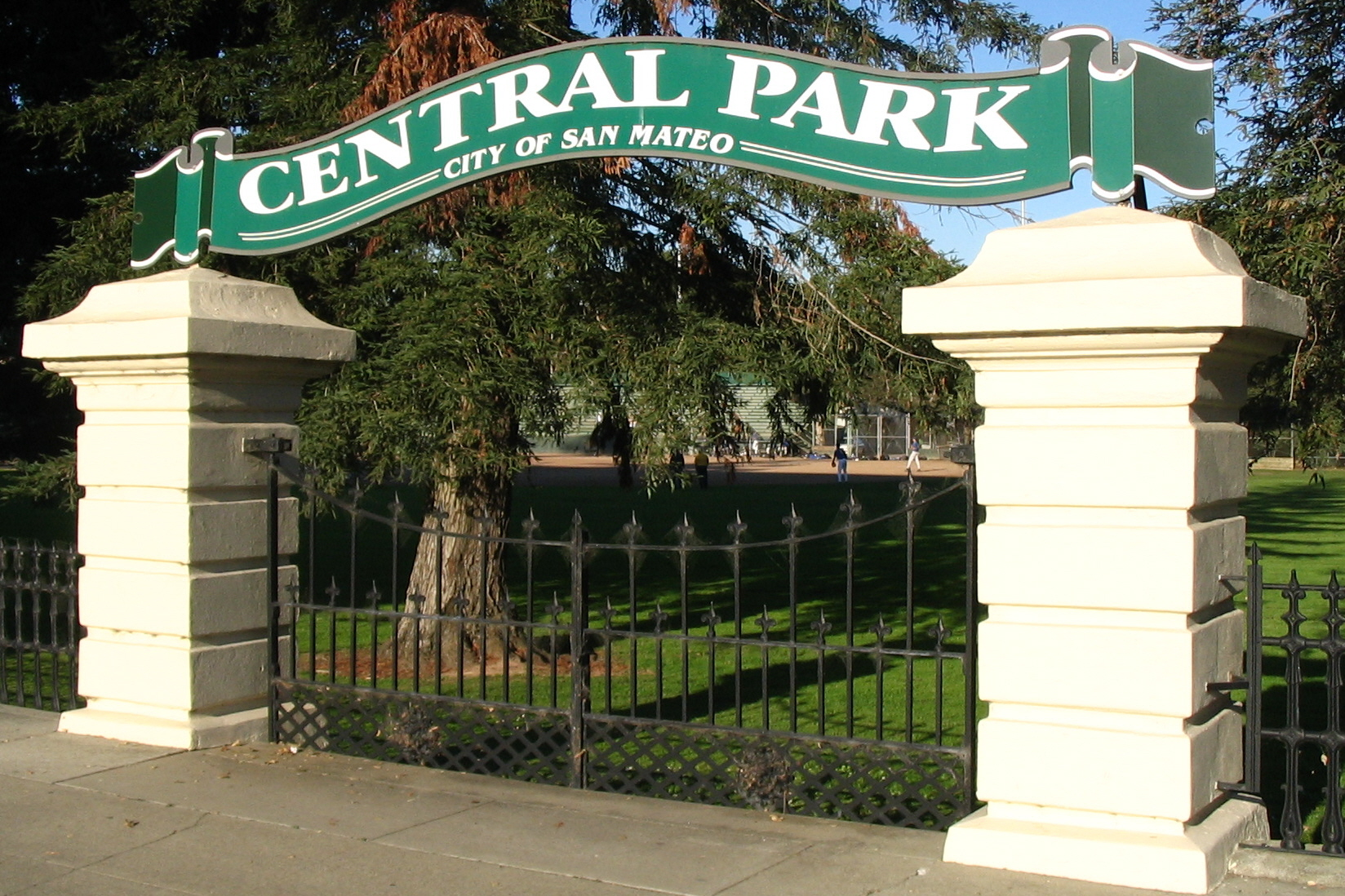
- Entrance sign for Central Park

- Location within San Francisco Bay Area
- Type: Urban park
- Location: San Mateo, California
- Coordinates: 37°33′42.6″N 122°19′21.6″W
- Area: 16.5 acres (7 ha)
- Open: 1922
- Parking: street, garage
- Public transit: SamTrans (Route ECR); Caltrain (San Mateo)
- Website: Official website

Central Park is the first public park in San Mateo, California, a 16.5-acre (7 ha) urban park bounded by El Camino Real (to the southwest), 5th Avenue (to the northwest), Laurel Avenue (to the northeast) and 9th Avenue (to the southeast). It was established via a 1922 bond measure of US$80,000 (equivalent to $1,540,000 in 2025) to purchase the land originally owned by Charles B. Polhemus, and currently hosts a baseball field, tennis courts, sculptures, playground, Japanese tea garden, recreation center, miniature train, rose garden and the San Mateo Arboretum.

== Features ==
1 Recreation Center
2 Fitzgerald Field
3 Tennis Courts & Garage
4 Japanese Tea Garden
5 Playground
6 Miniature railway
7 Rose Garden
8 Leon (giraffe)
9 Arboretum & Pump House
10 Iron Dog statue

=== Recreation center ===
Central Park's recreation center is leased by Self-Help for the Elderly (SHE), offering activities for approximately 1,000 senior citizens between 8 a.m. and 5 p.m. on weekdays. SHE primarily serves low-income and minority senior citizens. The Central Park location is the only SHE activity center in San Mateo County.

The Central Recreation Center offers ceramics classes and a ceramics studio in the park in an auxiliary building adjoining the tennis courts.

Closure of the recreation center was first proposed in 2003.

The three proposed 2014 updates to the Central Park Master Plan would demolish the existing the recreation center; only one proposal calls for rebuilding the recreation center. Other informal proposals have been advanced to relocate SHE to either the yet-to-be-completed Bay Meadows Park or the existing city senior center on Alameda de las Pulgas, which would decrease access for seniors, who typically have limited options for private automobiles and public transit.

=== Fitzgerald Field (baseball) ===
Fitzgerald Field
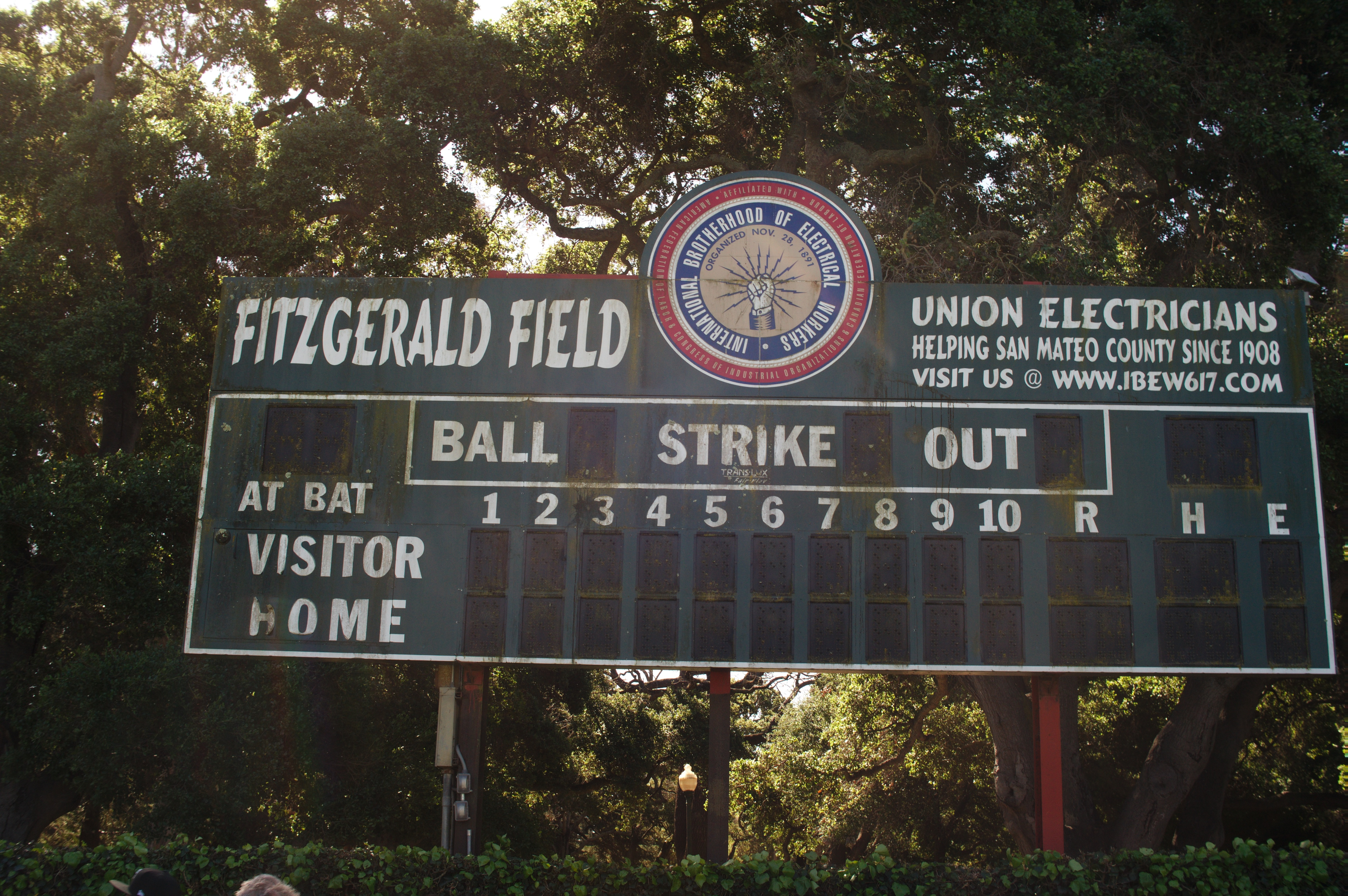
- Scoreboard at Fitzgerald Field
- Interactive map of Fitzgerald Field
- Full name: Justin "Fitz" Fitzgerald Memorial Field
- Owner: City of San Mateo
- Seating type: bleachers
- Capacity: 1,500
- Type: Stadium
- Event: Baseball
- Surface: grass
- Scoreboard: Electronic
- Field size: Left field: 294 feet (90 m); Center field: 368 feet (112 m); Right field: 294 feet (90 m)

Construction
- Built: 1922

Tenants
- San Mateo Blues (1924–1941; 1948–1978)

One of the earliest features at Central Park is the baseball field in the western corner, laid out at the inception of Central Park in 1922. San Mateo's semiprofessional baseball team, the Blues, played at the field from 1924 to 1941, interrupted by World War II, and resumed play in 1948 until the team was disbanded in 1978.

Prior to their move to Central Park, the Blues played as an amateur team starting in 1898 at what is now the Martin Luther King Center north of downtown. When they moved to Central Park in 1924, the Blues participated as a semiprofessional team in the California State League, winning several championships during the 1920s and 30s. Justin "Fitz" Fitzgerald managed the Blues between 1924 and 1935 after his major-league playing career ended. Light stands were added to the field in 1935, and the grandstand has a capacity of approximately 1,100 people. The field was dedicated for Fitzgerald on August 21, 1960, commemorated by a plaque on the grandstand's exterior wall.

Reputedly, Barry Bonds would hit home runs from Fitzgerald Field across bordering El Camino Real while playing high school baseball for Serra.

Some proposals in the 2014 Master Plan update included the removal of Fitzgerald Field, which was opposed by local little league officials. The San Mateo City Council showed strong support for retaining Fitzgerald Field in 2015.

=== Tennis courts ===
Central Park has six lighted tennis courts on the roof of a single-level garage parking structure (built 1963). In 2007, a proposal to demolish and replace the parking structure was advanced, as it was considered seismically unsafe, but the existing structure was reprieved in 2009 with a retrofit plan. The retrofitting contract was awarded in 2010.

All three of the proposed 2014 updates to the Central Park Master Plan would remove the tennis courts in favor of plazas or open space to provide a more formal park entrance. The proposed updates address a criticism that the tennis courts (along with the Fitzgerald Field grandstand) form a barrier between downtown and the rest of Central Park.

=== Japanese Tea Garden ===
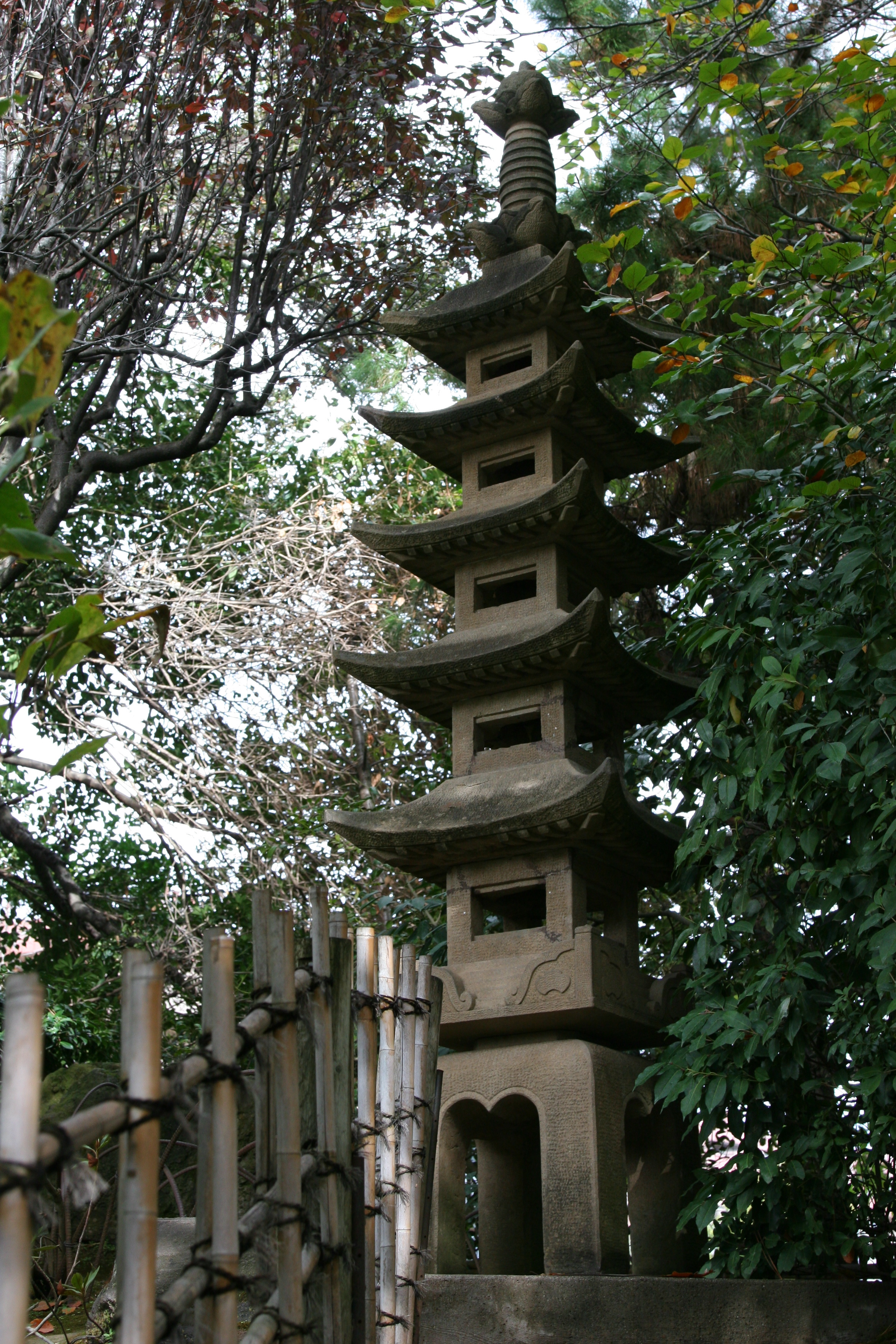
The 1963 Toyonaka pagoda

The Japanese Tea Garden was designed by Nagao Sakurai and was installed in 1966. Plants featured in the garden include cherry trees, Japanese maples and bonsai. San Mateo set up a sister-city relationship with Toyonaka in 1963, and Toyonaka has donated several sculptures which can be seen in the Tea Garden, including the five-level stone pagoda statue (installed 1963) and a small shinden shrine (in 1991, for the Tea Garden's 25th anniversary). In addition, the Japanese Tea Garden structures include the surrounding fence, a traditional gazebo (azumaya), and a teahouse (chashitsu). The tea garden is open limited hours.

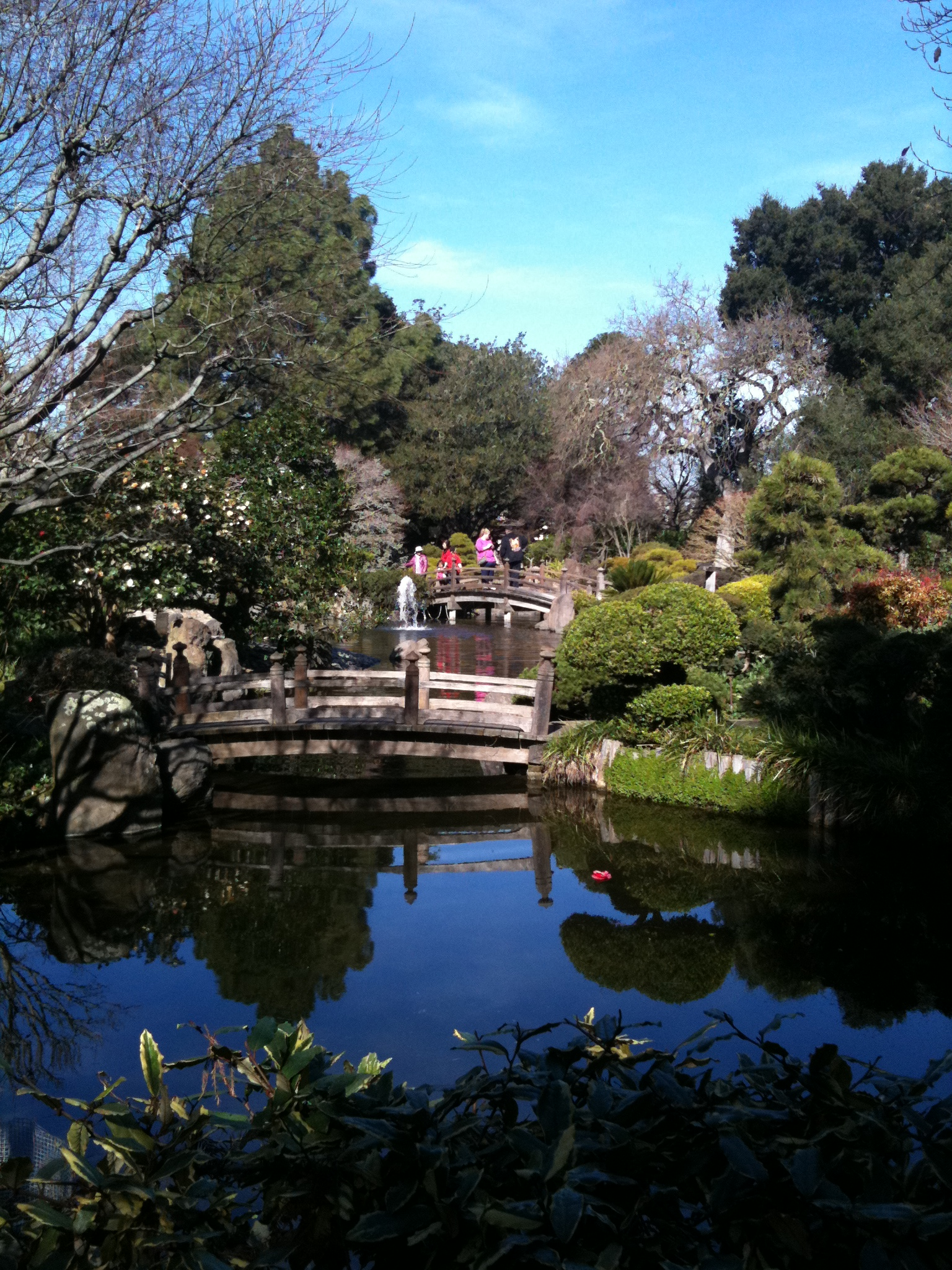
View of pond and bridges.

=== Children's playground ===
The children's playground at Central Park features a wood-and-steel play structure along with steel climbing equipment in a large sandbox. A nearby miniature railway runs in a loop.

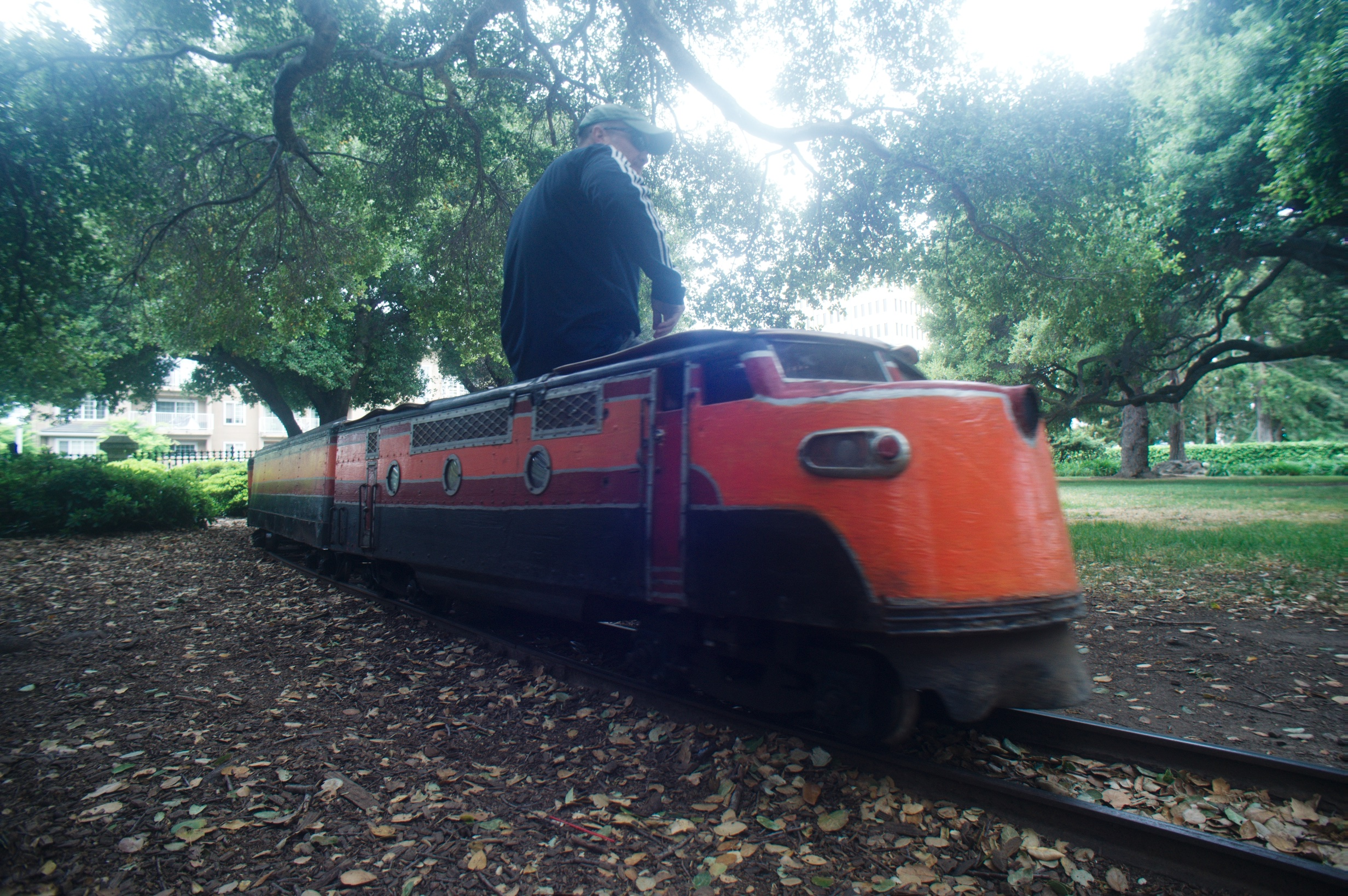
Children's train

The miniature railway, running since May 10, 1948, now runs an Arrow Development locomotive on 12-inch (30 cm) gauge track. The Arrow Streamliner locomotive was originally built in 1953 and later converted to battery power. It replaced an Ottaway steam locomotive from the founders of Joyland Amusement Park (Wichita, Kansas). It can accommodate 10 children. Rides are $2 each. The train operator also occasionally opens the snack bar in the Fitzgerald Field grandstands. The miniature train is painted in the Southern Pacific "Daylight" livery.

=== San Mateo Arboretum ===
Within the main area of the park is a rose garden with gazebo, popular for photos and weddings, and nearby is a meeting space for the San Mateo Arboretum Society. The San Mateo Arboretum Society was founded in 1974, and undertook the restoration of the adjoining Kohl pumphouse, which now serves as its meeting place and headquarters, in 1976. The rose garden was planted and is maintained by Arboretum Society volunteers.

=== Sculptures and historic structures ===
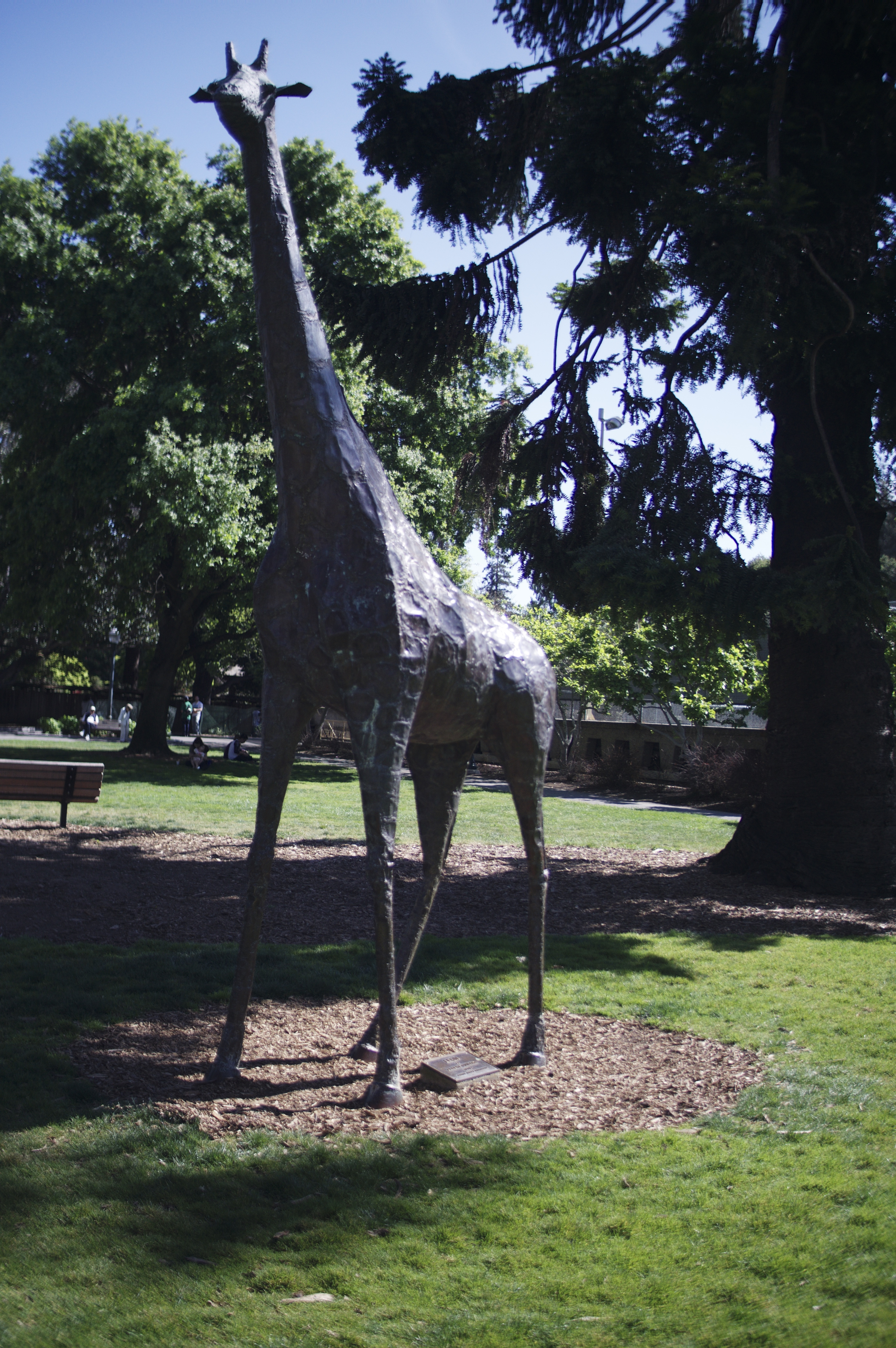
Leon, the copper giraffe by Guibara (1978)

Albert Guibara sculpted a life-size giraffe statue by brazing copper plates together, named Leon, in honor of his father's 80th birthday. It was installed in 1978 and can be seen on the park's northeast lawn, by the corner of 5th and Laurel (37.5628°N 122.3222°W).

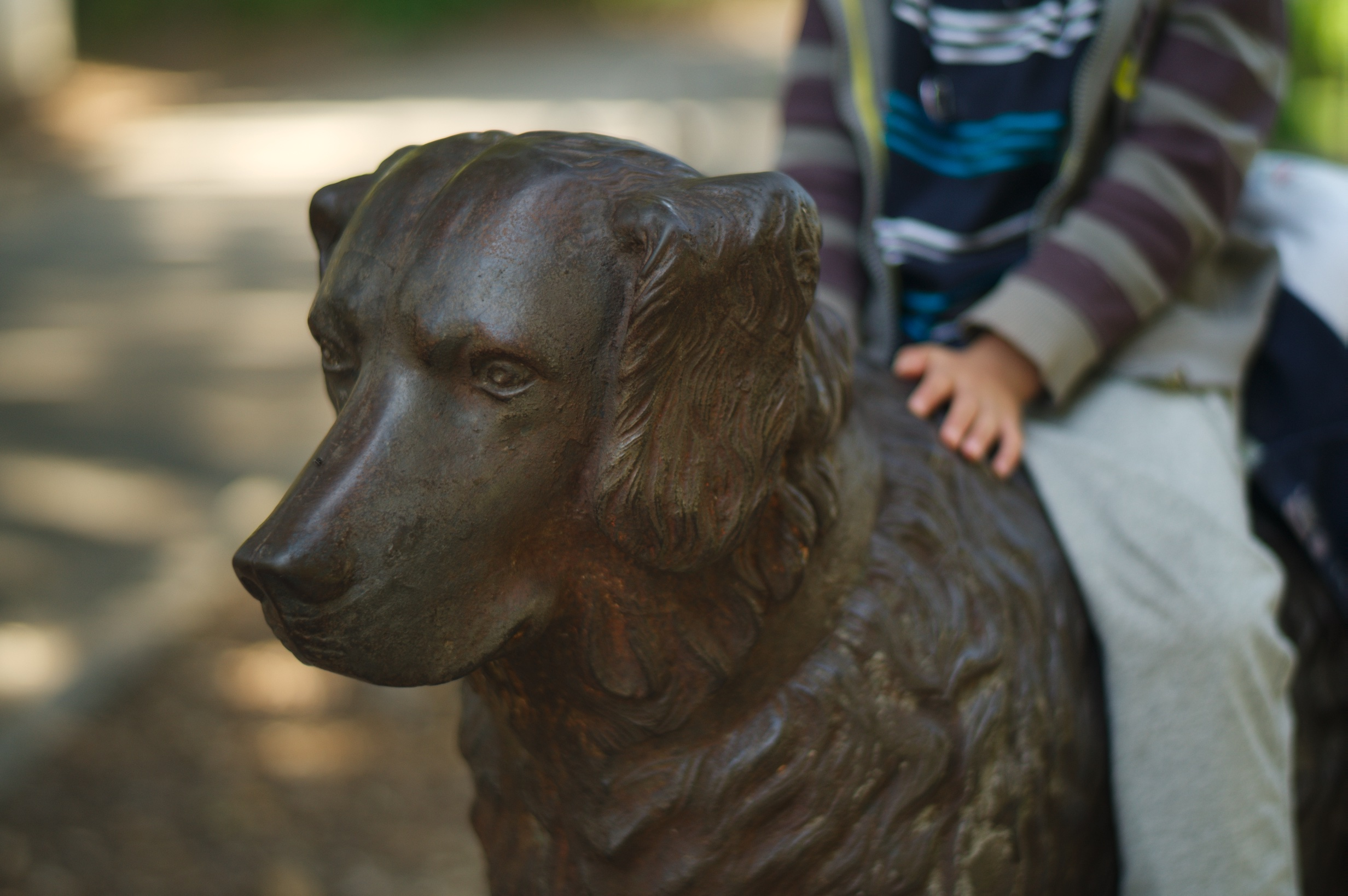
The iron dog statue is popular with children

An Italian cast-iron statue of a dog dates back to Kohl's ownership of the property and can be seen on the south side of the park, near the Arboretum and the 9th Avenue entrance. The wrought-iron fence fronting the park along El Camino Real also dates to Kohl's time. The Kohl pumphouse is the only building left from Kohl's ownership of the property.

== Regular events ==
Since 1979, a five-game little league exhibition baseball series has been held between San Mateo and Toyonaka all-stars biennially. San Mateo and Toyonaka trade hosting duties, and the final game is held at Fitzgerald Field in the years that San Mateo hosts the series.

On Thursday nights during the summer, Central Park hosts the Central Park Music Series, a series of free concerts featuring live music from Bay Area-based performers. 2024 featured eight concert dates, and 2025 is planned to have eight dates as well. The only year skipped was 2020, due to the COVID-19 pandemic.

The City of San Mateo holds the Eggstravaganza egg hunt and parade early each spring at Central Park.

Other holidays and events are celebrated at the park, year round including: San Mateo Bacon & Brew Festival (October), Holiday Floral Art Show (December), San Mateo on Ice (Ice Skating Rink from November until January), and various San Mateo Arboretum Society events (all year round).

== History ==
In 1854, Charles B. Polhemus, then the director of the San Francisco and San Jose Railroad, purchased the land which would later become Central Park; he built a mansion on the grounds in keeping with the fashion of wealthy San Franciscans to establish an estate on the Peninsula. Polhemus is credited with laying out the downtown core of San Mateo in September 1863 alongside the newly completed railroad.

In 1880, William Kohl, founder of the Alaska Commercial Company, acquired Polhemus's estate and had it landscaped by John McLaren and William O'Farrell with trees and a 900-foot (270 m) long stone and iron fence along El Camino Real. Many of Kohl's trees have survived along with the fence and can be seen in present-day Central Park. The only other surviving structures built between 1890 and 1910 are the Kohl pumphouse and the pony shed.

The 13-room Victorian mansion was later inherited by Kohl's son, Charles Frederick, and Frederick Kohl lived there while building his own estate in Burlingame. Kohl's Burlingame estate and mansion, the Kohl Mansion, completed in 1914, have been the site of Mercy High School since 1931.

The City of San Mateo acquired the first 16 acres (6 ha) of land from C. Frederick Kohl's estate in 1922 via a bond measure of US$80,000 (equivalent to $1,540,000 in 2025), establishing it as the first public park in San Mateo; the baseball field was one of the first amenities laid out. An additional 0.5 acres (0.20 ha) were added in 1926.

San Mateo Junior College occupied the former Kohl mansion on the park grounds near the northern corner of 5th and Laurel from 1923–1927. After the College moved to the former home of San Mateo High School on Baldwin Avenue, the mansion was demolished in 1928.

Many of the park's current amenities, including the playground, recreation center, and tennis courts were installed while Stanley Pitcher was serving as Superintendent of Parks (1937–1969).

=== Master Plan update ===
The City of San Mateo unveiled three proposals in 2014 to update the Central Park Master Plan:

- Recreation Center option: a new, expanded recreation center would be built on the site of the current tennis courts with additional underground parking, and the Fitzgerald Field grandstand would be downsized in favor of publicly-accessible art studios replacing those in the current recreation center.
- Enhanced Open Space option: the current recreation center would be replaced with an open lawn and bandshell, and the tennis courts would be replaced with a large plaza atop expanded underground parking.
- Community Gathering option: Fitzgerald Field would be removed and replaced with a large lawn and the current recreation center would be replaced with a pavilion.

The changes to the Master Plan attracted negative publicity, mainly for the proposed removal of longstanding amenities.
