= Marilyn Lacey =

American nonprofit executive

Marilyn Lacey RSM
- Born: July 11, 1948 (age 78)
- Occupations: Executive director, Mercy Beyond Borders
- Writing career
- Notable work: This Flowing Toward Me
- Notable awards: "Unsung Hero of Compassion" awarded by the Dalai Lama

Marilyn Lacey, RSM is the founder and executive director of Mercy Beyond Borders, a non-profit organization that partners with displaced women and children overseas to alleviate their poverty. A California native, Lacey has been a Sister of Mercy since 1966.

Since 1980, Lacey has worked with refugees in the U.S., Africa, and Southeast Asia. She has dedicated her life to making the world a more welcoming place for persons forced to leave their homelands because of war or persecution. For many years she directed programs for refugees and immigrants, including the resettlement of the Lost Boys of Sudan at Catholic Charities in San Jose.

In 2001, Lacey was honored by the Dalai Lama as an "Unsung Hero of Compassion” and in Spring 2009 Ave Maria Press released her memoir, This Flowing Toward Me: A Story of God Arriving in Strangers. She holds a master's degree in social work from the University of California, Berkeley.

== Biography ==
Lacey was born on July 11, 1948, in San Francisco, California. After graduating from Mercy High School in Burlingame in 1966, she went on to receive a Bachelor of Arts degree (B.A.) from Russell College in Burlingame.

In 1966, Lacey joined the Sisters of Mercy and became a high school math and theology teacher. In 1979, Lacey volunteered at San Francisco International Airport, helping refugees from Southeast Asia make their connecting flights to the communities in America where they were being resettled. This in motion a career change for Lacey and thrust her into international refugee work, initially in the Lao-Thai border camps, and later in Africa.

In 1984, Lacey obtained a master's degree in social work (M.S.W.) from the University of California, Berkeley. While a graduate student there, she wrote a paper discussing the shifts in U.S. refugee policies since World War II; in 1987 it was published as Chapter 1 in People in Upheaval. Lacey also conducted a national study of AmerAsian refugee youth, "In Our Fathers’ Land", that was published by the United States Conference of Catholic Bishops in 1986 and distributed to refugee resettlement sites nationwide.

In 1985, she became Director of Refugee Services for Catholic Charities in San Jose, California. Catholic Charities provides refugee resettlement services, employment placement for newcomers, foster care for refugee minors, and legal assistance to immigrants. During her tenure, Catholic Charities expanded its immigration programs to include services for language and financial literacy, naturalization, family visa petitions, political asylum, deportation defense, and help to those who can not afford private legal counsel. Her office was involved in the 1986 amnesty program and provided education and public awareness regarding Proposition 187. She has also served as a member of the board of directors for Mercy Housing California and for Mercy Hospital, Bakersfield.

Lacey has spent time in war-ravaged places, including the Lao-Thai border, Sudanese and Somali camps in Kenya, and with internally displaced persons in the Eastern Equatoria region of Sudan. She has also worked with the Lost Boys of Sudan, helping them to resettle in the United States.

In 2001 she was honored by the Dalai Lama as an "Unsung Hero of Compassion" for her life of service with refugees.

After 21 years of working for Catholic Charities, Lacey started Mercy Beyond Borders in 2008; its mission is to partner with displaced women and children overseas in ways that help them move up from extreme poverty.

Lacey presents to groups and schools throughout the U.S. on refugee and migration issues. In 2009 Ave Maria Press published her memoir This Flowing Toward Me: A Story of God Arriving in Strangers.

In 2011, Lacey received an honorary doctorate of humane letters from Saint Joseph's College of Maine. In 2017 she was the recipient of the Opus Prize from Regis University in Denver, Colorado, which carries with it a $1 million stipend for her work.

== Works ==
- This Flowing Toward Me: A Story of God Arriving in Strangers.(Ave Maria Press, 2009)
- "A Case Study in International Refugee Policy: Lowland Lao Refugees" in Scott Morgan and Elizabeth Colson, eds. People in Upheaval. (Staten Island, NY: Center for Migration Studies, 1987) ISBN 0-934733-17-1
