= Willsborough (disambiguation) =

Willsborough or similar terms may refer to:

- Willsborough, a townland in County Tipperary, Ireland
- Willesborough, suburb of Ashford, Kent, England
- Willborough, Burlingame Terrace, Burlingame, California, United States, a neighborhood
- Willsboro, New York, a town in upstate New York
  - Willsboro (CDP), New York, a hamlet within the town
