= CarWoo =

Car shopping website

- Type: Private
- Industry: Automotive
- Founded: 2010
- Founder: Tommy McClung
- Defunct: 2014
- Fate: Closed
- Successor: TrueCar
- Headquarters: Burlingame, California, U.S.
- Services: Online car marketplace

CarWoo was an online new car shopping pricing and information website that allowed consumers to buy cars by negotiating with car dealers in a semi-anonymous online reverse auction. CarWoo, whose logo also appears as CarWoo!, was a competitor to TrueCar, which was a similar but negotiation-free car buying platform.

== Operations ==
Carwoo was an anonymous automobile marketplace that enabled its users to purchase cars without providing personal information to dealers until after an offer was made and accepted. Once a buyer accepted an offer, their information was transferred to the dealer. Rather than buyers bidding up the price, salespeople bid the selling price lower.

== History ==
CarWoo was founded in Burlingame, California by Tommy McClung, a serial entrepreneur who previously co-founded IMSafer. They received seed money and advice from Y Combinator.

On October 13, 2010 the firm launched their marketplace and received a Series A round of financing, $6 Million, led by Interwest Partners, Comcast Interactive Capital, Blumberg Capital, Accelerator Ventures, Raymond Tonsing and Dillon McDonald. In 2011, the firm received a Series B round of funding in the amount of $6 million, mostly from the same investors. By the end of 2011, their network included 11,000 car dealerships. By July 2012, this figure grew to over 13,000.

In 2013 McClung announced CarWoo needed at least an additional $50 million to sustain their growth rate and remain in business. He would spend most of 2013 travelling to major investors trying to secure this additional operating capital.

Attempts to raise additional capital repeatedly failed, and on January 20, 2014 the firm closed. Its assets were acquired by TrueCar, their leading competitor. TrueCar also hired nine employees, including McClung, who was later promoted to Chief Technology and Product Officer at TrueCar, Inc.
