= Burlingame School District =

School district in California, United States

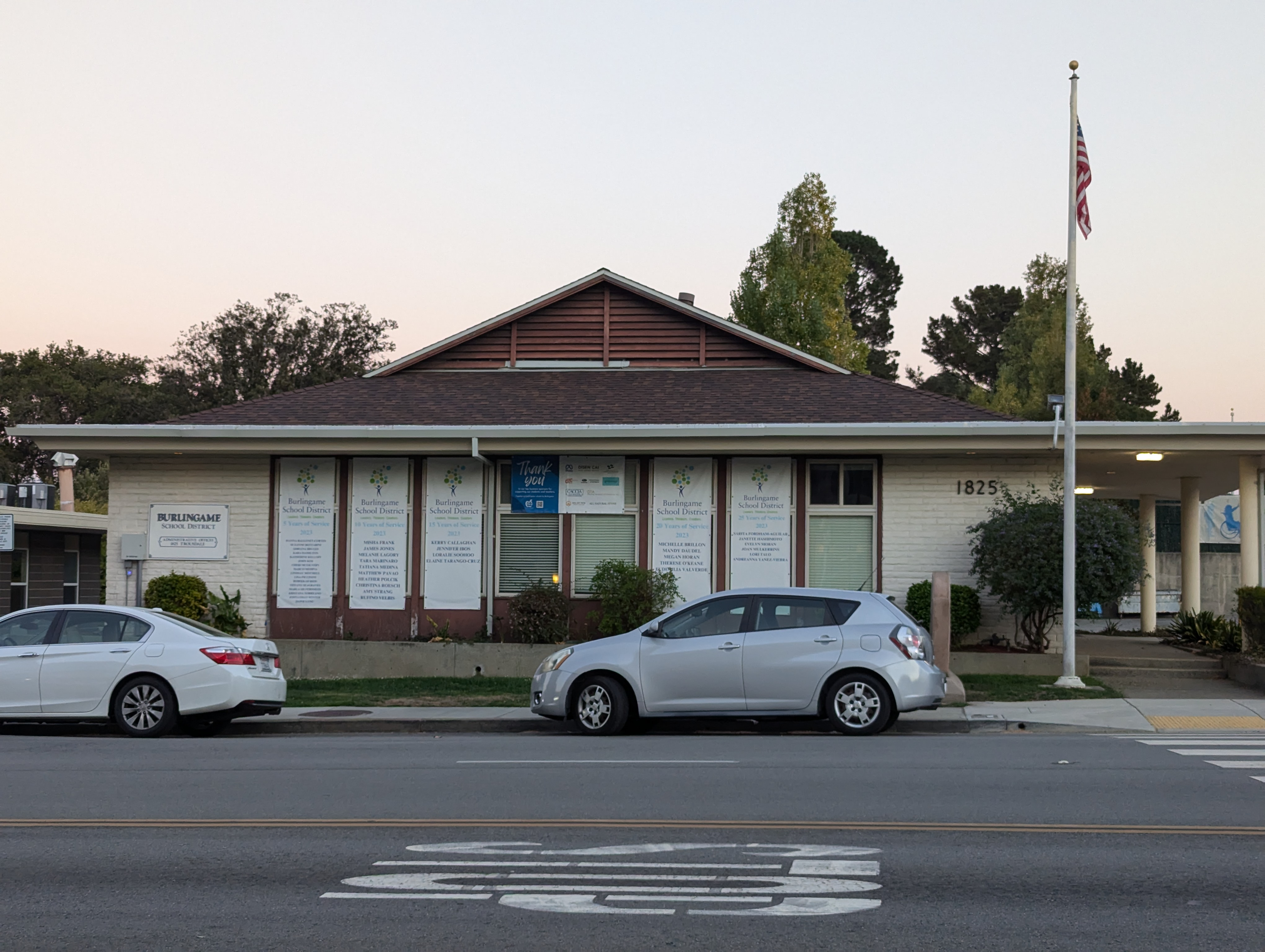

Address
- 1825 Trousdale Dr. Burlingame, California, 94010; United States

District information
- Type: Public
- Grades: K–8
- Superintendent: Dr. Marla Silversmith
- NCES District ID: 0606480

Students and staff
- Students: 3,312
- Teachers: 148.91
- Staff: 90.20
- Student–teacher ratio: 22.24

Other information
- Website: www.burlingameschools.org

Burlingame School District is a public school district in Burlingame, California, in the San Francisco Bay Area. Its schools serve students in kindergarten through 8th grade. It oversees 7 schools.

== History ==
The Burlingame School District has a rich history that traces back to the aftermath of the 1906 earthquake in San Francisco. The earthquake prompted a significant population increase in Burlingame, from around 200 residents before the disaster to approximately 1000 in 1907. Prior to this surge, Burlingame's children were educated through the county at the Burlingame School on Peninsula Avenue and County Road (El Camino), which was constructed in 1906 and later renamed Peninsula Avenue Schools.

The desire for a dedicated school district led Burlingame residents to vote in favor of its establishment in 1911. Plans were set in motion to build a permanent school, designed by renowned architect William H. Weeks. In 1912, during construction, a temporary 8-room schoolhouse known as "the little red schoolhouse" was erected on Howard and Primrose streets.

In September 1913, the first permanent Burlingame School opened on the corner of Oak Grove and Grange (now Paloma Avenue). Known as Burlingame Grammar School, the brick building featured columns on the front, a hallmark of Weeks' architectural style.

== Schools ==
Schools within the district are Burlingame Intermediate School (6th–8th), Franklin Elementary School, Hoover Elementary School, Lincoln Elementary School, McKinley Elementary School, Roosevelt Elementary School, and Washington Elementary School.

== Mascots ==
Burlingame Intermediate School - Trojans

Franklin Elementary School - Falcons

Lincoln Elementary School - Lions

Hoover Elementary School - Hawks

Roosevelt Elementary School - Bears

Washington Elementary School - Wildcats

McKinley Elementary School - Bulldogs
