= Pat DeCola =

Sports writer and columnist (born 1987)

- Born: Patrick T. DeCola; June 30, 1987 (age 38); Lawrence, Massachusetts
- Education: Saint Joseph's College of Maine; B.A. in Communications
- Occupations: Sports columnist Sports reporter Editor/Producer

Pat DeCola (born June 30, 1987, in Lawrence, Massachusetts) is an American sports reporter for NASCAR.

== Biography ==
DeCola attended Saint Joseph's College of Maine in Standish, Maine, and graduated with a B.A. in communications in 2009. He is currently Senior Manager, Editorial Content for NASCAR.com. He was previously a writer for Fox Sports.

DeCola joined Fox Sports in 2009 and wrote for FOXSports.com and its regional sites until March 2012 before agreeing to join Sportradar US later that month.

He worked at the New Hampshire Union Leader as a sports reporter beginning in 2010, but left in January 2013 to aid in the re-launch of NASCAR.com under NASCAR Digital Media.

In August 2012, DeCola joined Bleacher Report as a Featured Columnist.

From April 2012 to July 2012, DeCola worked with blogger, political commentator, and author Michelle Malkin as a contributing editor on her Twitter curation site, Twitchy.com.

DeCola also played guitar and sang in the now-defunct indie rock band The Cantstanjas.
