= Fred Lyon =

American photographer (1924–2022)

- Born: Frederick George Lyon Jr. September 27, 1924; San Francisco, California, U.S.
- Died: August 22, 2022 (aged 97); San Francisco, California, U.S.
- Education: ArtCenter College of Design
- Years active: 1940s–2017
- Known for: Photography
- Spouse(s): Anne (née Murray), Penelope Whelan Rozis
- Children: 2
- Website: Official website

Fred Lyon (September 27, 1924 – August 22, 2022) was an American photographer. He was known for shots of foggy San Francisco, and photos of San Francisco life from the 1940s to the 1960s. Lyon worked in different roles within photography, including as a military photographer, a photojournalist, a fashion photographer, landscape photographer, and as a street photographer. His nocturnal San Francisco photography was often compared with Hungarian–French photographer Brassaï.

== Early life and education ==
Fred Lyon was born on September 27, 1924, at St. Luke's Hospital in San Francisco, California. His father had farming interests and a 18,000-acre ranch in the San Joaquin Valley. He was raised in San Carlos and Burlingame. He got his first camera at age 12. As a teenager he started practicing photography, and at age 15 he got his first job as a photographer's assistant at the Moulin Studios.

After high school at age 17, he enrolled at Art Center School in Los Angeles (now ArtCenter College of Design). One summer Lyon studied under Ansel Adams, who taught at ArtCenter.

== Career ==
After the Pearl Harbor attack, around 1943, Lyon dropped out of college and enrolled in the United States Navy with the intention of becoming a pilot, but instead he worked as a military photographer. In his role as military photographer, Lyon photographed the Roosevelt family portrait, and was witness to Harry S. Truman’s first day as president.

After the war he lived in New York City, working as a fashion photographer. In either 1947 or 1948, he had his first photo magazine assignment for Homes and Gardens. He briefly worked for fashion houses in New York City, as well as worked as a freelance photographer for Vogue, Glamour, and Life magazines. His first wife was model Anne (née Murray), who posed in many of his early images.

The couple eventually moved to San Francisco. In 1949, he had a solo exhibition titled, Photographs by Fred G. Lyon, Jr. at the San Francisco Museum of Modern Art. In the 1950s, Lyon socialized with Richard Diebenkorn and other painters within the Bay Area Figurative Movement. He would take photographs of San Francisco landmarks including the Golden Gate Bridge, Coit Tower, hotels in Nob Hill and cityscapes, which were often highlighting the fog. Lyon had a love of both old San Francisco, as well as the newer version of the city.

Lyon also had a special interest in photographing vineyards and wineries in nearby Napa and Sonoma. In 2013, the film documentary Fred Lyon: Living Through the Lens was made by filmmaker Michael House.

His last photo was taken when he was in his 90s in 2017 of the 500 Club bar sign in the Mission District.

== Personal life and death ==
"I see pictures I would like to take, I need another lifetime to photograph San Francisco. But my life has been so much fun I can't believe it."

— Fred Lyon,

Lyon's first wife Anne (née Murray), a fashion model, died in 1989. They had two sons, Michael and Gordon. In the 1970s Lyon lived in Sausalito, California.

In 2003, Lyon married interior designer Penelope Whelan Rozis. For many years he lived in the Cow Hollow neighborhood of San Francisco.

Lyon died on August 22, 2022, in his home in San Francisco, he had lung cancer. SFGate remembered him as someone with "one of the longest, most prolific careers of any 20th century photographer."

== Publications ==
- Draper, Margaret F.; Atkinson, Nancy (1952). Ballet for Beginners. Fred Lyon (photography). Alfred A. Knopf.
- Lyon, Fred (1970). A Week In Windley's World: Hawaii. Face to Face Series. Collier-Macmillan. ISBN 9780027615005.
- Gillette, Peter; Gillette, Paul (1974). Playboy's Book Of Wine. Fred Lyon (photography), Playboy Press. The Ridge Press, Inc. ISBN 978-0872234116.
- Lyon, Fred (2017). San Francisco Noir: Photographs by Fred Lyon. Princeton Architectural Press. ISBN 978-1616896515.
- Lyon, Fred (2019). Vineyards: Photographs by Fred Lyon. Princeton Architectural Press. ISBN 978-1616898489.
- Meza, Philip E. (2022). Inventing the California Look: Interiors by Frances Elkins, Michael Taylor, John Dickinson, and Other Design Innovators. Fred Lyon (photography), Jared Goss (forward). Rizzoli Press. ISBN 978-0847871520.
- Unterberger, Richie (2022). Golden, Reuel (ed.). San Francisco. Portrait of a City. Fred Lyon (photography). TASCHEN. ISBN 9783836574853.
