= Saint Joseph's College of Maine =

Catholic college in Standish, Maine, US

Coordinates: 43°49′31.71″N 70°28′55.54″W

- Motto: Fortitudo et Spes
- Motto in English: Courage and Hope
- Type: Private college
- Established: 1912; 114 years ago
- Religious affiliation: Roman Catholic
- Academic affiliations: Space-grant
- President: Joseph L. Cassidy
- Students: 1,463 (fall 2023)
- Undergraduates: 1,059 (fall 2023)
- Postgraduates: 404 (fall 2023)
- Location: Standish, Maine, United States
- Campus: 447 acres (181 ha)
- Colors: Royal Blue & White
- Nickname: Monks
- Sporting affiliations: NCAA Division III; GNAC, NAC
- Website: sjcme.edu

Saint Joseph's College of Maine is a private Catholic college in Standish, Maine, United States. It is the only Catholic college in Maine. The college has a longstanding specialization in nursing education. Its Jeanne Donlevy Arnold Center for Nursing Innovation features five simulation laboratories designed to provide hands-on training in a range of healthcare settings.

== History ==
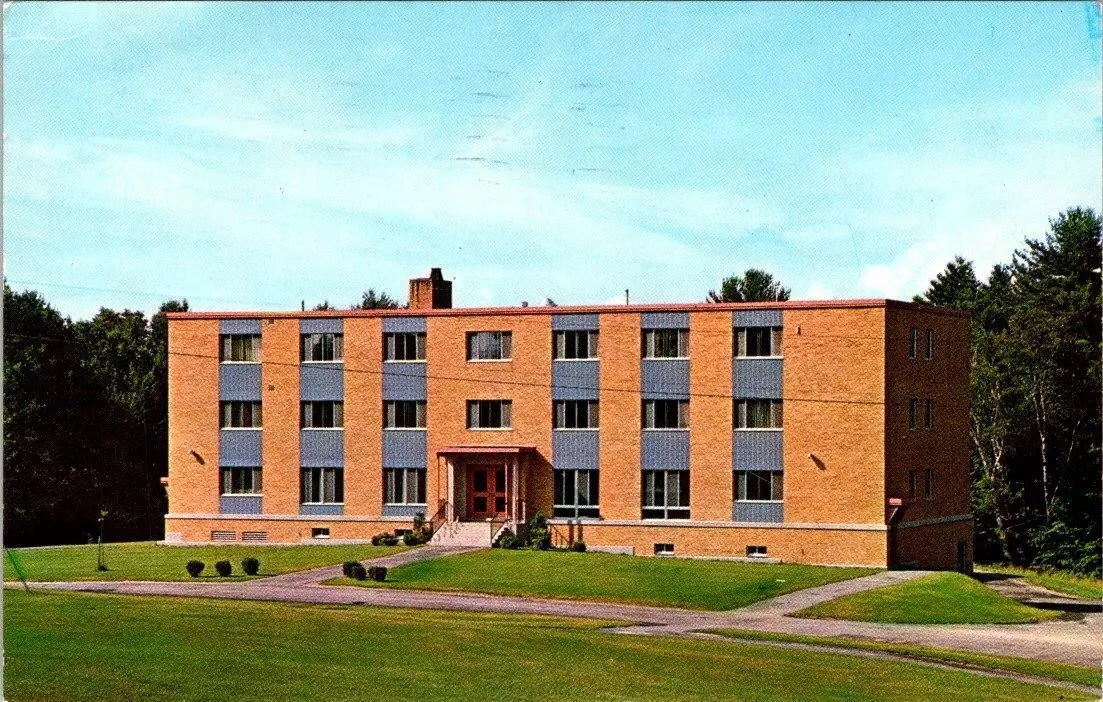
The College in 1970

Saint Joseph's was founded by the Sisters of Mercy in 1912 as a women's college. The college, run by a lay and religious Board of Trustees, was located on the convent grounds in nearby Portland until 1956 when it moved to its lakeside location in Standish. In 1970, Saint Joseph's became coeducational and six years later began a distance education program for working adults.

== Academics ==
On campus, the college offers more than 40 majors, minors and partnership programs. The average class size is 14. The student-to-faculty ratio is 11:1. On campus, the college offers undergraduate programs in the liberal arts and sciences, as well as professional programs. The most popular majors are nursing, business, education, exercise science/sports management, and biology.

=== Accreditation and approvals ===
The college is accredited by the New England Commission of Higher Education. The nursing program is also approved by the Maine State Board of Nursing and accredited by the Commission on Collegiate Nursing Education. The Elementary Education and Physical Education majors and the Secondary Education minor are approved by the state of Maine.

Since 2013, an annual 5k race is held to finance a scholarship for nursing students at Saint Joseph's in honor of Matthew Rairdon, a graduate in emergency nursing, who was murdered by his former boyfriend in Westbrook, Maine, in November 2013.

== Student life ==
=== Honor societies ===
- Delta Epsilon Sigma, a national scholastic honor society for students of Catholic colleges and universities, has been at Saint Joseph's College since 1950.
- Sigma Theta Tau International is the nursing honor society and exists to promote the development, dissemination and utilization of nursing knowledge. Sigma Theta Tau is committed to improving the health of people worldwide through increasing the scientific base of nursing practice. The Kappa Zeta chapter-at-large of Sigma Theta Tau was chartered at Saint Joseph's College in April 1988.

=== Athletics ===
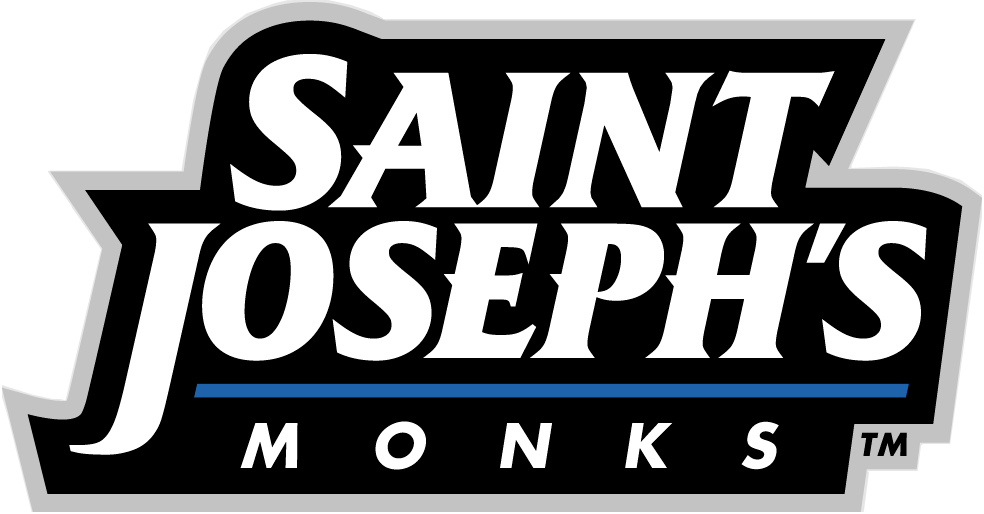
St. Joseph's Monks wordmark

Saint Joseph's College teams are known as the Monks. The college fields NCAA Division III sport in soccer, track and field, volleyball (women only), swimming, basketball, golf, field hockey, baseball, softball, lacrosse, and cross country. The college is a member of the Great Northeast Athletic Conference (GNAC), the Eastern College Athletic Conference (ECAC). Intramural teams include everything from basketball to bowling; club sports include dance team, cheerleading, ice hockey and ultimate Frisbee.

The athletic center is equipped with a full gym, indoor track, pool, and dance/aerobics room. The 2012 SJC baseball team was ranked 14th in the country in the DIII NCAA ranking. The baseball rankings for the 2013 season was projecting SJC at 12th in the country. With a win against #1 Wheaton College, the Monks moved up to #9 in the country.

== Notable alumni ==
- Pat DeCola (2009), sportswriter
- Randy Freer (1982), television executive
- Charlie Furbush, professional baseball player
- Andrea Gibson, poet and activist
- Marilyn Lacey, religious sister and director and founder of Mercy Beyond Borders
- Craig Luschenat, Boston Celtics assistant coach
- Bonnie Newman, administrator and business executive
- Sheri Piers, distance runner

== See also ==
- Timeline of women's colleges in the United States
- Great Northeast Athletic Conference
- North Atlantic Conference
- List of NCAA Division III institutions
- Harold Alfond
- Frank Fixaris
