= Leon Gilmour =

Russian Empire-born American printmaker (1907–1996)

- Born: July 25, 1907; Riga, Russian Empire (now Latvia)
- Died: March 31, 1996 (aged 88); Burlingame, California, U.S.
- Resting place: Forest Lawn Memorial Park, Glendale, California, U.S.
- Education: School of Practical Art, Otis College of Art and Design
- Occupation(s): Designer, visual artist, illustrator, art director, printmaker
- Years active: 1930s–1980s
- Known for: Wood engraving
- Movement: Regionalism, Social realist
- Spouse: Helen Bernice Gilmour

Leon Gilmour (1907–1996) was a Russian-born American visual artist, designer, teacher, illustrator, and laborer. He is best known for his social realist, wood engravings featuring laborers, or the California landscape and nature. His work is often associated with the Regionalist artists.

== Biography ==
Leon Gilmour was born on July 25, 1907, in Riga, Russian Empire (now Latvia). He immigrated to the United States through Ellis Island in March 1916, at the age of nine.

Early in his career he studied at the School of Practical Art in Boston (now Lesley University). Gilmour held a series of labor jobs in order to support himself, including working as a: construction worker in New York City, field hand in the Midwest, gold miner in Colorado, and as a truck driver in Los Angeles, California. In 1931, Gilmour moved to Los Angeles to attend Otis College of Art and Design and studied wood engraving with artist Paul Landacre. In 1933 he worked for Public Works of Art Project and later for the through the succeeding government program, the Federal Art Project (FAP).

He taught classes at the University of Southern California and had later careers as a designer, illustrator, and art director. In 1951, he moved to the San Francisco Bay Area to act as art director for the H.S. Crocker Lithography Company. He was a member of the American Artist's Congress. Together with his wife Helen they had a son, Lawrence Gilmour.

== Death and legacy ==
Gilmour died on March 31, 1996, in Burlingame, California.

Gilmour is included in Edan Milton Hughes book, "Artists in California, 1786–1940". His son Lawrence and a grandson, Zach Gilmour, are printmakers in Northern California.

== Collections ==
Gilmour's artwork is featured in many public art collections and museums, including: Smithsonian American Art Museum, Fine Arts Museums of San Francisco (FAMSF) within the Achenbach Foundation for Graphic Arts department, Crystal Bridges Museum of American Art, National Gallery of Art, Mercantile Library at the University of Missouri–St. Louis, San Jose Museum of Art, Columbus Museum of Art, New Britain Museum of American Art, Flint Institute of Arts, and many others.

== Exhibitions ==
- 2009 – California in Relief: A History in Wood and Linocut Prints at Hearst Art Gallery, curated by Art Hazelwood, Hearst Art Gallery at Saint Mary's College of California, Moraga, California
- 2010 – Three Generations of California Printmakers: The Works of Leon, Lawrence and Zachary Gilmour, San Geronimo Valley Community Center, San Geronimo, California
- 2014 – International Wood Engraving Invitational, Davidson Galleries, Seattle, Washington
- 2017–2018 – Crossroads: American Scene Prints from Thomas Hart Benton to Grant Wood, San Jose Museum of Art, San Jose, California
