= Burlingame Terrace, Burlingame, California =

Coordinates: 37.5838°N 122.3603°W

Burlingame Terrace is a residential subdivision in Burlingame, California, bounded by Oak Grove Ave, Broadway Ave, El Camino Real and California Drive.

== Development ==
Surveyed and laid out in October 1905, the original subdivision ended at Edgehill Drive. Archibald and Smith marketed the neighborhood as "The Best of Them All". The development's population grew quickly after the 1906 San Francisco earthquake sent the city's population south along the electric car and Pacific Railroad tracks to Peninsula cities. Original marketing materials boasted of "undesirable buildings are not desired in the Terrace. No stores, saloons, laundries, etc., allowed. No house to cost less than $1750."

== Attractions and characteristics ==
Burlingame Terrace borders two of the main Burlingame downtown areas: Broadway Avenue and Burlingame Avenue. Paloma Playground is a small jungle-gym in the neighborhood, and across California Ave is Washington Park and the Jules Francard Grove of heritage Eucalyptus trees. The neighborhood also contains a European-style Tudor Revival village at Willborough Road and Neuchatel Ave.
