= Kohl Mansion =

- U.S. National Register of Historic Places
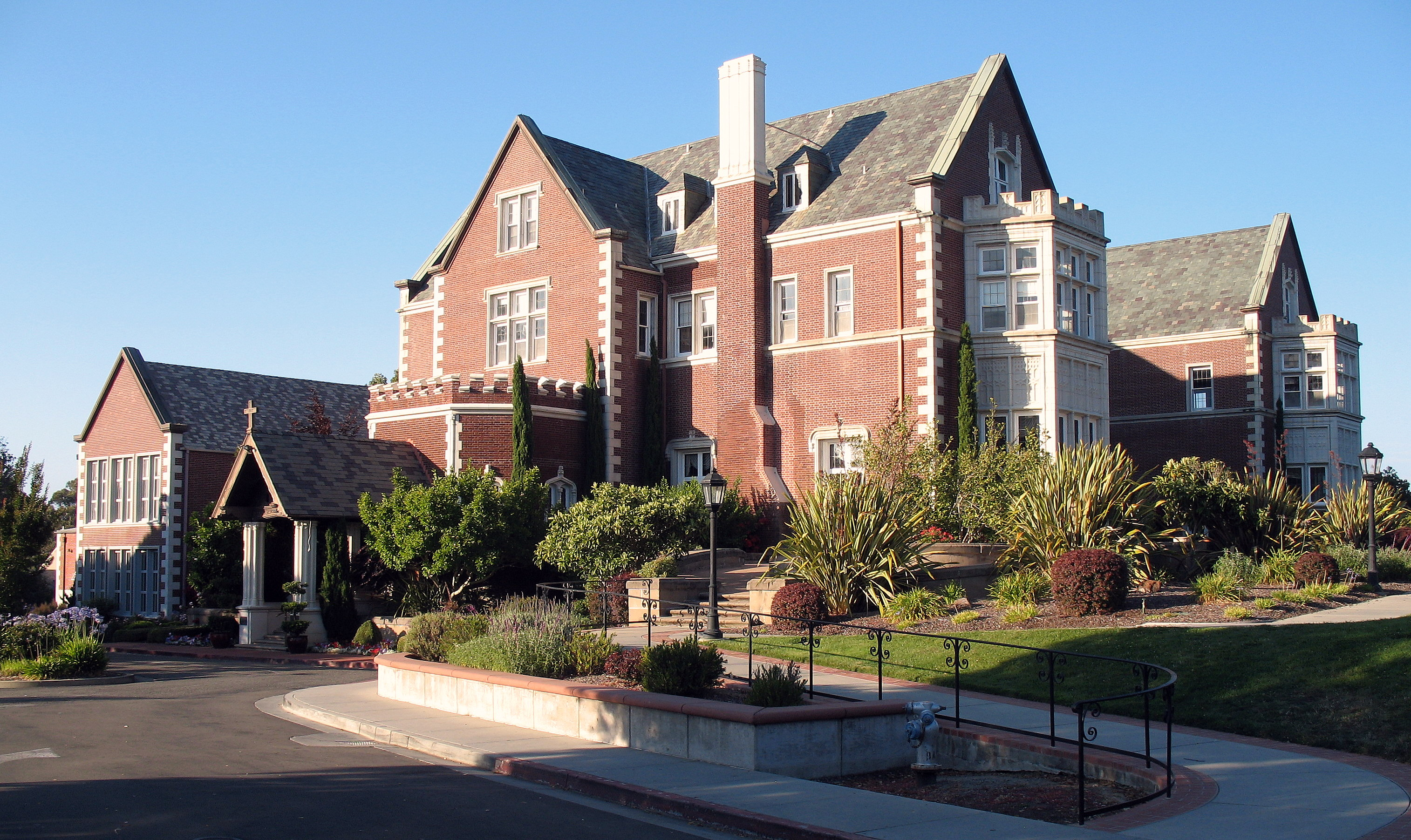

- Location within San Francisco Bay Area Location within California Location within the United States
- Location: 2750 Adeline Drive, Burlingame, California
- Coordinates: 37.583502°N 122.383192°W
- Area: 40 acres (16 ha)
- Architects: George H. Howard, of Howard and White firm
- Architectural style: English Tudor Revival, Jacobethan Revival
- NRHP reference No.: 82002258
- Added to NRHP: 1982

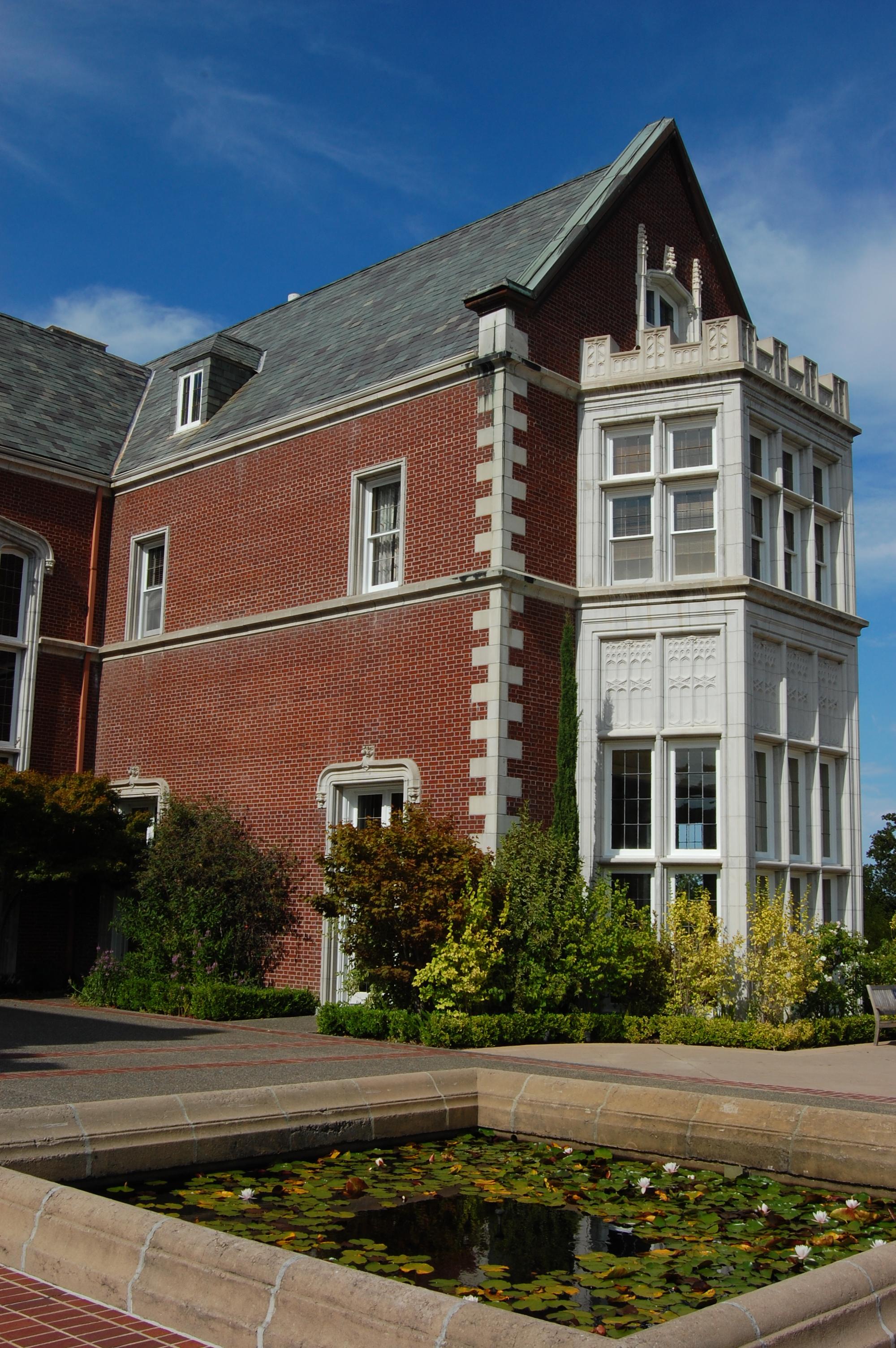

Kohl Mansion, also known as The Oaks, was built in 1914 and is located at 2750 Adeline Drive in Burlingame, California. It was listed on the National Register of Historic Places for its architecture and social and cultural significance to the local area in 1982. The Kohl Mansion is open to the public for events and is used for weddings.

== History ==
=== Architecture and the estate ===
The English Tudor revival mansion was built for Charles Frederick Kohl and his second wife Mary Elisabeth "Bessie" (née Godey), as their country house. The building was completed in 1914 by architect George H. Howard (1864–1935) and engineer John White, of the Howard and White firm. The forty-acre estate included a brick structure with a gabled roof and approximately 42,000 square feet of interior space, 63 rooms, three stories tall and with a basement. The grounds of the estate included a rolling landscape, a sunken English rose garden, tennis courts, green houses, large carriage house, and a 150,000 gallon water reservoir.

=== Kohl family ===
Charles Frederick Kohl's father was William Kohl, he had made his fortunes as a founding partner of the Alaska Commercial Company. William Kohl had built a different mansion and 16-acre estate with the same name, in what is now Central Park in San Mateo, however the first Kohl Mansion is no longer standing. Charles Frederick "Freddie" Kohl took over the family business after his father's death in 1893, which gave him access to fortunes. Charles Fredrick's first wife was Elizabeth Dunlop, they were married from 1896 until her death in 1900. His second wife was Mary Elisabeth "Bessie" (née Godey), they were married in 1904.

In 1909, a scandal destroyed the Kohl family. Adele Verge had been recently hired as a maid, and while the family was traveling she had a physical altercation with the chauffeur. Kohl had Verge arrested and had her psychiatrically evaluated. Verge sued Kohl for slander, false arrest and imprisonment. In 1911, there was a very public trial, which favored Kohl. Verge shot Kohl outside of the courthouse, and the bullet was lodged in his chest. Doctors were unable to remove the bullet and this injury cause Kohl both mental and physically impairment. Verge was deported back to her home country of France and committed to a mental institution, where she expressed wanting vengeance.

When the Kohl's moved into the Kohl Mansion in 1914, Charles Fredrick was dealing with depression, acting more paranoid, and jealous of his wife. By 1916, the Kohl family separated, the house was left with caretakers and Charles Fredrick moving to San Francisco into the Saint Francis Hotel and Bessie moving to Europe to work with Red Cross to entertain World War I troops. As a result, the house was unused for many years.

Charles Fredrick committed suicide in 1921 after acting paranoid upon hearing Verge had been released from the French mental asylum. He willed the mansion and $5.5 million to his mistress, Marion Louderback Lord. In 1921, Lord rented the mansion to United Artists for filming of Little Lord Fauntleroy the silent film. Lord sold the mansion to the Sisters of Mercy for $230,000, significantly less than its worth at the time.

=== Sisters of Mercy ===
In 1924, the Sisters of Mercy religious order bought the mansion to use as a convent. In 1925, the Ku Klux Klan, a group known for their anti-Catholicism stance, burned a cross on a hill above the convent. Many of the nuns reported unexplained activities like a white starchy powder appearing throughout the house. Lights and elevators powered on and off by themselves. They often heard the sounds of loud footsteps in the upper rooms and there was speculation of ghosts. In 1927, a blessing of the house was conducted by nuns and priests.

In 1931 they converted the mansion into Mercy High School. and in 1932, they built a new convent on the grounds.

== See also ==
- National Register of Historic Places listings in San Mateo County, California
