= Mercy High School (Burlingame, California) =

Private, all-female school in Burlingame, California, USA

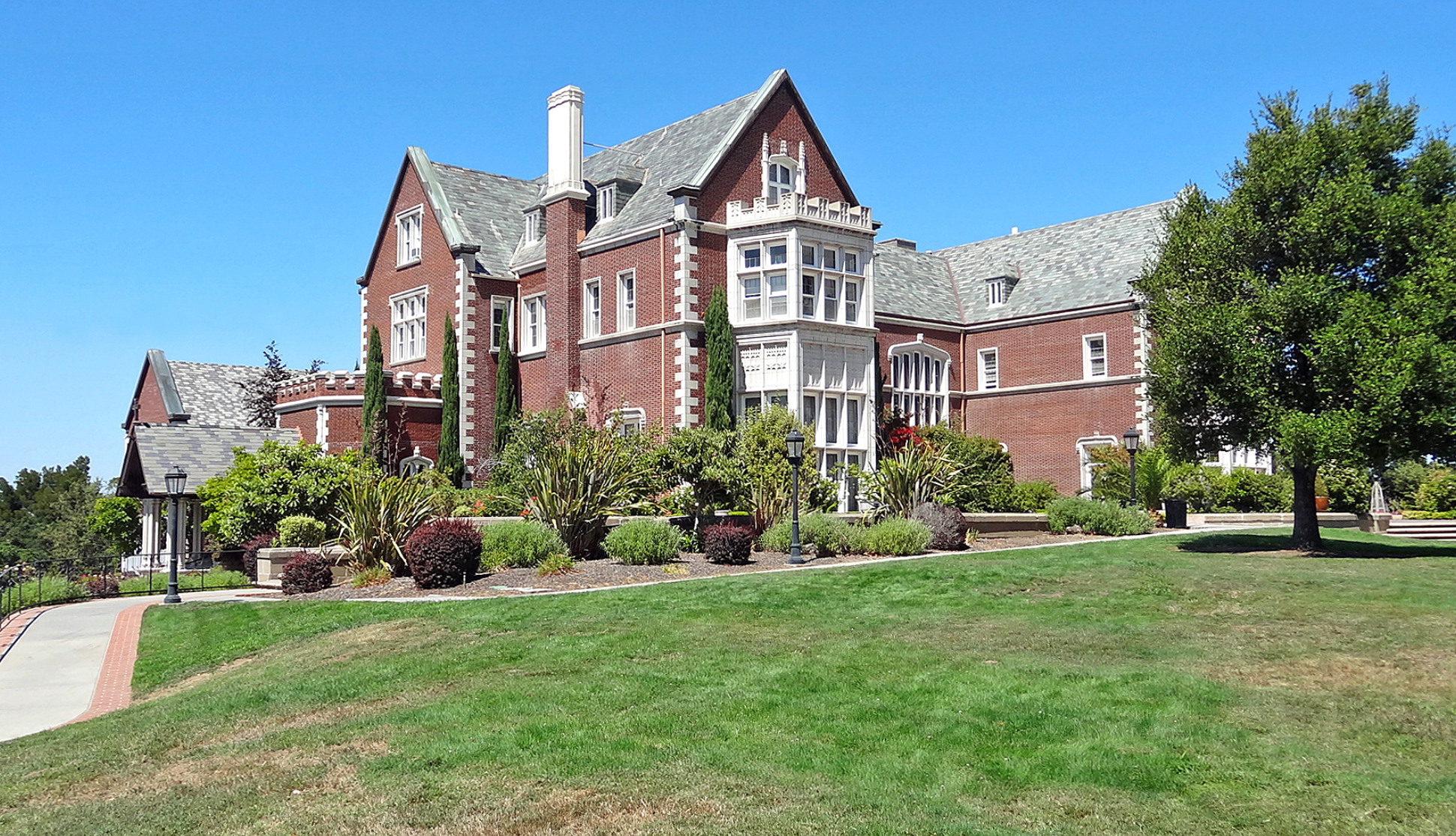

Location
- 2750 Adeline Drive; Burlingame, San Mateo County, California 94010; United States
- 37°34′57″N 122°22′59″W

Information
- Type: Private, all-female, Private
- Motto: Be known, be challenged, be transformed
- Religious affiliations: Roman Catholic; Sisters of Mercy; Roman Catholic Archdiocese of San Francisco
- Established: 1931
- Founder: Sisters of Mercy
- Status: Open
- Sister school: Notre Dame High School, Belmont, and Junipero Serra High School, San Mateo
- Head of school: Natalie Cirigliano Brosnan
- Faculty: 67
- Grades: 9-12
- Enrollment: 365 (2025)
- Average class size: 18
- Student to teacher ratio: 11:1
- Campus size: 40 acres
- Color: Blue White Gray Black
- Song: Alma Mater
- Athletics: Mercy Athletics
- Mascot: Bears
- Nickname: Mercy B
- Accreditation: Western Association of Schools and Colleges
- Publication: Mercy Oaks and Mercy OutLit (art/literary magazine)
- Tuition: $29,162.00 (2025-2026 school year)
- Affiliation: Sisters of Mercy, Roman Catholic Church, Archdiocese of San Francisco
- Website: www.mercyhsb.com

Mercy High School is a diocesan, private, all-girls Catholic high school in Burlingame, California, United States. The school is part of the Roman Catholic Archdiocese of San Francisco, and is run by the Sisters of Mercy, founded by Catherine McAuley. It is housed in Kohl Mansion.

== Campus ==
Mercy High School serves girls ages 14 to 18 years old in grades 9 to 12. The school was opened in 1931. The site of the school is also the Mercy Convent, a preschool, retirement center for religious sisters, as well as a conference room and retreat at the Mercy Center.

== Mascot ==
The prior mascots at the school were the Crusader Rabbit and the Crusaders. "Hip-Hop the Bunny" was the name of the Crusader Rabbit mascot suit used prior to the 2010s, when the mascot suit was abandoned. During the 2023–2024 school year, the school underwent a mascot change, and are now called the Mercy Bears.

== Kohl Mansion ==
The English Tudor revival mansion was built for Charles Frederick Kohl and his second wife Mary Elisabeth "Bessie" (née Godey), as their country house. It was completed in 1914, however two years later the house was unused after the couple separated. In 1924, the mansion was sold to the Sisters of Mercy for $230,000. The main building was exclusively a convent from 1924 to 1931, and it has been the home of Mercy High School since 1931.

== Use in film ==
The grounds of Mercy High School and Kohl Mansion has been filmed in for two movies. In 1921, Kohl Mansion was used by United Artists for the silent film Little Lord Fauntleroy. The estate was used again when Disney filmed the movie Flubber in 1996, starring Robin Williams.

== Athletics ==
Mercy offers 15 sports for students to choose from. Fall sports consist of cross country, golf, flag football, tennis, volleyball, and water polo. Winter sports consist of basketball and soccer. Spring sports consist of gymnastics, lacrosse, softball, swim & dive, and track & field. Year-round sports consist of cheer and dance.

== Tri-School ==
Mercy High School is a part of a program called Tri-School, a partnership with Notre Dame High School, Belmont, an all-girls high school, and Junipero Serra High School, San Mateo, an all-boys high school. The schools host some classes with mixed education and collaborate in other activities, including social gatherings put together by the teachers in the schools' foreign language departments, school dances, fall plays, and spring musicals.

== Notable alumni ==
- Jackie Speier, former California State Senator, Democratic Representative for California's 12th congressional district
- Suzanne Somers, actress
- Marilyn Lacey, founder and executive director of Mercy Beyond Borders, Sister of Mercy since 1966
- Toni Breidinger, American professional stock car racing driver
- Jenise Spiteri, Maltese American snowboarder
- Catriona Fallon, American rower
- Stephanie Sierra, KGO-TV reporter and anchor

== See also ==
- San Mateo County high schools
- Junipero Serra High School, San Mateo
- Notre Dame High School, Belmont
