= Mercy Beyond Borders =

- Abbreviation: MBB
- Formation: 2008
- Type: Non-profit; NGO
- Purpose: Partnering with displaced women and children in ways that alleviate their extreme poverty
- Headquarters: Santa Clara, California
- Region served: Southern Sudan
- Website: http://www.mercybeyondborders.org/

Mercy Beyond Borders is a U.S. nonprofit organization that partners with displaced women and children overseas in ways that alleviate their extreme poverty. Inspired by United Nations’ Millennium Development Goal #1 (cutting extreme poverty in half by 2015) and the experience of the Sisters of Mercy working globally with the poor since 1831, the organization is committed to working in refugee assistance and advocacy.

== History and mission ==
Mercy Beyond Borders was founded in 2008 by Sister Marilyn Lacey in response to the United Nations’ Millennium Development Goals. Headquartered in Santa Clara, California, Mercy Beyond Borders links U.S. resources with women displaced by violence, war, oppression, environmental degradation and by poverty itself. Mercy Beyond Borders carries out its mission via two strategies:

1. One Long term change: by promoting the education of women and girls.
2. Two Short term economic assistance: by funding grass-roots projects designed and implemented by displaced women.

Mercy Beyond Borders raises awareness as well as funds—always in support of women rebuilding their lives. Its funding comes from individuals across the U.S. who pledge to raise $1,000 per year; from schools and clubs and other donors sponsoring a particular project; and from corporations and foundations.

Its initial projects are in the Eastern Equatoria region of southern Sudan. Mercy Beyond Borders is contributing to the education of 800 elementary girls at St. Bakhita School (through teacher salaries, goats for nutrition, hygiene supplies). It is also partnering with the Sudanese Women’s Voice for Peace as it works for the economic development of refugee women returning to their home villages.

Sr. Lacey believes the program can most effectively focus on concrete, small projects. “We can connect Mercy resources in the U.S. with projects already established in the developing countries that need seed money. We can mobilize our Mercy passion to do this. We have 10 years to meet the U.N. Millennium Goals,” she told participants and members of the Sisters of Mercy at their annual convocation in 2007. (1)
