= Willborough, Burlingame Terrace, Burlingame, California =

Coordinates: 37.582405°N 122.353790°W

Burlingame's Historic Willborough neighborhood, located in Burlingame Terrace, is a block-long strip of early 20th century Tudor revival homes. Willborough Road and Willborough Place are located between Oak Grove Road and Palm Drive, a 10-minute walk southeast to downtown Burlingame Ave or 12-minute walk northwest to downtown Broadway Ave. Willborough Road and Willborough Place connect up with Neuchatel Avenue.

== History ==
The area where Willborough and Neuchatel reside was not a part of the first planned subdevelopments in Burlingame Terrace, rather it was a block of land listed as "De Coulon". In the 1920s, development of Willborough began by prolific SF Peninsula developer George W. Williams and contractor Frank F. Burrows. Frank F. Burrows went on to become mayor of Burlingame in 1944, president of the American General Contractors of America, and winner of the Building Industry Conference Board Achievement Award in 1974. The two combined their names to create the title "Willborough," spelled to match nearby Hillsborough. In the midst of the Great Depression, they wanted to supply starter homes for families with "Prices ... in keeping with the times... 5 rm. homes $5950 - $6150, 6 rm. homes $6,300 - $6500" The project's architect was an Englishman named Gilliam (no further details), who envisioned recreating a tight-knit European village with traditional Tudor-revival ("Tudorbethan") design. Twenty-two homes were built and all retain the original design, including:

- Half-Timber framing
- steeply pitched roofs
- high chimneys
- gabled dormer windows that work
- mullioned steel casement and diamond quarry windows

== Gallery ==
Homes in Willborough
