= Jobvite =

Cloud-based recruiting and human resources software platform

Jobvite, Inc.
- Formerly: ForumJobs, Inc.
- Type: Private
- Industry: Software
- Founded: 2006
- Founders: Jesper Schultz and Hans Larsen
- Headquarters: Indianapolis, United States
- Number of locations: London, Indianapolis, Portland, Canada, United Kingdom
- Key people: Peter Lamson, CEO; Jared Adams, COO; Joe Kuntz, CRO
- Services: Software, Recruiting, Human Resources
- Number of employees: 450
- Website: www.jobvite.com

Jobvite Inc. is a software and recruitment corporation based in Indianapolis, Indiana in the United States.

== History ==
Jobvite, Inc. was established in 2003 by Jesper Schultz and Hans Larsen, under the name ForumJobs, Inc. The company name was changed to Jobvite in 2006.

In July 2008, Dan Finnigan, formerly of Yahoo! and hotjobs.com, was appointed as the CEO of the company.

=== Investments and company expansion ===
In September 2010 Jobvite formed a partnership with SuccessFactors Business Execution (BizX) Suite. The partnership added over 8,000,000 users from BizX Suite to the Jobvite search platform.

In October 2014, Jobvite received US$25 million in investments from New York City-based growth equity firm Catalyst Investors. They joined Trident Capital, CMEA Capital, and ATA Ventures as one of the firm's chief investors. Investment in the company amounted to more than $55 million at the time.

In August 2015, the company launched operations in London, England. By 2019, the company had additional offices in Chicago, Boston, and Bengaluru, India.

In February 2019, K1 Investment Management invested more than $200 million in Jobvite. Part of the funds assisted in Jobvite's acquisition of three companies, Talemetry, RolePoint and Canvas. The acquisition resulted in an additional 2,000 customers for Jobvite, including Fortune 500 companies.

In April 2021, K1 Investment Management purchased and merged Jobvite with JazzHR and NXTThing RPO. Peter Lamson, the CEO of JazzHR, is the CEO for the combined companies.

== Services ==
In 2014, Jobvite was cited as being a server to over 1,600 global companies, with over 46 million job seekers worldwide. Jobvite specializes in the provision of a Software as a Service (SaaS) recruiting platform.

In 2010, its most popular application was "Work With Us", which had roughly 5,000 active users every month at the time.

Jobvite has become known for its surveys into social recruitment, and is frequently cited as a source by media outlets such as Time, Inc., and numerous authors of books on social and human resource management.
