= Burlingame, California =

City in California, United States

- City
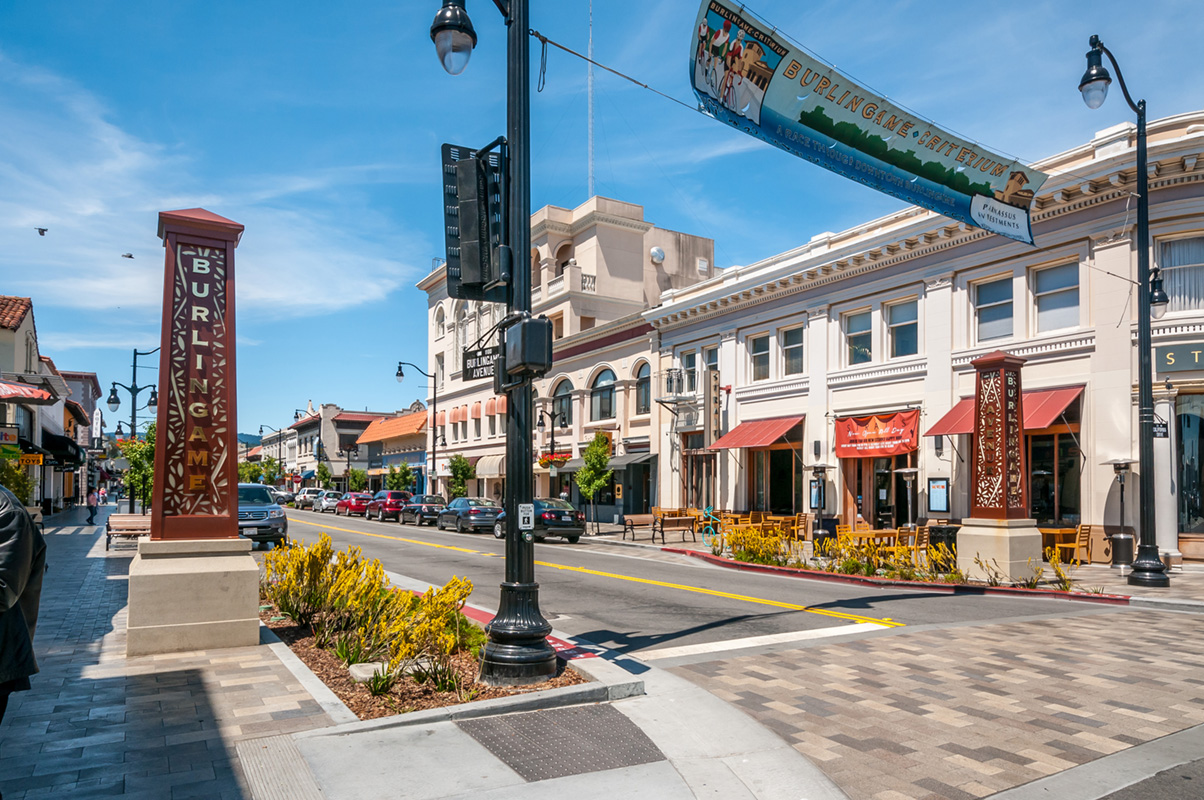
- Burlingame Avenue

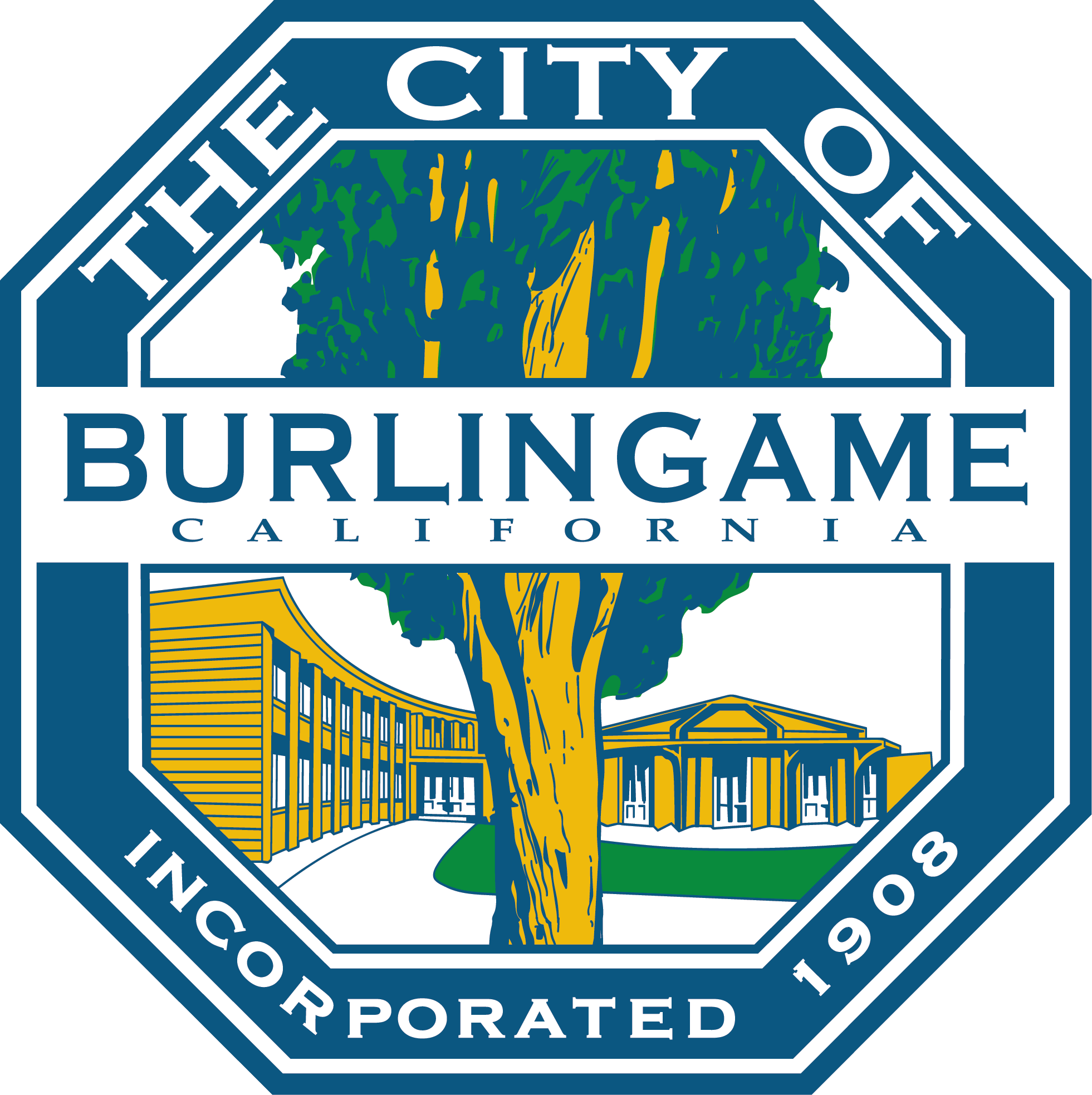
- Seal
- Interactive map of Burlingame, California
- Location in the United States
- Coordinates: 37°35′0″N 122°21′49″W
- Country: United States
- State: California
- County: San Mateo
- Incorporated: June 6, 1908
- Named for: Anson Burlingame

Government
  - Mayor: Peter Stevenson
  - City manager: Lisa Goldman

Area
  - Total: 6.04 sq mi (15.64 km^{2})
  - Land: 4.39 sq mi (11.38 km^{2})
  - Water: 1.64 sq mi (4.26 km^{2}) 27.25%
- Elevation: 39 ft (12 m)

Population (2020)
  - Total: 31,386
  - Density: 7,144.3/sq mi (2,758.42/km^{2})
- Time zone: UTC-8 (Pacific)
  - Summer (DST): UTC-7 (PDT)
- ZIP Codes: 94010–94012
- Area code: 650
- FIPS code: 06-09066
- GNIS feature IDs: 1659704, 2409945
- Website: www.burlingame.org

Burlingame (/ˈbɜːr.lɪŋ.ɡeɪm/) is a city in San Mateo County, California, United States. It is located on the San Francisco Peninsula and has a significant shoreline on San Francisco Bay. The city is named after diplomat Anson Burlingame. As of the 2020 census, the city population was 31,386.

== History ==
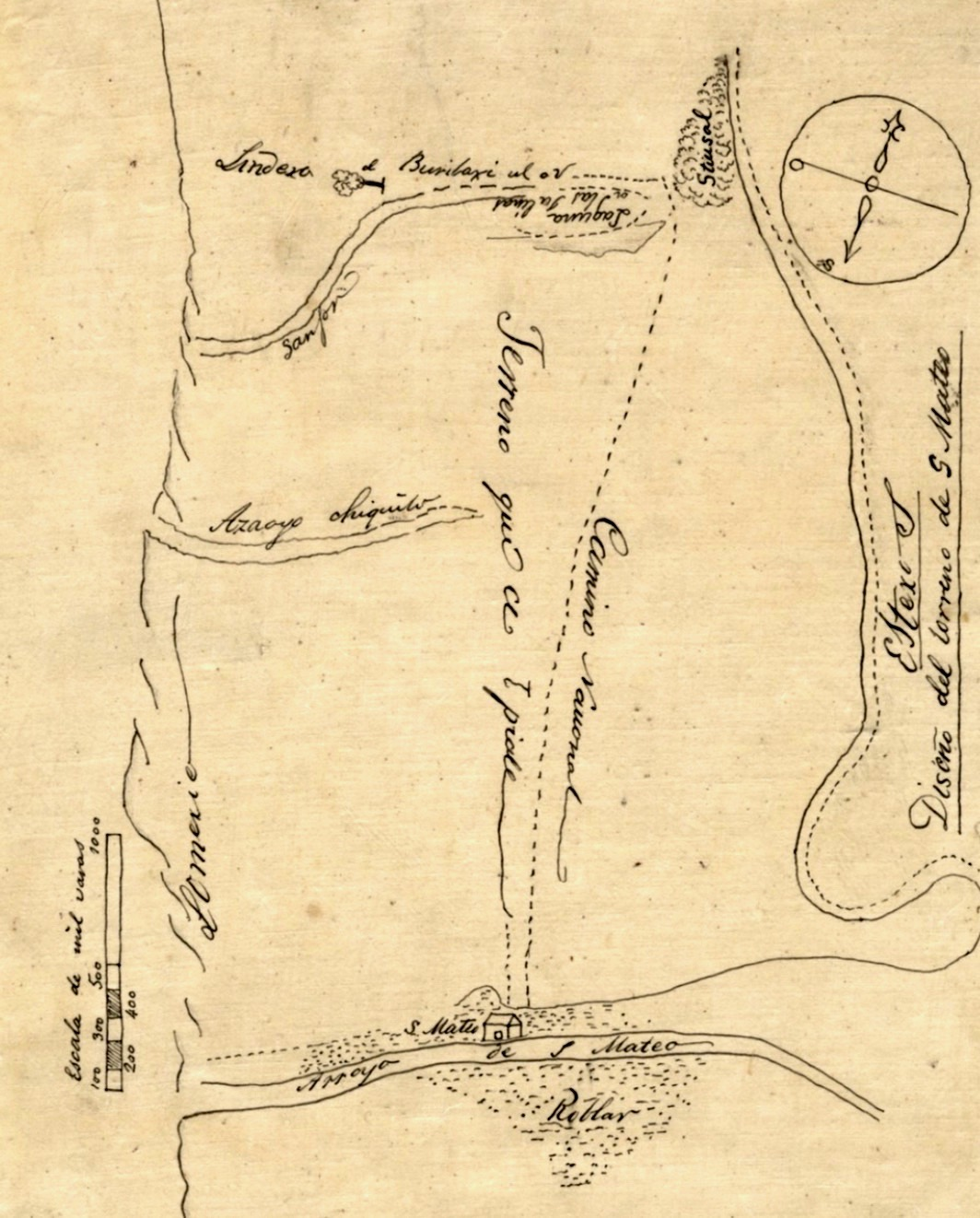
Burlingame was originally part of Rancho San Mateo, granted to Californio ranchero Cayetano Arenas in 1846.

- Howard–Ralston Eucalyptus Tree Rows
- U.S. National Register of Historic Places
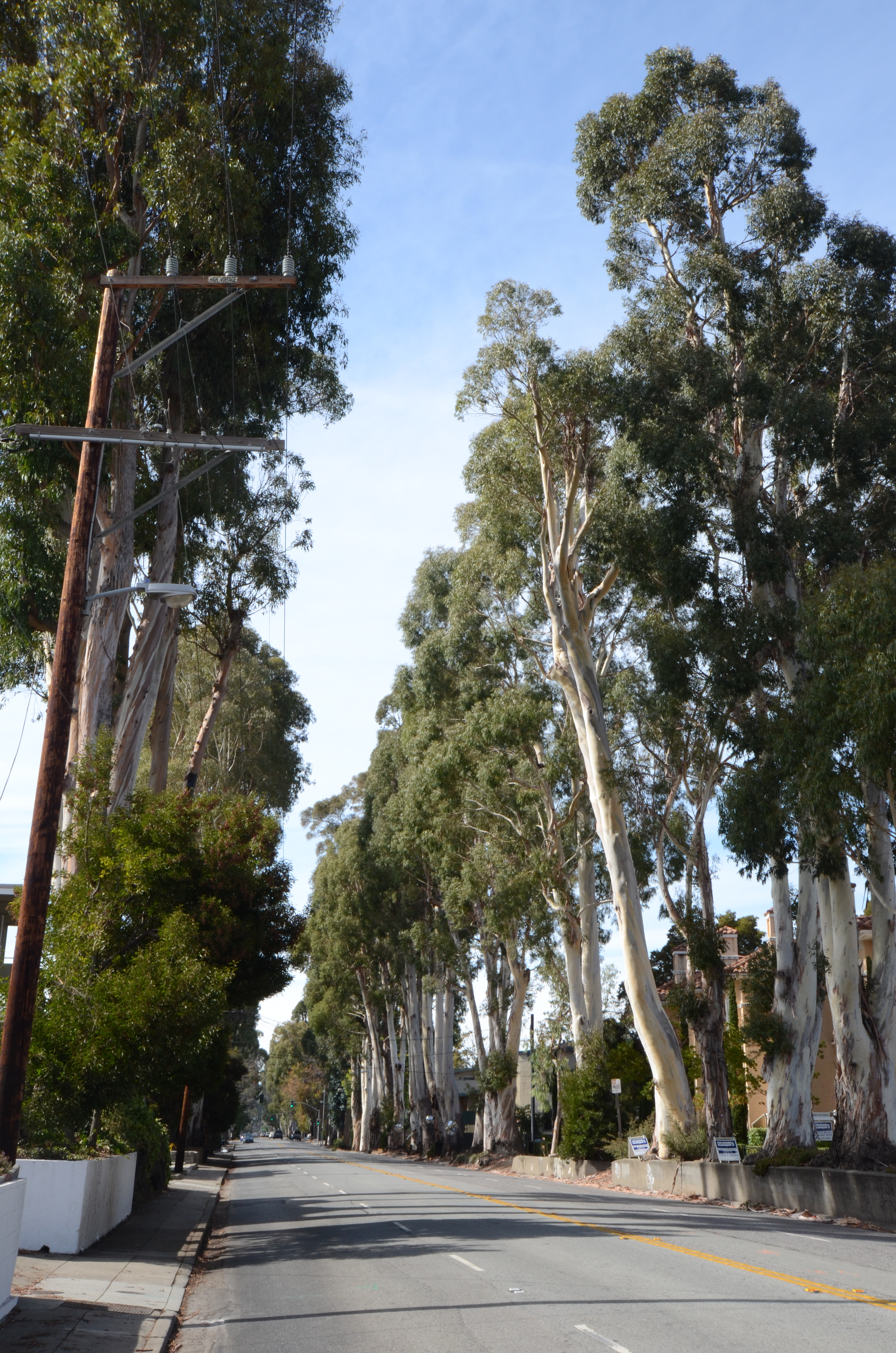
- Location: El Camino Real, Burlingame, CA
- Built: 1873–1876
- NRHP reference No.: 12000127
- Added to NRHP: March 15, 2012

Burlingame is situated on land previously owned by San Francisco-based merchant William Davis Merry Howard. Howard planted many eucalyptus trees on his property and retired to live on the land. Howard died in 1856 and the land was sold to William C. Ralston, a prominent banker. In 1868, Ralston named the land after his friend Anson Burlingame, the United States Ambassador to China. After the 1906 San Francisco earthquake, hundreds of lots in Burlingame were sold to people looking to establish new homes, and the town of Burlingame was incorporated in 1908. In 1910, the neighboring town of Easton was annexed and this area is now known as the Easton Addition neighborhood of Burlingame.

Burlingame refers to itself as the City of Trees due to its over 18,000 public trees within the city. In 1908, the Burlingame board of trustees passed an ordinance "prohibiting cutting, injuring, or destroying trees". The city also has many parks and eucalyptus groves.

In 2018, upon the 150th anniversary of the 1868 landmark Burlingame Treaty between the U.S. and China, a new bust of diplomat Anson Burlingame, sculpted by Zhou Limin from China, was unveiled at an international ceremony at the Burlingame Public Library.

== Geography ==
According to the United States Census Bureau, the city has a total area of 6.1 square miles (16 km^{2}). 4.4 square miles (11 km^{2}) of it is land, and 1.7 square miles (4.4 km^{2}) of it (comprising 27.25%) is water.

Several creeks drain across Burlingame from the peninsula foothills to the San Francisco Bay.

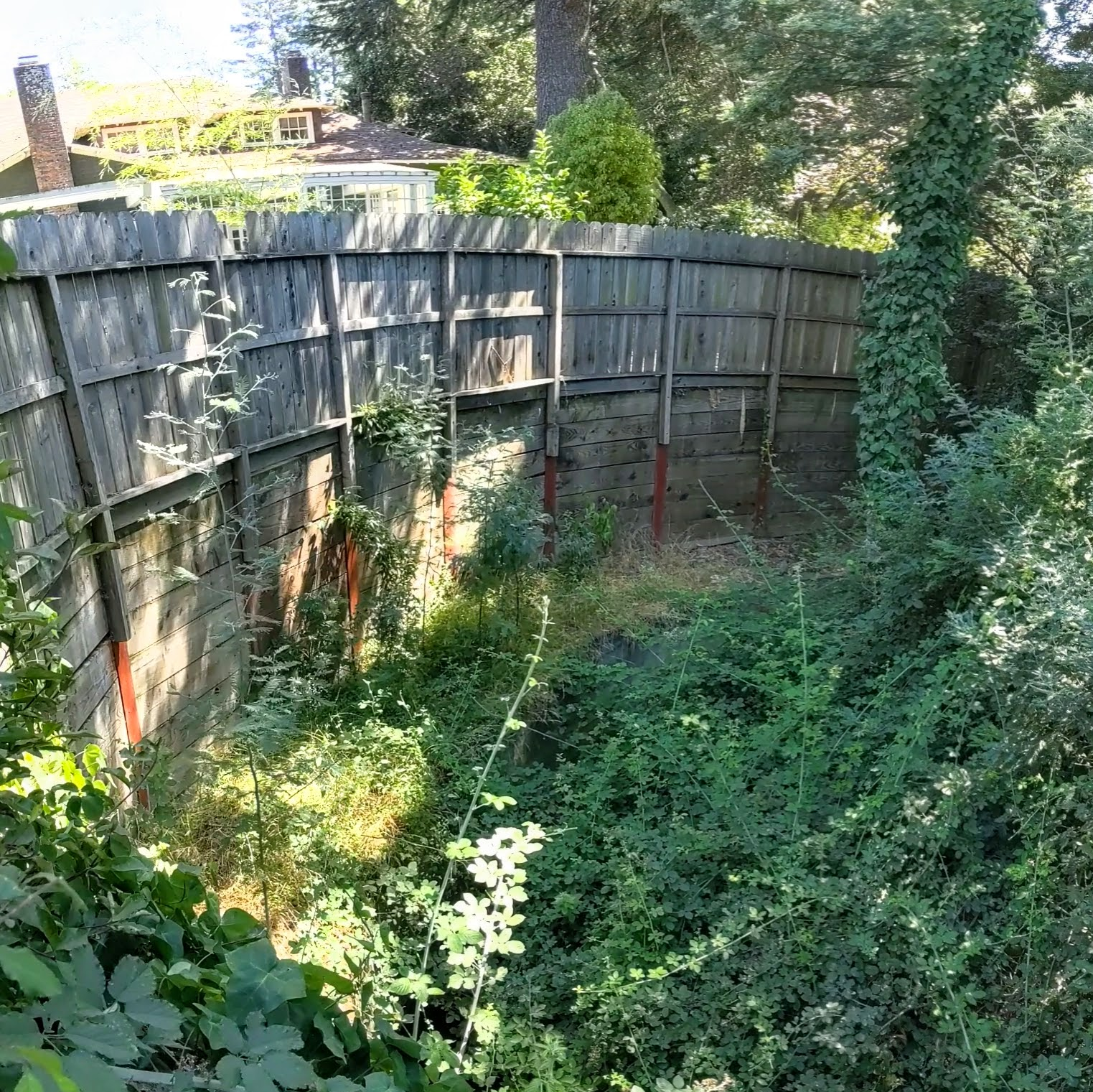
Ralston Creek

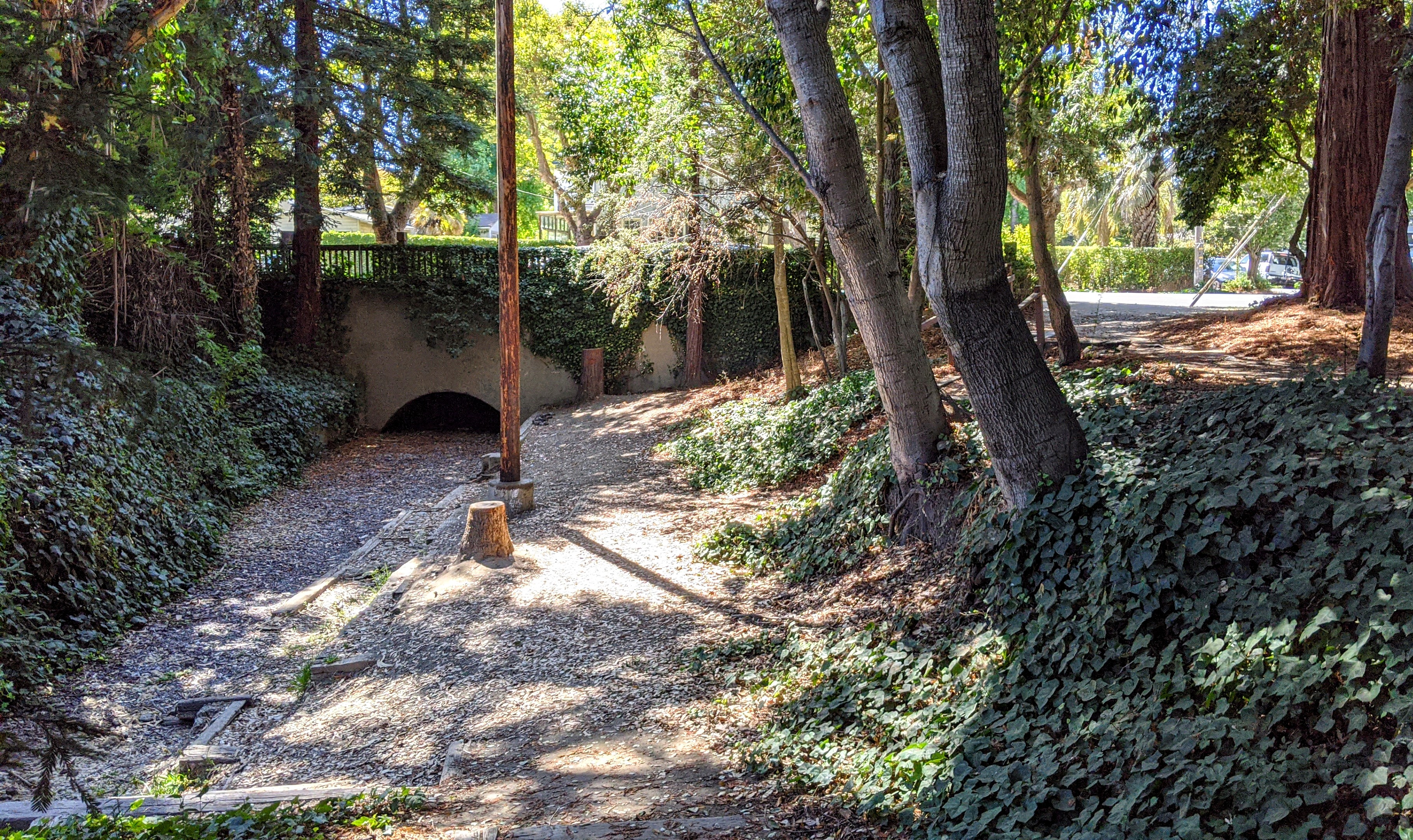
Burlingame Creek

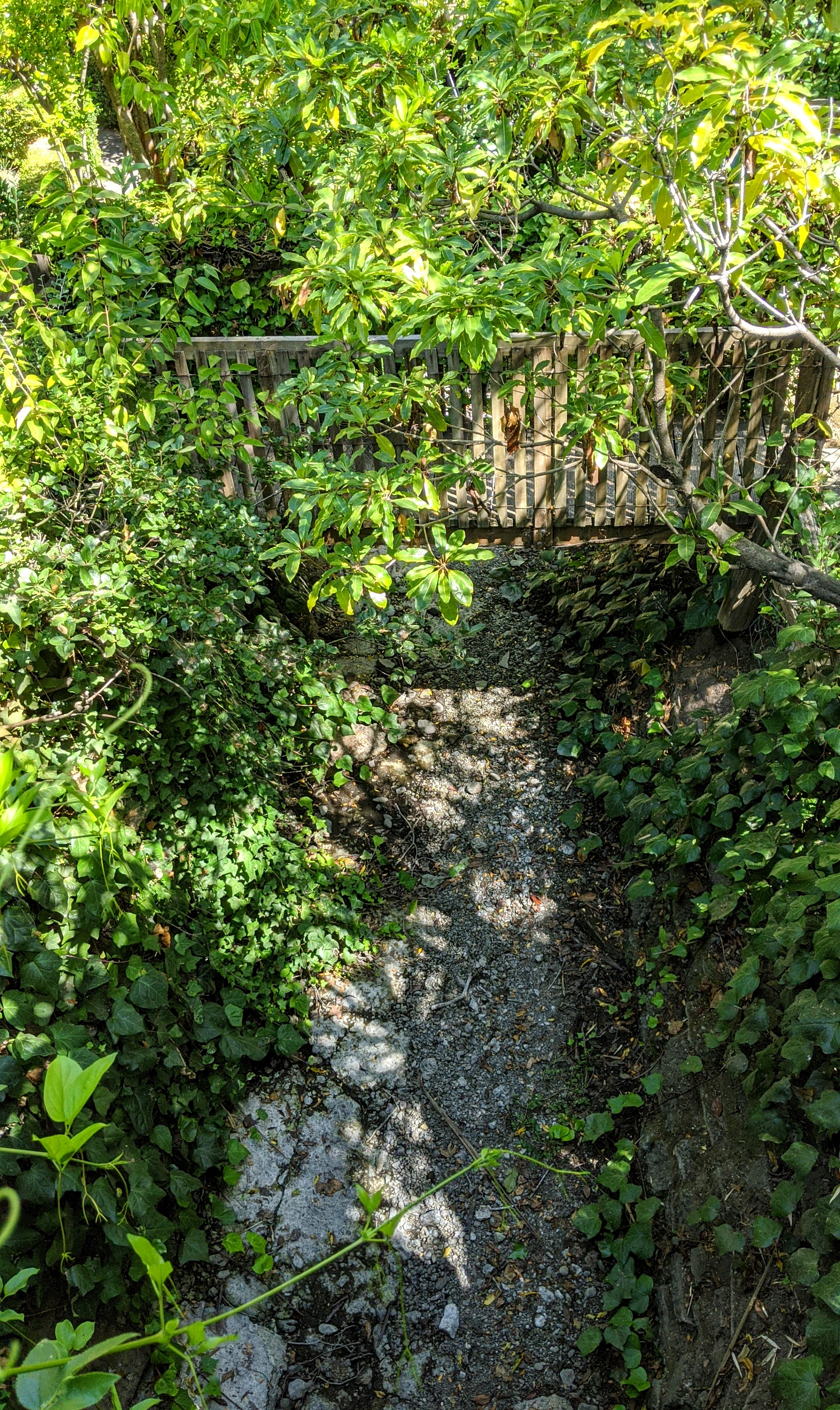
Sanchez Creek

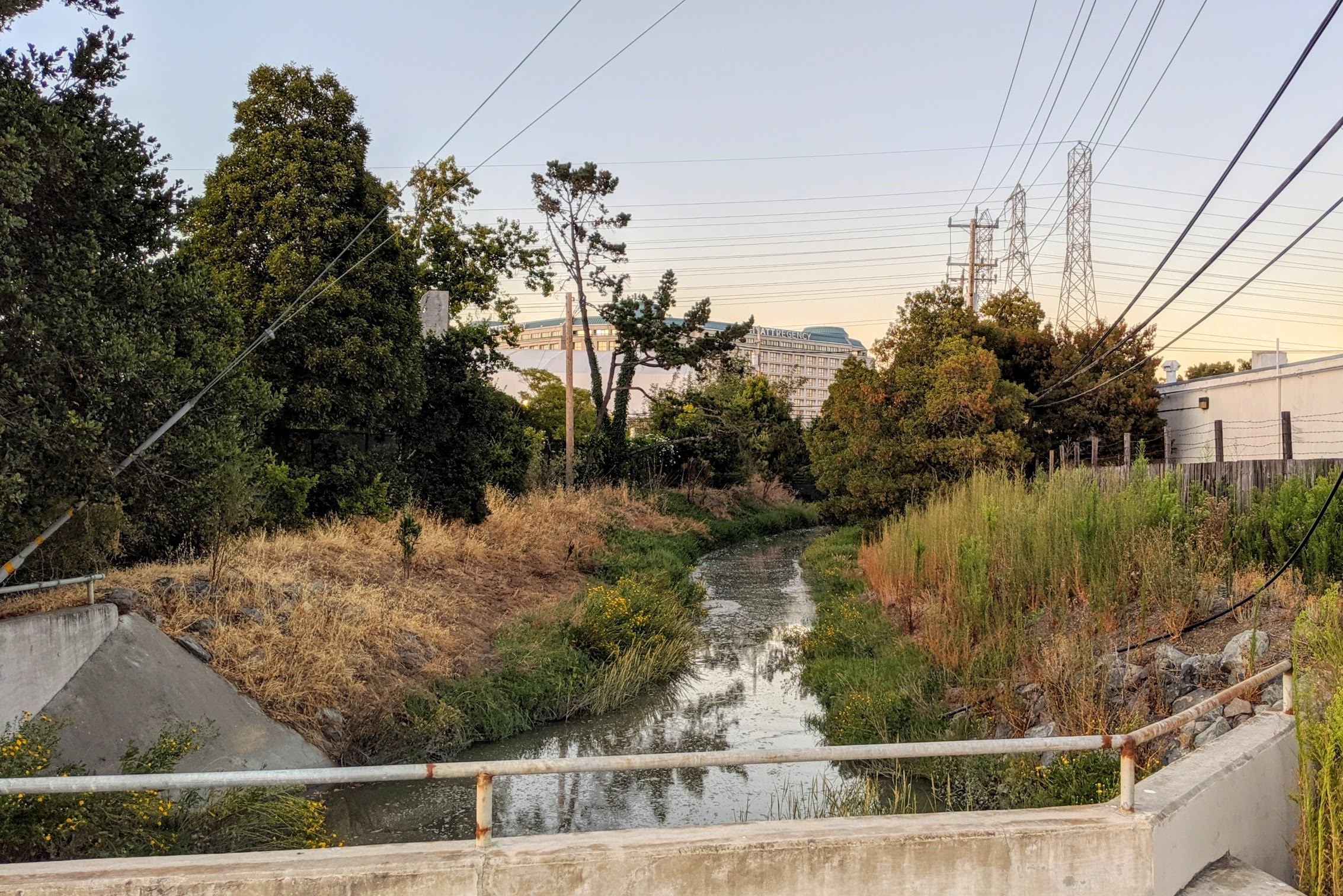
Easton Creek

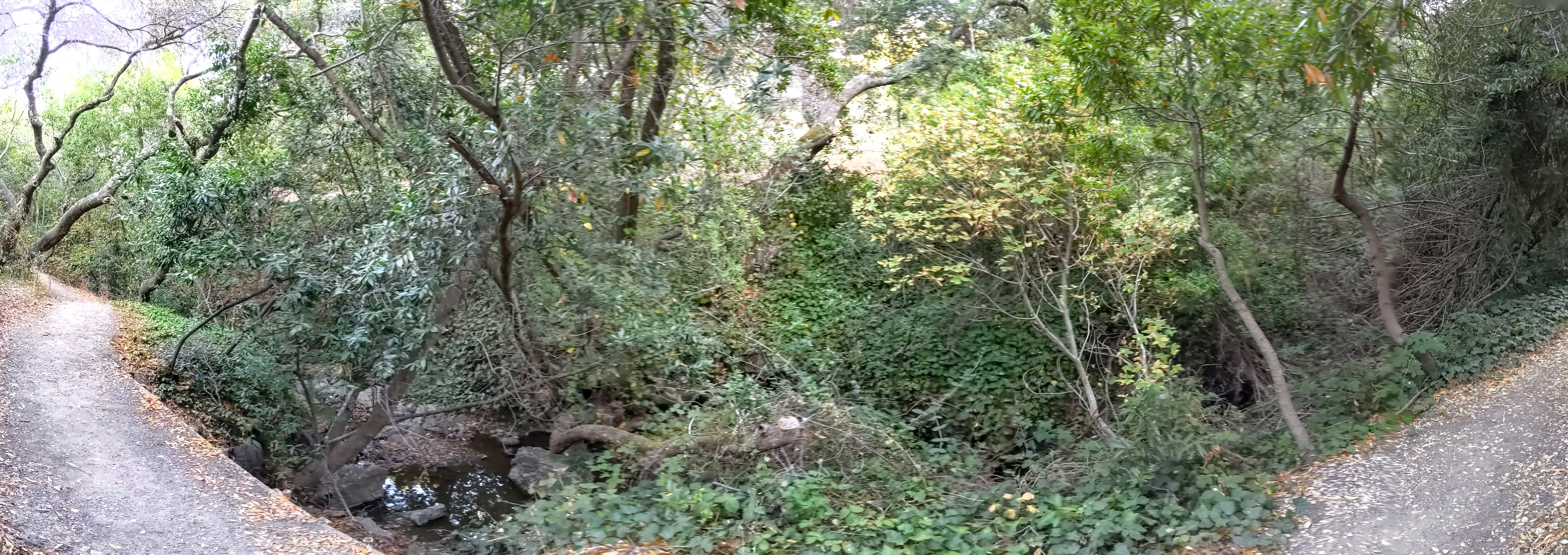
Mills Creek

=== Climate ===
Burlingame experiences warm and dry summers, with no average monthly temperatures above 71.6 °F (22 °C). According to the Köppen Climate Classification system, Burlingame has a warm-summer Mediterranean climate.

Climate data for Burlingame, California
Month	Jan	Feb	Mar	Apr	May	Jun	Jul	Aug	Sep	Oct	Nov	Dec	Year
Record high °F (°C)	74 (23)	78 (26)	84 (29)	88 (31)	97 (36)	104 (40)	103 (39)	98 (37)	102 (39)	91 (33)	87 (31)	73 (23)	104 (40)
Mean daily maximum °F (°C)	56.5 (13.6)	60.3 (15.7)	62.2 (16.8)	65.5 (18.6)	68.9 (20.5)	72.4 (22.4)	74.1 (23.4)	74.3 (23.5)	75.2 (24.0)	71.0 (21.7)	63.7 (17.6)	57.1 (13.9)	66.8 (19.3)
Daily mean °F (°C)	48.4 (9.1)	51.6 (10.9)	53.0 (11.7)	55.5 (13.1)	58.5 (14.7)	61.8 (16.6)	63.4 (17.4)	63.4 (17.4)	63.8 (17.7)	60.1 (15.6)	54.4 (12.4)	49.4 (9.7)	56.9 (13.8)
Mean daily minimum °F (°C)	40.3 (4.6)	43.0 (6.1)	43.9 (6.6)	45.5 (7.5)	48.1 (8.9)	51.2 (10.7)	52.7 (11.5)	52.5 (11.4)	52.3 (11.3)	49.2 (9.6)	45.2 (7.3)	41.5 (5.3)	47.1 (8.4)
Record low °F (°C)	22 (−6)	27 (−3)	29 (−2)	32 (0)	34 (1)	40 (4)	41 (5)	42 (6)	36 (2)	32 (0)	30 (−1)	25 (−4)	22 (−6)
Average precipitation inches (mm)	4.8 (120)	3.1 (79)	2.6 (66)	1.3 (33)	0.4 (10)	0.1 (2.5)	0.0 (0.0)	0.1 (2.5)	0.2 (5.1)	1.1 (28)	2.4 (61)	3.8 (97)	20.2 (510)
Average precipitation days	10	9	8	5	3	1	0	1	1	4	7	9	58

== Demographics ==
Historical population
Census	Pop.	Note	%±
1910	1,565		—
1920	4,107		162.4%
1930	13,270		223.1%
1940	15,940		20.1%
1950	19,886		24.8%
1960	24,036		20.9%
1970	27,320		13.7%
1980	26,173		−4.2%
1990	26,801		2.4%
2000	28,158		5.1%
2010	28,806		2.3%
2020	31,386		9.0%
U.S. Decennial Census; 1860–1870 1880-1890; 1900 1910 1920; 1930 1940 1950; 1960 1970 1980; 1990 2000 2010; 2020

=== Racial and ethnic composition ===
Burlingame city, California – Racial and ethnic composition Note: the US Census treats Hispanic/Latino as an ethnic category. This table excludes Latinos from the racial categories and assigns them to a separate category. Hispanics/Latinos may be of any race.
Race / Ethnicity (NH = Non-Hispanic)	Pop 2000	Pop 2010	Pop 2020	% 2000	% 2010	% 2020
White alone (NH)	20,063	17,434	15,826	71.25%	60.52%	50.42%
Black or African American alone (NH)	266	327	284	0.94%	1.14%	0.90%
Native American or Alaska Native alone (NH)	39	34	20	0.14%	0.12%	0.06%
Asian alone (NH)	3,841	5,773	8,574	13.64%	20.04%	27.32%
Native Hawaiian or Pacific Islander alone (NH)	132	129	105	0.47%	0.45%	0.33%
Other race alone (NH)	68	156	338	0.24%	0.54%	1.08%
Mixed race or Multiracial (NH)	754	987	1,976	2.68%	3.43%	6.30%
Hispanic or Latino (any race)	2,995	3,966	4,263	10.64%	13.77%	13.58%
Total	28,158	28,806	31,386	100.00%	100.00%	100.00%

=== 2020 census ===
As of the 2020 census, Burlingame had a population of 31,386 and a population density of 7,144.5 inhabitants per square mile (2,758.5/km^{2}). The age distribution was 22.6% under the age of 18, 5.4% from 18 to 24, 29.4% from 25 to 44, 26.5% from 45 to 64, and 16.2% who were 65 years of age or older; the median age was 40.5 years. For every 100 females there were 93.3 males, and for every 100 females age 18 and over there were 90.5 males age 18 and over.

100.0% of residents lived in urban areas, while 0.0% lived in rural areas.

There were 12,481 households, of which 33.0% had children under the age of 18 living in them; 51.5% were married-couple households, 6.6% were cohabiting couple households, 25.5% had a female householder with no partner present, and 16.4% had a male householder with no partner present. About 28.2% of all households were made up of individuals and 9.8% had someone living alone who was 65 years of age or older. The average household size was 2.47. There were 7,958 families, representing 63.8% of all households.

There were 13,170 housing units at an average density of 2,998.0 units per square mile (1,157.5 units/km^{2}), of which 12,481 (94.8%) were occupied; 46.1% were owner-occupied and 53.9% were occupied by renters. The homeowner vacancy rate was 0.7% and the rental vacancy rate was 4.0%.

The census reported that 98.2% of the population lived in households, 0.9% lived in non-institutionalized group quarters, and 0.9% were institutionalized.

Racial composition as of the 2020 census
Race	Number	Percent
White	16,647	53.0%
Black or African American	298	0.9%
American Indian and Alaska Native	120	0.4%
Asian	8,649	27.6%
Native Hawaiian and Other Pacific Islander	113	0.4%
Some other race	1,901	6.1%
Two or more races	3,658	11.7%

=== Income ===
According to the U.S. Census Bureau, American Community Survey (ACS), median household income was $168,832 and per capita income was $97,803, in 2023 dollars.

== Neighborhoods ==
- Burlingame Estates
- Burlingame Gardens
- Burlingame Gate
- Burlingame Hills
- Burlingame Park
- Burlingame Terrace
- Burlingame Village
- Country Club Manor
- Downtown
- Easton Addition
- Lyon Hoag
- Oak Grove Manor
- Ray Park

== Government ==
In the California State Legislature, Burlingame is in the 13th senatorial district, represented by Democrat Josh Becker, and in the 21st Assembly district, represented by Democrat Diane Papan.

In the United States House of Representatives, Burlingame is in California's 15th congressional district, represented by Democrat Kevin Mullin.

According to the California Secretary of State, as of February 10, 2019, Burlingame has 17,750 registered voters. Of those, 8,439 (47.5%) are registered Democrats, 3,048 (17.2%) are registered Republicans, and 5,551 (31.3%) have declined to state a political party.

== Economy ==
In the 1920s, Burlingame became a popular location for automobile retailers which became known as "Auto Row".

In the 1960s, various aerospace and airline support service businesses opened in Burlingame due to its proximity to San Francisco International Airport. As of 2018, LSG/Sky Chefs, Inc. and China Airlines are all located in Burlingame. The airport location has also attracted the headquarters of medium-sized multi-site companies such as Meri Meri and Proterra, Inc.

Historically, Burlingame has been home to many candy and chocolate companies, including the It's-It ice cream factory and store, Guittard Chocolate, the See's Candies lollipop factory, and family-owned candy stores, including Powell's, Preston's, Aida Opera Candies, and Nuts for Candy.

Since 2010, Burlingame's economy has diversified substantially and it has become an attractive location for biotechnology companies given its proximity to South San Francisco. Biotechnology companies with offices in Burlingame include Annai Systems, Breathometer, Cala Health, Cleave Biosciences, Collaborative Drug Discovery, Confidence Clinical Research, Corvus Pharmaceuticals, Igenica Biotherapeutics, Kindred Biosciences, Omnitura, Phoenix Pharmaceuticals, Pulse Biosciences, Respira Therapeutics, and Vector Labs.

Additionally, multiple high-technology firms have established offices in Burlingame due to its location between the booming technology centers of Silicon Valley to the south and San Francisco to the north. Tech companies with Burlingame offices include: Meta, Zecco.com, Natsume, Color Genomics, CarWoo, Jobvite, DataStax, Sprint's M2M Collaboration Center, YouWeb, OpenFeint, CrowdStar, BitGravity, Veebeam, TellApart and xAI.

As of March 2022, the median single home value in Burlingame was $2.8 million.

== Education ==
=== Primary and secondary schools ===
Public schools

San Mateo Union High School District operates local high schools while the Burlingame School District operates elementary and middle schools.

Burlingame High School is the city's sole public high school. Burlingame Intermediate School is Burlingame's sole public middle school. There are six public elementary schools serving Burlingame. They are Franklin Elementary, Lincoln Elementary, McKinley Elementary, Roosevelt Elementary, Washington Elementary, and Hoover Elementary. According to the 2009 Base Academic Performance Index (API) Scores from the California Department of Education, the Burlingame School District ranks among the best in the state, with 4 out of their 6 public elementary schools (Roosevelt Elementary, Washington Elementary, Franklin Elementary, and Lincoln Elementary) scoring well between 880 and 925, and with ratings of 9 or 10. Burlingame school district enrollment has continually been increasing as young families move to the city. The city has passed two bond measures to add new facilities and modernize existing facilities to provide state-of-the-art classrooms. The city recently extensively renovated and modernized the Hoover School, which was built in 1931 and reopened in 2016.

Private schools

Mercy High School is a private Catholic all-girls high school in Burlingame. It was founded in 1931 by the Sisters of Mercy. The school is located in the Kohl Mansion which is a Historic Landmark. Our Lady of Angels School and St. Catherine of Siena School are located in Burlingame.

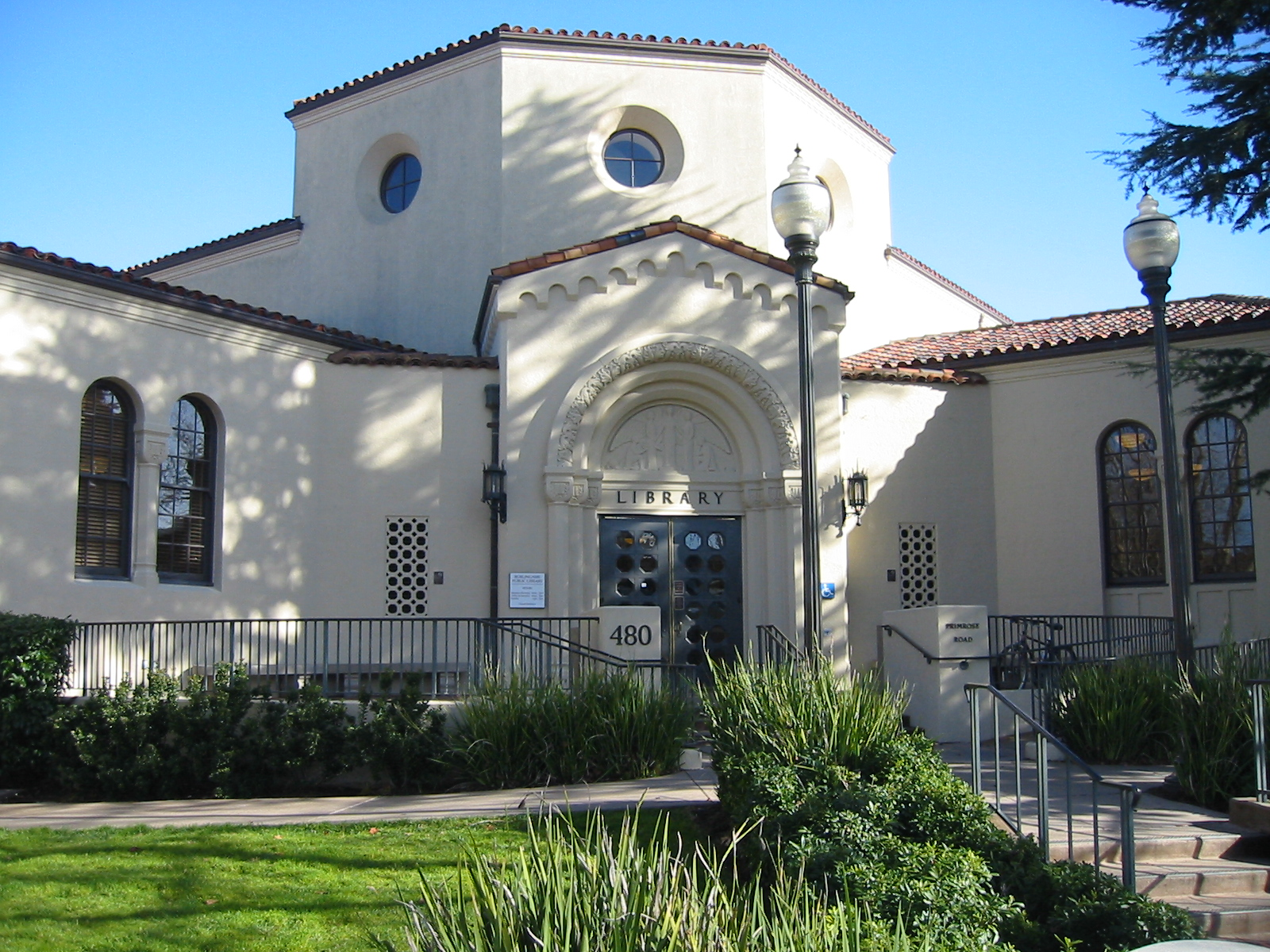
Burlingame Library

=== Public libraries ===
Burlingame Library is located in Burlingame. It was established by city ordinance October 11, 1909. Following the Loma Prieta earthquake in 1989, the City approved a bond issue to reconstruct the library. The architecture has won awards and earned a cover story in the 1998 American Libraries journal. A second branch, located on Easton Drive, is substantially smaller than the main branch. Both are operated by the Peninsula Library System, the library authority for the county.

== Points of interest ==
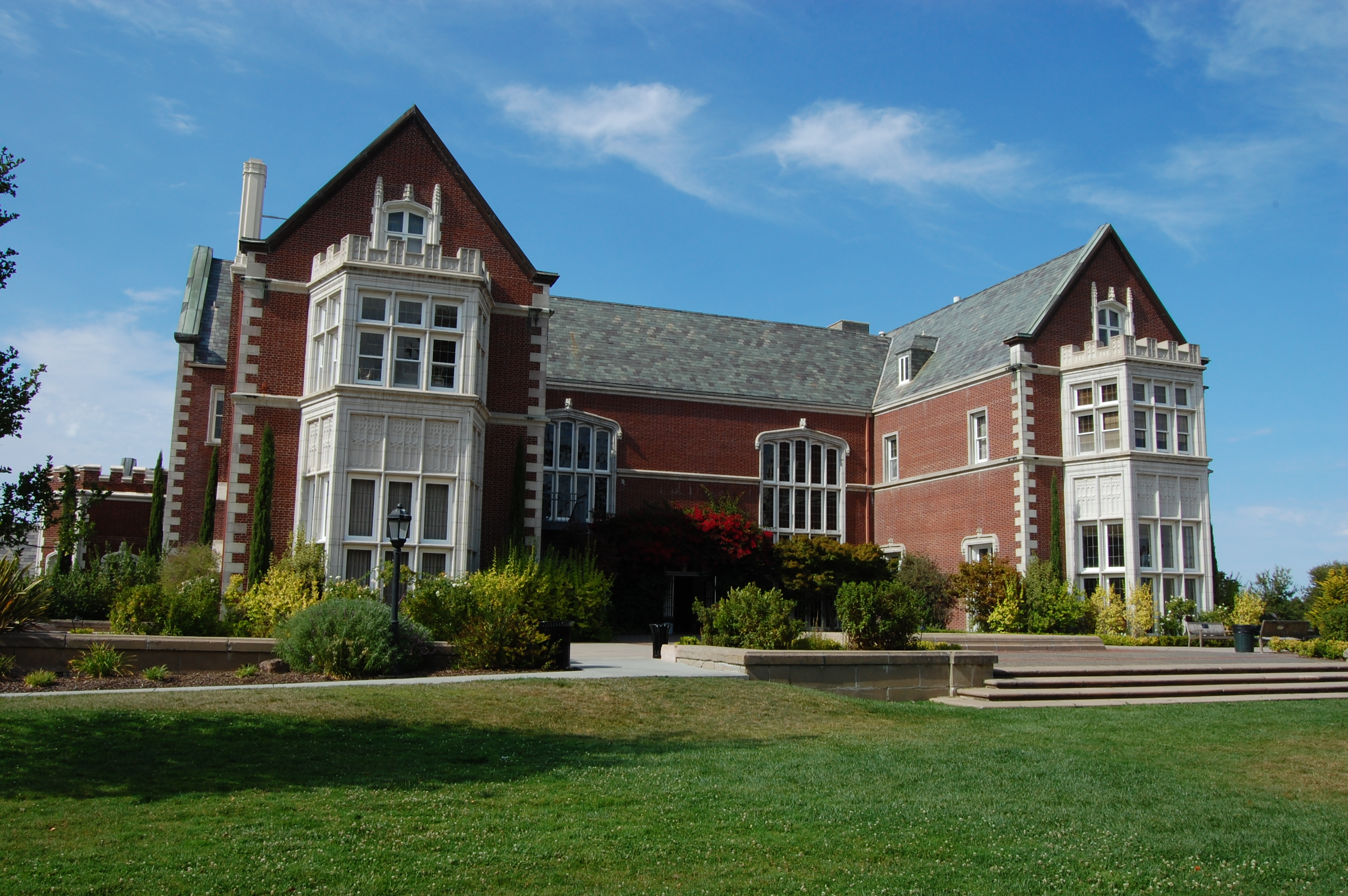
The Kohl Mansion, now the home of Mercy High School

- Burlingame Avenue and Broadway, two streets running parallel to each other about one mile apart, are two of the city's main retail districts and downtown areas. Downtown Burlingame Avenue also houses the Apple Store.
- Burlingame Station, a Caltrain station in Burlingame, is listed on the National Register of Historic Places.
- Kohl Mansion is a 63-room brick Tudor-style mansion on 40 acres (16 ha) of land. It was originally built by Bessie and Frederick Kohl, with architects Howard and White, and completed in 1914. The estate included tennis courts, greenhouses, a rose garden, a large carriage house, and a 150,000 gallon reservoir. In 1921, the silent version of the film Little Lord Fauntleroy, with Mary Pickford, was filmed in the Kohl Mansion. The mansion, sold to the Sisters of Mercy in 1924, was a convent from 1924 to 1931, and it has been the home of Mercy High School since 1931.
- The Burlingame Museum of Pez Memorabilia was located off of Burlingame avenue and claimed to have every Pez dispenser ever sold. It was founded in 1995 by Gary and Nancy Doss who had been collecting Pez dispensers for more than a decade. The museum was featured in Time, on the Discovery Channel, and Travel Channel. It closed in July 2019.

== Transportation ==
=== Highways ===
Three highways pass through Burlingame. Highway 101 runs from San Jose to San Francisco along San Francisco Bay. Highway 82, also known as El Camino Real, runs parallel to Highway 101 and acts as the main corridor for local traffic going up and down the peninsula. A small section of Highway 35 (Skyline Boulevard) also lies with city limits. It connects with Interstate 280, which runs along the side of Burlingame opposite Highway 101.

=== Public transport ===
Caltrain has served Burlingame station since 1985 when it bought out Southern Pacific. It uses the same depot that was used in the early 20th century.

Bay Area Rapid Transit has its southern terminus for the Red and Yellow lines in Millbrae, just north of Burlingame. BART's tracks are within Burlingame city limits.

In terms of buses, Burlingame is served by SamTrans bus lines 292, 398, 46 and the ECR as well as Commute.org and Caltrain shuttles. The City of Burlingame and local businesses sponsor the Burlingame Trolley, a two-route shuttle.

=== Air transport ===
Burlingame is among the closest cities to San Francisco International Airport, and through BART and buses, is directly accessible to the airport's AirTrain system. Through BART, Burlingame is also connected to Oakland International Airport, and by using a combination of CalTrain services and VTA buses or light rail, Burlingame is connected to San Jose International Airport.

== Notable people ==
=== Actors ===
- Dianna Agron, actress from Glee, attended Burlingame Intermediate School and Burlingame High School
- Sally Dryer, actress known for voicing Lucy Van Pelt in Peanuts holiday specials
- Hannah Hart, comedian and YouTuber, was raised in Burlingame
- Adam Klein, winner of Survivor: Millennials vs Gen X, attended Burlingame High School
- Brad Schreiber, author and TV writer-producer, attended Burlingame High School and lived in the mayor's mansion at 238 Myrtle Road

=== Artists and designers ===
- Chen Chi-kwan, (1921–2007) Taiwanese-born artist, architect, and educator, lived and died in Burlingame.
- Leon Gilmour, (1907–1996) wood engraving artist, died in Burlingame
- Percy Gray, artist and painter, lived in Burlingame from 1912 to 1923
- Fred Lyon (1924–2022) American photographer, raised in Burlingame.

=== Businesspeople and entrepreneurs ===
- Marc Benioff, founder and CEO of Salesforce.com, attended Burlingame High School
- Charles S. Howard, owner of Seabiscuit, owned a home in Burlingame
- Leonard Read, founder of the Foundation for Economic Education, lived in Burlingame

=== Writers ===
- Bill Amend, author of the comic strip FoxTrot, attended Burlingame High School
- Shirley Jackson, author, whose novel The Road Through the Wall is set in Burlingame
- Tamora Pierce, best-selling children's author, attended Burlingame Intermediate School

=== Sports ===
- David Bakhtiari, starting offensive tackle for the Green Bay Packers, lives in Burlingame
- Scott Feldman, Major League Baseball pitcher for the Cincinnati Reds
- George Kelly, Hall of Fame baseball player nicknamed "High Pockets", lived and died in Burlingame
- Hank Sauer, two-time All-Star outfielder for Chicago Cubs, died in Burlingame
- Regan Smith, Olympic swimming gold medalist, born in Burlingame

=== Others ===
- Jung-Ho Pak, orchestra conductor, was born in Burlingame
- Tom Lantos, Democratic Congressman who resided in Burlingame during his time in office.
- Katrina Swett, President of the Lantos Foundation. Former chair of the U.S. Commission on International Religious Freedom. 2002 and 2010 candidate for New Hampshire's 2nd congressional district. Daughter of Congressman Tom Lantos and wife of Congressman Richard Swett.

== In popular culture ==
- In The Maltese Falcon, Sam Spade rushes to 26 Ancho Street in Burlingame to rescue Brigid O'Shaughnessy.
- Scenes from the film Dangerous Minds were filmed on the campus of Burlingame High School in the spring of 1994.
- Burlingame is home to the historic Kohl Mansion, where the movie Flubber was filmed.
- In James Patterson's Women's Murder Club series, San Francisco Assistant District Attorney Jill Bernhardt lives in Burlingame.
- Leo Wyatt, a character from the series Charmed, was born in Burlingame.
- Burlingame is the setting for the novel "The Extraordinary Life of Sam Hell" by author Robert Dugoni
