= Jim Dermody =

Irish hurler

Personal information
- Native name: Séamus Ó Diarmada (Irish)
- Born: 1 September 1898 Three Castles, County Kilkenny, Ireland
- Died: 9 February 1975 (aged 76) Liverpool, England

Sport
- Sport: Hurling
- Position: Goalkeeper
Clubs
- Years: Club
- Threecastles; Tullaroan
Club titles
- Kilkenny titles: 1
Inter-county
- Years: County
- 1922-1934: Kilkenny
Inter-county titles
- Leinster titles: 4
- All-Irelands: 2
- NHL: 1

James Dermody (1 September 1898 – 9 February 1975) was an Irish hurler. His league and championship career as a goalkeeper with the Kilkenny senior team lasted several years between 1922 and 1934.

Born in Three Castles, County Kilkenny, Dermody first played hurling with the local Threecastles club. After a period playing for the Kilkenny club in New York, he returned to Ireland and joined the Tullaroan club with whom he won a county championship medal in 1930.

Dermody first played for Kilkenny as a replacement for the absent Mark McDonald in 1922. He lined out for the team in the earlier rounds of the championship, winning a Leinster medal, but missed the subsequent All-Ireland victory. After almost a decade away from the inter-county scene, Dermody returned as first-choice Kilkenny goalkeeper in 1931. Over the course of the following four seasons he won two All-Ireland medals and three further Leinster medals.

As a member of the Leinster inter-provincial team on a number of occasions, Dermody won back-to-back Railway Cup medals in 1932, as captain, and 1933. He had earlier represented the United States team in the 1928 Tailteann Games.

== Honours ==
Tullaroan

- Kilkenny Senior Hurling Championship (1): 1930

Kilkenny

- All-Ireland Senior Hurling Championship (2): 1932, 1933
- Leinster Senior Hurling Championship (4): 1922, 1931 (c), 1932, 1933

Leinster

- Railway Cup (2): 1932 (c), 1933

Sporting positions
Preceded by	Kilkenny Senior Hurling Captain; 1931	Succeeded by Jimmy Walsh
