= Mark McDonald =

Mark McDonald may refer to:

- Mark McDonald (politician) (born 1980), Scottish politician
- Mark McDonald (hurler) (1888–1952), Irish hurler
- Marc McDonald, American who was Microsoft's first salaried employee

== See also ==
- Mark MacDonald (disambiguation)
- McDonald family, owners of "Mableton" historic house in Santa Rosa
