= Mark MacDonald =

Mark MacDonald may refer to:

- Mark MacDonald (American football), former American football guard
- Mark MacDonald (bishop), former Anglican bishop of the Anglican Church of Canada, previously of the Episcopal Church (United States)
- Mark MacDonald (Vermont politician), Member of the Vermont Senate and former member of the Vermont House of Representatives
- Mark Macdonald, American diet, fitness and health expert

== See also ==
- Mark McDonald (disambiguation)
