= San Mateo, California =

City in California, United States

- City
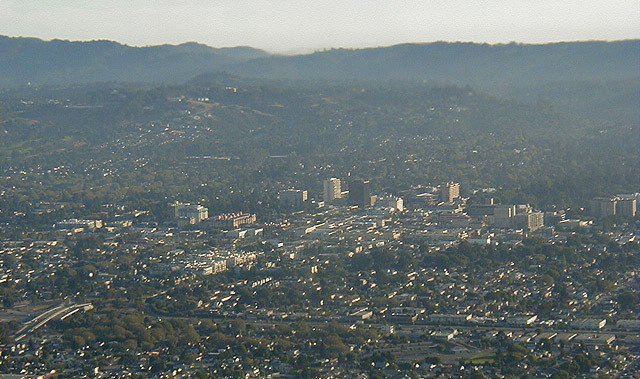
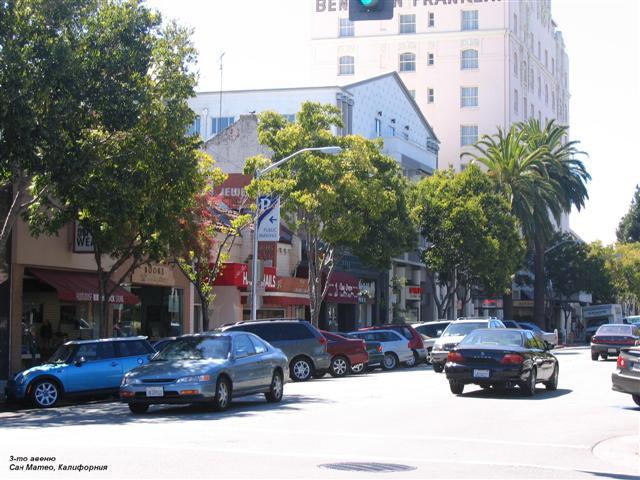
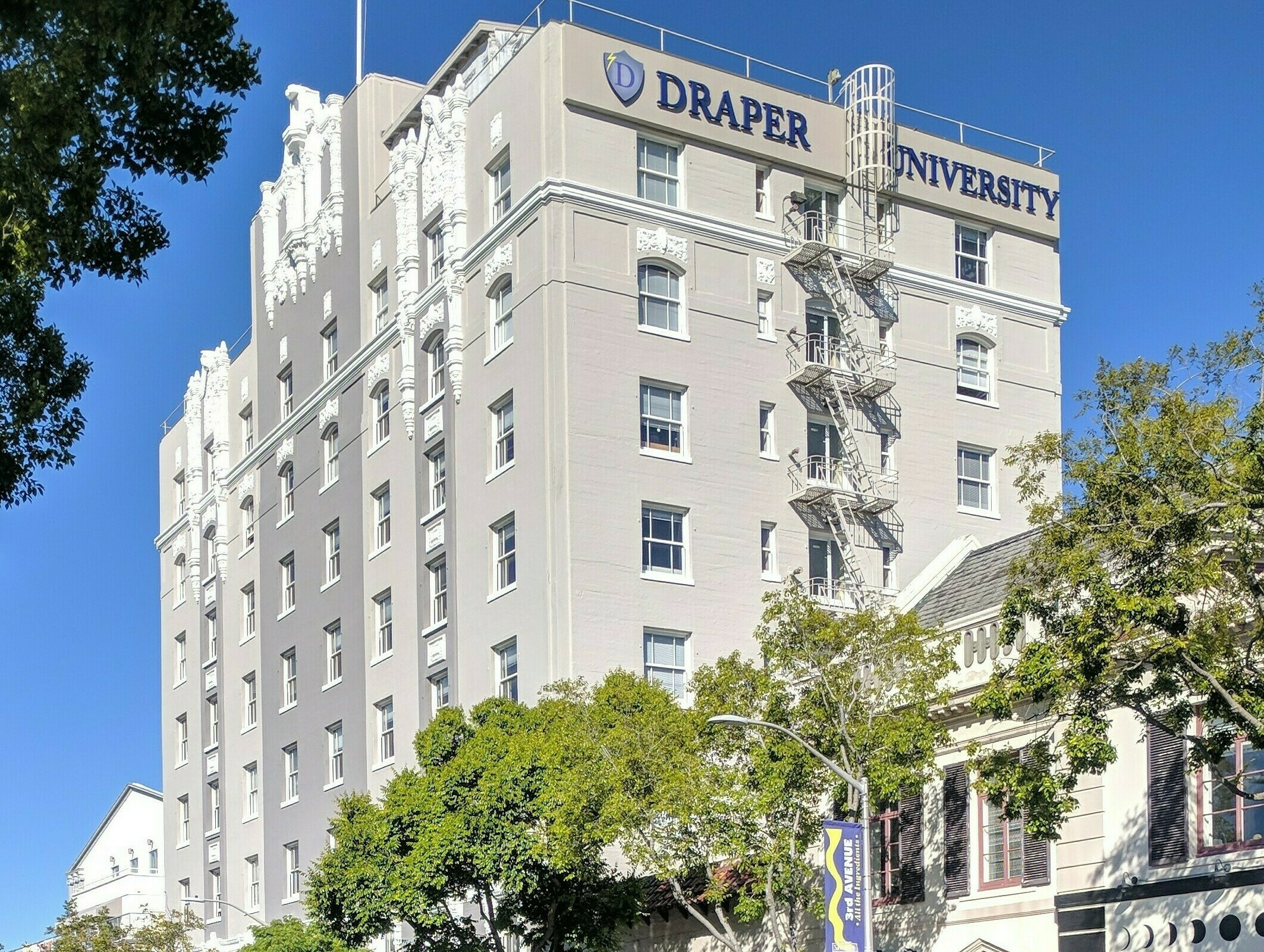
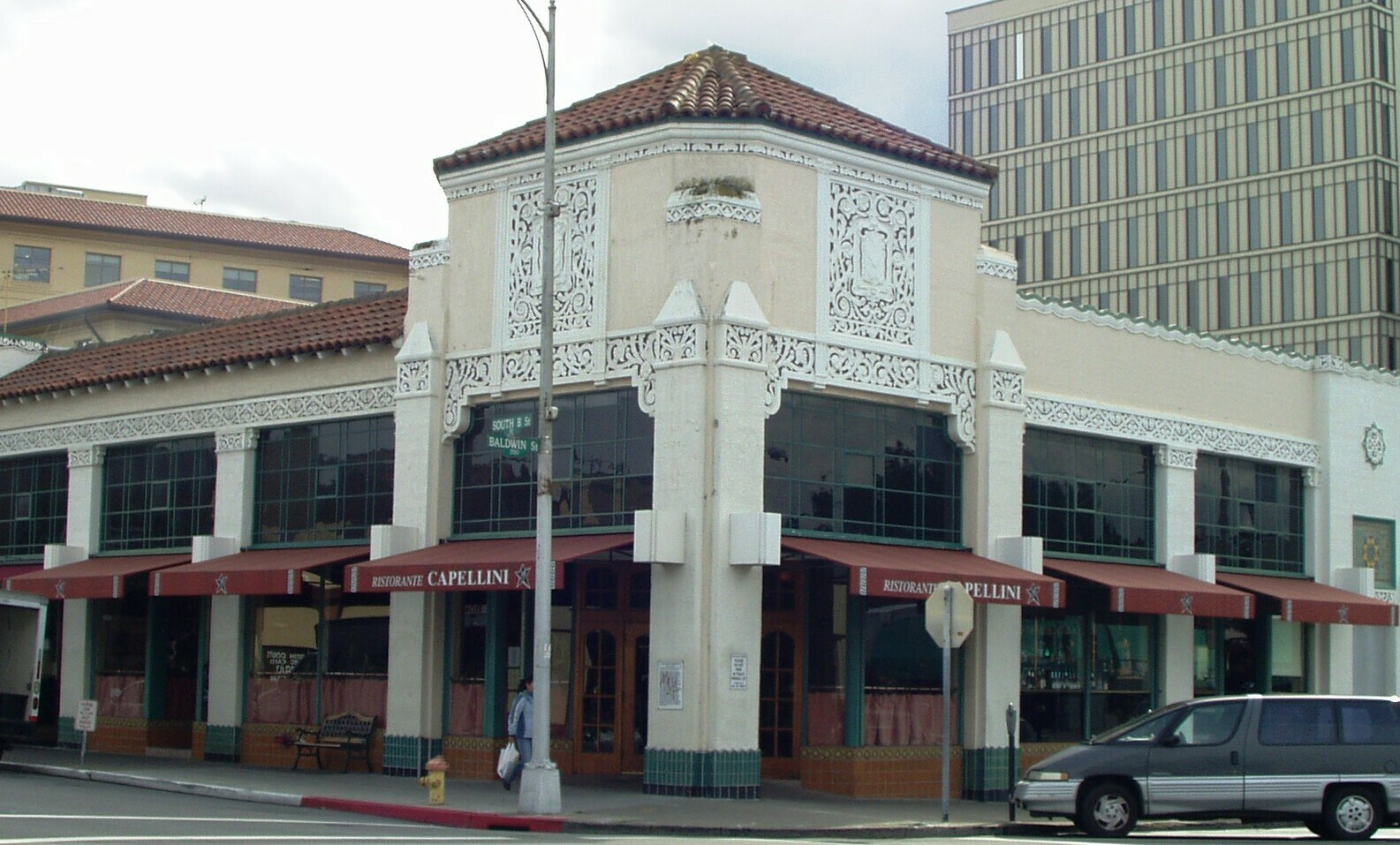
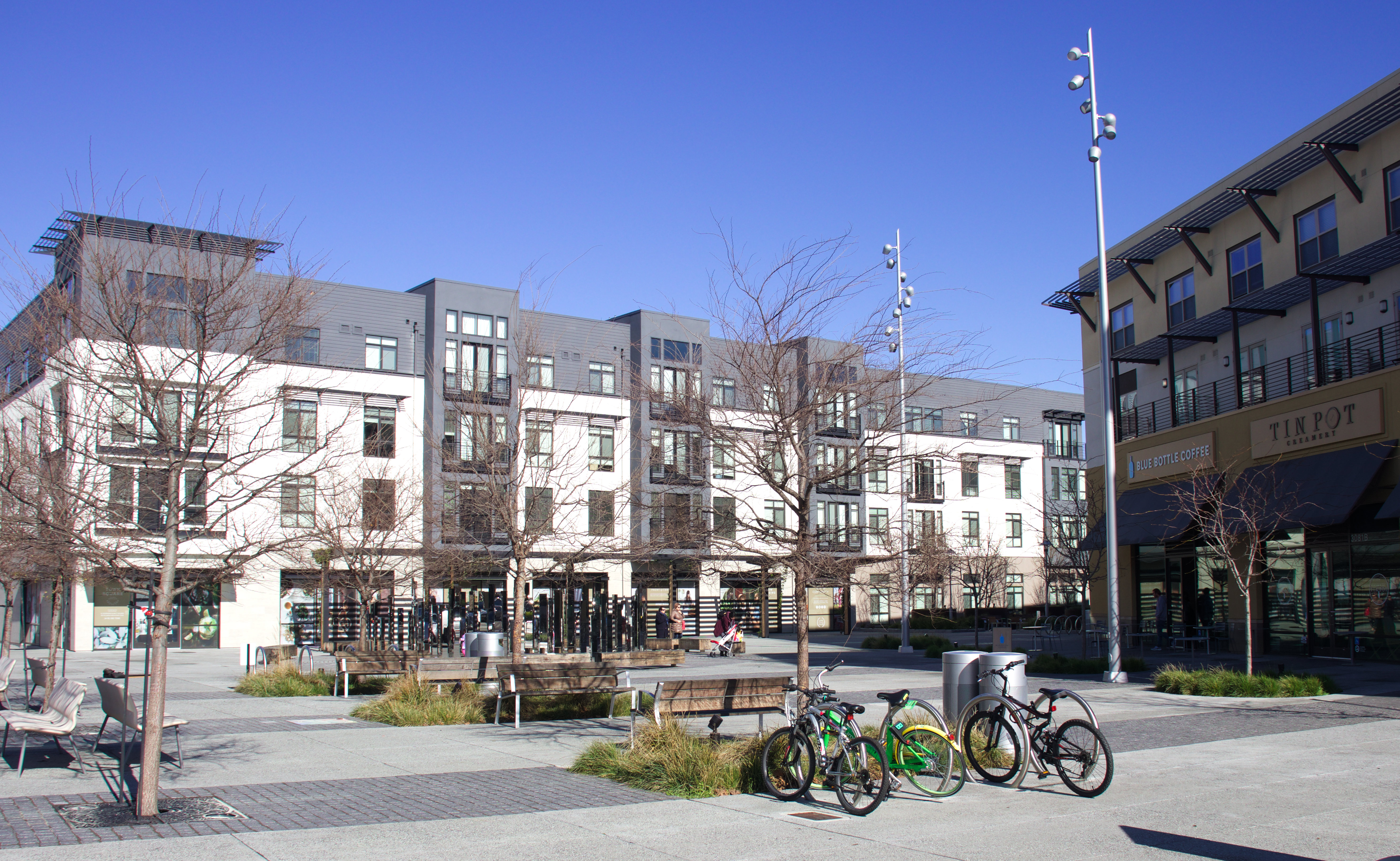
- Top: aerial view of San Mateo; middle: downtown (left) and Draper University (right); bottom: downtown (left) and Bay Meadows (right)

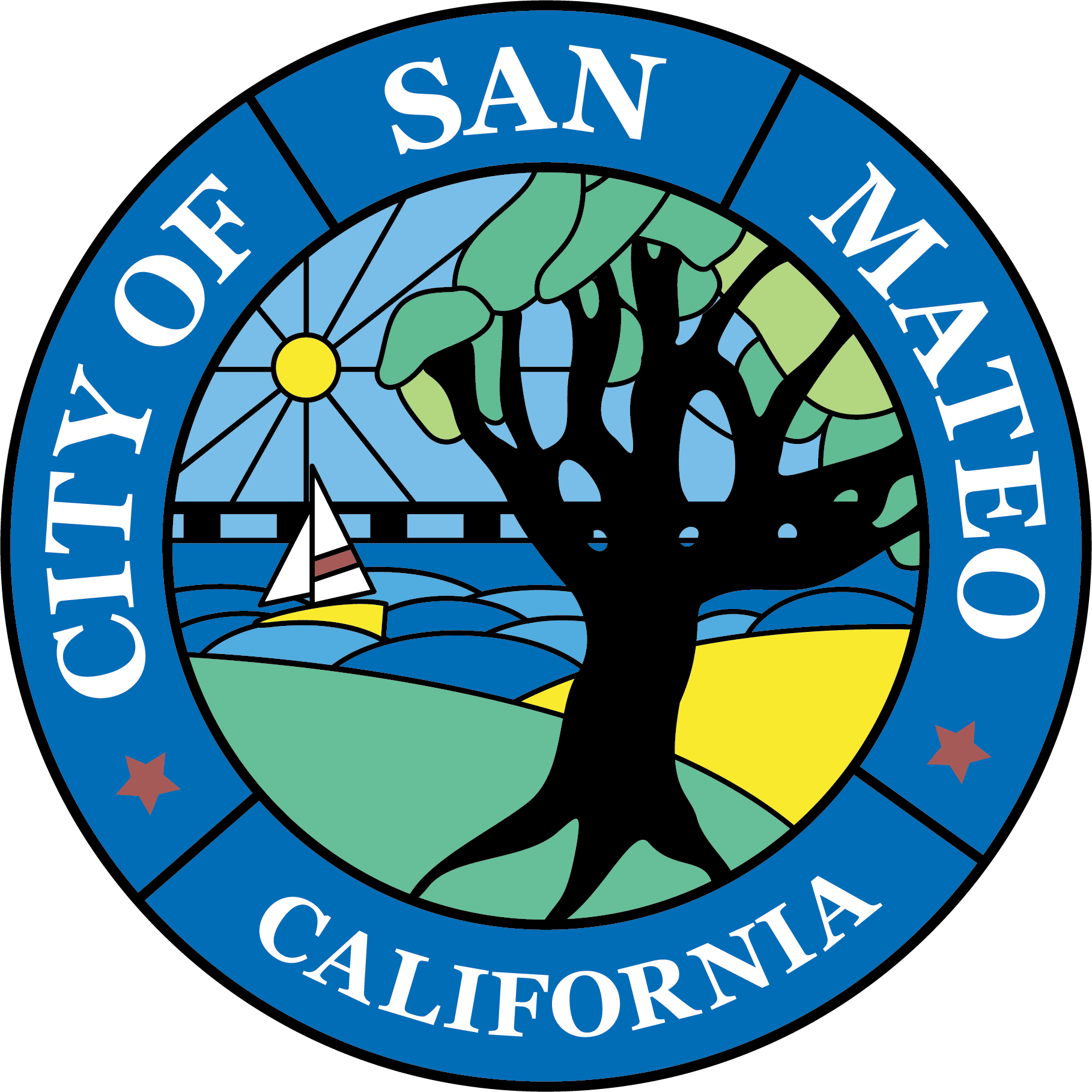
- Seal
- Interactive map of San Mateo, California
- Coordinates: 37°33′15″N 122°18′47″W
- Country: United States
- State: California
- County: San Mateo
- Incorporated: September 4, 1894
- Named for: St. Matthew

Government
  - Mayor: Adam Loraine
  - City manager: Alex Khojikian

Area
  - Total: 15.85 sq mi (41.05 km^{2})
  - Land: 12.14 sq mi (31.43 km^{2})
  - Water: 3.71 sq mi (9.62 km^{2}) 23.44%
- Elevation: 46 ft (14 m)

Population (2020)
  - Total: 105,661
  - Rank: 71st in California; 329th in the United States
  - Density: 8,710/sq mi (3,363/km^{2})
- Time zone: UTC−8 (Pacific)
  - Summer (DST): UTC−7 (PDT)
- ZIP Codes: 94401–94404, 94497
- Area code: 650
- FIPS code: 06-68252
- GNIS feature IDs: 1659584, 2411800
- Website: cityofsanmateo.org

San Mateo (Note: /ˌsæn məˈteɪoʊ/ SAN mə-TAY-oh Spanish for 'Saint Matthew') is the most populous city in San Mateo County, California, United States, on the San Francisco Peninsula. It is part of the San Francisco Bay Area metropolitan region, and is located about 20 miles (32 km) south of San Francisco. San Mateo borders Burlingame to the north, Hillsborough to the west, San Francisco Bay and Foster City to the east and Belmont to the south. The population was 105,661 at the 2020 census. Some of the biggest economic drivers for the city include technology, health care and education.

== History ==
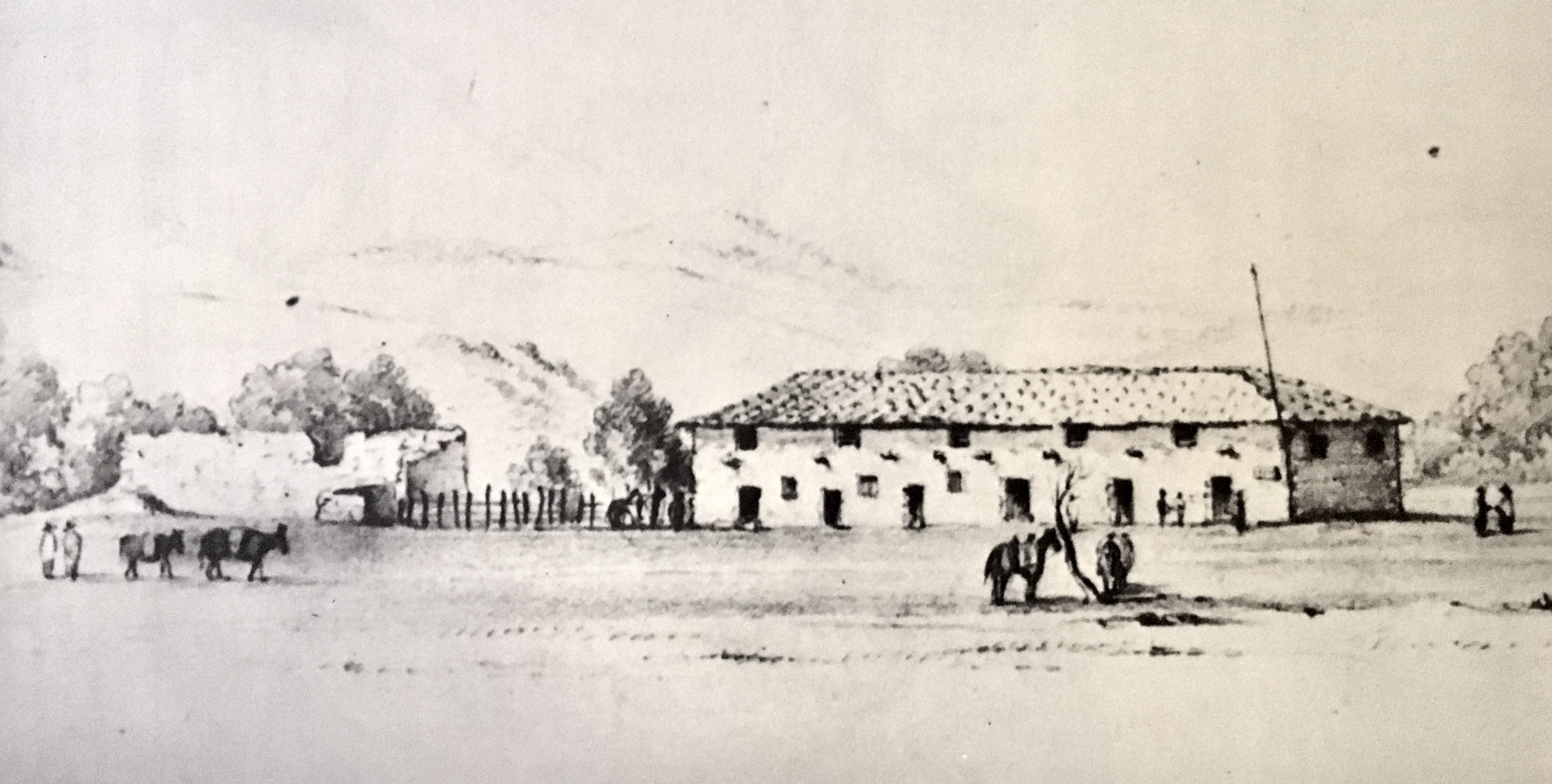
The San Mateo hospice was founded by the Spanish in 1793 as an outpost of Mission San Francisco de Asís in Yerba Buena.

The earliest known settlers of the Bay Area were the Ramaytush people, since at least 10000 BC.

=== Spanish era ===
In 1789, the Spanish missionaries had named a Native American village along Laurel Creek as Los Laureles or the Laurels (Mission Dolores, 1789). At the time of Mexican Independence, 30 native Californians were at San Mateo, most likely from the Salson tribelet.

=== Mexican era ===
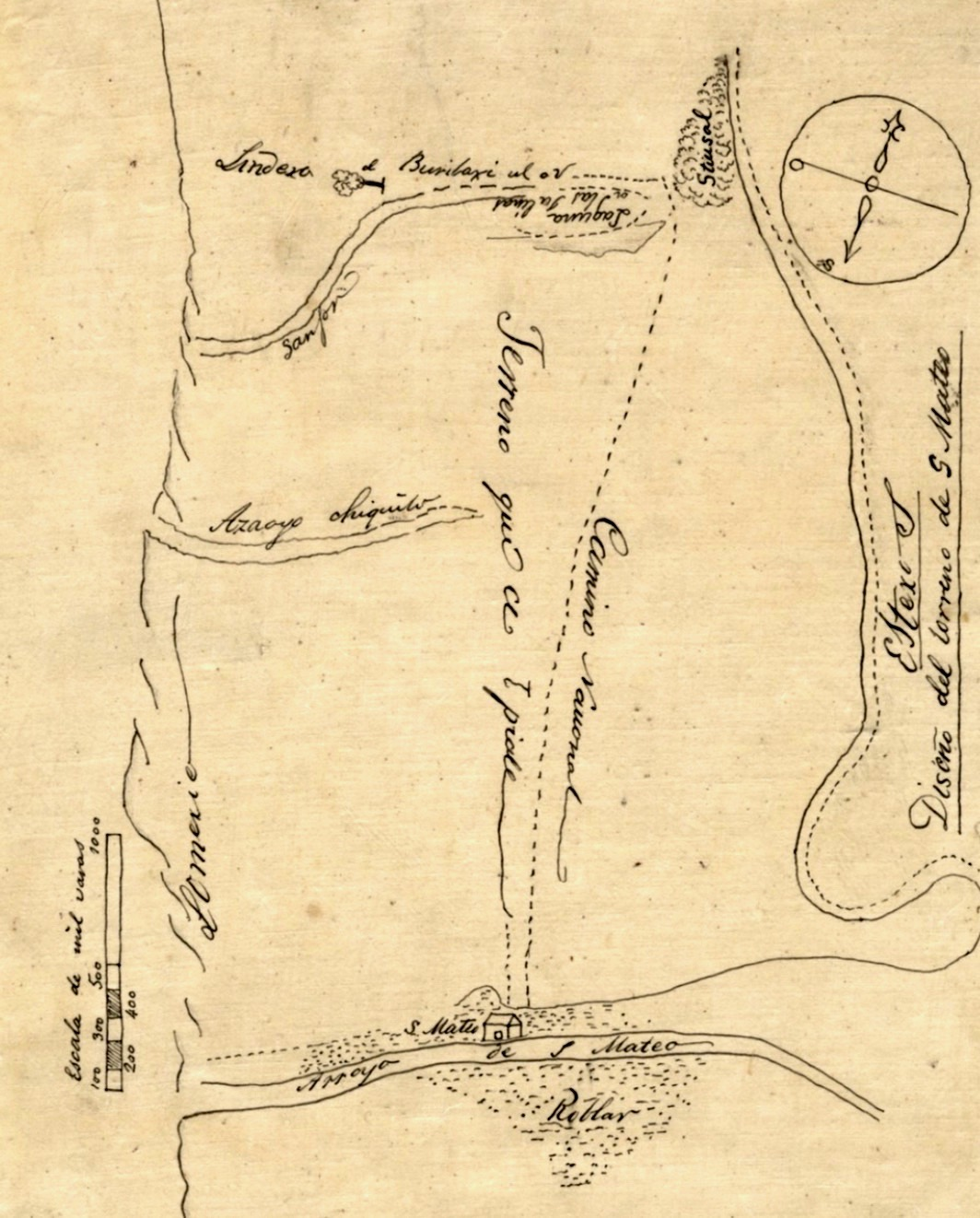
Much of the area was granted to Californio ranchero Cayetano Arenas in 1846 as Rancho San Mateo.

In 1827, Captain Frederick William Beechey was traveling with the hills on their right, known in that part as the Sierra del Sur, began to approach the road, which passing over a small eminence, opened out upon "a wide country of meadow land, with clusters of fine oak free from underwood... It strongly resembled a nobleman's park: herds of cattle and horses were grazing upon the rich pasture, and numerous fallow‑deer, startled at the approach of strangers, bounded off to seek protection among the hills... This spot is named San Matheo, and belongs to the mission of San Francisco."

The city of San Mateo was documented by Spanish colonists as part of the Rancho de las Pulgas and the Rancho San Mateo; the earliest history is held in the archives of Mission Dolores. Rancho San Mateo was granted in May 1846 from Pío Pico to his secretary, Cayetano Arenas; this tract included approximately half of present-day San Mateo, all of Burlingame and Hillsborough, and the Spring Valley lakes (now Crystal Springs Reservoir and San Andreas Lake). William Davis Merry Howard purchased Rancho San Mateo from Arenas in 1846 for US$25,000 (equivalent to $896,000 in 2025) and spent an equal sum erecting a fence around the property.

=== Post-Conquest era ===
In the 1850s, following the American Conquest of California, many San Franciscans began building summer homes in the mid-Peninsula, because of the milder climate. The area that is now the city of San Mateo was owned by a few large landowners, including Howard, whose Rancho San Mateo occupied 6,438 acres (2,605 ha) in 1853 north of San Mateo Creek, pushing most of this early settlement into adjacent Hillsborough, Burlingame, and Belmont; other significant landowners in the area included John Parrott, who purchased 500 acres (200 ha) in 1860 south of the creek and southwest of El Camino Real and Alvinza Hayward, who owned the land south of the creek and east of El Camino. Much of the remaining land south of these areas was used for agriculture until the early 1900s; the owners included John Whipple, who had a large horse farm south of Parrott's land, Lemuel Murray, J.S. Colegrove, and David McClellan.

In 1858, Sun Water Station, a stage station of the Butterfield Overland Mail route, was established in San Mateo. It was 9 miles (14 km) from both Clarks Station (to the north) in what is now San Bruno and the next station south at Redwood City.

Several historically important mansions and buildings were constructed in San Mateo around this time. A.P. Giannini, founder of the Bank of Italy (which later became the Bank of America), lived here most of his life. His mansion, Seven Oaks, is listed in the National Register of Historic Places (No. 99001181). It is located at 20 El Cerrito Avenue.

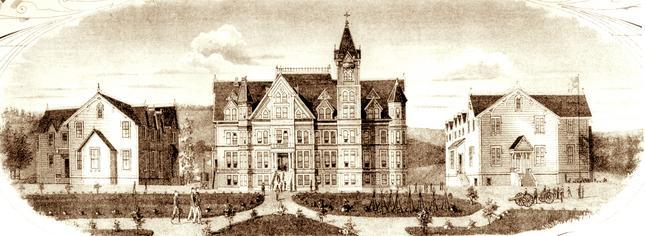
Saint Matthew's Episcopal Day School, founded in 1865

The Howard Estate was built in 1859 on the hill accessed by Crystal Springs Road; the building, named El Cerrito, eventually was moved to Hillsborough and served as its Town Hall starting from in 1910, but it has since been demolished. The Parrott Estate was erected in 1860 in the same area, giving rise to two conflicting names for the hill, Howard Hill and Parrot Hill. After use of the automobile changed traffic patterns, neither historic name was commonly applied to that hill. Once San Mateo was incorporated on September 4, 1894, its first mayor was Captain A.H. Payson, a son-in-law of Parrott.

When the San Francisco and San Jose Railroad was under construction during the 1860s, one of its corporate directors, Charles Polhemus, purchased the land south of the creek, now the site of downtown San Mateo, and began laying out the town; the first town plat was laid out in 1862. Polhemus settled on the land which is now Central Park and one of the succeeding owners, William Kohl, built the iron and stone fence which still encloses the park.

The Borel Estate was developed near Borel Creek in 1874 by Antoine Borel. It has been redeveloped since the late 20th century for use as modern offices and shops. The property is managed and owned by Borel Place Associates and the Borel Estate Company.

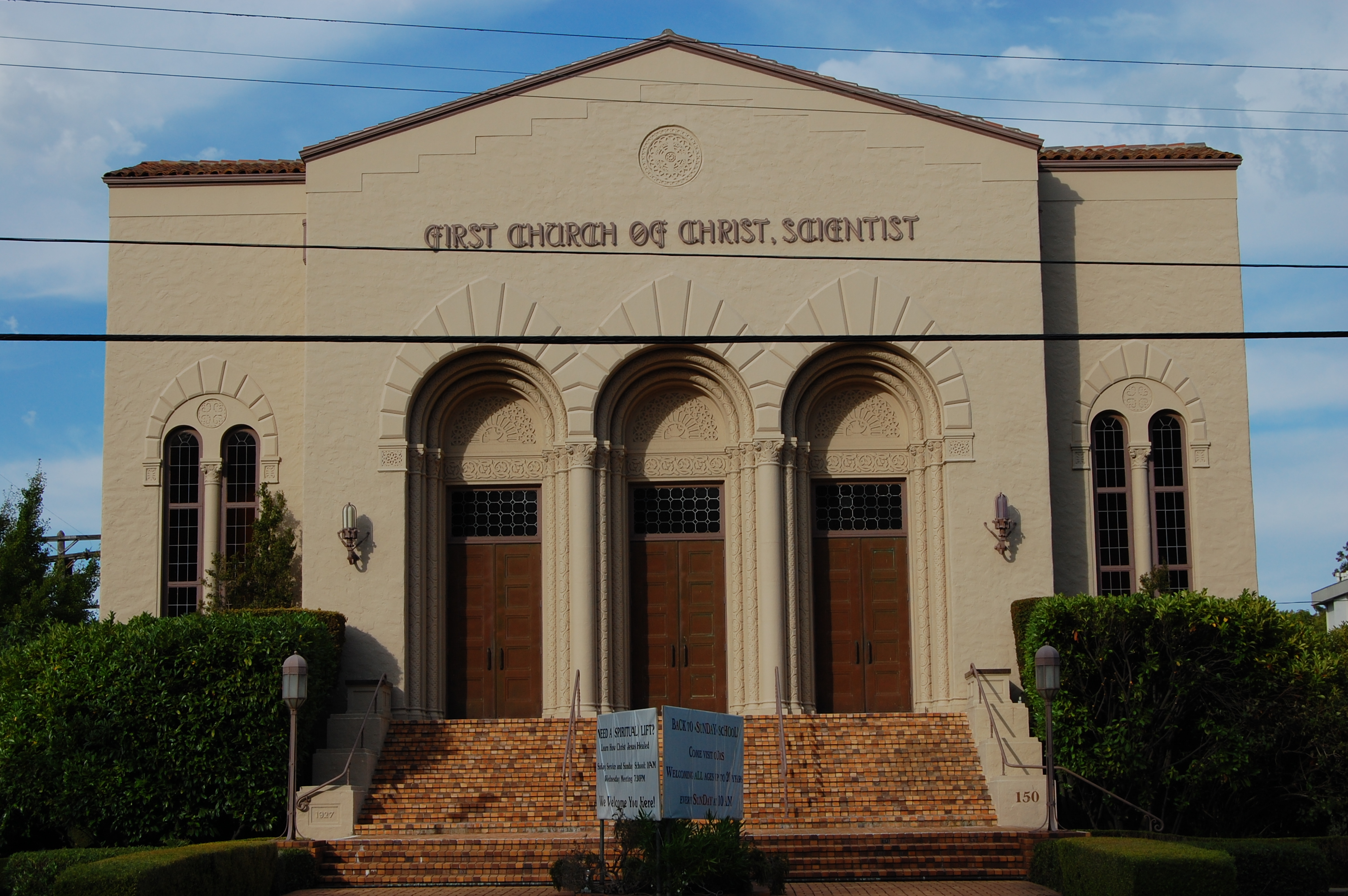
First Church of Christ, Scientist, established in 1897

Hayward Park, the 1880 American Queen Anne-style residence of Alvinza Hayward (often said to be "California's first millionaire" from his silver and banking fortunes), was built on an 800-acre (3.2 km^{2}) estate in San Mateo which included a deer park and racetrack, roughly bounded by present-day El Camino Real (on the west), 9th Avenue (on the north), B Street (on the east) and 16th Avenue (on the south). A smaller portion of the property and the mansion, was converted into The Peninsula Hotel in 1908, following Hayward's death in 1904. The hotel burned down in a spectacular fire on June 25, 1920.

William H. Howard, eldest son of W.D.M. Howard, is credited with the first subdivisions in the region, resulting in what is now the Western Addition of San Mateo in 1888; he followed up by creating the first subdivision of Burlingame and Highland Park in San Mateo.

=== 20th century ===
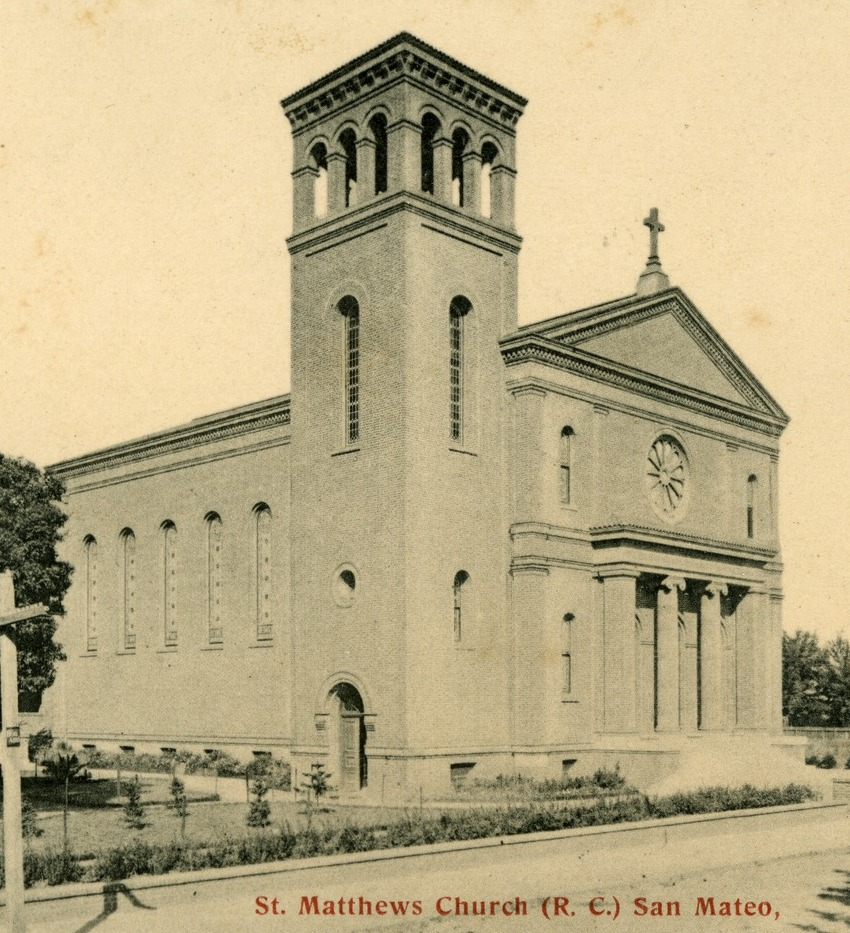
San Mateo Church, c. 1906

In 1893, Pedro Evencio had been called the last of the Ramaytush Native American of San Mateo. Although Joseph (José) Evencio (the younger) was reported to be his descendant living at Coyote Point until World War II, "Indian Joe", (Joe Mestes) was the American Indian who was actually hired by the Howard family to oversee their land holding at Coyote Point. He is reported to have had a tribal affiliation in Montana. His final whereabouts were reported to be a care facility in Oakland after he had been removed from Coyote Point when a Merchant Marine Academy was established there.

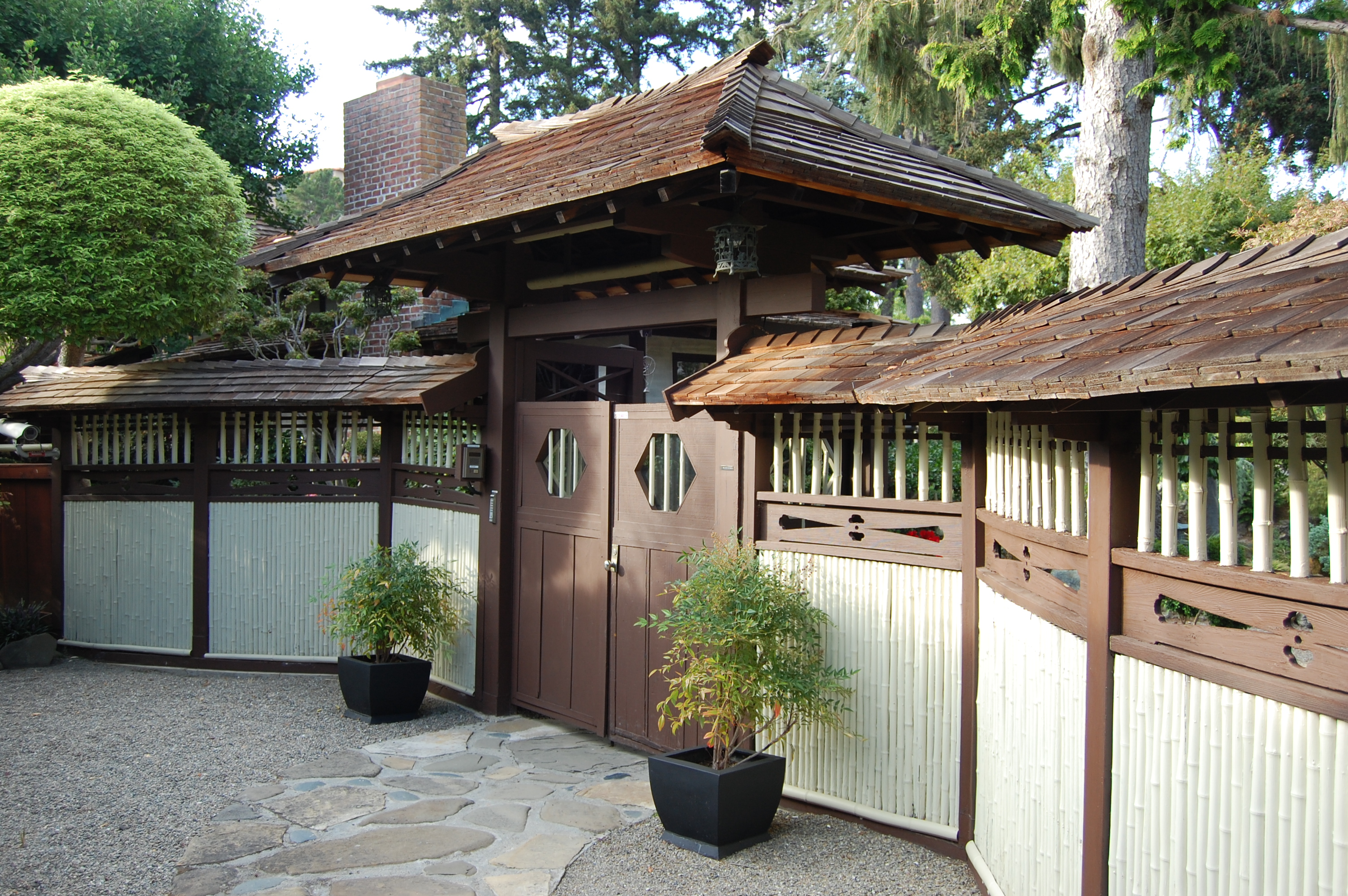
Eugene J. de Sabla, Jr., Teahouse and Tea Garden

In the early 20th century, Japanese immigrants came to San Mateo to work in the salt ponds and flower industry. Although Japanese-Americans only account for 2.2% of the population today, they continue to be a major cultural influence and a draw for the rest of the region. The Eugene J. De Sabla Japanese Teahouse and Garden was established in 1894 at 70 De Sabla Road, designed by Makoto Hagiwara, designer of the Japanese garden in Golden Gate Park in San Francisco. He arranged for Japanese artisans to be brought to the United States primarily for its teahouse construction. The parcel was purchased in 1988 by San Francisco businessman Achille Paladini and wife Joan, who have restored it. The garden features hundreds of varieties of plants and several rare trees. A large koi pond surrounds an island. The property was placed on the National Register of Historic Places in 1992.

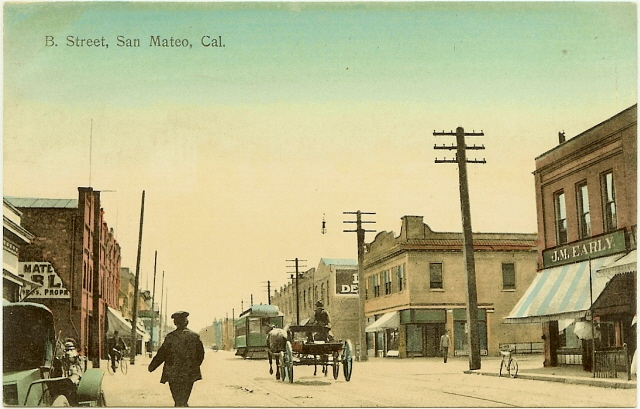
Interurban Railroad Car riding in downtown San Mateo, c. 1909

In December 1967, Sgt. Joe Artavia, then serving in Vietnam with Alpha Company, 1st Battalion, 327th Infantry Regiment of the 101st Airborne Division wrote to his sister, Linda Giese, who was a resident of San Carlos working in San Mateo, asking if San Mateo or San Francisco could adopt the company, saying that it would bring "the morale of the guys up as high as the clouds". San Mateo passed a resolution on March 4, 1968, officially adopting Alpha Company and letters and gifts began arriving from the citizens of San Mateo. Joe would be killed in action on March 24, 1968, less than three weeks after the resolution. Linda would travel to Vietnam to meet with the men of Alpha Company for Christmas in 1968 and deliver personalized medallions from the City of San Mateo. In 1972, San Mateo requested and received permission to have Alpha Company visit the city when they left Vietnam, later holding a parade in January 1972, believed to be the only parade honoring the military during the Vietnam War. In 1988, Joseph Brazan wrote a screenplay entitled A Dove Among Eagles chronicling the adoption of Alpha Company by San Mateo and the real-life romance between Linda and Artavia's commander, Lt. Stephen Patterson. The city expanded its support to the entire 1st Battalion in 1991, when they were deployed to Kuwait under Operation Desert Storm.

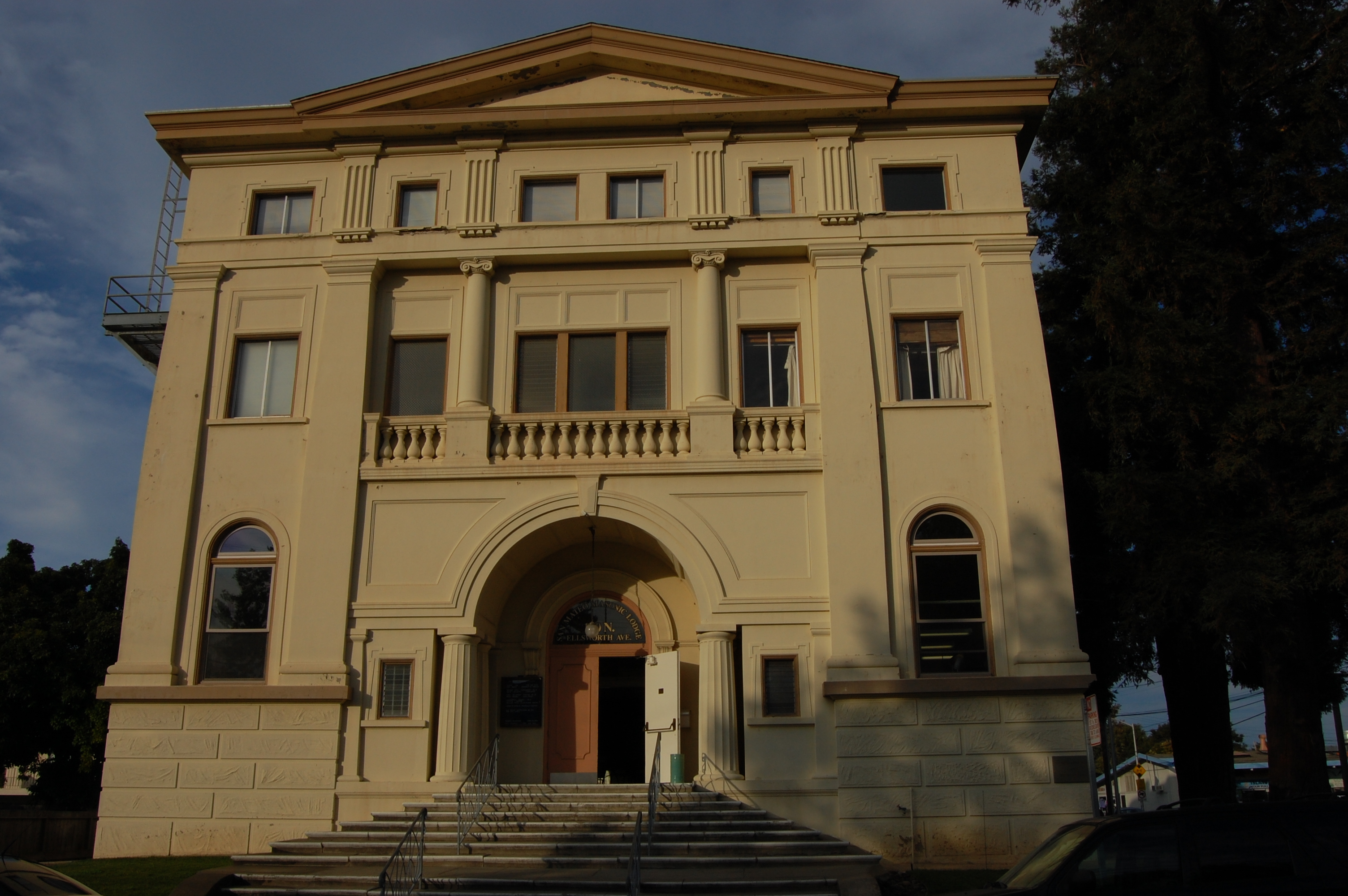
San Mateo Masonic Lodge, completed in 1910

=== 21st century ===
Bay Meadows horse-racing track was torn down in 2008.

== Geography ==
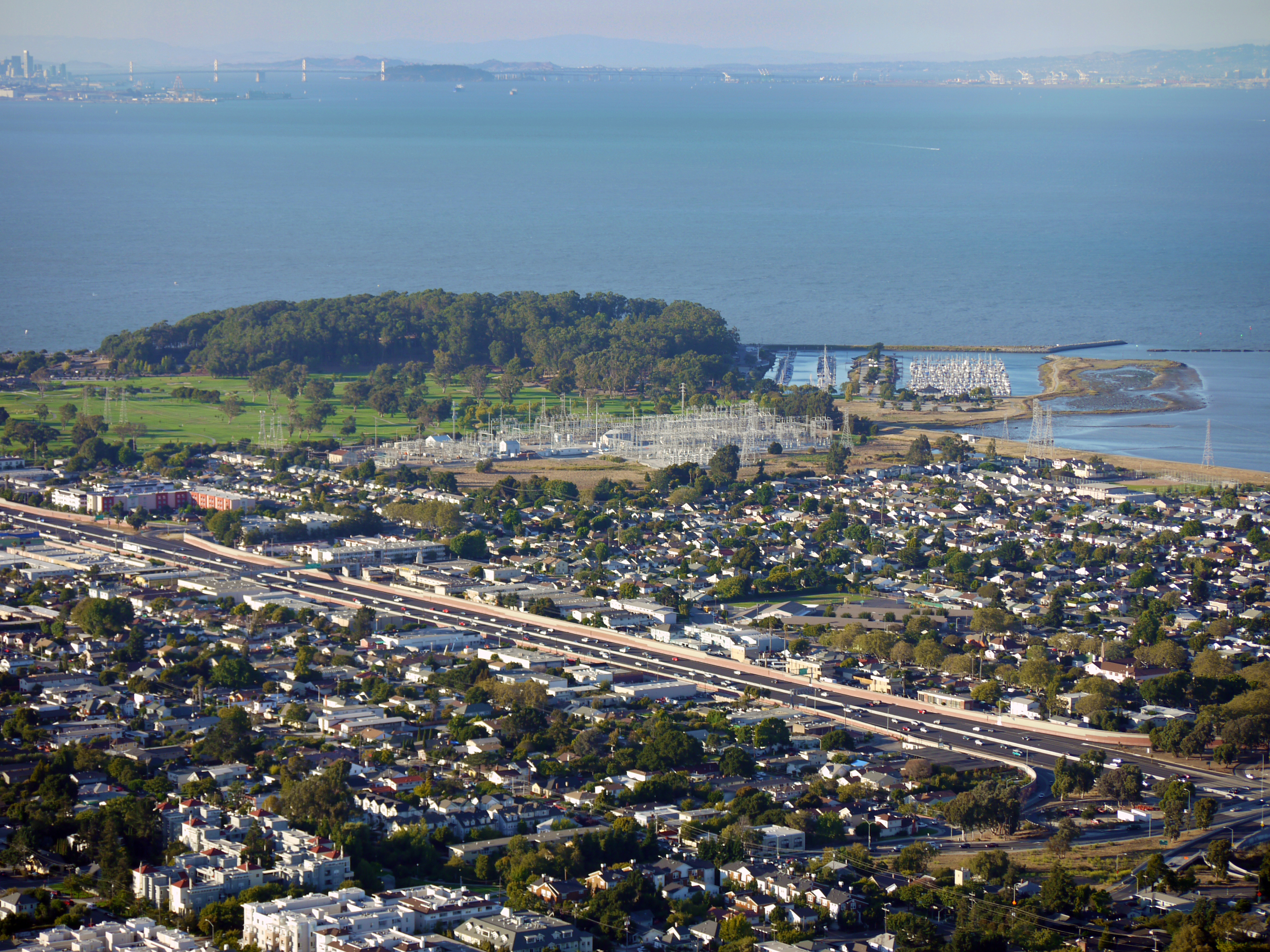
Aerial view of Coyote Point Park, directed northeast towards San Francisco Bay and the Bay Bridge

According to the United States Census Bureau, the city has a total area of 15.8 square miles (41 km^{2}), of which 12.1 square miles (31 km^{2}) are land and 3.7 square miles (9.6 km^{2}), comprising 23.44%, are covered by water.

The best-known natural area is Coyote Point Park, a rock outcropped peninsula that juts out into the San Francisco Bay. The early Spanish navigators named it la punta de San Mateo. Crews of American cargo ships carrying grain in the bay renamed it Big Coyote. Sailors had a penchant for naming promontories at the edge of San Francisco Bay after the coyote; across the bay in Fremont are the Coyote Hills, part of Coyote Hills Regional Park. By the 1890s, the shore area was developed as a popular beach called San Mateo Beach. In 1842, the Spanish had named it playa de San Mateo. Today, Coyote Point is home to CuriOdyssey, formerly known as the Coyote Point Museum, a major natural history museum and wildlife center in the state. The animal care facility for the Peninsula Humane Society is also situated at Coyote Point, where the adoption facility is located in Burlingame.

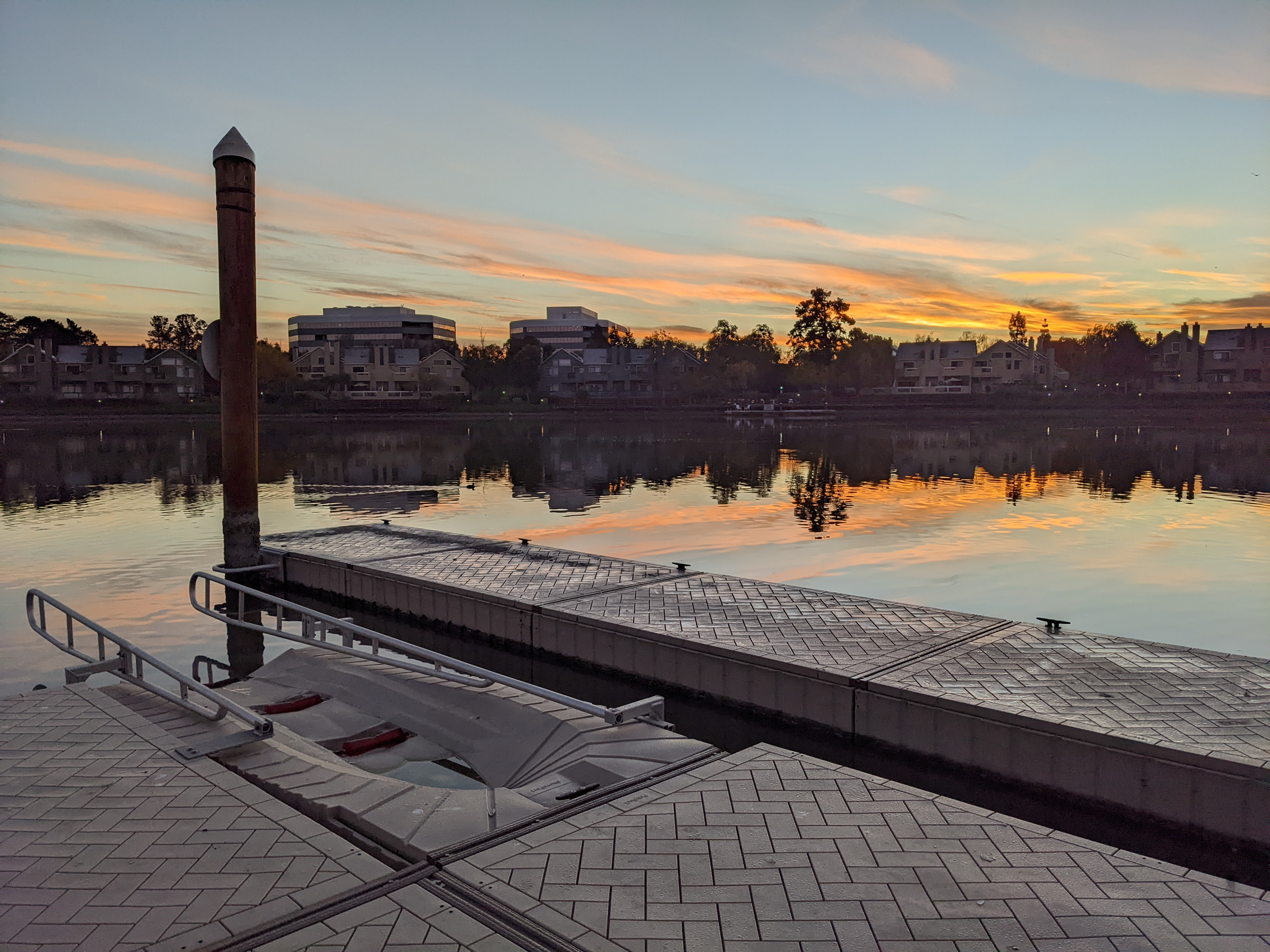
Parkside Aquatic Park on Marina Lagoon

The variety of natural habitats includes mixed oak woodland, riparian zones, and bayland marshes. One endangered species, the California clapper rail, was sighted feeding on mudflats by the Third Avenue bridge in San Mateo. The marsh areas are also likely habitat for the endangered salt marsh harvest mouse, which inhabits the middle and high zones of salt and brackish marshes, as well as for the endangered marsh plant, Point Reyes bird's beak.

Sugarloaf Mountain, whose name has been documented in 1870, is a prominent landform between the forks of Laurel Creek. In the late 20th century, this mixed oak woodland and chaparral habitat was a site of controversy related to proposals to develop a portion of the mountain for residential use. It has been preserved for use as park and open space area, and is home to the endangered mission blue butterfly.

Sawyer Camp Trail, located on the western edge of San Mateo along the Crystal Springs Reservoir, is another popular destination for joggers, pedestrians, and bikers. This roughly 6-mile (9.7 km) trail begins in San Mateo and stretches north toward Hillsborough and San Bruno, parallel to the 280 freeway.

=== Neighborhoods ===
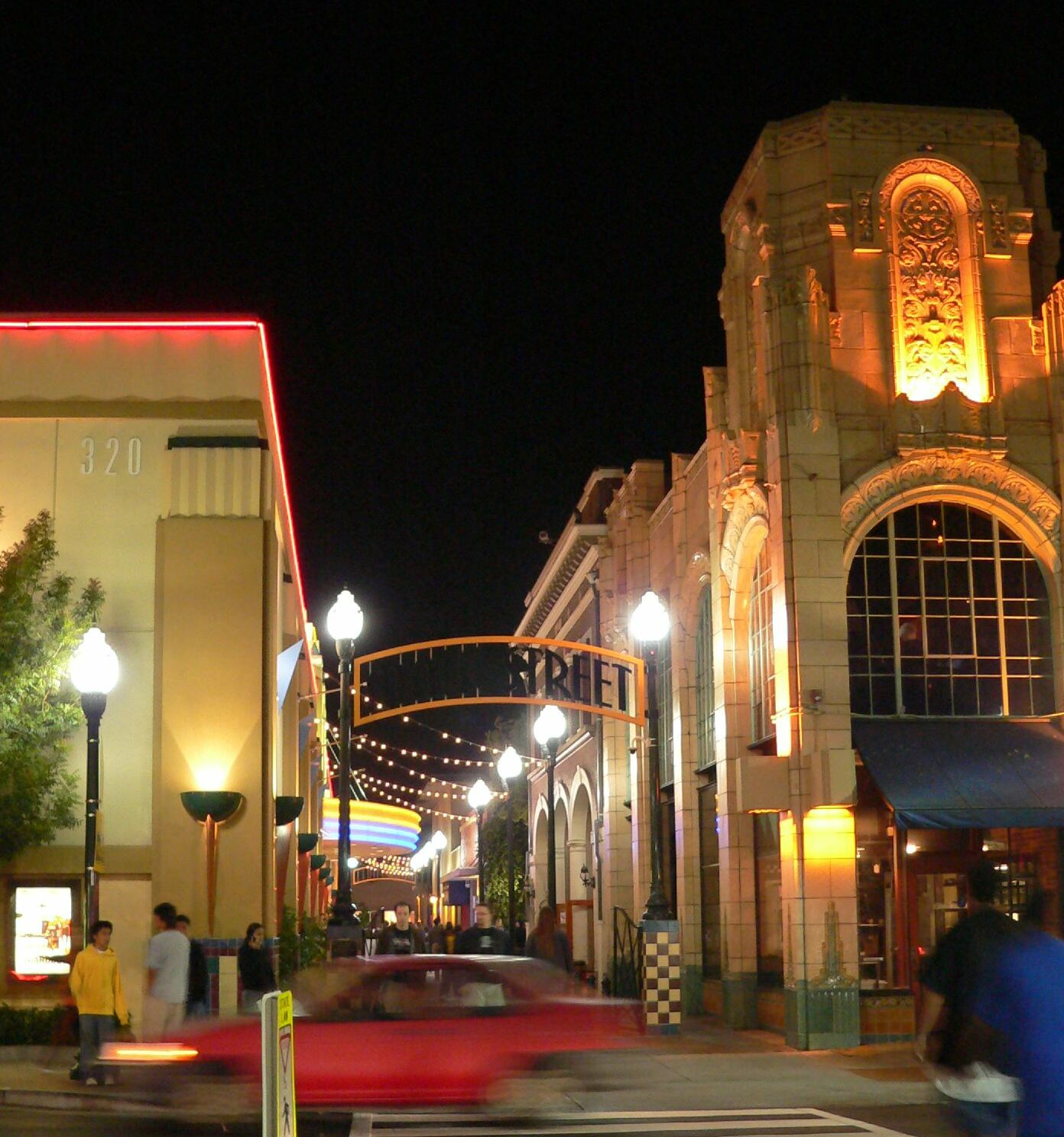
"Main Street" alley in downtown

In general, San Mateo's downtown core and the neighborhoods east of El Camino Real are more populous and have a greater density than the neighborhoods to the west of El Camino Real, where there is a lower population density.

==== Downtown ====
San Mateo has one of the larger, better-developed suburban downtowns in the San Francisco Bay Area. It is located roughly between Tilton Ave. to the northwest, 9th Ave. to the southeast, Delaware St. to the northeast and El Camino Real to the southwest. The downtown core contains over 800 shops and restaurants, many located in historic buildings from the late 19th and early 20th centuries. The non-profit Downtown San Mateo Association (DSMA) works on behalf of downtown businesses to promote them and improve the downtown area.

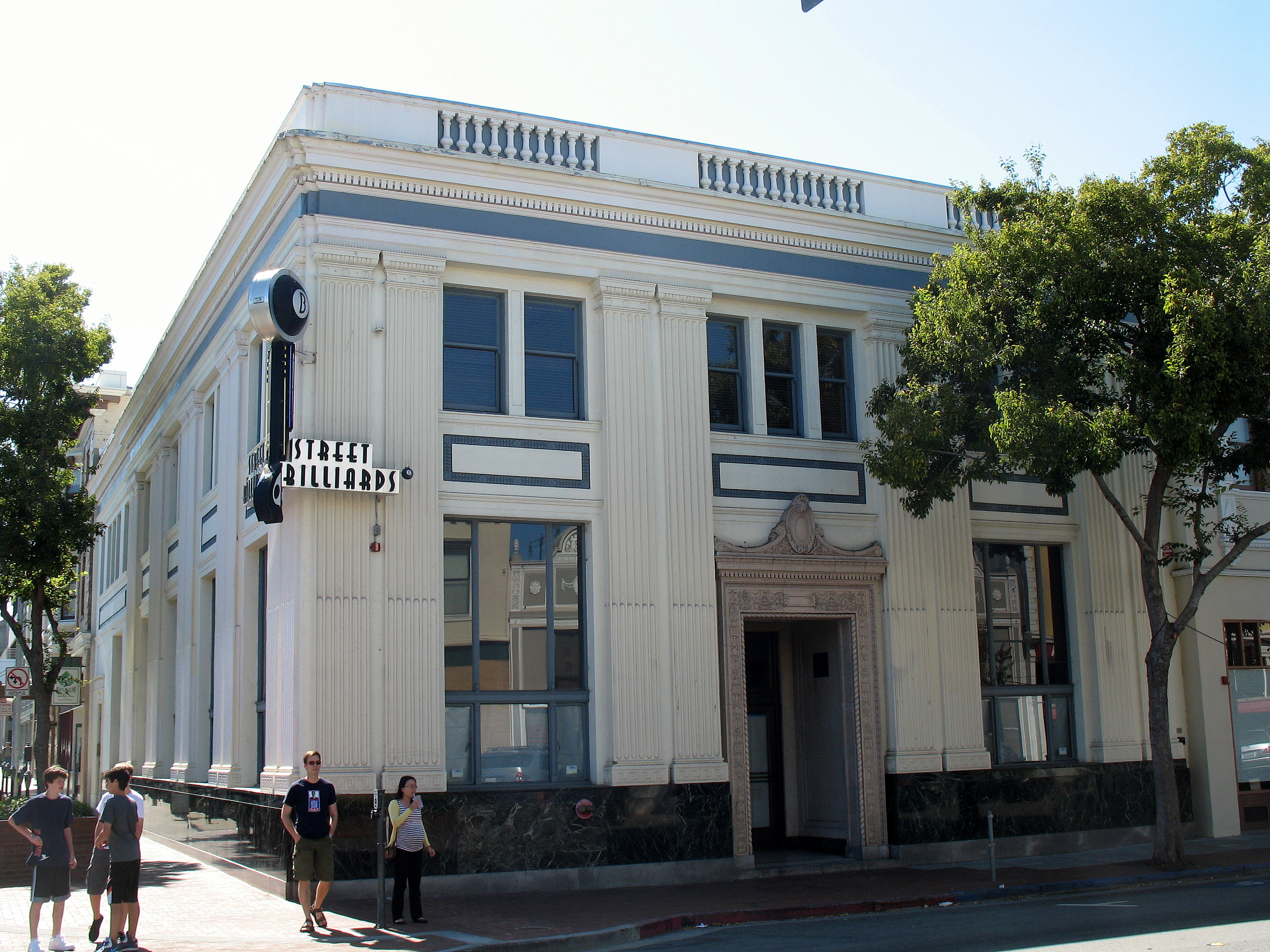
The historic National Bank of San Mateo, located in downtown

Central Park is considered to be San Mateo's signature park with a baseball field, tennis courts, sculptures, picnic areas, playground, Japanese tea garden, recreation center, miniature train, rose garden and the San Mateo Arboretum. The 16.3-acre (6.6 ha) property was purchased by the city in 1922. A historically influential area for the Japanese-American community, the downtown is home to many Japanese restaurants and shops. A large, 12-screen movie theater complex is located off the Main Street alley between 2nd and 3rd Ave. The San Mateo Caltrain station is situated downtown. The area also contains many large and small multi-story office buildings, apartments, government buildings and Mills Medical Center.

Segments of South B Street between 1st and 3rd Ave. and the southbound lane between Baldwin and 1st Ave. were temporarily closed to vehicular traffic in 2020 to allow for expanded outdoor dining. The San Mateo City Council extended the temporary closure through the end of 2021 and voted in September 2021 to create a permanent pedestrian mall between 1st and 3rd Ave. The plan requires a 12-foot (3.7 m) fire lane in the center of the street for public safety vehicles and necessary garbage or delivery services. The city aims to conduct the project in two phases: First, by installing retractable bollards and updating traffic signals and signage, then by raising the level of the street to be flush with sidewalk and reimagining its landscaping.

==== Bay Meadows ====
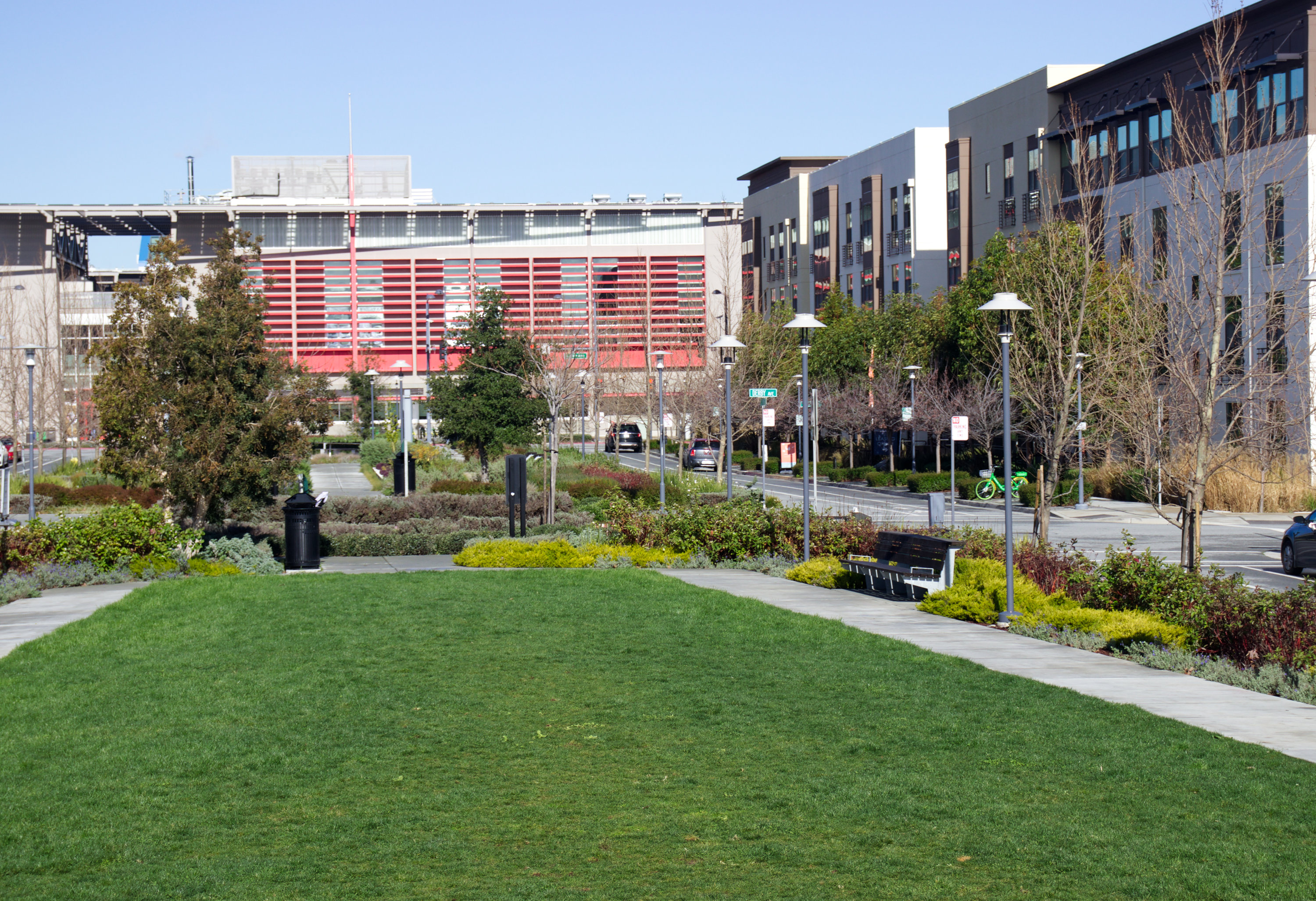
Landing Green in Bay Meadows

The Bay Meadows neighborhood is an 83-acre (34 ha) mixed-use transit-oriented development on the site of the former Bay Meadows Racetrack, a horse racing venue that closed in 2008. The area includes hundreds of new residential units, office space, retail space and parks and a town square. Ground broke in 2012 and construction on various projects continues as of 2021.

==== Hillsdale ====
Hillsdale Shopping Center is a mall in San Mateo County, featuring over 120 stores in the mall itself and surrounded by many big box stores. Tenants include anchors Nordstrom, Ethan Allen and Macy's. The construction of a new food court and the outdoor North Block Plaza expanded the mall in 2019. New entertainment additions include luxury movie theater Cinépolis and a Pinstripes bowling alley off El Camino Real. The Hillsdale Caltrain station is located across El Camino.

== Climate ==
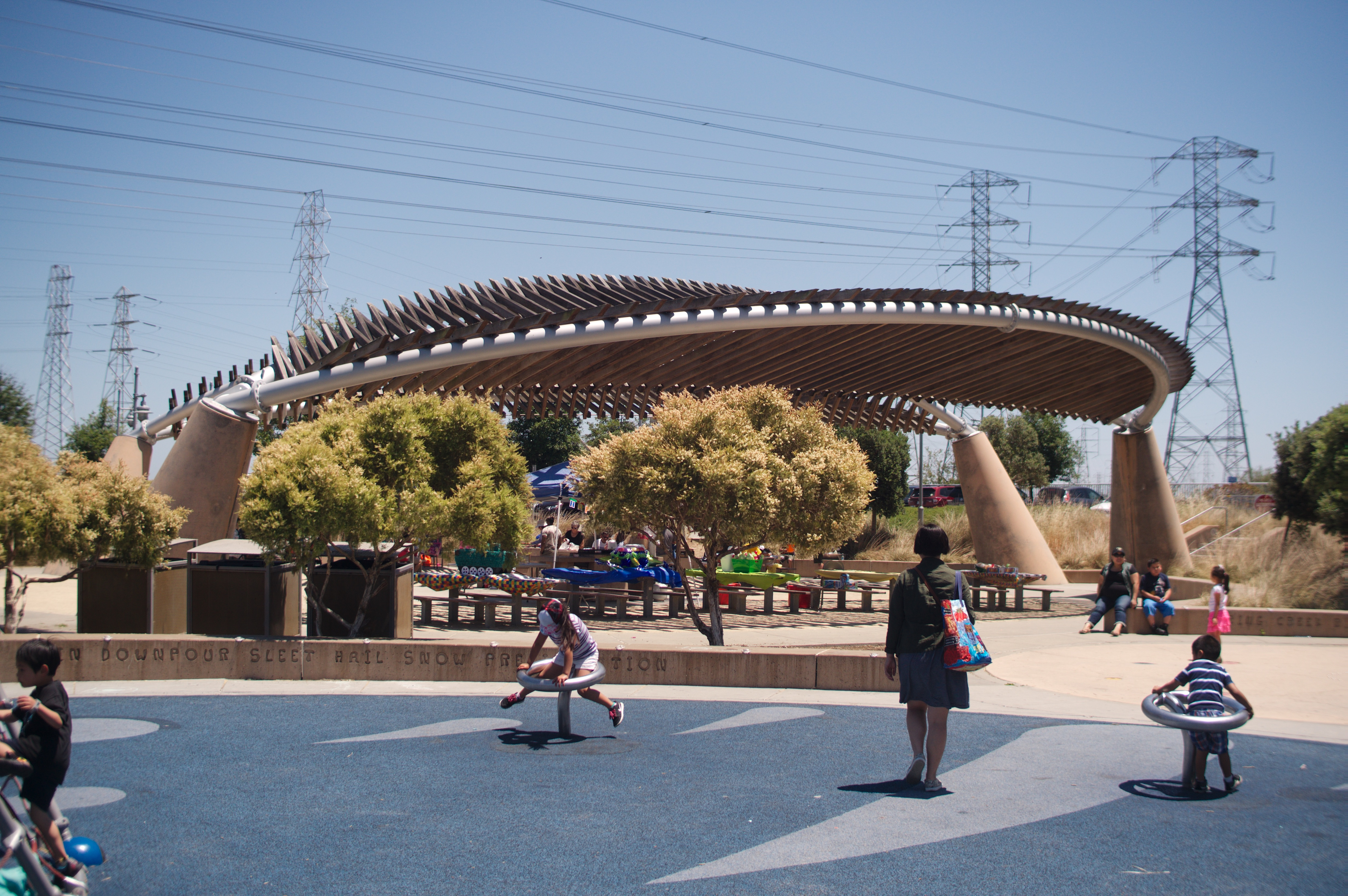
The pavilion at Ryder Park

San Mateo has a Warm-summer Mediterranean climate (Csb) with warm, dry summers and mild, damp winters. The city is generally shielded from the Pacific Ocean by the Montara Mountain block of the Santa Cruz Mountains, but two gaps in the mountains (the San Bruno Gap, between Montara Mountain and San Bruno Mountain; and the Crystal Springs Gap, near where State Route 92 meets State Route 35, west of the College of San Mateo) can channel ocean weather, resulting in gusty afternoon winds that bring fog toward San Mateo in the late afternoon through early morning in the summer.

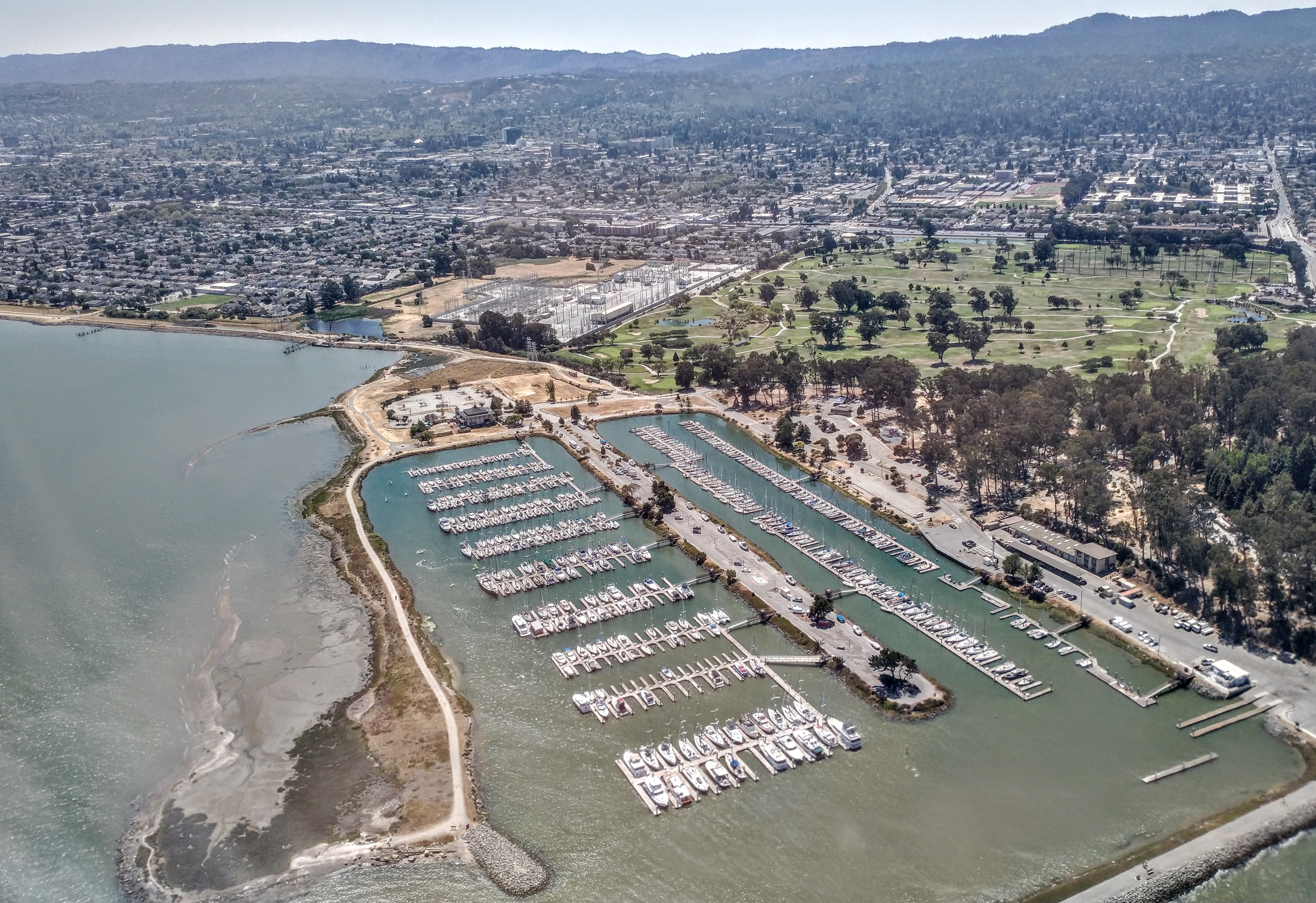
Coyote Point Marina

The National Weather Service maintained a cooperative weather station in San Mateo until 1978; records for the period show that January, the coolest month, had an average maximum of 57.8 °F (14.3 °C) and an average minimum of 41.7 °F (5.4 °C), and September, the warmest month, had an average maximum of 78.0 °F (25.6 °C) and an average minimum of 54.2 °F (12.3 °C). The record maximum temperature was 109 °F (43 °C) on June 14, 1961, and the record minimum temperature was 25 °F (−4 °C) on January 5, 1949, and December 9, 1972. Annual precipitation averaged 18.77 inches (477 mm) of rainfall, falling on an average of 60 days each year. The wettest year was 29.77 inches (756 mm) in 1973 and the driest year was 11.16 inches (283 mm) of rainfall in 1953. The most precipitation in one month was 12.59 inches (320 mm) of rainfall in December 1955 and the most precipitation in 24 hours was 3.72 inches (94 mm) of rainfall on December 23, 1955. Based on comparison with the existing NWS office at San Francisco International Airport, San Mateo is generally a few degrees warmer in summer than the airport and a few degrees cooler in winter, while annual precipitation is almost the same at the airport and in San Mateo. In recent years, daily temperature reports for San Mateo from local weather observers have been published in the San Mateo Times and the San Francisco Chronicle.

Climate data for San Mateo, California
Month	Jan	Feb	Mar	Apr	May	Jun	Jul	Aug	Sep	Oct	Nov	Dec	Year
Record high °F (°C)	78 (26)	80 (27)	88 (31)	89 (32)	98 (37)	109 (43)	108 (42)	103 (39)	107 (42)	96 (36)	89 (32)	78 (26)	109 (43)
Mean daily maximum °F (°C)	58.0 (14.4)	61.5 (16.4)	63.9 (17.7)	67.0 (19.4)	70.5 (21.4)	74.4 (23.6)	76.7 (24.8)	76.6 (24.8)	77.8 (25.4)	73.0 (22.8)	65.4 (18.6)	59.0 (15.0)	68.6 (20.4)
Daily mean °F (°C)	49.7 (9.8)	52.7 (11.5)	54.5 (12.5)	57.0 (13.9)	60.2 (15.7)	63.5 (17.5)	65.2 (18.4)	65.4 (18.6)	65.8 (18.8)	62.1 (16.7)	55.7 (13.2)	50.8 (10.4)	58.5 (14.7)
Mean daily minimum °F (°C)	41.5 (5.3)	43.9 (6.6)	45.3 (7.4)	46.9 (8.3)	49.9 (9.9)	52.7 (11.5)	53.8 (12.1)	54.2 (12.3)	53.8 (12.1)	51.2 (10.7)	46.2 (7.9)	42.6 (5.9)	48.5 (9.2)
Record low °F (°C)	23 (−5)	29 (−2)	31 (−1)	31 (−1)	36 (2)	40 (4)	42 (6)	46 (8)	40 (4)	36 (2)	29 (−2)	25 (−4)	23 (−5)
Average precipitation inches (mm)	4.64 (118)	3.17 (81)	2.75 (70)	1.31 (33)	0.46 (12)	0.13 (3.3)	0.04 (1.0)	0.04 (1.0)	0.16 (4.1)	0.91 (23)	2.11 (54)	3.39 (86)	19.11 (486.4)
Average precipitation days (≥ 0.01 in)	11	10	9	5	3	1	0	0	1	3	7	10	60
Source: Western Regional Climate Center

== Demographics ==
Historical population
Census	Pop.	Note	%±
1880	932		—
1900	1,832		—
1910	4,384		139.3%
1920	5,979		36.4%
1930	13,444		124.9%
1940	19,403		44.3%
1950	41,782		115.3%
1960	69,870		67.2%
1970	78,991		13.1%
1980	77,640		−1.7%
1990	85,486		10.1%
2000	92,482		8.2%
2010	97,207		5.1%
2020	105,661		8.7%
U.S. Decennial Census; 1860–1870 1880-1890; 1900 1910 1920; 1930 1940 1950; 1960 1970 1980; 1990 2000 2010; 2020

=== Racial and ethnic composition ===
San Mateo city, California – Racial and ethnic composition Note: the US Census treats Hispanic/Latino as an ethnic category. This table excludes Latinos from the racial categories and assigns them to a separate category. Hispanics/Latinos may be of any race.
Race / Ethnicity (NH = Non-Hispanic)	Pop 2000	Pop 2010	Pop 2020	% 2000	% 2010	% 2020
White alone (NH)	52,260	45,240	40,519	56.51%	46.54%	38.35%
Black or African American alone (NH)	2,273	2,099	1,696	2.46%	2.16%	1.61%
Native American or Alaska Native alone (NH)	222	140	177	0.24%	0.14%	0.17%
Asian alone (NH)	13,811	18,153	27,786	14.93%	18.67%	26.30%
Native Hawaiian or Pacific Islander alone (NH)	1,484	1,937	1,634	1.60%	1.99%	1.55%
Other race alone (NH)	342	344	914	0.37%	0.35%	0.87%
Mixed race or Multiracial (NH)	3,117	3,479	5,737	3.37%	3.58%	5.43%
Hispanic or Latino (any race)	18,973	25,815	27,198	20.52%	26.56%	25.74%
Total	92,482	97,207	105,661	100.00%	100.00%	100.00%

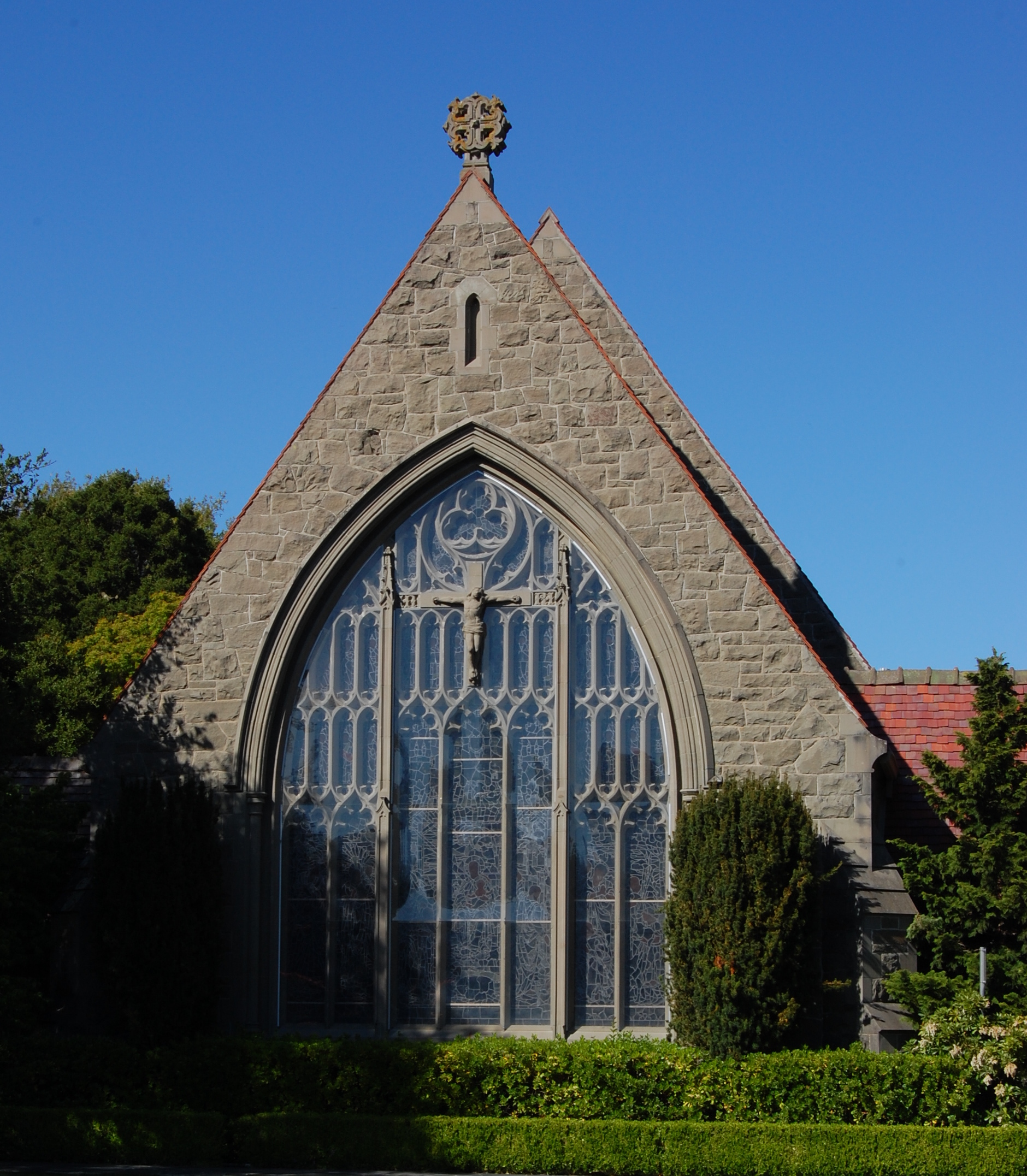
San Mateo Episcopal Church

=== 2020 census ===
The population was 105,661 at the 2020 census. The U.S. Census Bureau estimated San Mateo's population at 103,337 as of July 1, 2025. The population density was 8,707.8 inhabitants per square mile (3,362.1/km^{2}). The racial makeup of San Mateo was 41.5% White, 1.7% African American, 0.8% Native American, 26.5% Asian, 1.6% Pacific Islander, 15.2% from other races, and 12.6% from two or more races. Hispanic or Latino of any race were 25.7% of the population.

The census reported that 98.8% of the population lived in households, 1.0% lived in non-institutionalized group quarters, and 0.2% were institutionalized.

There were 40,263 households, out of which 29.9% included children under the age of 18, 49.7% were married-couple households, 7.0% were cohabiting couple households, 26.0% had a female householder with no partner present, and 17.3% had a male householder with no partner present. 26.3% of households were one person, and 11.0% were one person aged 65 or older. The average household size was 2.59. There were 25,800 families (64.1% of all households).

The age distribution was 19.8% under the age of 18, 7.1% aged 18 to 24, 33.0% aged 25 to 44, 24.6% aged 45 to 64, and 15.5% who were 65 years of age or older. The median age was 38.3 years. For every 100 females, there were 97.7 males.

There were 42,229 housing units at an average density of 3,480.2 units per square mile (1,343.7 units/km^{2}), of which 40,263 (95.3%) were occupied. Of these, 49.8% were owner-occupied, and 50.2% were occupied by renters.

In 2023, the US Census Bureau estimated that the median household income was $152,669, and the per capita income was $80,312. About 4.6% of families and 7.9% of the population were below the poverty line.

== Government ==
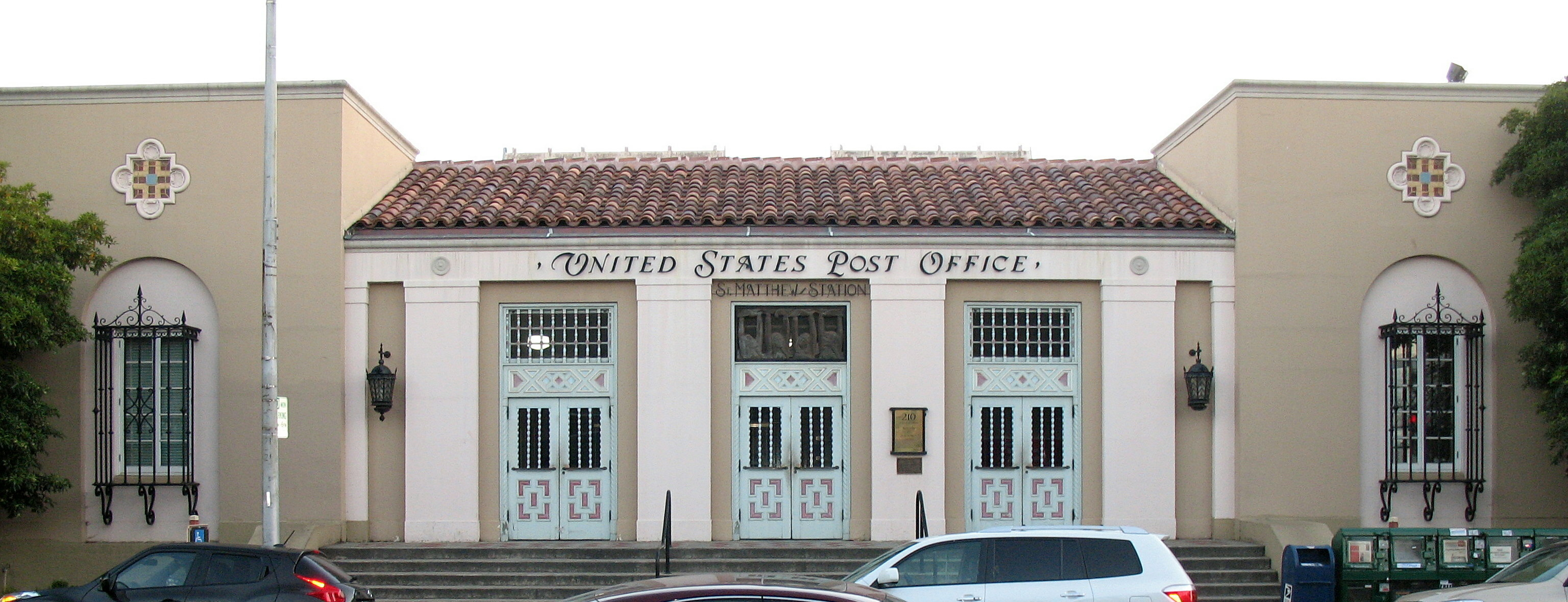
The historic Spanish Colonial Revival-style San Mateo post office

San Mateo is structured as a council–manager form of government. The city council has five members elected every two years to staggered four-year terms. In 2022, the city began the process of switching from at-large elections to district elections.

In the California State Legislature, San Mateo is in the 13th senatorial district, represented by Democrat Josh Becker, and in the 21st Assembly district, represented by Democrat Diane Papan.

In the United States House of Representatives, San Mateo is in California's 15th congressional district, represented by Democrat Kevin Mullin.

According to the California Secretary of State, as of February 10, 2019, San Mateo has 54,946 registered voters. Of those, 27,502 (50.1%) are registered Democrats, 8,504 (15.5%) are registered Republicans, and 16,772 (30.5%) have declined to state a political party.

== Economy ==
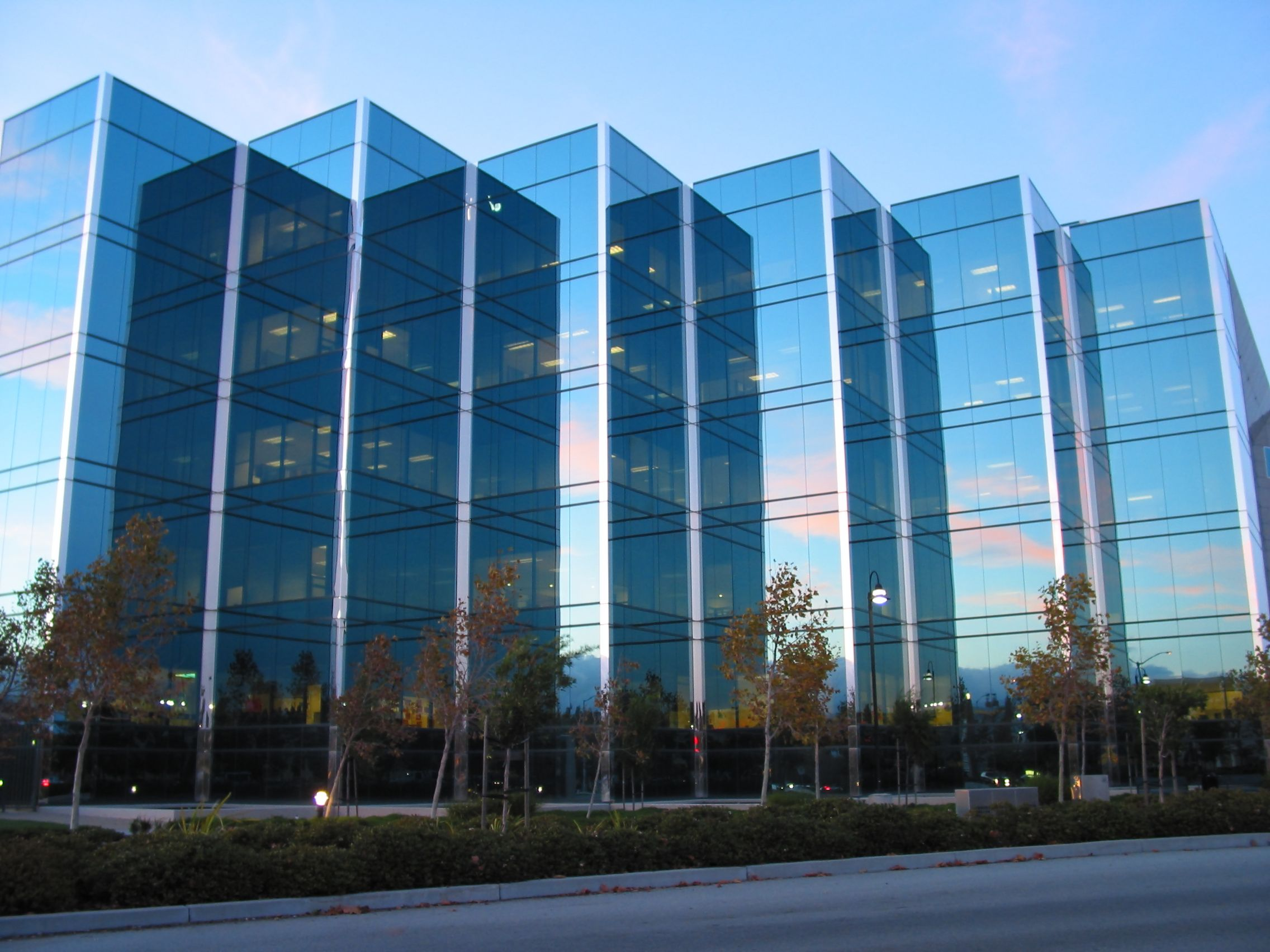
Sony Interactive Entertainment headquarters in 2004

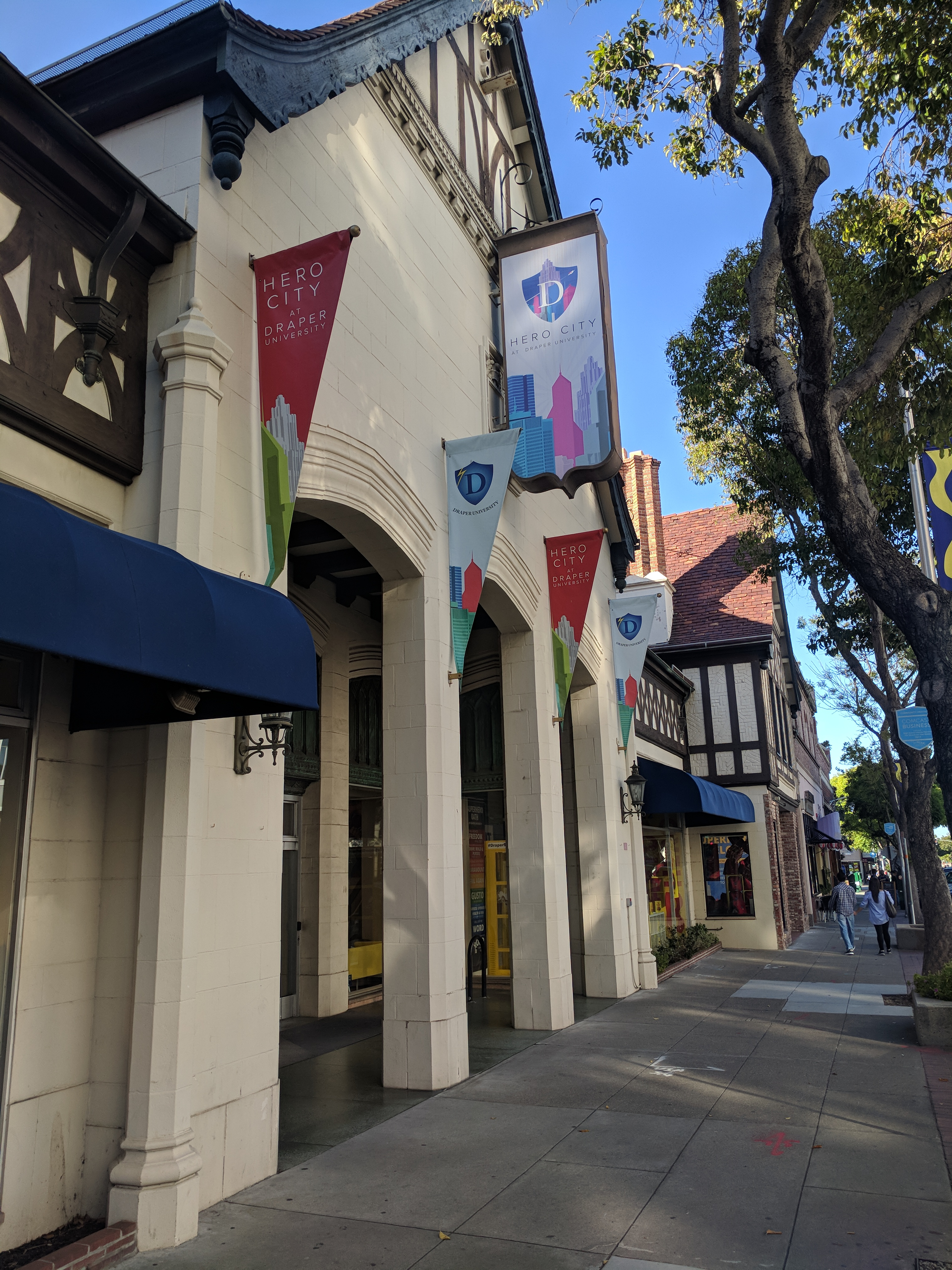
Hero City at Draper University

The economy of San Mateo is considered very diverse, with jobs in the technology, health care, financial services, government, and retail trade fields being among the most numerous. Current and former companies based in San Mateo include Sony Interactive Entertainment, NetSuite, Franklin Templeton Investments, Fisher Investments, Solstice, Guidewire Software, Coupa, Snowflake Inc., Roblox Corporation, Marketo, SurveyMonkey, Devsisters USA, Vyond, and GoPro.

Since 1990, San Mateo has had a voter-approved ordinance limiting the height of new development to 55 feet (17 m). The San Mateo housing market is one of the most expensive in the country. In February 2018, the median San Mateo home was valued at $1,463,900, and the median rent was ranked ninth in the entire nation, at $2,242 per month.

In the mid-2000s, the second stories of downtown San Mateo buildings became a hub for startup companies, including Roblox, GoPro and YouTube.

According to the city's 2022 Annual Comprehensive Financial Report, the top employers in the city are:

#	Employer	# of employees
1	County of San Mateo Medical Center	1,317
2	Sony Interactive Entertainment	1,248
3	San Mateo Union High School District	1,003
4	San Mateo-Foster City Unified	999
5	San Mateo Community College District	579
6	Franklin Templeton Investments	541
7	San Mateo County Behavioral Health	467
8	City of San Mateo	456
9	Rakuten	423
10	Mills-Peninsula Health Services	351

== Education ==
San Mateo High School

Residents are zoned for schools in the San Mateo Foster City School District and San Mateo Union High School District. Elementary schools comprise preschool, K-5, middle and magnet schools. There are several private schools, including the PreK-8 schools Saint Matthew's Episcopal Day School and the Carey school. There are three public high schools: San Mateo, Aragon, and Hillsdale. There are also two main private high schools: one all-male Catholic high school, Junípero Serra; and the Nueva Upper School.

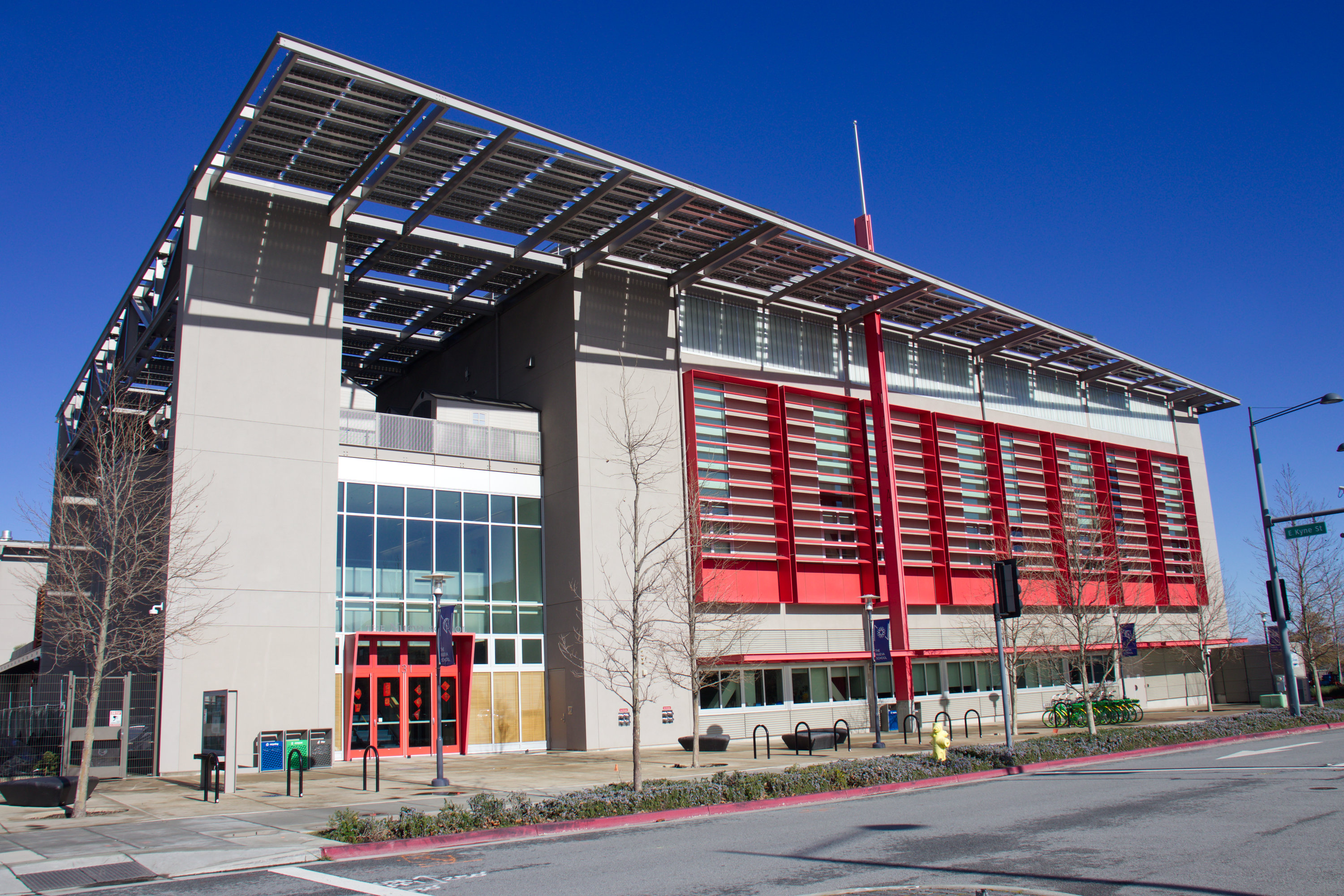
The Nueva School

The San Mateo Union High School District also hosts an adult school behind San Mateo High School. The San Mateo Performing Arts Center, one of the largest local theaters, is located on the San Mateo High School campus.

The city is home to the College of San Mateo, a community college. The campus of over 10,000 students is located on 153 acres (0.62 km^{2}) in the western foothills of the city which offer a panoramic view of the San Francisco Bay. Other universities in the area include Notre Dame de Namur University, a private Catholic university of 2,000 students in neighboring Belmont, and Stanford University located about 12 miles (19 km) to the south.

== Public libraries ==
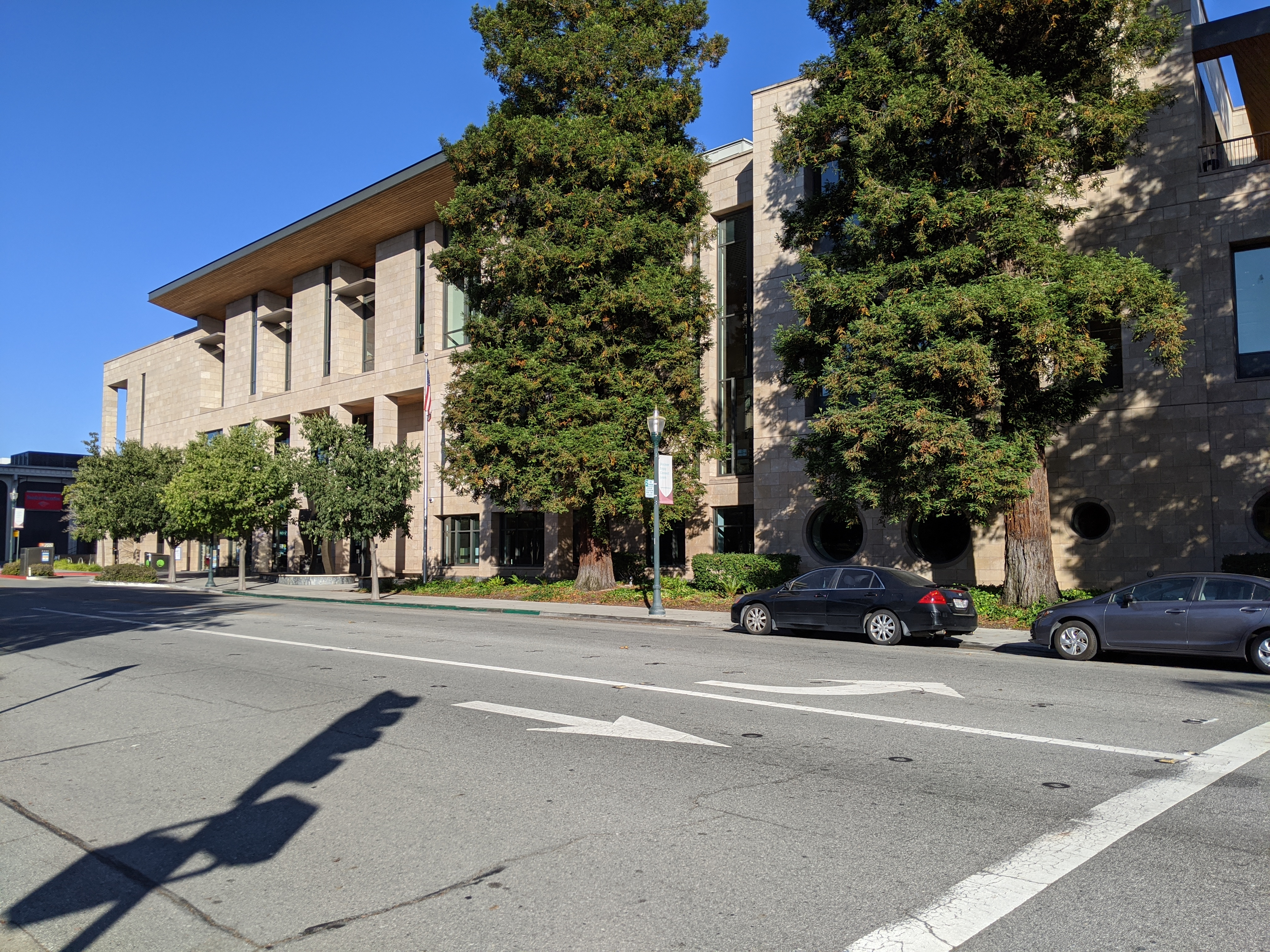
San Mateo Public Library, Main building (2020)

The City of San Mateo operates one central (Main) and two branch (Hillsdale and Marina) libraries within the city; all three are part of the Peninsula Library System.

The newest Main Library building, at 55 West 3rd Avenue near Central Park in downtown, opened in 2006 after residents passed a $35 million bond measure; the remaining funds came from state ($20 M) and private sources ($10 M). It was designed by EHDD. Upon opening, the three-story, 93,000-square-foot (8,600 m^{2}) building earned numerous design awards and was LEED-certified NC Gold. Floor-to-ceiling windows provide abundant natural light. The technologically advanced building is modeled after a retail bookstore.

The first public library in San Mateo was organized in 1883, and a building named Library Hall was completed in 1885, sharing the structure with other municipal uses. The library moved to a dedicated Carnegie library building in 1907 at 129 2nd Avenue, the northwest corner with San Mateo Drive, one year after the 1906 San Francisco earthquake damaged Library Hall. The Hillsdale and Marina branches opened in 1957 and 1966, respectively. The Carnegie building was torn down in 1969 after a new library building designed by William Garwood was dedicated on December 15, 1968 at the present-day location on 3rd. The Garwood-designed building was expanded in 1983 and was closed and demolished in 2003 to clear the land for the present building, which opened on August 27, 2006.

== Parks and recreation ==
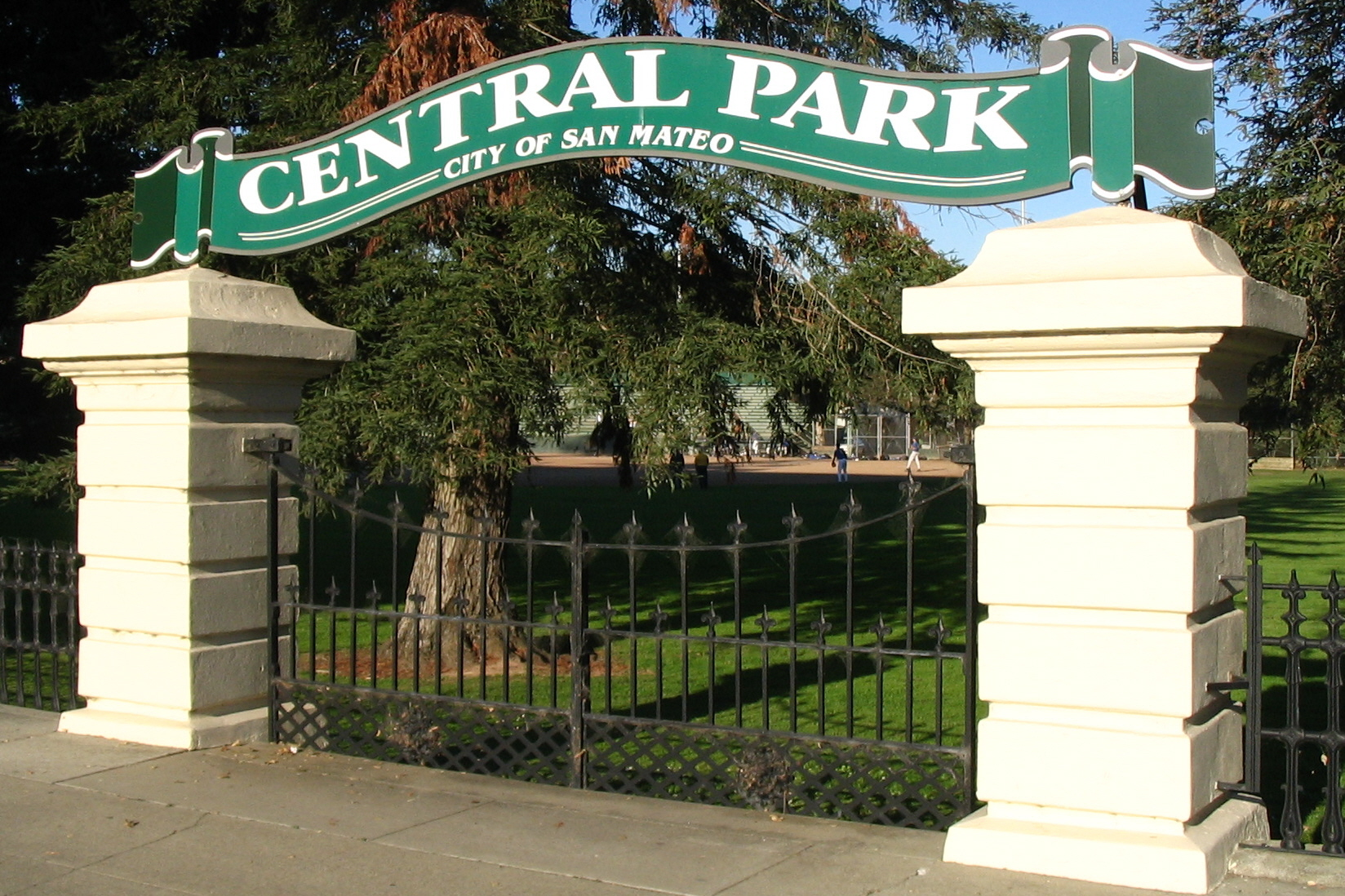
San Mateo's Central Park

San Mateo maintains more than 15 parks throughout the city. Central Park is considered to be the main one and hosts many community park functions that serve downtown residents. It has a Japanese tea garden to commemorate sister city Toyonaka, Japan. The park also features a rose garden, a mini train and the San Mateo Arboretum.

Bay Tree Park which has a 300 year old California Bay Laurel (Umbellularia californica) is located in the city's Baywood neighborhood. The park was created in 1979 after a developer wanted to build an apartment complex on the site. Local residents, including Thomas Lashbrook, raised funds to help buy the land by "selling" square foot plots. This was completed in 1973 for a purchase price of $143,000. The park was dedicated in 1979.

Beresford Park is another large park that offers bocce ball and a skate plaza. Martin Luther King Jr. Park and Joinville Park offer swimming pools, while Ryder Park boasts a water play structure. Parkside Aquatic Park, located on Seal Slough, has beach swimming and volleyball. Many of these parks have picnic areas with grills, children's play areas, basketball and tennis courts, and baseball diamonds.

Coyote Point Park, near the border with Burlingame and on the San Francisco Bay, is a 670-acre (2.7 km^{2}) regional county park known for its ideal location for windsurfing and sailing. It is also home to CuriOdyssey: a hands-on science museum and small native animal zoo.

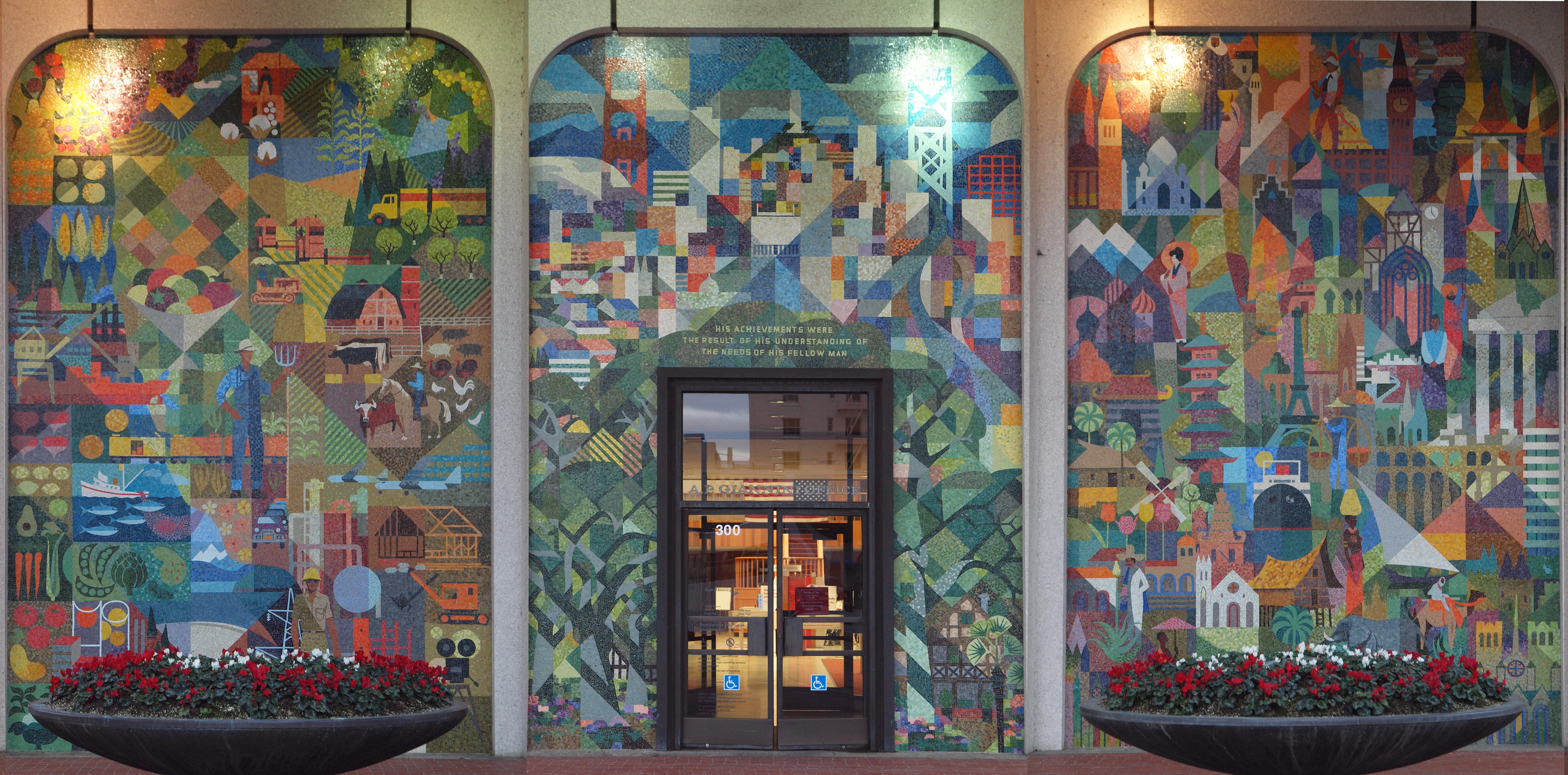
Mosaic celebrating Amadeo Giannini by Louis Macouillard and Alfonso Pardiñas, built in 1963 and installed on Bank of America downtown branch

Public art is located all around the city. One of the more memorable works is the large, brightly colored 1963 mosaic mural designed by Louis Macouillard and constructed by Alfonso Pardiñas. The mural is located in front of a mid-century-modern-style Bank of America branch at 300 S. El Camino Real and tells the story of A. P. Giannini, who founded the bank as the Bank of Italy.

== Transportation ==
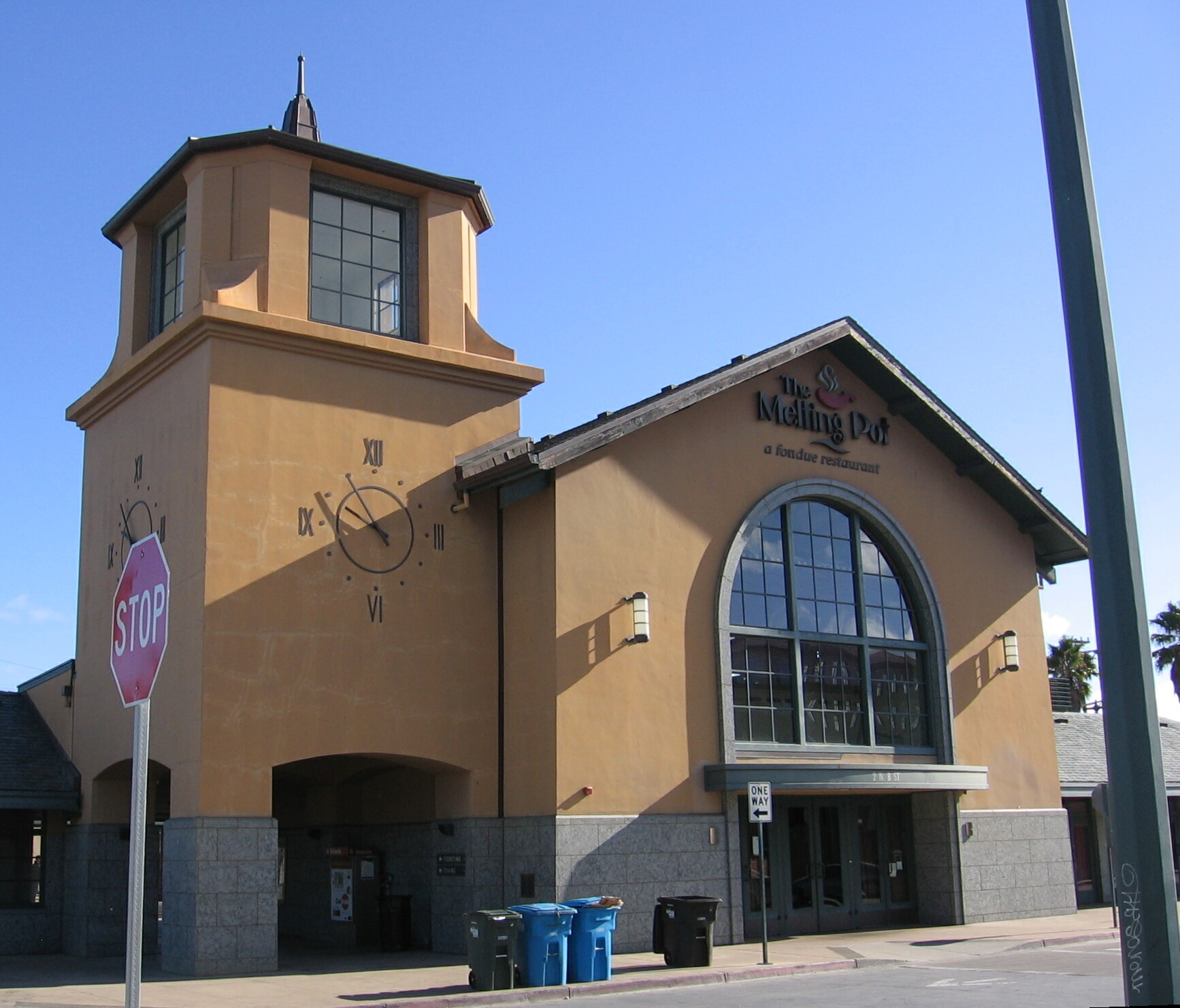
San Mateo station, served by Caltrain and SamTrans

=== Freeways ===
San Mateo is considered to be near the center of the San Francisco Bay Area about halfway between San Francisco and San Jose, the region's two largest cities. It is served by three major freeways: U.S. Route 101, Interstate 280, and State Route 92. State Route 92 east of San Mateo traverses the San Francisco Bay as the San Mateo-Hayward Bridge to the city of Hayward on its eastern shore.

=== Bicycling ===
San Mateo has a network of bikeways connecting major destinations in the city. In 2011, the city approved a Bicycle Master Plan to establish bicycling goals, identify gaps in the existing bikeway system, and create a prioritized list of infrastructure improvement projects.

=== Public transportation ===
SamTrans provides local bus service within the city of San Mateo as well as the entire county of San Mateo. AC Transit provides transbay bus service via the San Mateo Bridge to Alameda County. Caltrain provides commuter rail service on the San Francisco Peninsula between San Francisco and San Jose. Caltrain operates three stations within the city of San Mateo with stations at Hillsdale (serving the mall and surrounding area), Hayward Park (near Highway 92), and San Mateo (in downtown San Mateo). There are 41 northbound and 41 southbound trains with a stop in the city each weekday and 18 trains in both directions on weekends. Extra southbound trains are run to accommodate passengers after San Francisco Giants games. See public transportation in San Mateo County for more details.

== Media ==
- San Mateo Daily Journal – newspaper
- San Mateo County Times – newspaper
- KCSM (FM)
- KPJK

== Sister cities ==
San Mateo has two sister cities, as designated by the Sister Cities International, Inc.:

- Varde, Denmark (since November 17, 1969)
- Toyonaka, Osaka Prefecture, Japan (since October 8, 1963)

== Notable people ==
=== Actors, entertainers ===
- Lina Basquette (1907–1994), silent film actress
- Barry Bostwick (born 1945), Golden Globe Award and Tony Award-winning actor and singer, known for The Rocky Horror Picture Show (1975), Spin City
- Emma Chamberlain, internet personality
- James P. Connolly, comedian, actor, and radio/television host
- Merv Griffin (1925–2007), television personality, creator of Jeopardy! and Wheel of Fortune
- Greg Gutfeld, television personality, author
- Dennis Haysbert, actor, known for Major League, Heat, 24, The Unit, and as spokesman for Allstate Insurance
- Michael Trucco, actor

=== Artists, designers ===
- Catherine Chalmers (born 1957), artist, photographer
- Joseph Eichler, real estate developer, known for affordable mid-century modern homes
- Sam Francis (1923–1994), abstract expressionist painter
- Jack Stauffacher, book designer, graphic designer, printmaker
- Paul Terry, cartoonist, screenwriter, film director, producer and co-founder of Terrytoons

=== Business ===
- Charles W. Clark (1871–1933), copper industrialist, chairman of the United Verde Copper Company, former owner of the El Paloma estate in San Mateo
- Amadeo Giannini, founder of Bank of Italy, moved to San Mateo in 1906
- Umang Gupta (1949–2022), former CEO of Keynote Systems; wrote the original business plan for Oracle Corporation
- William Kohl (1820–1893), a founding partner of the Alaska Commercial Company; California pioneer; his former estate is now San Mateo's Central Park

=== Musicians ===
- Kris Kristofferson (1936–2024), singer-songwriter
- Merl Saunders (1934–2008), keyboardist
- Neal Schon (born 1954), musician, attended Aragon High School
- Cal Tjader, jazz musician
- Pegi Young (1952–2019) singer, songwriter, environmentalist, educator and philanthropist, born in San Mateo

=== Politics ===
- Jane Baker (1923–2011), first female mayor of San Mateo, and city councilwoman 1973–1993
- Chris Eachus (born 1955), member of the New York State Assembly
- Zoe Lofgren (born 1947), U.S. representative for California
- Andrea Salinas (born 1969), U.S. representative for Oregon

=== Sports ===
- Michael Allen (born 1959), professional golfer
- David Binn (born 1972), 18-season NFL player
- Tom Brady (born 1977), NFL quarterback, 7-time Super Bowl champion and 5-time Super Bowl MVP who played 20 seasons with the New England Patriots and three seasons with the Tampa Bay Buccaneers; born in San Mateo
- Pat Hennen (born 1953), former professional motorcycle racer, first American to win a World Championship Grand Prix road race (1976 500cc Finnish Grand Prix)
- Ann Kiyomura, tennis player, Wimbledon doubles champion
- Daniel Naroditsky, chess grandmaster, author, and streamer
- Sean Payton (born 1963), former head coach of the New Orleans Saints and current head coach of the Denver Broncos
- Jake Scheiner (born 1995), player for the Hiroshima Toyo Carp of Nippon Professional Baseball
- Kendal Smith, former NFL player
- Lynn Swann (born 1952), Serra student, former NFL wide receiver for the Pittsburgh Steelers, four-time Super Bowl champion
- Sam Tuivailala (born in San Mateo, 1992), former MLB pitcher
- John Wetteland, former MLB pitcher

=== Writers, poets, journalists ===
- Kenneth Fisher, Forbes columnist, financial author, money manager
- J. Kenji López-Alt, chef, food writer, author of The Food Lab
- Lee Mallory, poet, editor, retired professor
- John Matteson, Pulitzer Prize-winning biographer
- Bill Pronzini, prolific author of detective fiction; lived in San Mateo in the 60s before his writing career began

=== Other ===
- James Lanza, Sicilian-born mobster, boss of the San Francisco crime family
- Mark Macdonald, health and fitness influencer
- Susumu Tonegawa (1939–2026), Nobel prizewinning geneticist

== See also ==
- San Mateo County History Museum
