= San Mateo Arboretum =

Arboretum in San Mateo, California

Coordinates: 37°33′39″N 122°19′16″W

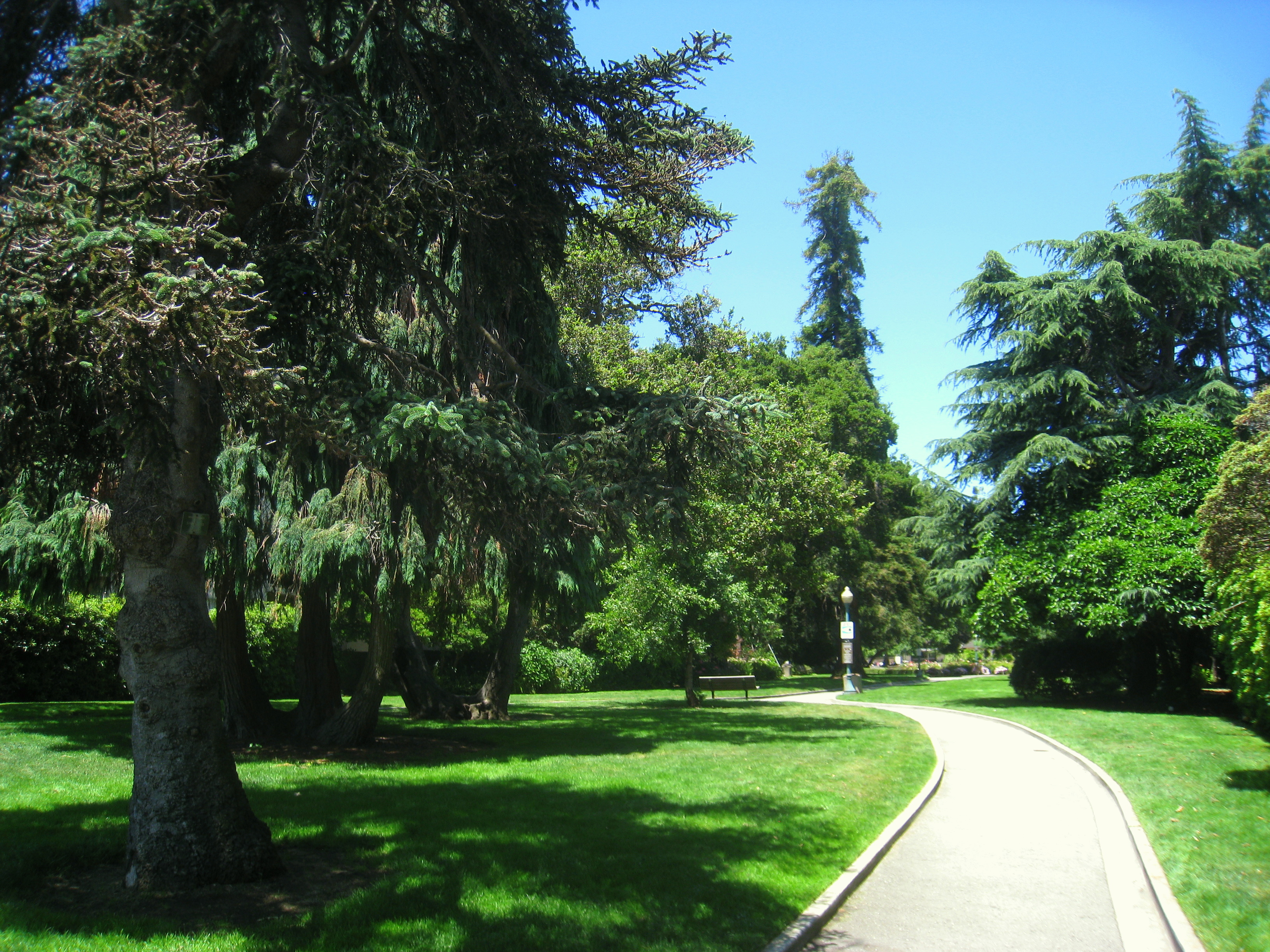
One of the paths in the arboretum.

The San Mateo Arboretum is an arboretum in San Mateo, California containing old stands of pine, oak, cedar, and redwood planted over 100 years ago on the William Kohl property by John McLaren. The Arboretum is located in San Mateo's Central Park, which also houses the San Mateo Arboretum Society near the Kohl Pump House area of the park.

The San Mateo Arboretum Society is a volunteer run, nonprofit, founded in 1975 by Marion Panaretos. They host horticultural-themed events and classes, as well as working on the rose garden, the plant nurseries and the native plant garden within the park. The gardens, particularly the rose garden is popular for weddings.

Within Central Park there is a Japanese tea garden designed by Nagao Sakurai, that was dedicated in 1966. This garden contains cherry trees, Japanese maples and bonsai and marks the sister-city relationship between San Mateo and Toyonaka, Japan.

== See also ==
- List of botanical gardens in the United States
- List of botanical gardens and arboretums in California
