= William Kohl =

William H. Kohl (1820–1893) was a sea captain, shipowner, shipbuilder, and a founding partner of the Alaska Commercial Company.

== Biography ==
A Victoria shipbuilder, he was of Pennsylvania Dutch heritage and a California 49er. An engineer by training, he was also a trader, having made a fortune in Alaska in the fur seal business. His San Mateo, California estate was landscaped by John McLaren. It is now the city's Central Park and houses the San Mateo Arboretum. His mansion, situated near the corner of Fifth and Laurel, served as the first location for the College of San Mateo. He was the father of Charles Frederick Kohl who built Kohl Mansion in Burlingame, California, which has become Mercy High School.
