= Mark Macdonald =

American diet, fitness and health expert

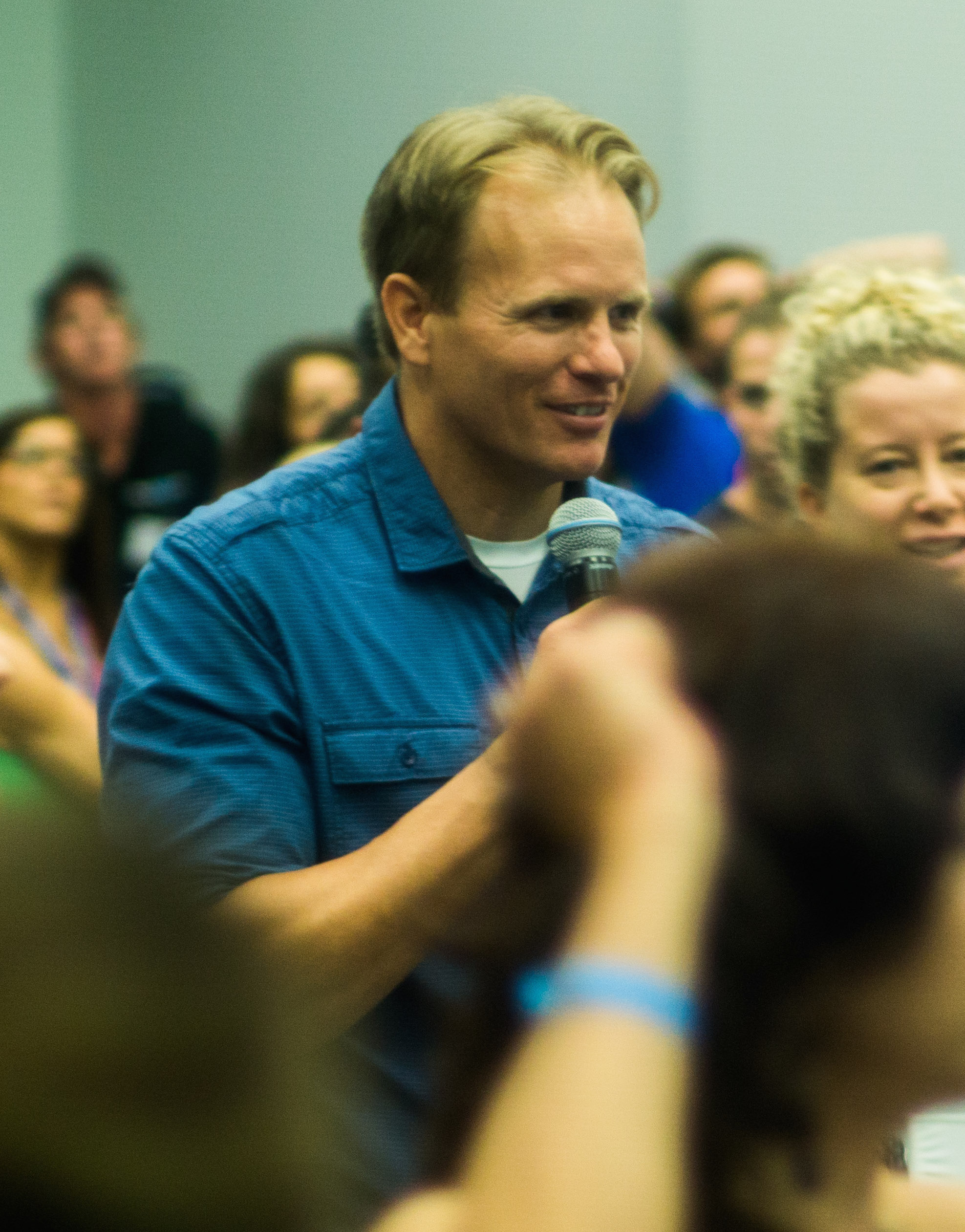
- Macdonald walks through the crowd as he speaks at IDEA world, 2014
- Born: June 29, 1972 (age 54); San Mateo, California
- Occupations: Nutritionist & Kinesiologist
- Spouse: Abbi
- Children: Hunter and Hope
- Website: www.markmacdonald.tv

Mark Michael Macdonald (born June 29, 1972) is an American diet, nutrition, fitness & health expert, television star, global instructor and speaker and the author of the New York Times bestselling book Body Confidence. He is also the founder of Venice Nutrition.

== Career ==
Mark is the founder of Venice Nutrition and the IBNFC (International Board of Nutrition and Fitness Coaching), author of the New York Times Bestseller Body Confidence

Venice Nutrition began in 1999 as a nutrition coaching center in Venice Beach, California for general weight loss and muscle toning programs for fitness professionals. In 2003 it developed a national nutrition certification program and in 2006 created an online nutrition program. It provides health and nutrition information through radio, TV and news articles. Venice Nutrition has a nutrition certification program and a licensing system that allows health and fitness practices to build a system of nutrition centers that can train and instruct their clients how to live the Venice Nutrition program. Venice Nutrition has certified coaches around the world and has more than 500 Venice Nutrition partners globally. Mark launched the 8 Week Run weight loss and nutrition program in 2014 featured on the HLN series 8 Weeks New Body New Life, which will also be featured in his upcoming book published by HarperCollins entitled Why Kids Make You Fat and How to Get Your Body Back, which is scheduled for release on April 28, 2015.

Mark has several partnerships with different fitness organizations including IDEA, the American Diabetes Association and the International Speakers Bureau.

=== Media ===
Mark came to public prominence through his being featured as a health expert on various television shows, including The Dr. Oz Show, CNN, Access Hollywood Chelsey Lately, and HLN.

Mark is currently the host of the HLN news segment Transformation Tuesdays.
