= Mark McDonald (hurler) =

Irish hurler (1888–1952)

Personal information
- Native name: Marc Mac Dómhnaill (Irish)
- Born: 9 August 1888 Fiddown, County Kilkenny, Ireland
- Died: 16 February 1952 (aged 63) Waterford, Ireland
- Occupation: Farmer

Sport
- Sport: Hurling
- Position: Goalkeeper
Club
- Years: Club
- 1907-1925: Mooncoin
Club titles
- Kilkenny titles: 1
Inter-county
- Years: County
- 1921-1924: Kilkenny
Inter-county titles
- Leinster titles: 2
- All-Irelands: 1

Mark McDonald (9 August 1888 – 16 February 1952) was an Irish hurler. Usually lining out as a goalkeeper, he was a member of the Kilkenny team that won the 1922 All-Ireland Championship.

McDonald enjoyed a club career with Mooncoin that spanned three decades. He won his sole county championship medal in 1908.

After being selected for the Kilkenny senior team in 1921, he held his position on the team for the following four championship seasons. He won his first Leinster medal in 1922 before later winning his sole All-Ireland medal after Kilkenny's defeat of Tipperary in the final. McDonald won a second Leinster medal in 1923.

McDonald was married to Esther (née Howley) and had seven children. He died after a short period of ill health on 16 February 1952.

== Honours ==
Mooncoin

- Kilkenny Senior Hurling Championship (1): 1908

Kilkenny

- All-Ireland Senior Hurling Championship (1): 1922
- Leinster Senior Hurling Championship (2): 1922, 1923
