= Blue Cloud Ventures =

American venture capital firm

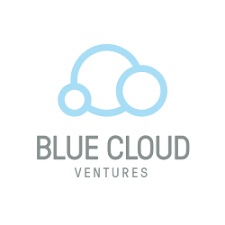
- Company type: Private Company
- Industry: Venture Capital
- Founded: 2012; 14 years ago
- Founder: Mir Arif, Rami Rahal, Joel Lou
- Headquarters: New York City
- Products: Venture capital, growth capital
- Website: www.bluecloudventures.com

Blue Cloud Ventures is a New York-based venture capital fund investing in growth stage software-as-a-service companies. Co-founded in 2012 by Rami Rahal, Mir Arif and Joel Lou, its fund focuses primarily on late-stage cloud software companies with annual revenue between $10 and $50 million that are expected to reach an exit within three to five years. Blue Cloud has invested in Vidyo, Tapad, CloudBees, and Lattice Engines.

== See also ==
- Private equity
