= Matt Dickerson =

American football player (born 1995)

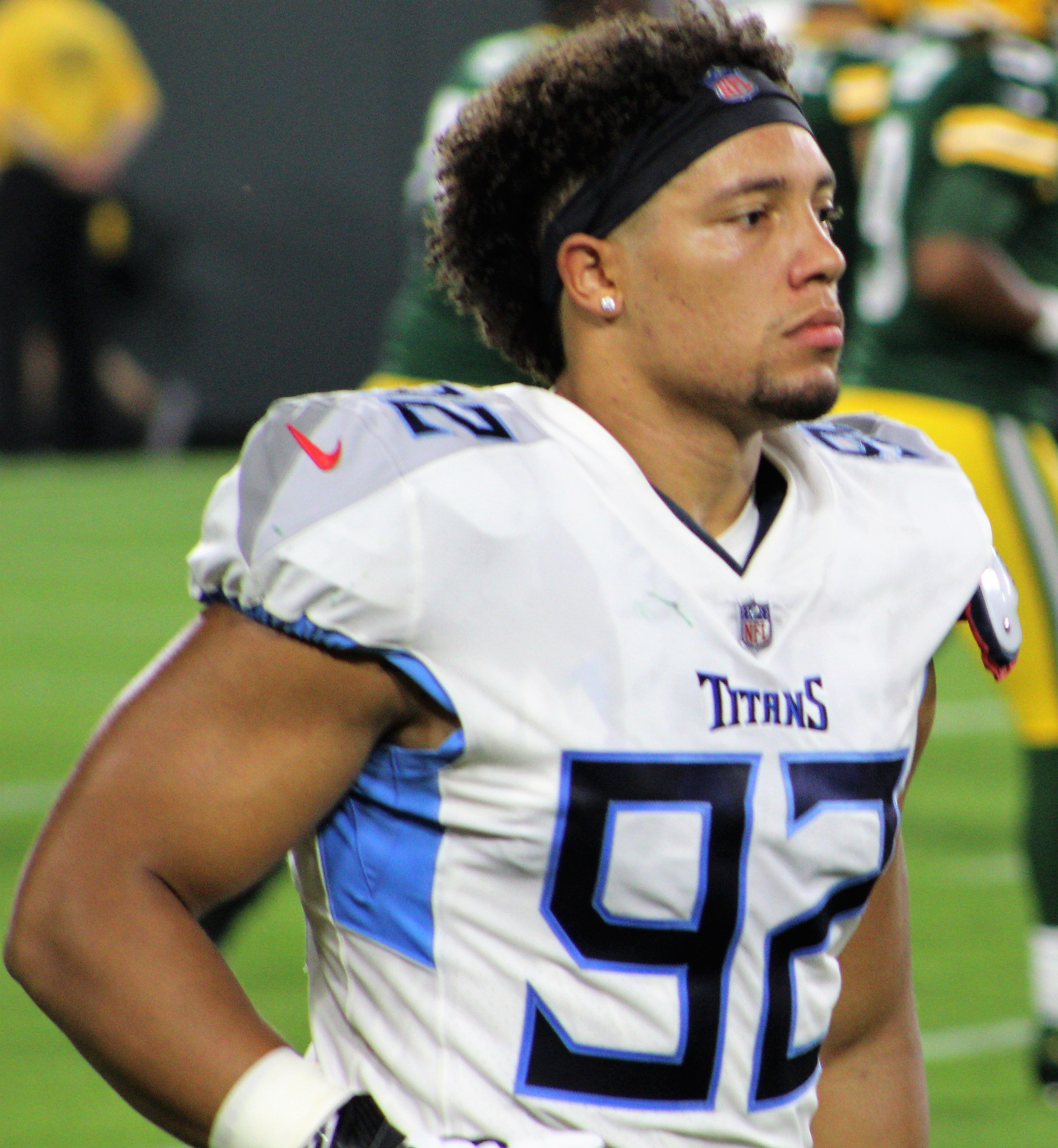
- Dickerson with the Tennessee Titans in 2018

No. 93 – Jacksonville Jaguars
- Position: Defensive end
- Roster status: Active

Personal information
- Born: November 9, 1995 (age 30); San Francisco, California, U.S.
- Listed height: 6 ft 5 in (1.96 m)
- Listed weight: 300 lb (136 kg)

Career information
- High school: Junípero Serra (San Mateo, California)
- College: UCLA (2014–2017)
- NFL draft: 2018: undrafted

Career history
- Tennessee Titans (2018–2020); Las Vegas Raiders (2021)*; Arizona Cardinals (2021–2022)*; Kansas City Chiefs (2022)*; Atlanta Falcons (2022); Kansas City Chiefs (2023); Miami Dolphins (2024); Jacksonville Jaguars (2025–present)
- * Offseason or practice squad member only

Awards and highlights
- Super Bowl champion (LVIII)

Career NFL statistics as of 2025
- Total tackles: 52
- Pass deflections: 1
- Stats at Pro Football Reference

Matthew Miller Dickerson (born November 9, 1995) is an American professional football defensive end for the Jacksonville Jaguars of the National Football League (NFL). He played college football for the UCLA Bruins. He has also played for the Tennessee Titans and Las Vegas Raiders.

== Early life ==
Matthew Miller Dickerson was born on November 9, 1995, in San Francisco, California, to Pamela and Clarence Dickerson. Matt Dickerson grew up in San Mateo, California, and attended Junípero Serra High School, where he excelled in football and basketball.

As a freshman on the football team, he led the Padres to an undefeated championship season in the WCAL. He was also named Most Valuable Player of his freshman basketball team.

As a sophomore on the football team, he started the season on the varsity team before being sent down to the junior varsity team. He was recalled to the varsity team for the CIF Central Coast Section playoffs in football and called up in basketball as well. The Padres had not won a CCS Championship in football since 1990. On December 3, 2011, at Terra Nova High School, in a 42–21 win over the Menlo-Atherton Bears, the Padres won their second CCS Championship and first at the Division One level.

As a junior on the football team, he was named All-WCAL Honorable Mention as a defensive lineman and tight end. As a junior on the basketball team, the Padres reached the WCAL and CCS Championship Finals against the Archbishop Mitty Monarchs who were led by All-American Aaron Gordon. On February 16, 2013, at Foothill College, Dickerson guarded Gordon in the WCAL Championship Final. In the first quarter, Gordon drove to the basket and was fouled on the way up and wound up on top of Dickerson. Gordon wrapped his arms around Dickerson's neck and then proceeded to stand up immediately with players on the court from both teams playing peace makers. They would both receive technical fouls and Dickerson was suspended.

Before Dickerson's senior football season, he was named a USA Today High School All-American as well as the number six rated prospect coming out of the San Francisco Bay Area. Dickerson studied precalculus under Serra Hall of Famer Joe Kmak. Dickerson would miss his entire senior season due to a back injury. Despite missing his senior season, the Padres would be named co-champions of the WCAL with Archbishop Mitty and would go on to defeat the Monarchs in the CCS Championship Final to win their first Sectional Open Division Championship in any sport and at any level. He was teammates in football and basketball with future NFL player Easop Winston.

== College career ==
Dickerson appeared in 44 games (16 starts) for the Bruins over four seasons. Over the course of his career he recorded totaled 97 tackles, seven tackles for loss, four passes defensed and 1.5 sacks. Dickerson's senior season was cut short after a severe injury to his collarbone.

== Professional career ==
Pre-draft measurables
Height	Weight	Arm length	Hand span	Wingspan	40-yard dash	10-yard split	20-yard split	20-yard shuttle	Three-cone drill	Vertical jump	Bench press
6 ft 4 5/8 in (1.95 m)	292 lb (132 kg)	33 1/4 in (0.84 m)	10 in (0.25 m)	6 ft 7 in (2.01 m)	5.06 s	1.81 s	3.00 s	4.67 s	7.56 s	31.0 in (0.79 m)	26 reps
All values from NFL Scouting Combine/Pro Day

=== Tennessee Titans ===
Dickerson signed by the Tennessee Titans as an undrafted free agent on May 11, 2018. He made his NFL debut on September 23, in a 9–6 win against the Jacksonville Jaguars. As a rookie, Dickerson played in three games with three tackles.

On October 19, 2019, Dickerson was waived by the Titans. He was re-signed by Tennessee on October 22. He was waived again on October 26, but re-signed two days later.

In the Wild Card round of the 2020 playoffs against the Baltimore Ravens, Dickerson recorded his first career sack on Lamar Jackson during the 20–13 loss.

=== Las Vegas Raiders ===
Dickerson signed with the Las Vegas Raiders on March 22, 2021. He was waived by the Raiders as part of final roster cuts on August 31.

=== Arizona Cardinals ===
On November 2, 2021, Dickerson was signed to the practice squad of the Arizona Cardinals. He was released on November 15. He was re-signed on December 27. He signed a reserve/future contract with the Cardinals on January 19, 2022. He was released by Arizona on July 29.

=== Kansas City Chiefs ===
On August 8, 2022, Dickerson signed with the Kansas City Chiefs. He was waived by Kansas City on August 30.

=== Atlanta Falcons ===
On August 31, 2022, Dickerson was claimed off waivers by the Atlanta Falcons.

=== Kansas City Chiefs (second stint) ===
On May 10, 2023, Dickerson signed with the Chiefs. He was released on August 30, and re-signed to the practice squad. He was promoted to the active roster on September 27. Dickerson was then waived on December 30 and re-signed to the practice squad three days later.

On January 28 at M&T Bank Stadium, in a 17–10 win over the Baltimore Ravens, the Chiefs won the AFC Championship, advancing to the Super Bowl.

On February 11 at Allegiant Stadium, in a 25–22 overtime win over the NFC champion San Francisco 49ers, the Chiefs won Super Bowl LVIII. The win over his hometown team gave Dickerson a Super Bowl ring. On February 14, 2024, Dickerson signed a reserve/futures contract with the Chiefs.

Dickerson was waived by the Chiefs on August 27, 2024, and re-signed to the practice squad, but released two days later.

=== Miami Dolphins ===
On October 25, 2024, Dickerson was signed to the Miami Dolphins' practice squad. He was promoted to the active roster on December 14.

On August 26, 2025, Dickerson was released by the Dolphins as part of final roster cuts.

=== Jacksonville Jaguars ===
Dickerson was signed to the Jacksonville Jaguars' practice squad on August 28, 2025. He was promoted to the active roster on December 2. Dickerson made eight appearances (four starts) for Jacksonville, recording one pass deflection and 10 combined tackles.

On February 16, 2026, Dickerson re-signed with the Jaguars.

== Personal life ==
Dickerson has a twin sister named Megan and enjoys fishing and golfing.
