= Easop Winston =

American gridiron football player (born 1996)

No. 84 – Columbus Aviators
- Position: Wide receiver
- Roster status: Active

Personal information
- Born: December 17, 1996 (age 29); San Francisco, California, U.S.
- Listed height: 5 ft 11 in (1.80 m)
- Listed weight: 192 lb (87 kg)

Career information
- High school: Junípero Serra (San Mateo, California)
- College: City College of San Francisco (2014–2016); Washington State (2017–2019)
- NFL draft: 2020: undrafted

Career history
- Los Angeles Rams (2020)*; New Orleans Saints (2021); Cleveland Browns (2022)*; Seattle Seahawks (2022–2023); New York Jets (2024)*; Ottawa Redblacks (2025)*; Columbus Aviators (2026–present)
- * Offseason or practice squad member only

Career NFL statistics as of 2023
- Receptions: 1
- Receiving yards: 5
- Return yards: 119
- Stats at Pro Football Reference

Easop Winston Jr. (born December 17, 1996) is an American professional football wide receiver for the Columbus Aviators of the United Football League (UFL). He played college football for the Washington State Cougars. He was selected by the Columbus Aviators during the 2026 UFL free agent draft.

== Early life ==
Easop Winston Jr. was born on December 17, 1996, to Easop Winston Sr. and Renee Winston. He grew up In South San Francisco, California and attended Junípero Serra High School in San Mateo, California, where he played football, basketball, and ran track and field. His senior year, the Padres would be named co-champions of the WCAL with Archbishop Mitty Monarchs and would go on to defeat the Monarchs in the CCS Championship Final to win their first Sectional Open Division Championship in any sport and at any level. He was teammates in football and basketball with NFL player Matt Dickerson.

== College career ==
Winston began his collegiate career at the City College of San Francisco. He grayshirted his first year after enrolling and had 62 receptions for 986 yards and 12 touchdowns the following season. As a sophomore, Winston caught 71 passes for 1,171 yards and 12 touchdowns. Winston committed to play at Washington State for his remaining eligibility over an offer from Eastern Michigan.

Winston redshirted his first season with the Washington State Cougars. As a redshirt junior, he played the "Z" receiver position and had 52 receptions for 654 yards and eight touchdowns. Winston caught 85 passes for 970 yards with 11 touchdowns as a redshirt senior.

== Professional career ==
Pre-draft measurables
Height	Weight
5 ft 10 5/8 in (1.79 m)	192 lb (87 kg)
Values from Pro Day

=== Los Angeles Rams ===
Winston signed with the Los Angeles Rams as an undrafted free agent on April 25, 2020. He was waived by the Rams during final roster cuts on September 4.

=== New Orleans Saints ===
Winston was signed by the New Orleans Saints on May 6, 2021. He was waived on August 31, during final roster cuts and was re-signed to the practice squad the next day. Winston was elevated to the active roster on December 12, for the team's Week 14 game against the New York Jets. He signed a reserve/future contract with the Saints on January 11, 2022.

On August 15, 2022, Winston was waived by the Saints.

=== Cleveland Browns ===
Winston was claimed off waivers by the Cleveland Browns on August 16, 2022. He was waived by the Browns on August 30.

=== Seattle Seahawks ===
On October 19, 2022, Winston was signed to the Seattle Seahawks practice squad. He signed a reserve/future contract on January 17, 2023.

On August 29, 2023, Winston was waived by the Seahawks and re-signed to the practice squad. He signed a reserve/future contract on January 8, 2024.

Winston was waived by the Seahawks on August 27, 2024 and re-signed to the practice squad, but was released a few days later.

=== New York Jets ===
On November 26, 2024, Winston was signed to the New York Jets practice squad. He signed a reserve/future contract on January 6, 2025.

On May 8, 2025, Winston was waived by the Jets.

=== Ottawa Redblacks ===
On July 9, 2025, it was announced that Winston had signed with the Ottawa Redblacks to the team's practice roster. He was released on August 31.

=== Columbus Aviators ===
On January 14, 2026, Winston was selected by the Columbus Aviators of the United Football League (UFL). He was released during training camp and re-signed on May 5.
