= Donald Haderle =

American computer scientist

Donald James Haderle is an American computer scientist and IBM Fellow, best known for his work on relational database management systems (RDBMS). He led the architecture and design of DB2, one of the first commercial RDBMSs, which led to his moniker "Father of DB2." DB2 debuted on IBM's mainframe system MVS in 1983 and validated the applicability of relational databases for high performance transaction processing. With DB2 enterprises store, retrieve, and analyze their business transaction data. The cited reference describes the early technology hurdles, the shift from a monolithic architecture to a distributed architecture portable across many operating systems (Unix, Windows, OS/2, and others) and the technology collaborations with IBM Research. DB2 is used in most enterprises around the world.

Haderle was appointed IBM Fellow in 1989. He was also elected a member of the National Academy of Engineering in 2008 for contributions to the management of high-performance relational databases and leadership in founding the relational database-management industry. Before his retirement from IBM in 2005, he was vice president and chief technology officer for information management. He is a fellow of the Association for Computing Machinery (2000).

On February 23, 2008, Haderle joined Boardwalktech (company) as a Technology advisor.

In November 2010, Haderle joined Aerospike, a company working on a NoSQL Database called Aerospike as Technology Advisor. This relationship was formally announced in August 2012.

On March 26, 2013, Haderle joined ParStream (company), a company working on a real-time SQL columnar Database for big data analytics called ParStream database as a Technology advisor.

== Life and career ==
Haderle was born on Feb. 5, 1944 and raised in San Francisco, California. He studied at Archbishop Riordan High School and received a B.A. degree in economics from the University of California Berkeley in 1967. He worked at the Port of New York Authority in New York, New York for a year and then joined IBM in San Jose, California as a computer programmer in 1968. He was appointed IBM Fellow in 1989 and Chief Technology Officer for Database Management in 1991. He retired in 2005.
