= Aerospike =

Aerospike may refer to:

- Aerospike engine, a rocket engine without a traditional rocket nozzle
- Drag-reducing aerospike, a device which reduces drag on missiles by creating a detached shock above the missile
- Aerospike cone, a jet engine exhaust cone
- Aerospike (database), an open-source noSQL database
  - Aerospike (company), a technology company based in Mountain View, California, US
