= West Catholic Athletic League =

High school athletic conference

The West Catholic Athletic League (WCAL) is a high school athletic conference in the Central Coast Section of the California Interscholastic Federation. The boys division is made up of seven Catholic schools and one nondenominational Christian school in the Western and Southern portions of the San Francisco Bay Area. The girls division includes all of the co-ed schools in the WCAL, along with Presentation High School (all-female school). Notre Dame-Belmont (all-female school), Sacred Heart Preparatory-Atherton, and the Menlo School compete in select WCAL sports (water polo and lacrosse), but mainly partake in the West Bay Athletic League.

== Member schools ==
Institution	Location	Colors	Established	Enrollment	Gender	Team name	Joined
Archbishop Mitty High School	San Jose		1964	1,750	Coed	Monarchs	
Archbishop Riordan High School	San Francisco		1949	1,200	Coed	Crusaders	
Bellarmine College Preparatory	San Jose		1851	1,625	Male	Bells	
Presentation High School	San Jose		1962	800	Female	Panthers	
Sacred Heart Cathedral Preparatory	San Francisco		1852	1,300	Coed	Fightin' Irish	1967
Saint Francis High School	Mountain View		1955	1,750	Coed	Lancers	
St. Ignatius College Preparatory	San Francisco		1855	1,507	Coed	Wildcats	1967
Junípero Serra High School	San Mateo		1944	1,000	Male	Padres	
Valley Christian High School	San Jose		1956	1,400	Coed	Warriors	2003

== Rivalries ==
- Archbishop Mitty with Saint Francis
- Archbishop Mitty with Bellarmine
- Sacred Heart Cathedral with Archbishop Riordan (Football)
- Saint Francis with Bellarmine (The Holy War)
- St. Ignatius with Sacred Heart Cathedral (see the Bruce–Mahoney Trophy).
- Junipero Serra with Saint Ignatius (Basketball)
- Junipero Serra with Saint Ignatius (Rowing – Kahle Cup)
- Junipero Serra with Saint Francis (Football and Baseball)
- Valley Christian with Archbishop Mitty
- Archbishop Mitty with Archbishop Riordan (Basketball)
- St. Ignatius with Archbishop Riordan (Football – Gil Haskell Trophy)

== Notable alumni ==
=== Major League Baseball (MLB) ===
- Barry Bonds, outfielder (Junípero Serra High School)
- Pat Burrell, outfielder (Bellarmine College Preparatory)
- Eric Byrnes, outfielder (St. Francis High School)
- Dolph Camilli, first baseman (Sacred Heart Cathedral Preparatory)
- Mark Canha, outfielder, Oakland Athletics (Bellarmine College Preparatory)
- Joe Cronin, shortstop (Sacred Heart Cathedral Preparatory)
- Tim Cullen, infielder Atlanta Braves (Junipero Serra High School)
- Kevin Frandsen, third baseman, Philadelphia Phillies (Bellarmine College Preparatory)
- Jim Fregosi, infielder/manager (Junípero Serra High School)
- Mitch Haniger, outfielder, San Francisco Giants (Archbishop Mitty High School)
- Harry Heilmann, outfielder (Sacred Heart Cathedral Preparatory)
- Gregg Jefferies, infielder/outfielder (Junípero Serra High School)
- Matt Klein, outfielder, San Francisco Giants (St. Francis High School)
- Joe Kmak, catcher (Junípero Serra High School)
- Tommy Medica, first baseman, Miami Marlins (Bellarmine College Preparatory)
- Daniel Nava, outfielder, Boston Red Sox (Saint Francis High School)
- Tony Renda, second baseman, Arizona Diamondbacks (Junipero Serra High School)
- Mike Vail, infielder/outfielder (Archbishop Mitty High School)

=== National Basketball Association (NBA) ===
- Aaron Gordon, forward (Archbishop Mitty High School)
- Tyler Johnson (basketball), guard (Saint Francis High School)
- Chris Munk, power forward (Archbishop Riordan High School)
- Kevin Restani, power forward (Archbishop Riordan High School)
- Raymond Townsend, point guard (Archbishop Mitty High School)

=== National Football League (NFL) ===
- David Bakhtiari, offensive tackle, Green Bay Packers (Junípero Serra High School)
- Tom Brady, quarterback, New England Patriots and Tampa Bay Buccaneers (Junípero Serra High School)
- Matt Dickerson, defensive end, Tennessee Titans (Junípero Serra High School)
- Rhett Ellison, tight end, Minnesota Vikings (Saint Francis High School)
- Dan Fouts, quarterback San Diego Chargers (Saint Ignatius College Preparatory)
- Jesse Freitas, quarterback, San Diego Chargers (Junípero Serra High School)
- Kevin Gogan, guard (Sacred Heart Cathedral Preparatory)
- Jason Hill, wide receiver, New York Jets (Sacred Heart Cathedral Preparatory)
- Derek Loville, running back (Archbishop Riordan High School)
- Igor Olshansky, defensive lineman (Saint Ignatius College Preparatory)
- Dan Pastorini, quarterback (Bellarmine College Preparatory)
- Steve Sewell, running back (Archbishop Riordan High School)
- Lynn Swann, wide receiver Pittsburgh Steelers (Junípero Serra High School)
- Will Ta'ufo'ou, fullback, Jacksonville Jaguars (Saint Francis High School)
- Eric Wright, cornerback, San Francisco 49ers (Archbishop Riordan High School)

=== Olympic athletes ===
- Brandi Chastain, Olympic gold medalist and Women's World Cup champion soccer player, Archbishop Mitty High School
- Polina Edmunds, figure skater, Archbishop Mitty High School
- Ariel Hsing, Table Tennis, Valley Christian High School
- Tom McBreen, U.S. Olympic swimming gold and bronze medal winner, Junipero Serra High School
- Kevin McMahon, hammer throw, Bellarmine College Preparatory
- Pablo Morales, Olympic gold and silver medalist of the 1984 and 1992 Summer Games, Pan Pacific gold and bronze medalist in '85, '87, and '89, World Champion in '86, and a silver in the Pan American Games of '83, Bellarmine College Preparatory
- Shannon Rowbury, Track and Field, Olympic Profile: 2008: 7th in the 1500; 2012: 4th in the 1500; 2016: 4th in the 1500; Sacred Heart Cathedral
- Kerri Walsh-Jennings, winner of three consecutive Olympic beach volleyball gold medals, Archbishop Mitty High School
