= Eric Bakhtiari =

American football player (born 1984)

No. 99, 96
- Position: Linebacker

Personal information
- Born: December 2, 1984 (age 41); San Mateo, California, U.S.
- Listed height: 6 ft 3 in (1.91 m)
- Listed weight: 258 lb (117 kg)

Career information
- High school: Burlingame (Burlingame, California)
- College: San Diego
- NFL draft: 2008: undrafted

Career history
- San Diego Chargers (2008)*; San Francisco 49ers (2008)*; San Diego Chargers (2009)*; Tampa Bay Buccaneers (2009)*; Tennessee Titans (2009); San Francisco 49ers (2010)*; Miami Dolphins (2010)*; Kansas City Chiefs (2010)*; Cleveland Browns (2010)*; Kansas City Chiefs (2011)*; San Francisco 49ers (2012)
- * Offseason or practice squad member only

Awards and highlights
- 2× All-American (2006, 2007); 3× First-team All-PFL (2005–2007); 2× PFL Defensive Player of the Year (2006, 2007)

Career NFL statistics
- Tackles: 4
- Stats at Pro Football Reference

Eric Assad Bakhtiari (born December 2, 1984) is an American former professional football player who was a linebacker in the National Football League (NFL). He was signed by the San Diego Chargers as an undrafted free agent in 2008. He played college football for the San Diego Toreros.

Bakhtiari was also a member of the Tampa Bay Buccaneers, Tennessee Titans, Miami Dolphins, Kansas City Chiefs, and San Francisco 49ers. He is the older brother of Green Bay Packers tackle David Bakhtiari.

== College career ==
In 2006, he earned third-team Associated Press All-America honors for all I-AA players, first-team Mid-Major All-American (The Sports Network), 2006 co-Pioneer Football League Defender of the Year, first-team All-Pioneer Football League. Making him a key performer of the USD defensive squad that ranked #2 in scoring defense (12.9 ppg), 10th in rushing defense (107.3 yards per game) and 12th in total defense.

== Professional career ==
Pre-draft measurables
Height	Weight	40-yard dash	10-yard split	20-yard split	20-yard shuttle	Three-cone drill	Vertical jump	Broad jump
6 ft 3 1/8 in (1.91 m)	259 lb (117 kg)	4.80 s	1.61 s	2.73 s	4.48 s	7.49 s	32.0 in (0.81 m)	8 ft 6 in (2.59 m)
All values from Pro Day

=== San Diego Chargers (first stint) ===
Bakhtiari signed with the San Diego Chargers as an undrafted free agent in 2008. He was released by the Chargers on August 30 during final cuts, but re-signed to the practice squad on September 10 when linebacker Shawne Merriman was placed on injured reserve. He was released again on September 23.

=== San Francisco 49ers (first stint) ===
Bakhtiari was signed to the practice squad of the San Francisco 49ers on October 7. He remained there through the end of the season.

=== San Diego Chargers (second stint) ===
After finishing the 2008 season on the practice squad of the 49ers, Bakhtiari was re-signed to a future contract by the San Diego Chargers on January 7, 2009.

=== Tennessee Titans ===
Bakhtiari was signed to the Tennessee Titans' practice squad on November 11, 2009. He was signed off the practice squad to active roster on December 12. He was released by the Titans on September 4, 2010.

=== Kansas City Chiefs ===
Bakhtiari was signed to the Kansas City Chiefs' practice squad on November 18, 2010. On December 3, he was released. On January 13, 2011, he signed with the Chiefs again; on August 29, however, he was waived/injured during the first round of preseason cuts and after passing through waivers unclaimed, was subsequently placed on injured reserve. After reaching an injury settlement, Bakhtiari was released. Despite being on their roster for the 2010 season, he never played in a game during his tenure with the Chiefs.

=== San Francisco 49ers (second stint) ===
Bakhtiari was re-signed by the 49ers during the 2012 preseason. He played in the preseason as a backup to compete on the 53-man roster. After the end of the 2012 preseason, Bakhtiari was cut on August 31, 2012, with 27 other players. However, the 49ers later decided to sign him to a two-year contract.

After releasing him earlier in the year, the 49ers re-signed Bakhtiari on December 12, 2012. On January 1, 2013, Bakhtiari was released by the 49ers to create a roster spot for kicker Billy Cundiff. Cundiff was signed to compete with struggling incumbent kicker David Akers.

== Personal life ==
Bakhtiari is of Iranian and Icelandic descent. His younger brother David is an offensive tackle, who played at Colorado (2009–2012), and for the Green Bay Packers (2013–2023).
