= Junípero Serra High School (San Mateo, California) =

Private Catholic high school in San Mateo, California, United States

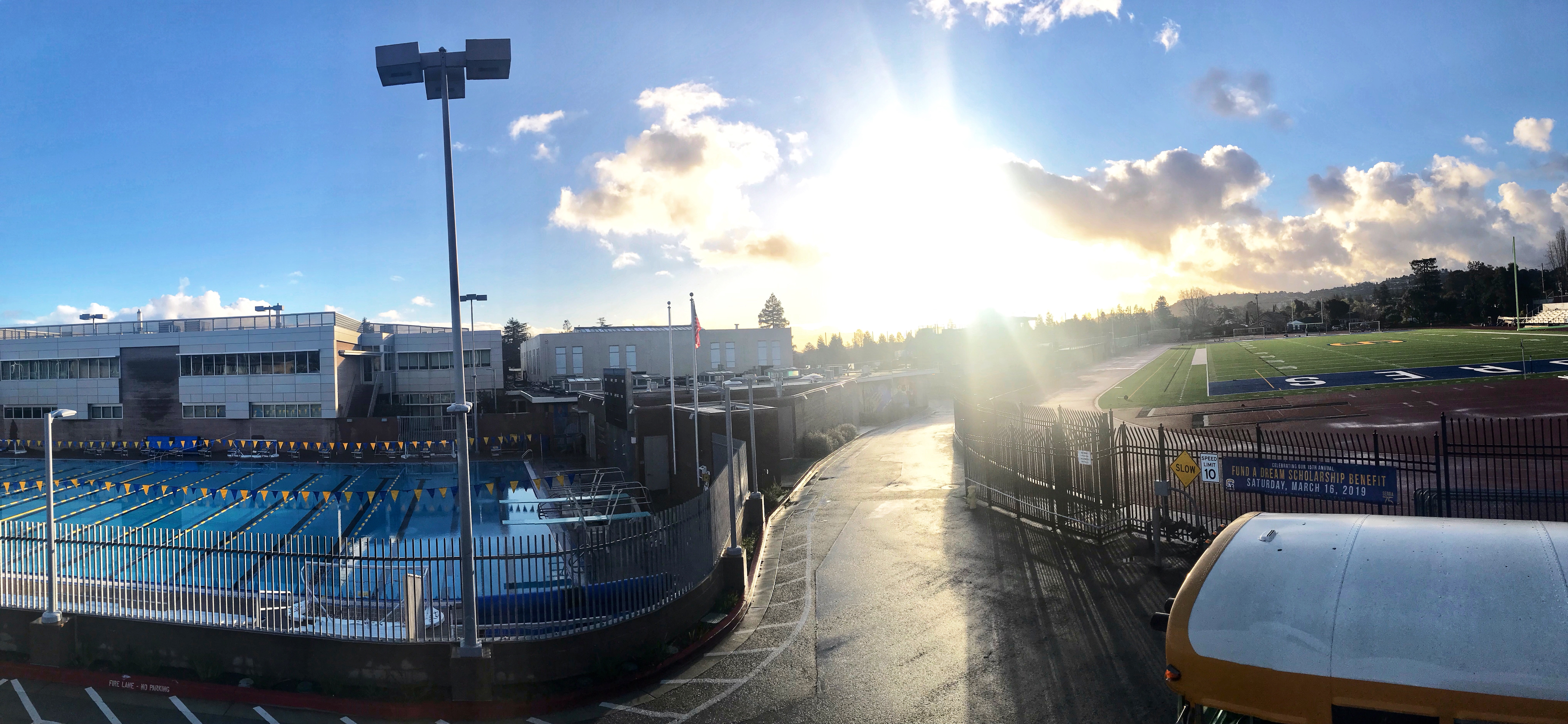
- Junípero Serra campus in 2019

Location
- 451 West 20th Avenue; San Mateo, California 94403; United States; 37°32′46″N 122°19′3″W

Information
- Other names: Serra or JSHS
- Type: Private, catholic, college preparatory
- Religious affiliation: Roman Catholic
- Established: 1944
- Sister school: Mercy High School, Burlingame and Notre Dame High School, Belmont
- President: Mike Fadelli
- Principal: Charlie McGrath
- Grades: 9–12
- Gender: All-Boys
- Enrollment: 860 (2022)
- Campus type: Suburban
- Colors: Blue and Gold
- Athletics conference: West Catholic Athletic League
- Mascot: Padre
- Nickname: Padres
- Accreditation: Western Association of Schools and Colleges
- Newspaper: Serra Friar
- Yearbook: El Padre Yearbook
- School fees: Registration fee: $1,150; Supplemental fee: $2,000
- Tuition: $28,200
- Website: serrahs.com

Junípero Serra High School (commonly Serra or JSHS) is a private, Catholic college preparatory high school in San Mateo, California, United States, serving students in grades 9–12. A part of the Roman Catholic Archdiocese of San Francisco, this school provides education for young men. The school has an academic focus with a college preparatory curriculum.

== School history ==
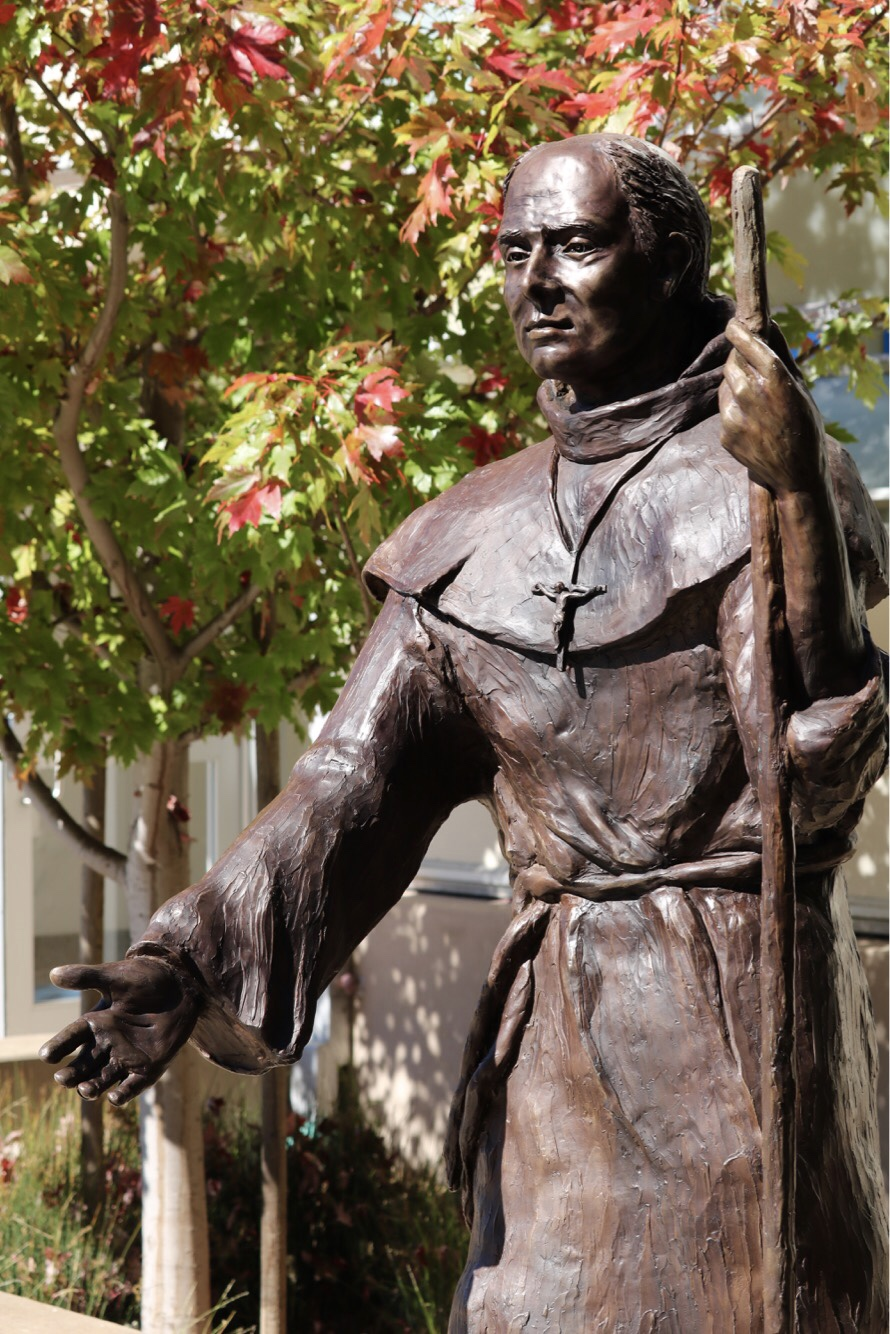
Statue of Saint Junípero Serra at Serra High School.

Serra High School was founded in 1944 by the Catholic Archdiocese of San Francisco and was originally located at Columbia Drive and Alameda de las Pulgas in San Mateo, which is the current site of St. Bartholomew's Catholic Parish. The original student body consisted of 86 freshmen and sophomores. The school moved to new facilities at 451 West 20th Avenue in San Mateo in the fall of 1955 when the student body grew to 576. In 1978, Michael Peterson was named the first lay principal of Serra and Fr. Stephen H. Howell was named the school's first president. From 2002 to 2004, Fr. Joe Bradley (class of '73) served as president, overseeing fundraising efforts for major campus renovation. In 2008, Barry Thornton, Ed.d, was named principal and Lars Lund was named president. Under their tenure, the school expanded course offerings and completed large-scale renovations.

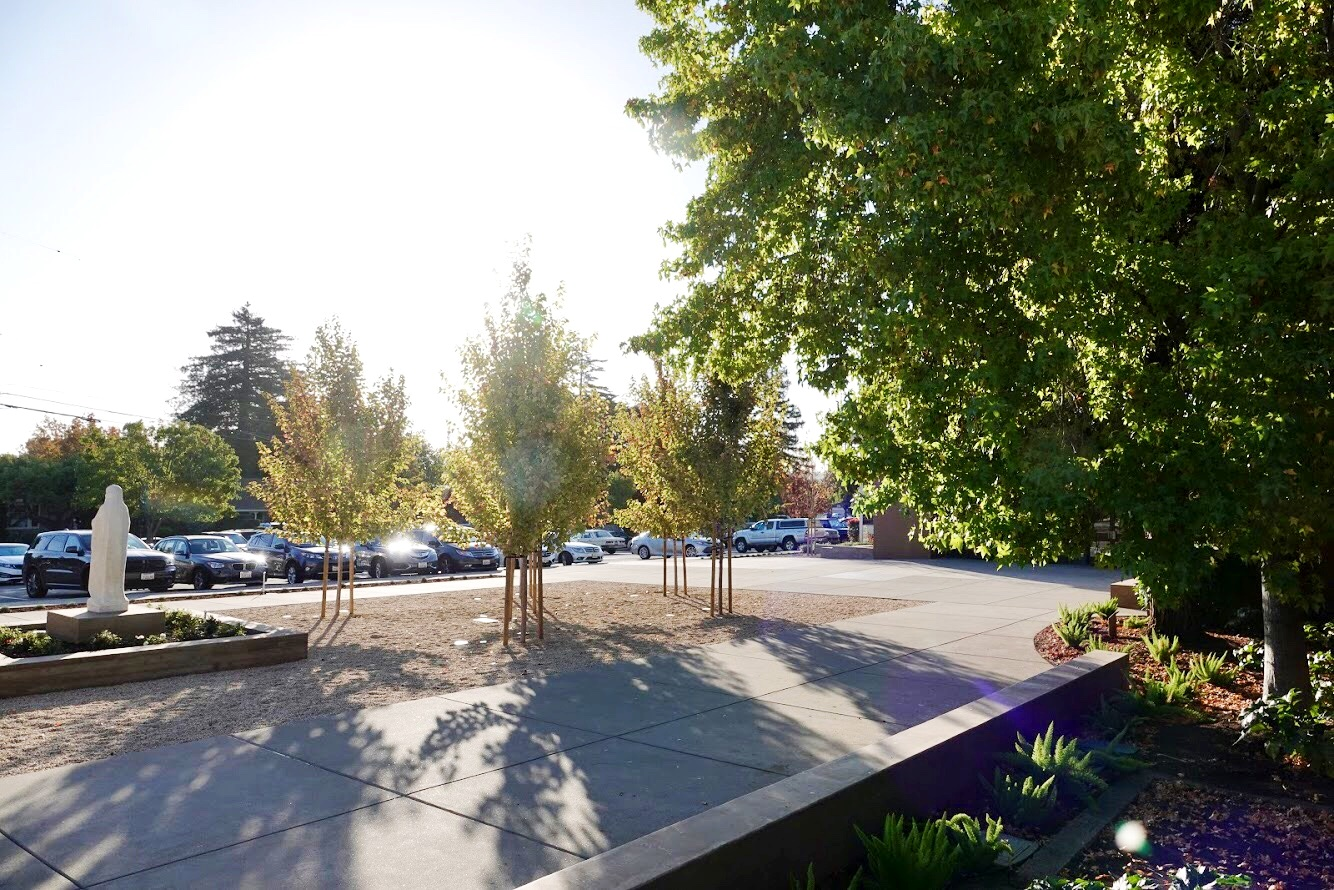
St. Mary's Courtyard

=== Campus renovations ===
Phase I of Serra's master plan was completed in 2005, featuring new facilities for football, baseball, and wrestling, along with a 150-space parking structure. Phase II was completed in 2011, and created five new science lecture-labs, a new music room, two art classrooms, an academic resource center, and a 550,000-gallon infinity pool for competitive aquatics. In 2016, Serra undertook a smaller project, renovating the playing surfaces used for baseball, football, soccer, lacrosse, and track.

== Academics ==
More than 60 percent of Serra students are enrolled in honors and Advanced Placement courses. Serra has averaged an 80 percent AP pass rate over the past five years, which is more than 20 points higher than the national average. Serra's Class of 2018 received more than $27 million in college scholarships. Serra has a one-to-one device program in each classroom and 99 percent of Serra graduates exceed the minimum course requirements set for the CSU and the University of California. Serra features 30 honors and AP classes, and 93 percent of Serra faculty members hold advanced degrees.

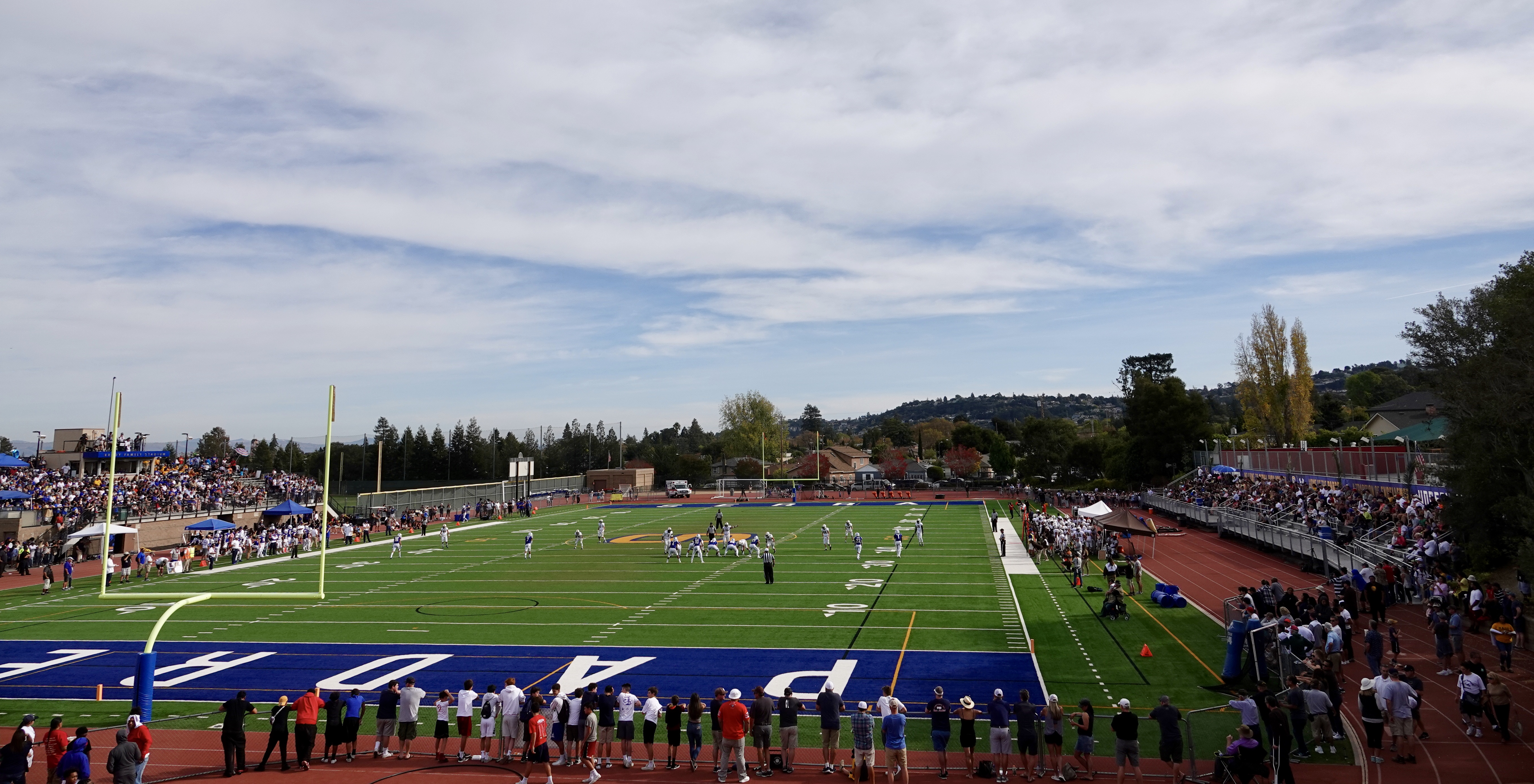
Brady Family Stadium and Freitas Field

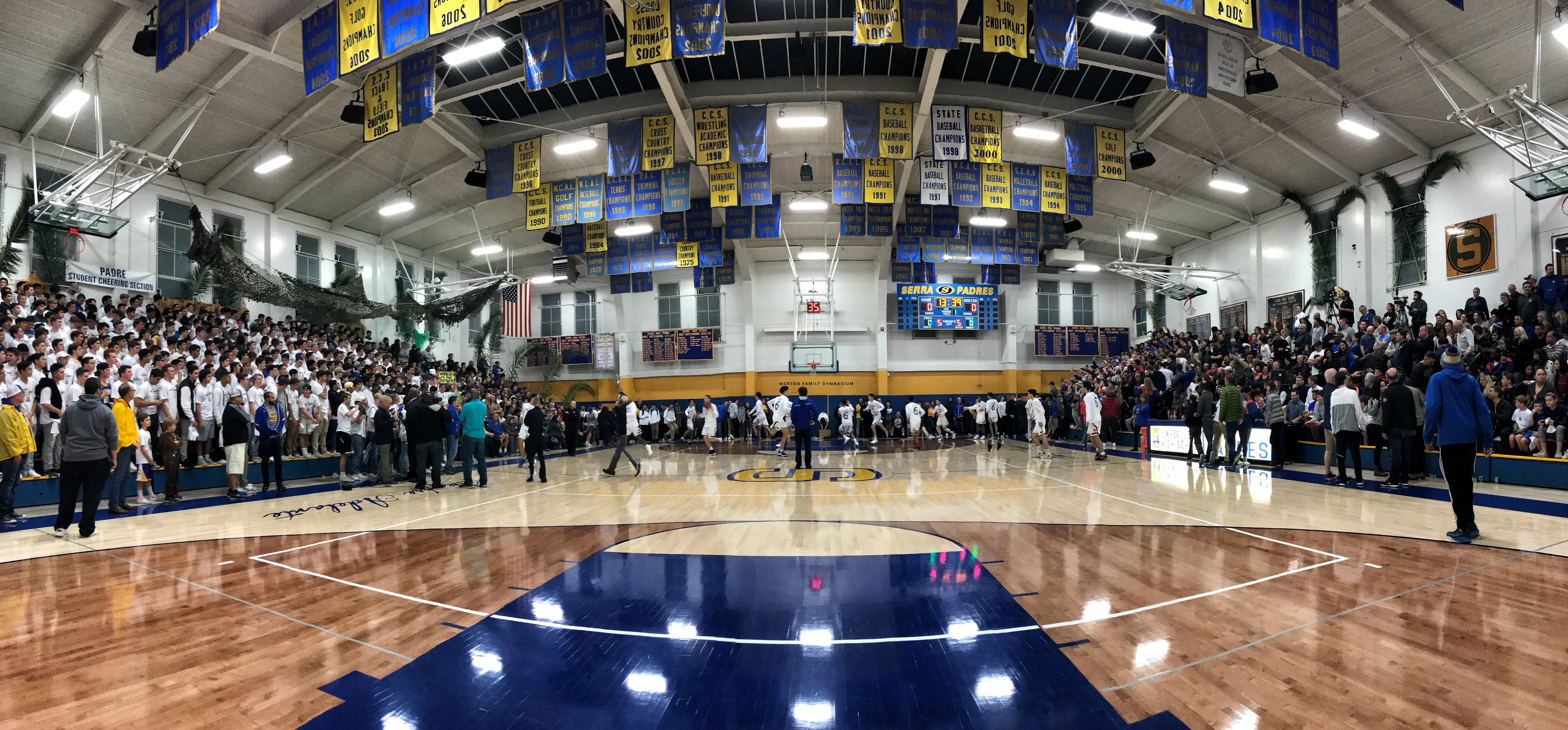
Morton Family Gymnasium

== Athletics ==
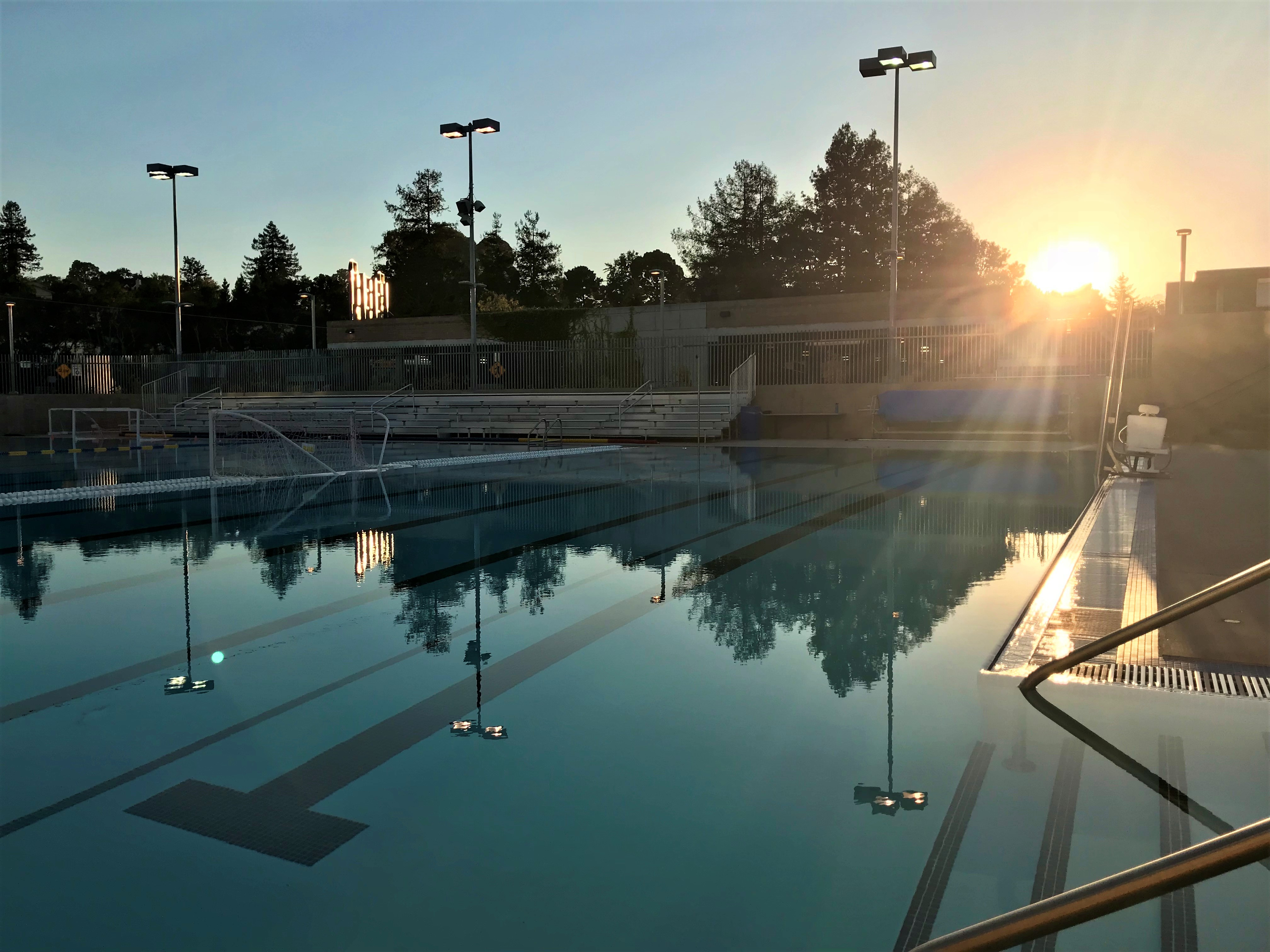
Aquatics Center

The Serra athletic program has grown dramatically since its very modest beginnings in the mid-1940s. For a time in the years after World War II, the San Mateo school offered just three sports: football, basketball, and baseball. Boxing was also available, particularly on one night of the year when so-called student "Golden Gloves" competition was presented. Early on, Serra joined an embryonic Catholic Athletic League, a Bay Area-wide aggregation of what were then small Catholic schools. The Padres had some significant successes in that circuit. Two of its varsity football teams were unbeaten in 1949 and 1954; those remain the only unblemished football teams in school history. Serra captured five CAL baseball championships and seven CAL football crowns. In 1967, as new Catholic schools were opening throughout the region, the Padres joined what was a direct outgrowth of the CAL, the new West Catholic Athletic League. Since that point, Serra's athletic program has flourished.

The school offers 14 competitive team sports. Stars like Tom Brady, Lynn Swann, Barry Bonds, and David Bakhtiari have attended the school. As time went by, the Padres became one of Northern California's signature prep sports entities and the league itself morphed into a state powerhouse. As of early 2018, the school had won 67 West Catholic Athletic League varsity titles, 31 Central Coast Section championships, and two state crowns (basketball in 2016 and football in 2017). Serra athletes had garnered individual state championships in several sports. A number of them had become Olympians. A total of 11 Serra baseball players, including the record-setting Bonds, have played in the major leagues; Jim Fregosi, Serra's first big league star, also managed several teams in the majors. Nearly a dozen Padres have played professional football. Brady and Swann, an all-American at USC and a member of the Pro Football Hall of Fame, were both Super Bowl MVP's. Tom Scott is in the Canadian Football League Hall of Fame. In the mid-1970s, Jesse Freitas led the nation in passing at San Diego State. One of the most dominating exhibitions by a Serra football team occurred in 2017 when the Padres, coached by Patrick Walsh, posted an overall 13–2 record (10–0 vs. West Catholic Athletic League opponents, a feat never accomplished before in the history of the league) and won a California Interscholastic Federation state championship, the first for a San Mateo County high school football team since 1926.

== Spirituality ==
Junípero Serra High School is a Roman Catholic school. It offers faith and theology education through its Campus Ministry program and curriculum. Campus Ministry offers four-day-long Kairos retreats, retreat leadership opportunities, liturgical leadership opportunities and Immersion trips to Watsonville, West Virginia, Nicaragua, San Jose and Los Angeles. The Campus Ministry office also manages the school's Christian Service program. Theology courses offer instruction in the Catholic faith, morality and worship, and stress the importance of individual faith development.

== Tri-School ==
Junípero Serra High School is a part of a program called Tri-School, a partnership with Notre Dame High School, Belmont, and Mercy High School, Burlingame, both all-female schools. The schools host some morning classes with mixed education and collaborate in other activities as well.

== Notable alumni ==
- Norm Angelini, Major League Baseball pitcher
- Drew Azzopardi, college football offensive tackle for the Washington Huskies
- David Bakhtiari, NFL offensive tackle
- Ruben Barrales, Deputy Assistant to President George W. Bush and Director of the Office of Intergovernmental Affairs
- Peter Barsocchini, screenwriter, author, journalist, and television producer
- Bryan Bishop, sound effects engineer
- Hunter Bishop, professional baseball player
- Barry Bonds, Major League Baseball left fielder
- Tom Brady, NFL quarterback, 7× Super Bowl champion
- Henry Caruso, professional basketball player
- Scott Chiamparino, Major League Baseball pitcher
- Tim Cullen, Major League Baseball infielder
- Dustin Delucchi, Major League Baseball outfielder
- Matt Dickerson, NFL defensive end
- Bob Fitzgerald, professional sports play-by-play announcer
- Jim Fregosi, Major League Baseball shortstop and manager
- Jesse Freitas Jr., NFL quarterback
- Danny Frisella, Major League Baseball pitcher
- Kevin Gilbert, songwriter, musician, composer, producer
- Randy Gomez, Major League Baseball catcher
- Greg Gutfeld, political satirist, author, TV personality
- Drew Hodgdon, NFL offensive lineman
- Gary Hughes, Major League Baseball executive and scout
- Gregg Jefferies, Major League Baseball infielder
- William J. Justice, auxiliary bishop in Archdiocese of San Francisco
- Bill Keller, New York Times executive editor
- Joe Kmak, Major League Baseball catcher
- Jim Lanzone, American businessman and CEO of Tinder
- John Lescroart, New York Times bestselling author
- Ray Looze, swimmer swimming coach
- Stephen Lumpkins, professional baseball / basketball player
- Atonio Mafi, NFL guard
- Jeremiah Masoli, CFL quarterback
- Dan Mavraides, professional basketball player
- Tom McBreen, U.S. Olympic swimming gold and bronze medalist
- Mickey McDonald, Major League Baseball player
- Julian Merryweather, Major League Baseball pitcher
- Kevin Mullin, politician
- James Outman, baseball outfielder
- Tony Renda, Major League Baseball player
- John Robinson, NFL / College Football Hall of Fame coach
- Tom Scott, CFL Hall of Famer
- Dan Serafini, MLB pitcher and convicted murderer
- John V. Shields, president and CEO of Trader Joe's
- Michael Shrieve, drummer for Santana
- Lynn Swann, former NFL wide receiver, 4x Super Bowl champion, Pro Football Hall of Famer
- Michael Trucco, actor
- Jack Wilson, NFL offensive lineman
- Easop Winston Jr., NFL wide receiver
