= Presentation High School =

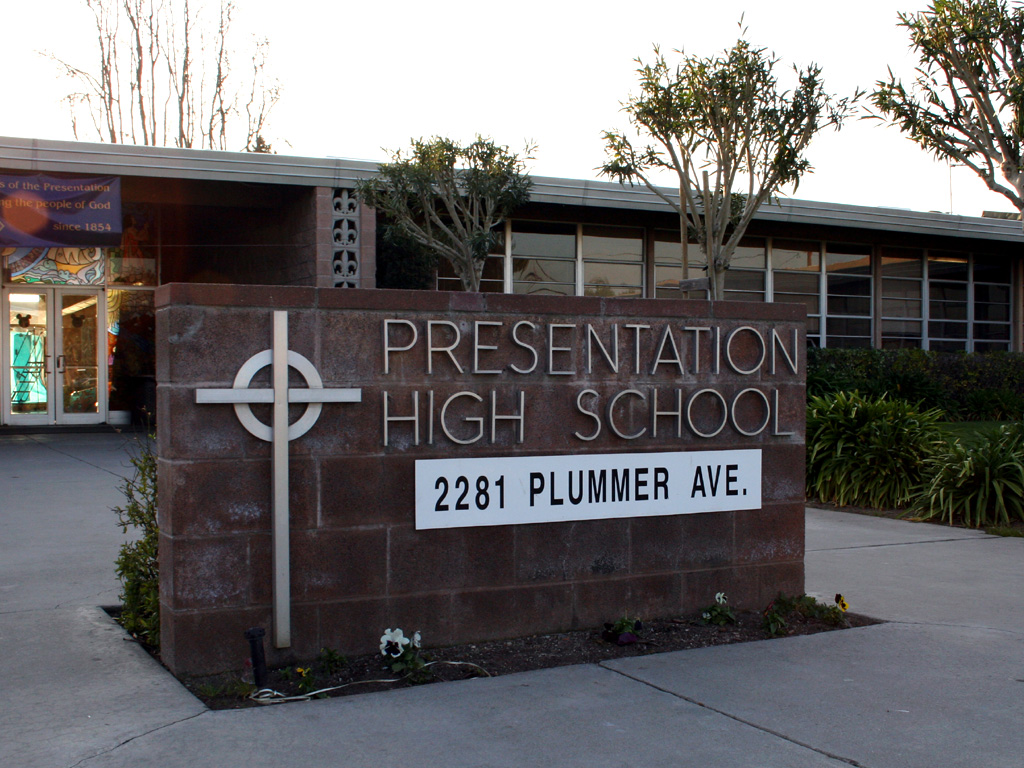

Location
- 2281 Plummer Avenue; San Jose (Willow Glen), California 95125; United States; 37°17′N 121°54′W

Information
- Type: Private, All-Female
- Motto: Not Words, But Deeds
- Religious affiliation: Roman Catholic
- Established: 1962
- Sister school: Bellarmine College Preparatory, Notre Dame High School (San Jose)
- Principal: Kristina Luscher
- Grades: 9–12
- Enrollment: 600 (2022–2023)
- Campus: Suburban
- Colors: Blue; Gold; White
- Song: Alma Mater
- Athletics conference: CIF Central Coast Section (West Catholic Athletic League)
- Nickname: Panthers
- Accreditation: Western Association of Schools and Colleges
- Newspaper: The Voice
- Yearbook: Honora
- Tuition: US $31,220 (2025–2026)
- Affiliation: Presentation Sisters
- Website: www.presentationhs.org

Presentation High School is a private, Catholic, college preparatory school for girls established in 1962. It is owned and run by the Sisters of the Presentation, and operates within the Diocese of San Jose in California. The school is located in the Willow Glen area of San Jose, California, United States. Students come to Presentation from 154 different schools in 62 zip codes around the Bay Area. On top of being superior in academics, Presentation High School also offers more than 60 diverse clubs, teams, programs and affinity groups for its students to choose from. The Robotics Club (Team 2135) is recognized by the FIRST Robotics Competition. This helps young women explore the STEM fields by hands-on engineering, programming and design.

== Athletics ==
The following sports are offered at Presentation:

- Basketball
- Competitive Dance
- Cross country
- Field hockey
- Golf
- Lacrosse
- Soccer
- Softball
- Swimming & diving
- Tennis
- Track and field
- Volleyball
- Water polo
- Wrestling

== Notable alumni ==
- Danielle Slaton, USA Olympic soccer player
- Aly Wagner, USA Olympic soccer player
- Jennifer Joines, USA Olympic indoor volleyball player
- Jennifer Cihi, Singer (Broadway, Television)
- Candi Milo, voice actress
