= Archbishop Riordan High School =

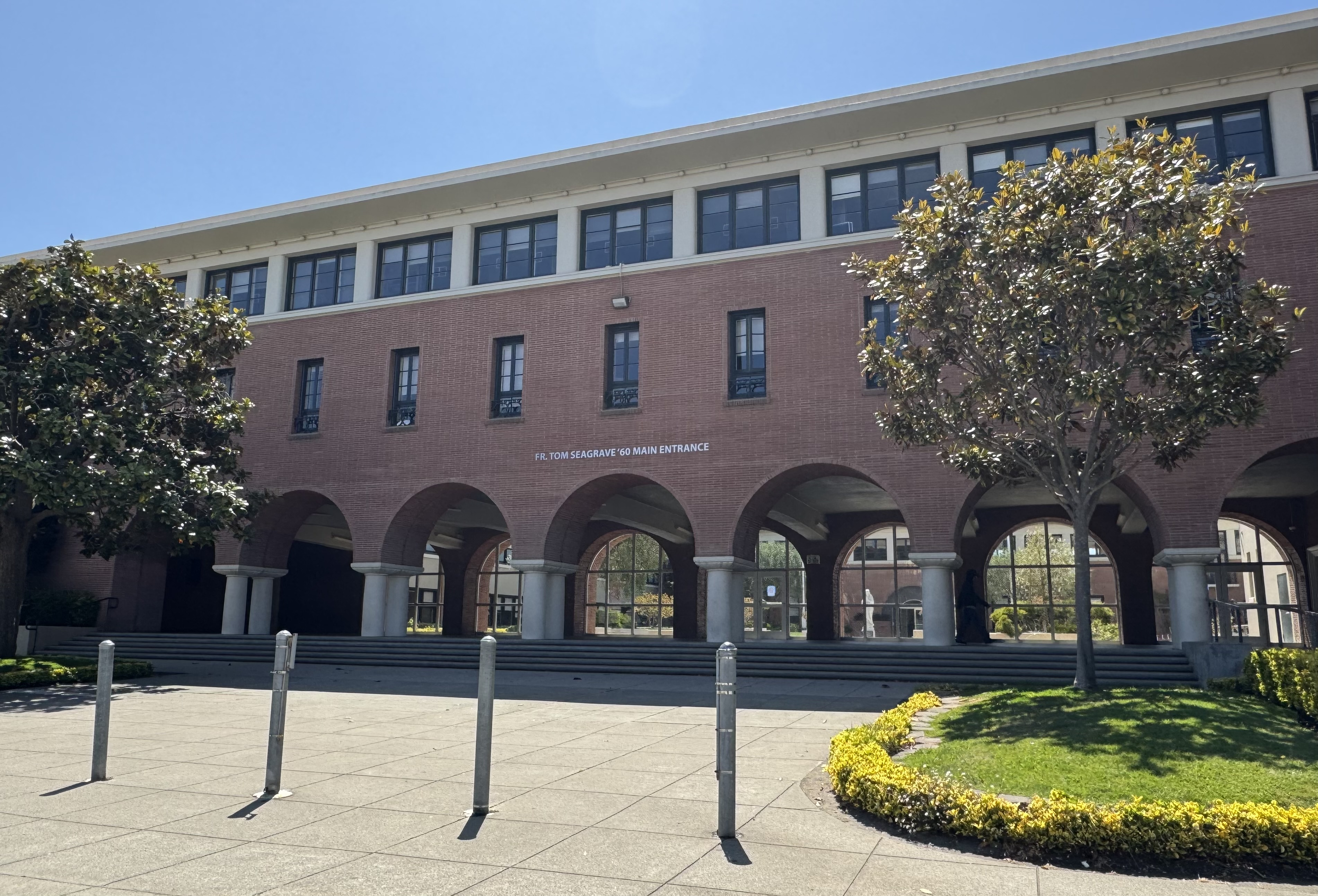
- Main Entrance

Location
- 175 Frida Kahlo Way; San Francisco, California 94112; United States; 37°43′40″N 122°27′11″W

Information
- Type: Private, co-ed
- Motto: Mihi Vivere Christus Est (For Me to Live Is Christ)
- Religious affiliations: Catholic; Marianist
- Established: 1949 (as St. James, 1906)
- School district: Archdiocese Of San Francisco
- President: Timothy Reardon
- Teaching staff: 65.5 (on an FTE basis)
- Grades: 9-12
- Enrollment: 976 (2021–2022)
- Student to teacher ratio: 14.9
- Campus: Urban
- Colors: Purple and gold
- Athletics conference: West Catholic Athletic League
- Team name: Crusaders
- Accreditation: Western Association of Schools and Colleges
- Publication: Future
- Newspaper: The Crusader
- Yearbook: Lance
- Tuition: $28,000
- Website: riordanhs.org

Archbishop Riordan High School is a diocesan, co-ed Catholic high school established by the Society of Mary in San Francisco, California. It is part of the Archdiocese of San Francisco. It opened in fall 1949 as Riordan High School, named after Archbishop Patrick William Riordan, the second Archbishop of San Francisco; "Archbishop" was officially added to its name in 1990.

Riordan was the oldest exclusively male high school in San Francisco until it became coeducational in 2020.

== The Marianists ==
The Marianist Organization has remained a guiding force throughout Riordan's existence and follows several specific "Characteristics of Education in the Marianist Tradition":

- Educate for formation in faith
- Provide an integral, quality education
- Educate in family spirit
- Educate for service, justice and peace
- Educate for adaptation & change

== Academics ==
Archbishop Riordan High School offers a variety of Honors and Advanced Placement courses. Advanced Placement offerings include:

- AP Biology
- AP Calculus AB
- AP Calculus BC
- AP Chemistry
- AP Chinese Language and Culture
- AP Computer Science
- AP Economics (Micro and Macro)
- AP Environmental Science
- AP Physics C
- AP English Language
- AP English Literature
- AP Spanish Language
- AP Statistics
- AP World History
- AP United States History
- AP United States Government

Archbishop Riordan is the home of four AP exam readers. As of 2015, 426 AP tests were administered to 218 students, with 67% of those scores qualifying for college credit.

In 2016, Archbishop Riordan expanded their curriculum offerings to launch a four-year honors engineering program track. Students apply to the program when applying to the school and are accepted based on their 7th and 8th grade math and science grades, performance on standardized tests, demonstrated ability to handle a rigorous course load, and demonstrated interest in the area of engineering. In addition to taking two engineering courses each year, students are expected to take advanced math and science courses that complement the engineering offerings and prepare them for a college-level engineering major.

Archbishop Riordan High School operates a residential boarding program with students from nine countries currently living on campus. The program is one of only a few that are located in a major US city.

== House system ==
In the fall of 2017, the school launched a House System to increase school unity. As incoming freshmen, students are divided into one of the four houses: Cana, Bolts, Russi, and Pilar. Within each house, students are divided into "R-Time" rooms, a homeroom classroom they remain in throughout their four years at Riordan and meet with nearly every morning. The four houses work together to participate in community service events and compete in intra-school competitions, such as the Crusader Games and Frosh Olympics. Houses are also used to group and organize students for school masses and assemblies.

== Technology use ==
Archbishop Riordan began its 1:1 iPad program in 2012. Many students were expected to buy an iPad and the required apps for the school year. The school was finally able to adapt to this new technology during the second semester, and it was used to its full potential.

Currently, each student is required to bring their own device, such as a Chromebook, iPad, or laptop, for use during class. Schoology is used for managing assignments digitally and working on schoolwork in nearly every class. Though the official rules on smartphone use during school prohibit use of phones in the hallways and especially during class, they are very loosely enforced.

== Student body ==
In January 2020, it was announced that Archbishop Riordan High School would become a co-educational institution starting in the fall.

The inaugural co-ed student body of 820 was 23% female and 77% male.

The student population is currently 25% Hispanic, 24.5% Asian, 22.2% Caucasian, 13% multi-ethnic, 8% African American, 1.3% Pacific Islander, 1.2% Native American, and 4.6% unknown.

== Student life and campus ministry ==
Four retreats are offered to students, with Kairos Retreats in the fall, winter, and spring. Sophomores and juniors have the chance to have an overnight retreat twice per year. Annual drives are held, such as the "Every Penny Counts" campaign for AIDS patients, the International Drive to support Our Lady of Nazareth, Nairobi, Kenya M. Primary School, and annual Blood Drives.

There are 34 clubs at Riordan, ranging from the Knights Club, which gives students leadership opportunities and leads tours of the school for potential new students, to the DJ Club, which provides music for school events and the morning telecast. The school strongly advises students to participate in activities, with a Club Fair being held at the beginning of each school year to encourage students to join clubs and get engaged.

== Marching and concert bands ==
Riordan has marching, concert, jazz, and pep bands. The majority of musicians pick up their new instruments in their freshman year while enrolled in the Instrumental Music Ensemble (Beginning Band). They move into the Intermediate Band as sophomores and join the marching band in the second semester and their junior and senior years. The band program is one of the few high school music programs that starts students with no musical experience.

The band competes in the Northern California Band Association (NCBA) along with many other bands from all over the Bay Area. It competes in the small schools division (Class D or E) and is one of the biggest bands in its division, with around 90 members. The band appears in every San Francisco city parade (Columbus Day, Veteran's Day, Chinese New Year, and St. Patrick's Day). In 2010 and 2012, the band was invited to perform as part of the San Francisco Giants Victory Parade down Market Street. They also played at the 2013 America's Cup in San Francisco, Super Bowl 50, and the New Year's Day Parades in Rome (2017 & 2024), and London (2019).

The school also has a Pep Band, a Jazz Combo that regularly participates in California Musical Educators competitions, a drumline, and a Color Guard team that performs with the band during parades. The band travels each year and visited Disneyland in 2009, 2011, and 2015 and notably visited Rome and the Vatican in 2024. There are 160 students in the band program, averaging to nearly one out of every four students being in the band program.

== Theater ==
Two productions are made year-round, a fall play and a spring musical. Productions are held in Lindland Theater, one of the largest high school theaters in the city. Students can get involved through acting in a production, being member of stage crew, or take an acting class as part of Riordan's regular academic curriculum.

== Alma mater and fight song ==
The Archbishop Riordan alma mater was written in 1949 by Br. Carl Spooner, SM. Following all sporting events the alma mater is sung by the team and alumni, traditionally accompanied by the Archbishop Riordan band. The alma mater is sung with the right pointer finger pointed towards the sky.

== Athletics ==
The Riordan Crusaders field a variety of team and individual sports in the West Catholic Athletic League (WCAL). Sports that Riordan fields include football, cross country, wrestling, basketball, soccer, track, volleyball, swimming, tennis, baseball, sailing and golf. Its sailing team trains at the St. Francis Yacht Club and participates in regattas throughout the state, including in the NorCal league of the Pacific Coast Interscholastic Sailing Association. Riordan's most notable championship seasons include a WCAL Championship in football in 2000 and a 2007 Division II CCS championship, a CIF State Championship in basketball in 2002, a WCAL championship in track in 2004, a CCS title in track in 2005, and a Division III CCS championship in basketball in 2006 and in 2007, 2016, and 2019.

Tyrone McGraw, '06, in a football game for the Crusaders against Burlingame

=== 1950s ===
Participating in the newly created Catholic League for high schools around San Francisco, the student body enthusiastically supported the program, as Riordan fielded new sports every few years. Notable events of the decade include the first football game at Riordan (September 18, 1951), the first homecoming night rally (November 10, 1955), the Riordan versus St. Ignatius College Preparatory football game at Seals Stadium (November 3, 1956), the Faculty versus Seniors basketball game (April 4, 1957), and the Block Society's sponsoring of Fight Night, which featured eight boxing matches as well as wrestling and judo (March 28, 1958).

Sports at Riordan were initially shaped by Edward Fennelly, a then 24-year-old graduate of St. Joseph's High School in Alameda. He coached the basketball and track teams, and expanded his influence on the Riordan teams in the following years. To many, he is a symbol of the origins and development of Riordan, and to thousands of alumni he was the epitome of sportsmanship and gentlemanly behavior. He coached, taught, and served as an administrator for 40 years.

=== 1960s ===
Joining the new West Catholic Athletic League in 1967, the Crusaders were successful in a number of athletic endeavors. The victory bell was introduced, which still resides in the junior hallway of the school. It was put to good use, as basketball won varsity championships in '60, '68, and '69; cross country won championships in '65, '66, '68, and '69); football in '66; and track in '67 and '68.

As the CAL divided, and Riordan joined the WCAL, Ed Fennelly became commissioner. This coincided with the 1966 football team's dramatic championship win against league powerhouse Bellarmine. Under "Doc" Erskine, the Crusaders battled the Bellarmine Bells under the lights of Kezar Stadium to come out on top, 13–10. In their exuberance after the game, students tore down the goalposts at Kezar, fashioning trophies from the wood. These trophies, signed by the team, reside in the Crusader Forum today, memorializing their legendary upset for the first WCAL championship.

=== 1970s ===
The '70s saw the most varsity championships (13 in all) and the greatest varsity record (six sports). They included one each in track and cross country, two in football and baseball, three in basketball, and four in soccer. The varsity soccer team won four consecutive WCAL titles and the Central Coast Section championship in 1976.

Riordan saw the birth of Camp Crusader, a summer camp for future Riordan athletes started in 1974 for boys in 4th through 8th grades. Consisting of two three-week sessions, hundreds of youngsters swarmed to Riordan. Original organized leagues included baseball, football, soccer, basketball, pee-wee golf, tennis, track, field hockey, tumbling, wrestling, and bowling. Each participant received a camp polo shirt and a trip to see the Giants at Candlestick Park.

=== 1980s ===
Riordan won six straight basketball championships from 1985 to 1990, going to sectional and state championships several times.

=== 2020s ===
With the school's transition to co-education, Riordan Athletics added 9 new men's and women's sports teams for the 2020–21 school year, including volleyball and swimming.

== Notable alumni ==
- Francisco Aragón, class of 1984 – Latin poet, editor, and writer; attended University of California at Berkeley and University of Notre Dame
- Alton Byrd, class of 1975 – former professional basketball player
- Alberto Cruz, class of 1989 – former professional soccer player; played with the U.S. national team in 1991
- Donald Haderle, class of 1962 – former Chief Technology Officer and Fellow at IBM
- Warren Hinckle, class of 1956 – political journalist and San Francisco Chronicle columnist
- Tony Jones, class of 1989 – professional wrestler; had stints in World Wrestling Entertainment
- Chris Lawson, class of 2025 – college football wide receiver for the Washington Huskies
- Derek Loville, class of 1986 – three-time Super Bowl winner for the San Francisco 49ers and Denver Broncos; former NFL running back for the San Francisco 49ers, Denver Broncos, and Seattle Seahawks
- Chris Munk, class of 1985 – former NBA player for the Utah Jazz
- Kevin Restani, class of 1970 – former basketball player for the University of San Francisco; former NBA player for the Milwaukee Bucks, Sacramento Kings, San Antonio Spurs and Cleveland Cavaliers
- Steve Ryan, class of 1974 – former professional soccer player; played for the San Jose Earthquakes
- Sean Scott, class of 1983
- Steve Sewell, class of 1981 – former NFL running back for the Denver Broncos and University of Oklahoma
- Joe Spano, class of 1963 – Emmy-nominated actor starring in Hill Street Blues
- Donald Strickland, class of 1998 – former cornerback for the Indianapolis Colts, Philadelphia Eagles, and San Francisco 49ers
- John Tofi, class of 2002 - former professional basketball player for University of Texas at El Paso and Okapi Aalst
- Gary W. Thomas – attorney and judge
- Eric Wright, class of 2003 – NFL cornerback for the Cleveland Browns, Detroit Lions, Tampa Bay Buccaneers, and San Francisco 49ers
