= Jack Wilson (offensive lineman) =

American football player (born 1999)

Profile
- Position: Offensive tackle

Personal information
- Born: October 22, 1999 (age 27); Montara, California, U.S.
- Listed height: 6 ft 11 in (2.11 m)
- Listed weight: 310 lb (141 kg)

Career information
- High school: Junípero Serra (San Mateo, California)
- College: Oregon State (basketball, 2018–2019); Idaho (basketball, 2019–2020); Washington State (football, 2020–2022 and basketball, 2022–2023); Minnesota (basketball, 2023–2024)
- NFL draft: 2024: undrafted

Career history
- Indianapolis Colts (2024–2025)*
- * Offseason or practice squad member only
- Stats at Pro Football Reference

Jack Wilson (born October 22, 1999) is an American professional football tackle. He played college football for the Washington State Cougars. He also played college basketball for the Minnesota Golden Gophers, Washington State Cougars, Idaho Vandals, and Oregon State Beavers.

== Early life ==
Wilson was born October 22, 1999, in Montara, California, and attended Junípero Serra High School in San Mateo, California. The number one-ranked center recruit in the West region, he was a four-star basketball recruit coming out of high school and committed to play for the Oregon State Beavers.

== College career ==
Wilson attended four different universities, and as an athlete was primarily a basketball player. He spent the 2018–2019 season with the Oregon State Beavers basketball team, the 2019–2020 season with the Idaho Vandals basketball team, the 2020–2023 seasons with the Washington State Cougars basketball and football teams, and the 2023–2024 season with the Minnesota Golden Gophers basketball team.

=== Oregon State ===
Wilson appeared in seven games with Oregon State before withdrawing from the program.

=== Idaho ===
Wilson left the Oregon State program in December 2018, committing to Idaho in January 2019. Idaho head coach Don Verlin called Wilson a "high character young man" who had "demonstrated the ability to have success both on the court and in the classroom" in a statement announcing Wilson's recruitment to the Vandals.

Wilson was required to wait until the following season to play for Idaho due to NCAA transfer rules. He averaged 4.2 points and 3.2 rebounds per game in 18 games at Idaho.

=== Washington State ===
Wilson left the Idaho basketball program in January 2020, deciding to focus on pursuing a career as a strength and conditioning coach. He began interning with the Washington State basketball program, where he became acquainted with the strength and conditioning staff of the school's football program. Interested in Wilson's size and athleticism, the football staff offered Wilson a walk-on position on the football team. Wilson was initially recruited to play as an edge rusher, but was soon moved to the offensive line. He redshirted for one year with the football program and played for two more, primarily on special teams in a total of 25 games.

Wilson was the tallest player in the history of the Washington State football program. He was the first Washington State student to play both basketball and football since Brandon Gibson in the 2007–2008 season.

=== Minnesota ===
Wilson transferred from Washington State to pursue a master's degree in exercise science and to play for a basketball team that would offer him more playing time. NCAA rules around eligibility and the COVID-19 pandemic allowed Wilson to play a final year in basketball but did not afford him an extra year of eligibility in football. He was offered a scholarship with Minnesota. Announcing Wilson's addition to the team, Minnesota head coach Ben Johnson called him a "strong, physical player", a "willing worker", and a "good athlete." He recorded 11 points and six rebounds in seven games at Minnesota.

Wilson played in a total of 50 games in his college basketball career.

== Professional career ==
Pre-draft measurables
Height	Weight	Arm length	Hand span	40-yard dash	10-yard split	20-yard split	20-yard shuttle	Three-cone drill	Vertical jump	Broad jump	Bench press
6 ft 10 1/8 in (2.09 m)	298 lb (135 kg)	34 7/8 in (0.89 m)	9 1/4 in (0.23 m)	5.42 s	1.83 s	3.08 s	4.95 s	8.02 s	29.0 in (0.74 m)	9 ft 1 in (2.77 m)	26 reps
All values from Pro Day

The Indianapolis Colts signed Wilson to the team's practice squad on October 9, 2024. He was released later in the season, but he signed a reserve/futures contract with the team on January 8, 2025.

Wilson joined Mo Alie-Cox as former college basketball players to play concurrently on the Colts. At a height of 6 feet 11 inches, if Wilson were to see playing time, he would be the tallest player to ever play in an NFL game.

On July 28, 2025, the Colts placed Wilson on injured reserve after he sustained a pectoral injury.

Wilson was waived/injured by the Colts on April 30, 2026 and placed on injured reserve. He was waived from injured reserve on May 14.
