= David Bakhtiari =

American football player (born 1991)

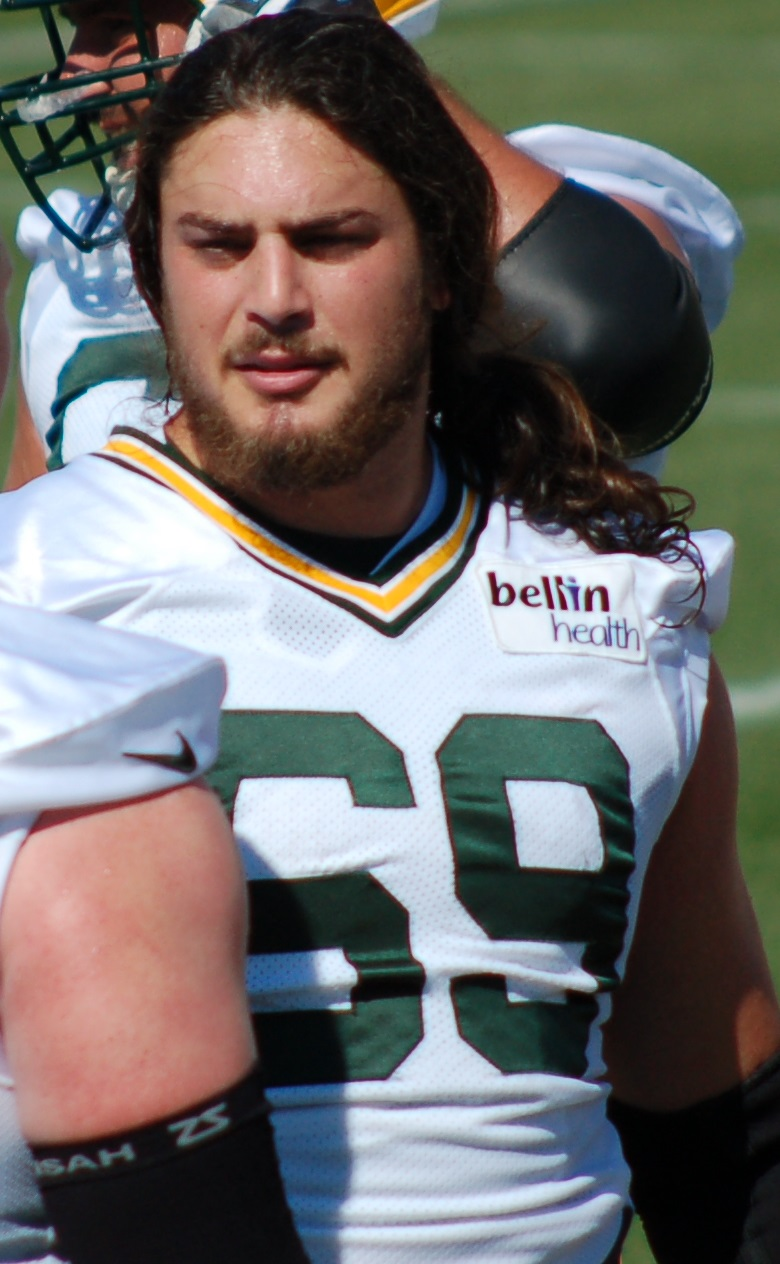
- Bakhtiari with the Green Bay Packers in 2015

No. 69
- Position: Offensive tackle

Personal information
- Born: September 30, 1991 (age 35); San Mateo, California, U.S.
- Listed height: 6 ft 4 in (1.93 m)
- Listed weight: 315 lb (143 kg)

Career information
- High school: Junípero Serra (San Mateo)
- College: Colorado (2009–2012)
- NFL draft: 2013: 4th round, 109th overall pick

Career history
- Green Bay Packers (2013–2023)

Awards and highlights
- 2× First-team All-Pro (2018, 2020); 3× Second-team All-Pro (2016, 2017, 2019); 3× Pro Bowl (2016, 2019, 2020); 2× Second-team All-Pac-12 (2011–2012)

Career NFL statistics
- Games played: 131
- Games started: 131
- Stats at Pro Football Reference

David Afrasiab Assad Bakhtiari (born September 30, 1991) is an American former professional football offensive tackle. Selected by the Green Bay Packers of the National Football League (NFL) in the fourth round of the 2013 NFL draft, Bakhtiari played for the Packers for 11 seasons. He played college football for the Colorado Buffaloes from 2009 to 2012.

== Early life ==
David Afrasiab Assad Bakhtiari was born on September 30, 1991, in San Mateo, California. His older brother, Eric Bakhtiari, went on to play defensive end at the University of San Diego and for numerous NFL teams, most recently the San Francisco 49ers in 2012. His father, Karl Bakhtiari, immigrated from Iran and runs a real estate business in California. His mother is of Icelandic descent. His father is of Bakhtiari Lur descent.

He attended Junípero Serra High School in San Mateo, California, where he lettered two years in football and lacrosse, being named a team captain during his second year. A notable performance during his high school career in football came against Sacred Heart Cathedral Preparatory, in which he held future USC Trojan Kevin Greene to no sacks and only allowed two tackles. In another game later in the season, he had at least eight pancake blocks. He was named Honorable Mention All-West Catholic Athletic League, All-Metro (Bay Area), and All-San Mateo County as a senior when he helped lead his team to a 6–1 league record, winning the 2008 WCAL Co-Championship with Bellarmine College Preparatory, and made it to the CIF-CCS Open Division Semi-finals, where they lost to the eventual champion Bellarmine Bells. He was also listed in the Bay Area News Group as number eight out of 25 players from northern California on their 2008 Cream of the Crop team.

Coming out of high school, Bakhtiari was 6 feet 4 inches (1.93 m) tall and weighed 266 pounds (121 kg) and was ranked only as a two-star prospect by Rivals.com. In a 2009 interview, Bakhtiari commented: "People come up to me and go, 'Oh, you're only a two-star'. But I don't really care what my ranking is. All that matters is how you do when you put on the pads." He received interest from several schools, receiving offers and visiting Colorado, Utah, UTEP, and Washington before signing his letter of intent with Colorado. He graduated high school in 2009.

== College career ==
Bakhtiari decided to play for the University of Colorado, majoring in communications while playing for the Colorado Buffaloes football team from 2009 to 2012. He redshirted as a true freshman in 2009.

During his first year on the field for the Buffaloes, he played in all twelve games, starting eleven. The one game he did not start was against Texas Tech, but he still was on the field for 24 snaps. He played the third-most snaps on the offense behind future New England Patriots and New York Giants offensive tackle Nate Solder and future Denver Broncos guard Ryan Miller with 796. Bakhtiari had 59 knockdown blocks, which was fourth on the team, his highest number coming against Iowa State. He allowed one quarterback sack and seven pressures and was flagged for six penalties. During the game against Kansas that year, he recovered an offensive fumble and returned it seven yards. For his efforts, he was named as an honorable mention for Freshman All-American honors by collegefootballnews.com. He was also a member of the All-Big 12-second-team for Academics.

Bakhtiari's redshirt sophomore campaign began with a severe injury to his knee in the season opener against Hawai’i on the seventh play of the game. He missed the next two games against California and LSU. Nonetheless, he still started the remaining games (11 total). He allowed two sacks on the year and was flagged once the entire season. At the end of the year, he was named as a member to the All-Pac-12 Conference second-team by the league's coaches and Phil Steele.

Before his final season started, Bakhtiari was named to the preseason first-team All-Pac-12 squad. He started eleven games at left tackle, missing the game against Oregon with a knee sprain after attempting to play in the pre-game. He totaled 41 pancake blocks, and allowed 2.5 quarterback sacks and one pressure. His efforts gained him a spot on the watchlists for the Outland Trophy and the Rotary Lombardi Award. Additionally, he earned second-team honors by the league coaches for the second year in a row.

On January 8, 2013, Bakhtiari announced his decision to forgo his senior season at Colorado and declare for the 2013 NFL draft. He added that his declaration for the draft had nothing to do with Colorado's 1–11 season the year before and subsequent firing of head coach Jon Embree. Mike MacIntyre, the new head coach of Colorado, said that the team would have loved to have him but would fully support him in his endeavors.

== Professional career ==
After declaring for the NFL draft, Bakhtiari stated he received a second or third round evaluation from the NFL Draft Advisory Board.

External videos
- David Bakhtiari's NFL Combine workout

Pre-draft measurables
Height	Weight	Arm length	Hand span	40-yard dash	10-yard split	20-yard split	20-yard shuttle	Three-cone drill	Vertical jump	Broad jump	Bench press	Wonderlic
6 ft 4 1/4 in (1.94 m)	299 lb (136 kg)	34 in (0.86 m)	9 1/2 in (0.24 m)	5.09 s	1.77 s	2.94 s	4.74 s	7.70 s	25.5 in (0.65 m)	8 ft 5 in (2.57 m)	28 reps	25
All results from NFL Combine

The Green Bay Packers selected Bakhtiari in the fourth round, (109th overall) of the 2013 NFL draft. He was the ninth offensive tackle drafted and the first of two the Green Bay Packers drafted ahead of fourth round pick JC Tretter (122nd overall).

During the Packers' 'Family Night' inter squad scrimmage later in training camp, starting left tackle Bryan Bulaga succumbed to a torn ACL injury. Due to the injury and Bakhtiari's play during training camp, he was inserted as the starting left tackle in the Packers first preseason game against the Arizona Cardinals at Lambeau Field. Though they lost, it was later noted that one of the positives to take away was the steady play of the rookies. He later went on to start every game at left tackle for the Packers, becoming the first rookie to do so in Green Bay since the start of the 16-game schedule employed by the NFL since 1978 and the only NFL rookie to start every game that season at left tackle in 2013. He was a key contributor to Green Bay finishing seventh in the league for rushing (blocking for rookie running back Eddie Lacy) and sixth in passing for the first time since 2004.

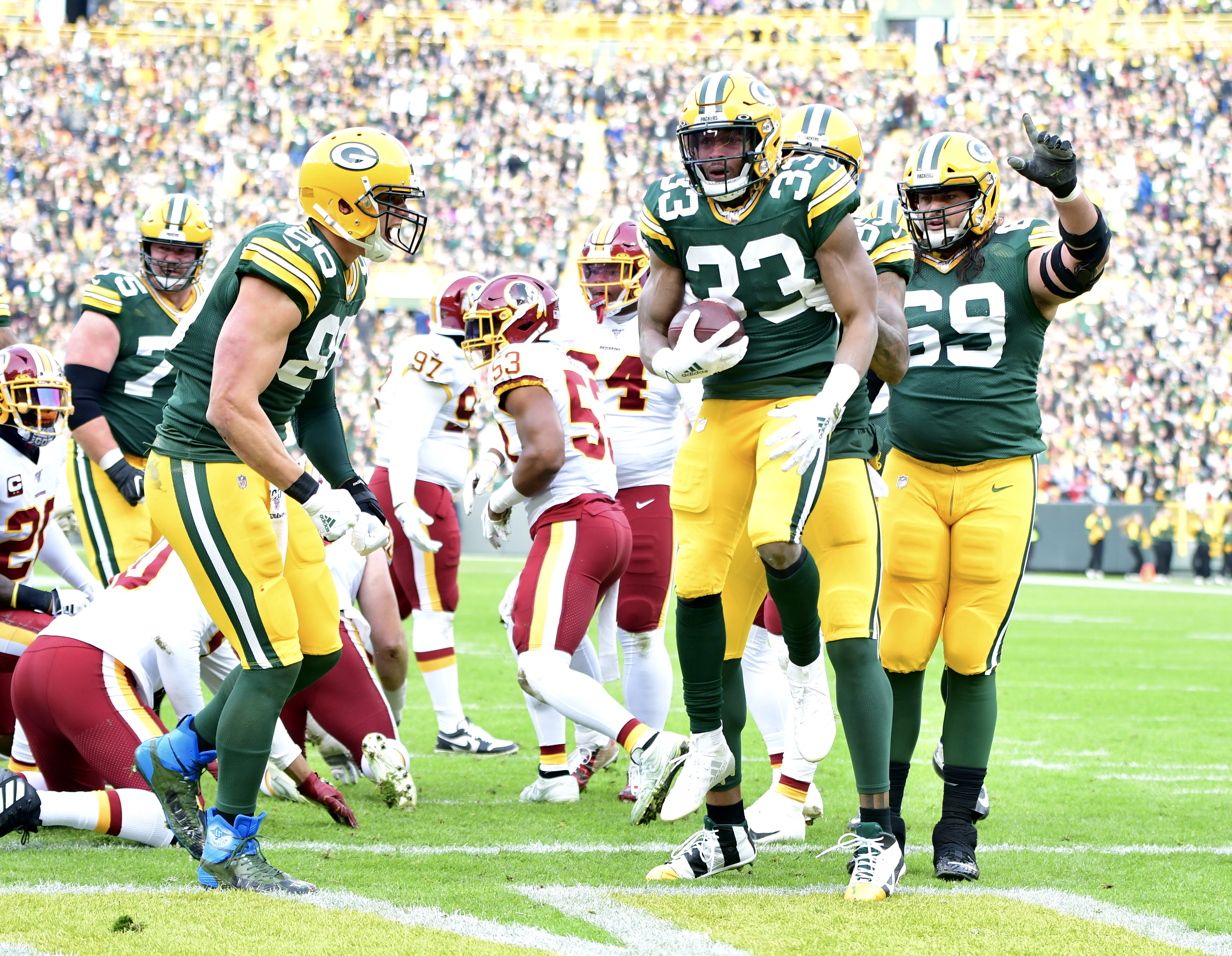
Bakhtiari celebrating with teammates after an Aaron Jones touchdown against the Washington Redskins in 2019

Following his rookie season, Bakhtiari worked significantly on his strength and continued to fight for his job at left tackle, prompting the Packers to move Bryan Bulaga to right tackle and have Bakhtiari at left. Later in the current Packers season, he was placed on the injury report for the game against the Miami Dolphins due to a back injury. He played in all 16 games of his sophomore season as well as the 2 playoff games.

On September 13, 2016, the Green Bay Packers signed Bakhtiari to a four-year, $48 million contract extension that includes $16.7 million guaranteed and a $15 million signing bonus.

On November 15, 2020, the Packers signed Bakhtiari to a four-year, $105.5 million contract extension that would make him the highest-paid offensive lineman in NFL history. On December 21, he was selected for the 2021 Pro Bowl. On December 31, Bakhtiari tore his ACL in practice and was ruled out for the remainder of the season. He was placed on injured reserve two days later. On January 8, 2021, Bakhtiari made the 2020 All-Pro Team first-team.

Bakhtiari was placed on the reserve/physically unable to perform list to start the 2021 season, which meant he would miss at least the first six games. He was activated on November 10, 2021, ahead of the Packers' Week 10 game against the Seattle Seahawks. However, he was declared inactive for nearly every game of the remainder of the regular season. On January 9, 2022, ahead of the season finale against the Detroit Lions, the Packers declared Bakhtiari active for the first time since Week 16 of the previous season. Bakhtiari played 20 snaps in the first half before third-string left tackle Yosh Nijman relieved him for the remainder of the game. The Packers had a bye for the first-round of the playoffs with their conference-best 13–4 record, and played against the San Francisco 49ers in the Divisional Round. On the morning of the game, the Packers declared Bakhtiari inactive for the game, with starting right tackle Billy Turner replacing Bakhtiari at the left tackle spot after returning from injury.

On December 2, 2022, the Packers announced Bakhtiari had to have an emergency appendectomy and would be forced to miss the team's Week 13 game against the Chicago Bears.

Bakhtiari was placed on injured reserve on September 28, 2023, with a knee injury. In October 2023, it was announced that he would miss the remainder of the 2023 season due to a surgery on his knee.

On March 11, 2024, Bakhtiari was released by the Packers after 11 seasons.

== Personal life ==
Bakhtiari resides in Burlingame, California. While in high school, he created the Fund a Dream Scholarship, and also signed autographs at the Jerry Parins Cruise for Cancer in exchange for donations benefiting cancer research. He also visited homeless shelters and nursing homes while attending the University of Colorado. On July 2, 2020, Bakhtiari proposed to his girlfriend Frankie Shebby who he has been dating since October 2017. The couple married on March 5, 2022. Their first child, a daughter, was born December 7, 2022. Their second child, a son, was born on January 8, 2025.

Bakhtiari introduced the Packers to the board game Settlers of Catan which soon became a team favorite. He was also responsible for a group of Packers players appearing in Pitch Perfect 2, when he reached out to director Elizabeth Banks on Twitter.
