= Lattice Engines =

Lattice Engines, Inc.
- Type: Private
- Industry: Internet Marketing
- Founded: June 2006
- Fate: Acquired by Dun & Bradstreet
- Successor: Dun & Bradstreet
- Headquarters: San Mateo, CA
- Key people: Shashi Upadhyay, CEO and cofounder
- Products: Predictive Lead Scoring, salesPRISM, playmaker, marketing and sales applications
- Website: www.lattice-engines.com

Lattice Engines was a technology provider that delivered predictive marketing and sales cloud applications to business-to-business (B2B) companies. The company was privately held and backed by NEA and Sequoia Capital. It was headquartered in San Mateo, CA and has offices in Austin, Boston, New York and Beijing.

== History ==
The company was founded by Shashi Upadhyay, Kent McCormick and Andrew Schwartz in 2006. As of 2013, Upadhyay served as the company's CEO, McCormick served as the president and Schwartz served as the chief architect.

In 2013, it expanded its suite of predictive applications to marketing with Lattice Predictive Lead Scoring.

In 2019, Lattice Engines was acquired by Dun & Bradstreet.

== Software ==
Lattice offers a suite of predictive, cloud applications for marketing and sales that are powered by the Lattice Data Cloud. The applications analyze data and deliver real-time reports with specific data to its users.

Lattice's aim is to offer a big data analytics platform which provides users with intelligent sales targeting, combining internal and external date with proprietary data the company has collected; talking points; and highly specific sales campaigns known as plays, according to ZDNet's Paul Greenberg.

Lattice has more than 65,000 active sales and marketing professionals using its product from companies including Dell, HP and Microsoft. In April 2013, Lattice was named a "Cool Vendor" by Gartner, in its report on CRM and sales technology.
