= Notre Dame High School (Belmont, California) =

Catholic school for women in California, US

Notre Dame High School Belmont

Location
- 1540 Ralston Avenue; Belmont, (San Mateo County), California 94002; United States; 37.5153°N 122.286°W

Information
- Type: Private, All-Female
- Motto: Ora et labora (Pray and work)
- Religious affiliations: Roman Catholic; Sisters of Notre Dame de Namur
- Established: 1851; 175 years ago
- Sister school: Mercy High School, Burlingame, and Junipero Serra High School, San Mateo
- CEEB code: 050275
- Grades: 9-12
- Average class size: 28
- Student to teacher ratio: 14:1
- Campus: Suburban
- Campus size: 10.6 acres (4.3 ha)
- Colors: Blue, White and Gold
- Athletics conference: West Bay Athletic League
- Mascot: Tiger
- Team name: Tigers
- Accreditation: Western Association of Schools and Colleges
- Newspaper: The Catalyst
- Yearbook: The Torch
- Tuition: $26,425 (as of 2020-2021)
- Feeder schools: Notre Dame Elementary School (Belmont, California)
- Website: Official website

Notre Dame High School, Belmont is a Catholic women's college preparatory high school located in the San Mateo County suburb of Belmont, California.

The school is operated by the Sisters of Notre Dame de Namur for the Archdiocese of San Francisco. The school's mission is driven by the teachings of Saint Julie Billiart, the foundress of the Sisters of Notre Dame de Namur. The official school colors are navy, blue, and gold.

== History ==
The School was founded in 1851 originally in San Jose, California. In 1923 they moved to the current Belmont campus on the land of William Ralston's estate, Ralston Hall. The current building was completed in 1928. The school was also originally a boarding school and had facilities to support boarders and day students.

== Programs ==
=== Leadership opportunities ===
According to their website, Notre Dame offers approximately 213 leadership positions. Positions include Ambassadors, Spiritual Life, California Scholarship Federation, National Honor Society, Technology Liaisons, Marketing & Communications, Link Crew, Health & Wellness. There are also opportunities for students as club leaders.

=== School mascot ===
Two students share the position of "NDB Tiger." They make appearances at school, athletic, and community events. The official school colors are navy, blue, and gold. Each class also chooses a class mascot during their freshman year.

=== Clubs ===
There are over 35 clubs at Notre Dame. A member of the faculty or staff moderates each club.

=== Performing arts ===
In July 2008, a combined choir represented Notre Dame at World Youth Day 2008 in Sydney, Australia. The choir sang for over 300,000 people prior to a mass presided by Pope Benedict XVI. In addition, the Notre Dame choir program has received special recognition including many first-place trophies at various competitions, and a proclamation made by the Belmont City Council in late 2008. However, Notre Dame's choir program was discontinued after the 2020–2021 school year.

Notre Dame is also part of Tri-School Productions, a three-school theatre company with Serra High School and Mercy High School Burlingame. They perform a play in the fall and a musical in the spring. There is a Tri-School Mixed Chorus that performs at the school concerts for all three schools, plus a special performance at Hillsdale Mall.

=== Academic Teams ===
Currently Notre Dame has two academic teams, Mock Trial and a FIRST Tech Challenge robotics team called the TigerBots.

=== Athletics ===
According to the NDB website, there are 14 sports programs that include 26 teams over the fall, winter and spring seasons.

== Notable alumni ==
- Angela Batinovich, American businesswoman and entrepreneur
- Olivia de Havilland, actress
- Abigail Kinoiki Kekaulike Kawānanakoa, Hawaiian princess
- Yasmine Pahlavi, wife of Reza Pahlavi, Crown Prince of Iran
- Faith Rivera, singer
- Emma Chamberlain, American YouTuber and podcaster

== See also ==
- San Mateo County high schools
- Archdiocese of San Francisco
