= Chris Munk =

American basketball player (born 1967)

Personal information
- Born: August 5, 1967 (age 58) San Francisco, California, U.S.
- Listed height: 6 ft 9 in (2.06 m)
- Listed weight: 225 lb (102 kg)

Career information
- High school: Archbishop Riordan (San Francisco, California)
- College: USC (1986–1990)
- NBA draft: 1990: undrafted
- Position: Power forward
- Number: 44

Career history
- 1990: Utah Jazz
- 1990–1991: Wichita Falls Texans
- 1991: Rockford Lightning
- 1991: Rapid City Thrillers
- 1992–1993: Oklahoma City Cavalry
- 1995: Brisbane Bullets
- Stats at NBA.com
- Stats at Basketball Reference

Christian Munk (born August 5, 1967) is an American former professional basketball player. He was a 6-foot-9-inch (206 cm) 225 pounds (102 kg) power forward. He attended and played for Archbishop Riordan High School in San Francisco and played collegiately at the University of Southern California (USC). Born in San Francisco, California, he played for the Utah Jazz in the National Basketball Association (NBA).

Munk also played 22 games for the Brisbane Bullets of the Australian National Basketball League (NBL) in 1995.
