= Aerospike (company) =

Technology company based in Mountain View, California, US

- Type: Private
- Industry: NoSQL
- Founded: Mountain View California 2009
- Founder: Brian Bulkowski, Srini Srinivasan
- Headquarters: Mountain View, U.S.
- Key people: John Dillon (CEO), Srini Srinivasan, Jim LoDestro, Lenley Hensarling
- Products: Aerospike (database)
- Number of employees: 101-200 (2020)
- Website: aerospike.com

Aerospike is the company behind the Aerospike NoSQL distributed database management system. Citrusleaf, a Mountain View, California based company which rebranded to Aerospike in August 2012, announced the product in 2011. The software is used by developers to deploy real-time big data applications.

== History ==
Citrusleaf was founded in 2009 by Gian-Paolo Musumeci, CTO Brian Bulkowski, and vice president of engineering and operations Srini V. Srinivasan. The company rebranded to Aerospike in 2012. The database was initially used mainly in the advertising industry as a server-side cookie store, where read and write performance is paramount. It formed the core user data storage for adMarketplace and several other advertising companies including BlueKai, Tapad, The Trade Desk, Sony's So-net, and eXelate. Other customers include payment systems, gaming, cyber-security, and e-commerce industries. In 2012, the web site Wikibon promoted Aerospike for transactional analytic applications. It had automatic fail-over, replication, and cross data center synchronization.

In August 2012, Aerospike acquired the database AlchemyDB. AlchemyDB, led by Russell Sullivan, is a hybrid RDBMS/NoSQL-datastore that has been optimized for memory efficiency. Aerospike made the acquisition with funding from New Enterprise Associates, Draper Associates, Columbus Nova Technology Partners, and Alsop Louie Partners.

In December 2012, online ad broker Tapad bought an Aerospike flash-based NoSQL database running on SSDs with indices held in RAM. The Aerospike database allowed Tapad the cost benefit of dealing with memory as a "single level store" by utilizing flash as a memory extension.

In June 2014, Aerospike raised $20 million in a Series C round of funding. The company announced it had open sourced its technology. The company also partnered with Adform, InMobi, and Vizury in 2014.

In February 2015, Aerospike named John Dillon, previously of Salesforce.com, as its CEO.

Previous logo

A round of $32 million of funding was announced on November 18, 2019, led by Triangle Peak Partners.

== Aerospike database ==
The Aerospike database management system is a key-value datastore, or distributed hash table, that delivers predictable, sub-millisecond query response times. It also has the ability to scale to very large sizes while maintaining high speeds. Its code is engineered to match the characteristics of flash memory, as opposed to more traditional methods.

Aerospike uses row-based random access with indexes in memory and data in memory or on SSD (solid-state drive) storage. The database holds data that is accessible in real time.
