= Joe Kmak =

American baseball player (born 1963)

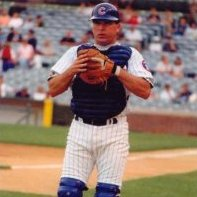
- Kmak catching for the Chicago Cubs at Wrigley Field in 1995
- Catcher
- Born: May 3, 1963 (age 63); Napa, California, U.S.
- Batted: Right Threw: Right

MLB debut
- April 6, 1993, for the Milwaukee Brewers

Last MLB appearance
- August 27, 1995, for the Chicago Cubs

MLB statistics
- Batting average: .227
- Hits: 37
- Home runs: 1
- Runs batted in: 13
- Stolen bases: 6
- Stats at Baseball Reference

Teams
- Milwaukee Brewers (1993); Chicago Cubs (1995)

Joseph Robert Kmak (born May 3, 1963) is an American former professional baseball player who played catcher in Major League Baseball from 1993 to 1995. He played for the Milwaukee Brewers and Chicago Cubs. He stands 6 feet 0 inches (1.83 m) tall and weighs 200 pounds (91 kg). He bats and throws right-handed.

== Early life ==
Joseph Robert Kmak was born on May 3, 1963, in Napa, California. He attended Junípero Serra High School in San Mateo, California, where he excelled in football, basketball, and baseball. As a sophomore on the junior varsity team, Kmak led the league in scoring and was the WCAL scoring champion in 1979. Kmak grew up and played baseball with Barry Bonds, where they won the 1980 West Catholic Athletic League Championship. In his junior season, Kmak won the league batting championship after leading the league in batting average and was a First Team All-WCAL selection in 1980. In his senior year, Kmak was a Second Team All-WCAL selection and was named the recipient of the Blanket Award as the varsity MVP in 1981. Kmak won back-to-back First Team All-San Mateo County honors in 1980 and 1981. He graduated in 1981 and was inducted into the school's Athletic Hall of Fame in 2002.

== College career ==
Kmak attended the University of California, Santa Barbara and played college baseball for the UC Santa Barbara Gauchos baseball team.

== Professional career ==
=== Draft and minor leagues ===
On June 3, 1985, Kmak was drafted by the San Francisco Giants in the tenth round of the 1985 amateur draft, and he signed on June 6, 1985. In 1985, Kmak played for the A-Everett Giants of the Northwest League.

In 1986, Kmak played for the Class A Fresno Giants of the California League. In 1987, Kmak played for the AA Shreveport Captains of the Texas League and Class A Fresno. In 1988, Kmak played for Shreveport. In 1989, Kmak played for the Class A Reno Silver Sox of the California League.

On January 20, 1990, Kmak signed as a free agent with the Milwaukee Brewers. In 1990, Kmak played for two different teams in two different leagues and at two different levels. He played for the AAA Denver Zephyrs of the American Association and the AA El Paso Diablos of the Texas League.

In 1991 and 1992, he played for Denver. In 1993, he started with the AA New Orleans Zephyrs of the American Association.

=== Milwaukee Brewers (1993) ===
On April 6, 1993, at Anaheim Stadium, Kmak made his Major League debut against the California Angels. In the bottom of the third inning, in his first Major League career plate appearance and at bat, Kmak hit a line drive single on the first Major League pitch he saw to center field off of that season's 1993 AL All-Star starting pitcher Mark Langston for his first career Major League hit, moving shortstop Dickie Thon to second base. After Thon was picked off at second by the shortstop Gary Disarcina, Kmak stole second base for his first career Major League stolen base. Leading off the top of the ninth inning against Langston, Kmak drew his first career Major League base on balls. On April 9 at Oakland-Alameda County Coliseum, in a 6–5 win over the Oakland Athletics, Kmak knocked in his first career Major League run batted in and registered his first career multi-hit game in the Majors. In the top of the second inning, Kmak hit a line drive RBI single off of pitcher Bobby Witt into right field, scoring first baseman John Jaha, moving Thon to third base, and making the score 2–0. In the top of the seventh inning, Kmak hit a ground ball single off Witt into left field. On April 12 at Milwaukee County Stadium, Kmak scored his first career Major League run against the California Angels. In the bottom of the sixth inning, National Baseball Hall of Fame shortstop and centerfielder Robin Yount hit a ball off of pitcher Julio Valera that was grounded to the third baseman Rene Gonzales, forcing the out to second baseman Damion Easley which got left fielder Darryl Hamilton out as Kmak scored. This made the score 5–6. On April 21 at the Hubert H. Humphrey Metrodome, in a 10–8 win over the Minnesota Twins in 10 innings, Kmak hit his first career Major League double. In the top of the tenth inning, Kmak hit an RBI double ground ball off of pitcher Mike Hartley into left field that scored Jaha, who had stolen third during Kmak's at-bat, making the score 10–7.

On May 19 at County Stadium, Kmak drew two bases on balls against the Detroit Tigers, his first career Major League game drawing multiple bases on balls. Leading off the bottom of the third inning, Kmak drew a four-pitch walk against pitcher John Doherty. Leading off the bottom of the fifth inning, Kmak drew another walk against Doherty.

Despite only playing 51 games (and starting 37 of them), Kmak's 6 stolen bases tied him with Joe Girardi for 5th among all catchers in 1993.

=== New York Mets ===
In 1994, Kmak played for the AAA Norfolk Tides of the International League.

=== Chicago Cubs (1995) ===
On December 24, 1994, Kmak signed as a free agent with the Chicago Cubs.

Kmak started the 1995 season with the AAA Iowa Cubs of the American Association.

On July 26 at Wrigley Field, against the Montreal Expos, Kmak registered a career-high three base hits in a single Major League Baseball game, all on the first pitch for one pitch at-bats. In the bottom of the second inning, Kmak hit a line drive RBI double on the first pitch he saw to deep left-centerfield off of pitcher Butch Henry that knocked in second baseman José Hernández, making the score 1–0. In the bottom of the fourth inning, Kmak hit a ground ball single on the first pitch he saw to short and second off of Henry, moving left fielder Luis Gonzalez to third. In the bottom of the sixth inning, Kmak hit a pop fly single on the first pitch he saw to the short right field line off of Henry. On July 29 at Wrigley Field, in an 8–7 win over the Philadelphia Phillies, Kmak hit a solo home run to deep left field off of 1995 NL All-Star pitcher Tyler Green in the bottom of the sixth inning, making the score 5–2.

On August 12 at Candlestick Park, in a 4–0 win over the San Francisco Giants, Kmak hit his first career Major League sacrifice fly. On a six-pitch 3-2 count, Kmak hit a flyable off of pitcher Chris Hook to centerfield, which was caught by the centerfielder Rikkert Faneyte, with Gonzalez tagging up from third and scoring in the top of the ninth inning, making the score 4–0.

=== Cincinnati Reds ===
In 1996, Kmak played for the AA Indianapolis Indians of the American Association.

=== Florida Marlins ===
In 1997, Kmak played for the AAA Charlotte Knights of the International League.

=== Cincinnati Reds ===
In 1997, Kmak played for Indianapolis.

=== Kansas City Royals ===
In 1998, Kmak played for the AAA Omaha Royals of the Pacific Coast League.

== Coaching career ==
Kmak began his coaching career as an assistant baseball coach at his alma mater, Junípero Serra High School, and at St. Francis High School in Mountain View, California. As an assistant coach on the varsity team, Kmak was a seven-time WCAL champion as an assistant coach in 2001, 2003, 2004, 2006, 2007, 2008, and 2009, meaning every one of his student–athletes got to win at least one WCAL championship each. Kmak helped coach the Padres to the CIF-CCS championship in 2009, helping send fellow Serra Hall of Famer and varsity baseball head coach Pete Jensen out on top.

== Post-playing career ==
Following his professional career, Kmak worked as a loan consultant at Bayporte Financial from March 1998 to January 2011. He is currently a mathematics teacher at his alma mater, Junípero Serra High School, where he has worked since August 1999.
