= Tapad =

American mobile marketing company

- Company type: Private
- Industry: Technology
- Founded: 2010; 16 years ago
- Founder: Are Traasdahl, Founder; Dag Liodden, Co-Founder & CTO
- Headquarters: New York, NY
- Key people: Sigvart Voss Eriksen, CEO
- Revenue: $34 million (2015)
- Number of employees: 135
- Website: www.tapad.com

Tapad Inc. is a venture-funded startup company based in New York City that develops and markets software and services for cross-device advertising and content delivery. It uses algorithms to analyze internet and device data and predict whether two or more devices are owned by the same person. Participating websites and apps then cater their advertisements based on a collective knowledge of the user's actions across all of their devices.

Tapad was founded in 2010 by Are Traasdahl. It raised $1.8 million in funding in June 2011 and another $6.5 million in March 2013.

On January 29, 2016, Telenor Group entered into an agreement to acquire approximately 95% of Tapad Inc. The purchase price is US$360 million, on a debt and cash-free 100% basis. In November 2020, Tapad was acquired by Experian.

== History ==
The idea for Tapad was conceived by cofounder and CEO Are Traasdahl at the Consumer Electronics Show (CES). Traasdahl previously founded Thumbplay, a mobile entertainment company. He saw attendees switching between televisions, laptops and smartphones and thought that brands should be able to cater their ads to individual users even as they switch between devices.

Cofounder and CTO Dag Liodden, Traasdahl, and four others began developing algorithms for the software and founded Tapad in 2010. It took almost a year for the company to obtain its first client, but afterwards the organization grew quickly. In 2011, it raised $1.8 million in funding and opened five more sales offices in major US cities. From mid-2012 to mid-2013, the company hired 44 people and moved its headquarters to a larger office in New York City.

Another $6.5 million in funding was raised in March 2013 and $7 million was raised in July 2014 to fund additional expansion in Europe. An additional $18.5 million in funding was raised in July 2015.

In 2016, Tapad worked with 160 U.S. brands and had 50 data technology licensing partnerships.

On January 29, 2016, Norway-based Telenor Group entered into an agreement to acquire about 95 percent of Tapad Inc. for $360 million.

On November 19, 2020, Experian announced that it had completed the acquisition of Tapad for a roughly $280 million.

== Software and services ==
Tapad uses data such as cookie IDs, operating system IDs, IP addresses, online registrations and data from partnering publishers to develop a probability that different devices are shared by the same person or household. According to Tapad, none of the data contains personally identifiable information (PII). In a data sample tested by Nielsen, Tapad accurately identified users across devices in 91.2% of cases. This is only slightly less than deterministic methods which require PII.

Tapad is used for advertising to consumers across devices, where a user is shown an ad on their mobile or tablet device based on websites they visited on a desktop or based on a usage behavior that matches an advertiser's target audience. For example, if an Android phone visits a website shortly after a desktop PC from the same home network, Tapad will assess that there is a high probability that the two devices are operated by the same person and will show them similar ads on both devices. According to the company website, its services also include cross-device analytics for things like location, timing, user behavior, and audience analysis.

Website publishers use Tapad's technology to understand how a consumer engages with page content, regardless of the device being used to access the site. This can be useful to customize advertising creative, editorial content and offer a more uniform experience for the user across all devices.

In early 2015, Tapad partnered with Placed, a company that specializes in the measurement of in-store visitation by consumers, then introduced features and services that attempt to measure if an advertising campaign resulted in consumers visiting a business location. It also introduced TV Pulse, a product that uses data from first party data suppliers to attempt to measure the effect of digital advertising campaigns. Tapad's Device Graph is also licensed to other technology companies and integrated into their products.

== Privacy ==
Advertisements using Tapad usually feature a notification that explains the ad is being shown as a result of behavioral analysis and provide an opt-out button in compliance with standards set by the Digital Advertising Alliance. The disclosure features are provided by Evidon, which Tapad partnered with in November 2011. According to Forbes, Tapad's "burgeoning success risks irking Congress, regulators and privacy advocates." The company's CEO says it shouldn't be a problem, since it doesn't collect personally identifiable information.

In 2018, Tapad and other companies were named in a series of privacy complaints for alleged GDPR violations. The complaints were filed in the United Kingdom by watchdog group Privacy International.
