= Archbishop Mitty High School =

Private school in San Jose, California, United States

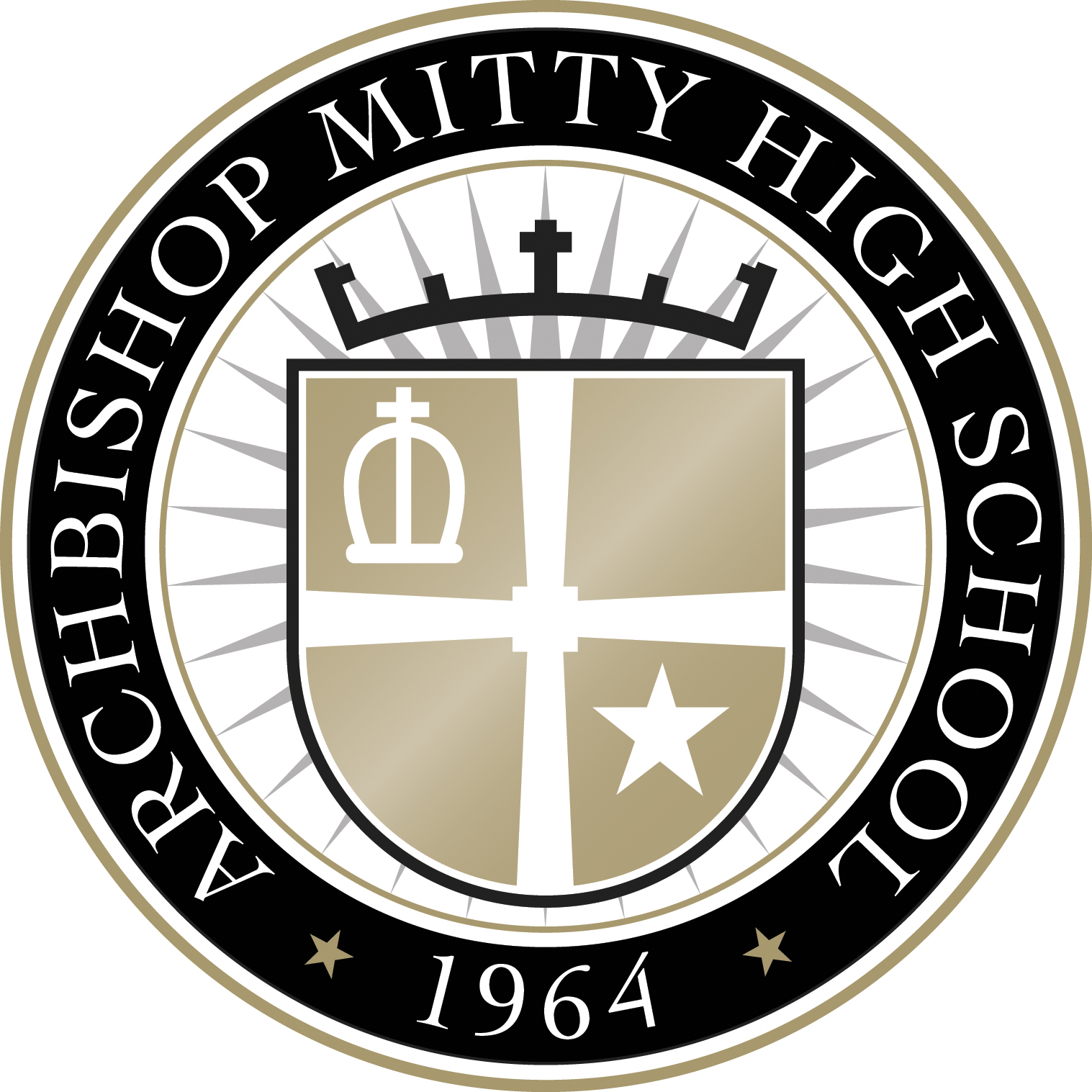

Location
- 5000 Mitty Avenue; San Jose, (Santa Clara County), California 95129; United States; 37°18′56″N 121°59′36″W

Information
- Type: Private
- Motto: Made in the Image and Likeness of God
- Religious affiliation: Roman Catholic
- Established: 1964
- Founder: Joseph T. McGucken
- Oversight: Diocese of San Jose
- CEEB code: 053078
- President: Latanya Hilton
- Teaching staff: 107.8(on an FTE basis)
- Grades: 9–12
- Enrollment: 1768 (2019–20)
- Student to teacher ratio: 16.4
- Campus: Suburban
- Campus size: 24 acres (9.7 ha)
- Colors: Black and gold
- Athletics conference: West Catholic Athletic League
- Nickname: Monarchs
- Accreditation: Western Association of Schools and Colleges
- Newspaper: The Monarch
- Yearbook: Excalibur
- Website: mitty.com
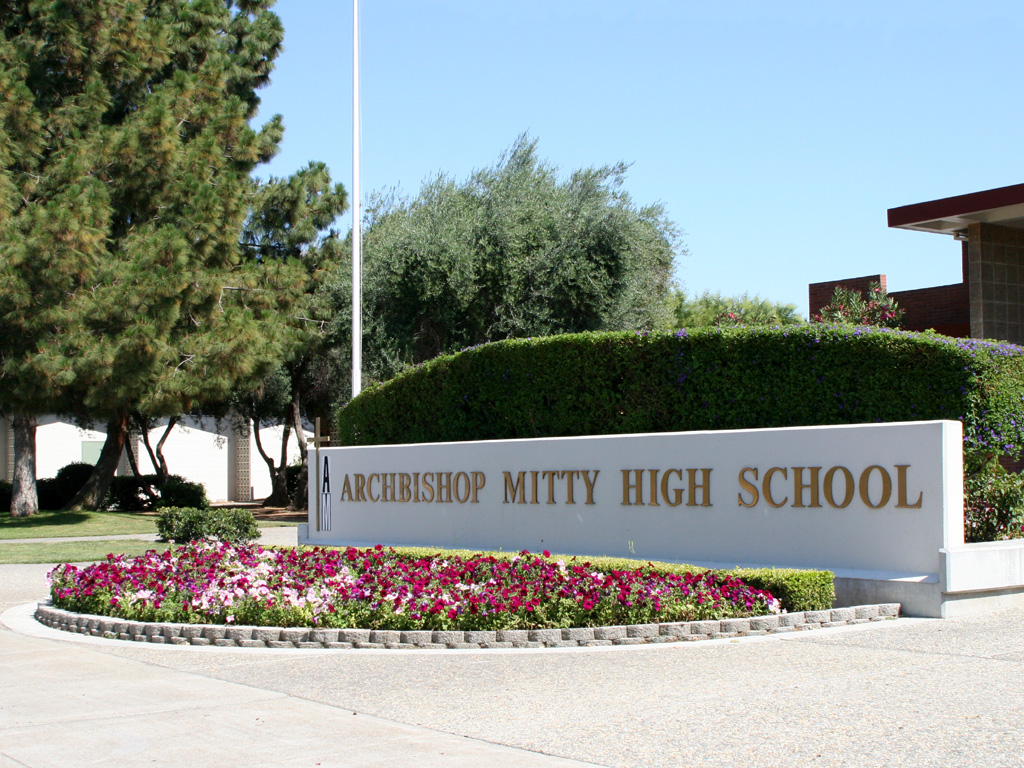
- Front of Archbishop Mitty High School

Archbishop Mitty High School affectionately known as Mitty by its staff, students and alumni is a private Catholic high school located in San Jose, California, United States. The school is named for John Joseph Mitty, the fourth Archbishop of San Francisco. It is one of many Catholic high schools in the Santa Clara Valley. It is the only Diocesan high school in Santa Clara. Construction of the school began in 1963, and when completed, the campus occupied its present 24 acres (9.7 ha).

== History ==
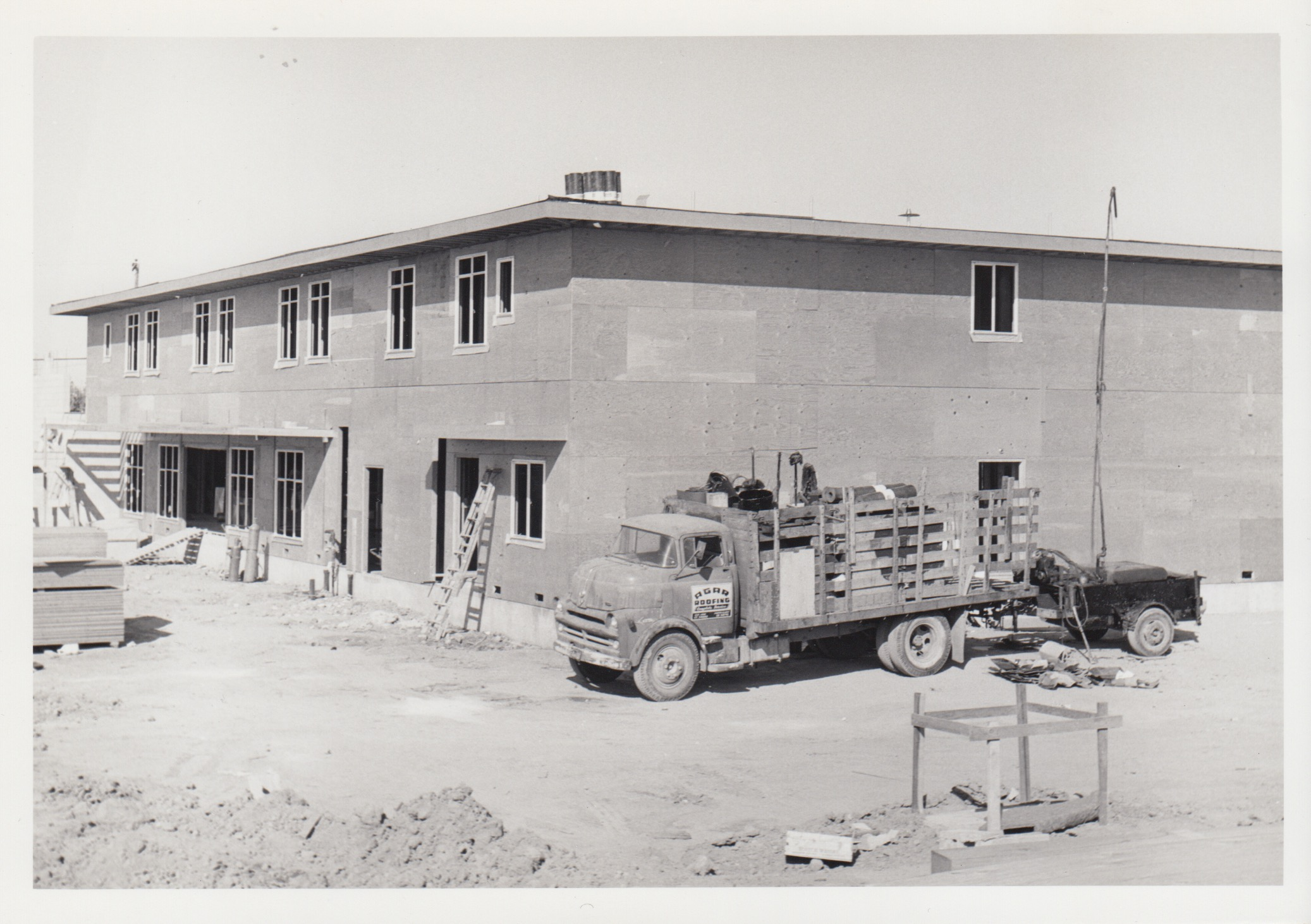
Construction of campus began in the 1960s.

Initially, the school was administered by brothers and priests of the Society of Mary (Marianists). Archbishop Mitty High School opened in the fall of 1964 with an inaugural enrollment of 189 male students, with classes initially held on the campus of the adjacent Queen of Apostles Elementary School. The newly constructed high school facilities were occupied in April 1965.

In 1969, Archbishop Mitty expanded its student body and began sharing academic programs with Mother Butler Memorial High School—located on the site of the present-day Harker School upper school campus—and St. Lawrence Girls High School. The consolidation of the three schools was completed by the fall of 1972. Following the establishment of the Roman Catholic Diocese of San Jose in 1981, Archbishop Mitty became the only high school owned and administered by the diocese.

== Academics ==
As a Catholic college preparatory school, Archbishop Mitty requires coursework in English, mathematics, social studies, science, one of four modern languages (Spanish, French, American Sign Language, and Mandarin Chinese), fine arts, physical education, and religious studies. Archbishop Mitty also provides an honors and Advanced Placement program, offering students over 34 AP courses and honors courses.

== Athletics ==
The Archbishop Mitty Monarchs field 67 teams in 25 sports, most of them in the West Catholic Athletic League of the CIF Central Coast Section. Sports include football, badminton, basketball, baseball, cross country, field hockey, golf, soccer, softball, swimming, diving, tennis, track and field, volleyball, water polo, wrestling, and lacrosse. The Monarchs have a total of 10 national championships as of September 2024. In 2020, the school was named the Cal-Hi Sports School of the Century. In 2009, the school's girls athletic program was ranked first in the state and third in the nation by Sports Illustrated after Mitty won state championships in softball, women's volleyball, women's swimming, and women's tennis.

== Notable alumni ==
- Clint Allard, collegiate basketball coach
- Aaron Bates, professional baseball player and coach
- Kris Bubic, professional baseball player, 40th overall pick in the 2018 MLB draft
- Morgan Cheli, basketball player
- Chris Codiroli, MLB player
- Polina Edmunds, silver medalist at 2014 and 2016 U.S. Figure Skating Championships
- Aaron Gordon, NBA power forward
- Drew Gordon, professional basketball player
- Mitch Haniger, professional baseball player
- Myha'la Herrold, Broadway and TV show actress
- Trevor Hildenberger, professional baseball player
- Haley Jones, basketball player
- Robert King, writer, producer, The Good Wife
- Danielle Robinson, WNBA point guard
- Raymond Townsend, NBA player
- Mike Vail, MLB outfielder
- Kerri Walsh Jennings, winner of three consecutive Olympic beach volleyball gold medals
- Nick Yorke, baseball player, first-round pick in the 2020 MLB draft
- Isabella Esler, Broadway actress
